= I Dream'd I Lay =

1776 song by Robert Burns

I Dream'd I Lay is a song composed by the Scottish poet and lyricist Robert Burns in 1776 when he was seventeen years old. It was one of his earliest poems which was initially published in the second volume of James Johnson's The Scots Musical Museum in 1788.

== History ==
William Scott Douglas claims that the poem reflects a fairly gloomy period in Burns's life when the young poet helped his family keep up an unprofitable farm. It can be consequently read as an autobiographical piece the sunny early morning represents the relatively carefree childhood in Alloway, the stormy period "lang or noon" the sad and gloomy time spent at the secluded farm at Mount Oliphant where the poem was most probably written. The spirit of the poem is not unusual for Burns in his more sombre moments. If anything, the poem is decidedly more optimistic than the conclusion of the almost a decade later and much better known "To a Mouse." The range of experience referred to is nothing unusual for a teenage farmhand, even if the skill (after all, Burns employs here the device of a dream vision and alternates masculine and feminine rhymes) with which this particular teenage farmhand communicates the experience is rather impressive. There is, in short, nothing in the poem that may strike a reader and suggest it was not conceived and written by Burns.

== Lyrics ==
I dream'd I lay where flowers were springing

Gaily in the sunny beam;

List'ning to the wild birds singing,

By a falling, chrystal stream:

Streight the sky grew black and daring;

Thro' the woods the whirlwinds rave;

Trees with aged arms were warring,

O'er the swelling, drumlie wave.

Such was my life's deceitful morning,

Such the pleasures I enjoyed;

But lang or noon, loud tempests storming,

A' my flowery bliss destroy'd.

Tho' fickle Fortune has deceiv'd me,

She promis'd fair, and perform'd but ill;

Of mony a joy and hope bereav'd me,

I bear a heart shall support me still.
