= The World of Robert Burns =

Educational software application

- Developer: Cambridgeshire Software House
- Initial release: 1995
- Operating system: RISC OS Microsoft Windows 3.1
- Platform: Acorn Archimedes PC
- License: Proprietary commercial software

The World of Robert Burns is educational software which teaches about the life and times of Robert Burns. It was launched to coincide with the 200th anniversary of Burns's death. The software was awarded Gold by Acorn User magazine.

It was developed by Cambridge Software House in associate with Galloway Education Authority, and featured poems, letters, music, photographs and videos.
