= Robert Burns =

Scottish poet and lyricist (1759–1796)

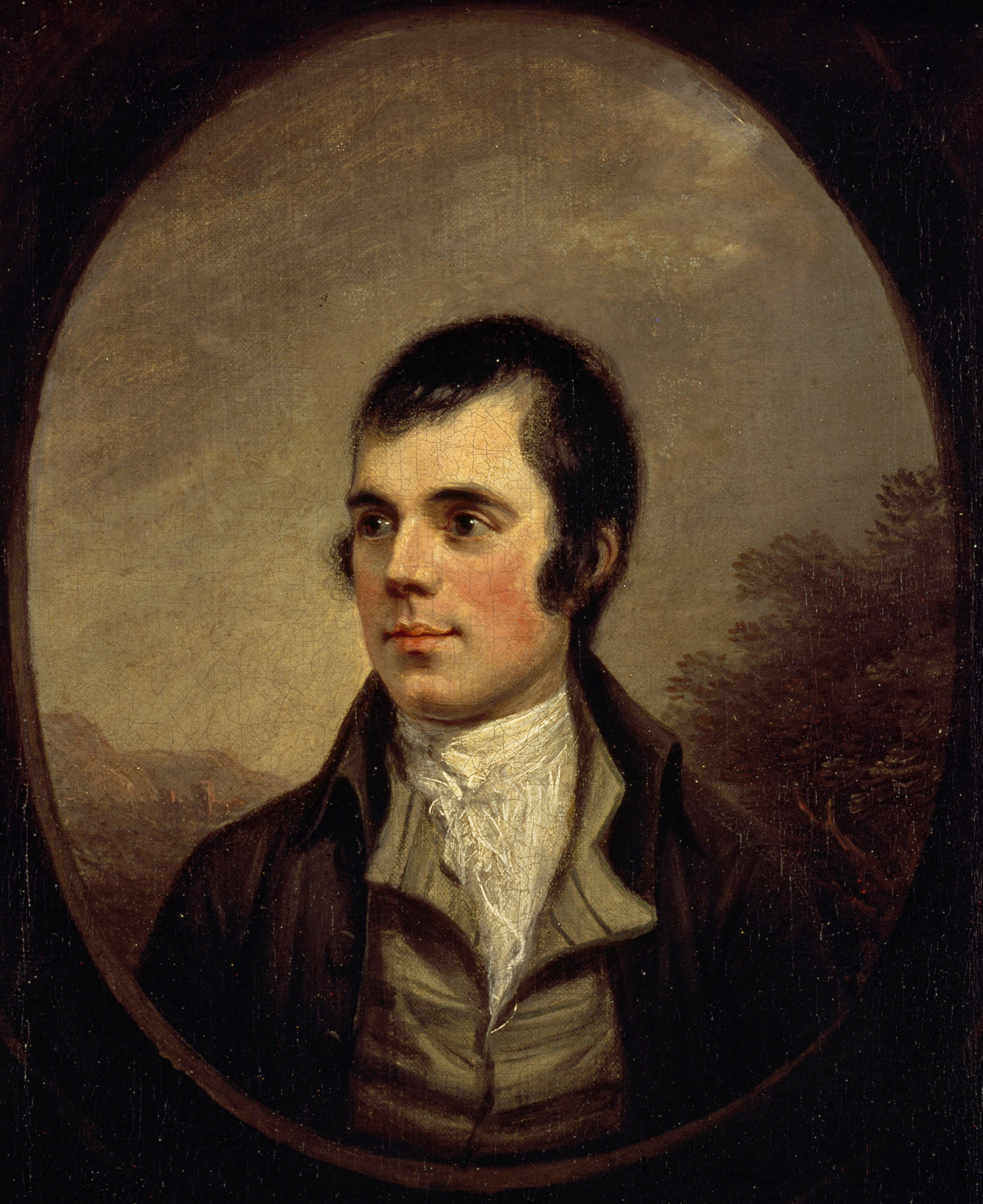
- Portrait by Alexander Nasmyth, 1787
- Born: 25 January 1759; Alloway, Ayrshire, Scotland
- Died: 21 July 1796 (aged 37); Dumfries, Scotland
- Resting place: Burns Mausoleum, Dumfries
- Other name: Rabbie Burns
- Occupations: Poet; lyricist; farmer; exciseman
- Spouse: Jean Armour
- Children: 12
- Parents: William Burnes; Agnes Broun
- Writing career
- Language: Scots language
- Notable works: "Halloween" (1785); "To a Mouse" (1785); "To a Louse" (1786); "The Battle of Sherramuir" (1787); "Auld Lang Syne" (1788); "Tam O'Shanter" (1790); "Ae Fond Kiss" (1791); "Scots Wha Hae" (1793); "A Red, Red Rose" (1794); "A Man's a Man for A' That" (1795)
- Notable awards
- Military service
- Allegiance: Great Britain
- Branch: British Volunteer Corps
- Service years: 1795–1796
- Rank: Private
- Unit: Royal Dumfries Volunteers
- Conflicts: French Revolutionary Wars
- Movement: Romanticism

Robert Burns (25 January 1759 – 21 July 1796), also known familiarly as Rabbie Burns, (Note: Burns is also known by various other names and epithets. These include the National Bard, Bard of Ayrshire, the Ploughman Poet, Scotland's favourite son, and simply the Bard.) was a Scottish poet and lyricist. He is widely regarded as the national poet of Scotland and is celebrated worldwide. He is the best known of the poets who have written in the Scots language, although much of his writing is in a "light Scots dialect" of English, accessible to an audience beyond Scotland. He also wrote in standard English, and in these writings his political or civil commentary is often at its bluntest.

He is regarded as a pioneer of the Romantic movement, and after his death he became a great source of inspiration to the founders of both liberalism and socialism, and a cultural icon in Scotland and among the Scottish diaspora around the world. Celebration of his life and work became almost a national charismatic cult during the 19th and 20th centuries, and his influence has long been strong on Scottish literature. In 2009 he was chosen as the greatest Scot by the Scottish public in a vote run by Scottish television channel STV.

As well as making original compositions, Burns also collected folk songs from across Scotland, often revising or adapting them. His poem (and song) "Auld Lang Syne" (1788) is often sung at Hogmanay (the last day of the year), and "Scots Wha Hae" (1793) served for a long time as an unofficial national anthem of the country. Other poems and songs of Burns that remain well known across the world today include "Halloween" (1785), "To a Mouse" (1785), "To a Louse" (1786), "The Battle of Sherramuir" (1787), "Tam o' Shanter" (1790), "Ae Fond Kiss" (1791), "A Red, Red Rose" (1794) and "A Man's a Man for A' That" (1795).

== Life and background ==
=== Ayrshire ===
==== Alloway ====
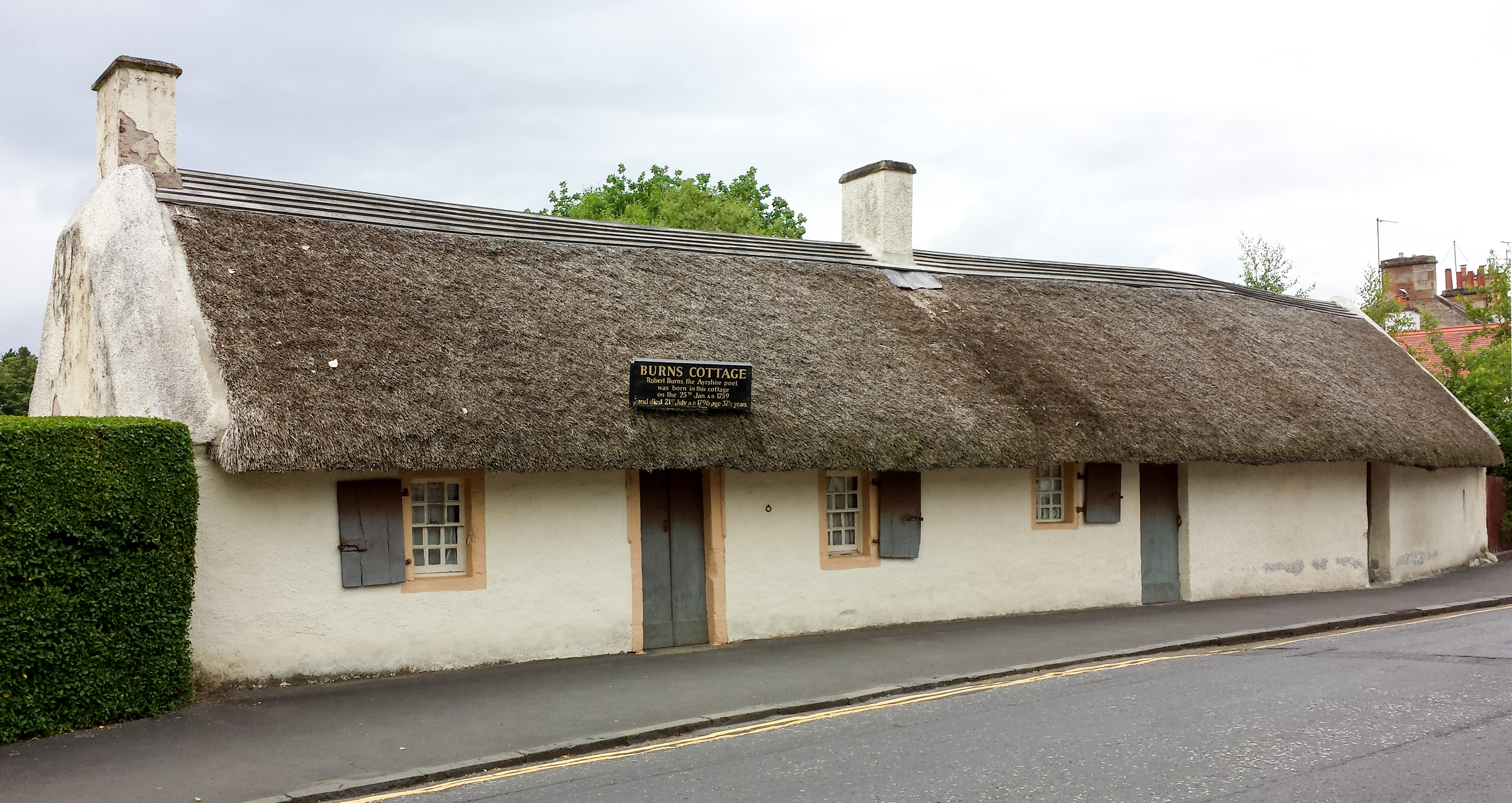
Burns Cottage in Alloway, South Ayrshire

Robert Burns was born on 25 January 1759, two miles (3 km) south of Ayr in Alloway, Ayrshire, on the west coast of Scotland. He was the eldest of seven children of William Burnes, a self-educated tenant farmer from Dunnottar in the Mearns, and Agnes Broun, the daughter of a Kirkoswald tenant farmer.

He was born in a house built by his father (now the Burns Cottage Museum). On January 26, 1759, the day after he was born, Robert Burns was baptised in the Auld Kirk of Ayr by minister William Dalrymple. Burns went on to live in the cottage until Easter 1766, when he was seven years old. William Burnes sold the house and took the tenancy of the 70-acre (280,000 m^{2}) Mount Oliphant farm, southeast of Alloway. Here Burns grew up in poverty and hardship, and the severe manual labour of the farm left its traces in a weakened constitution.

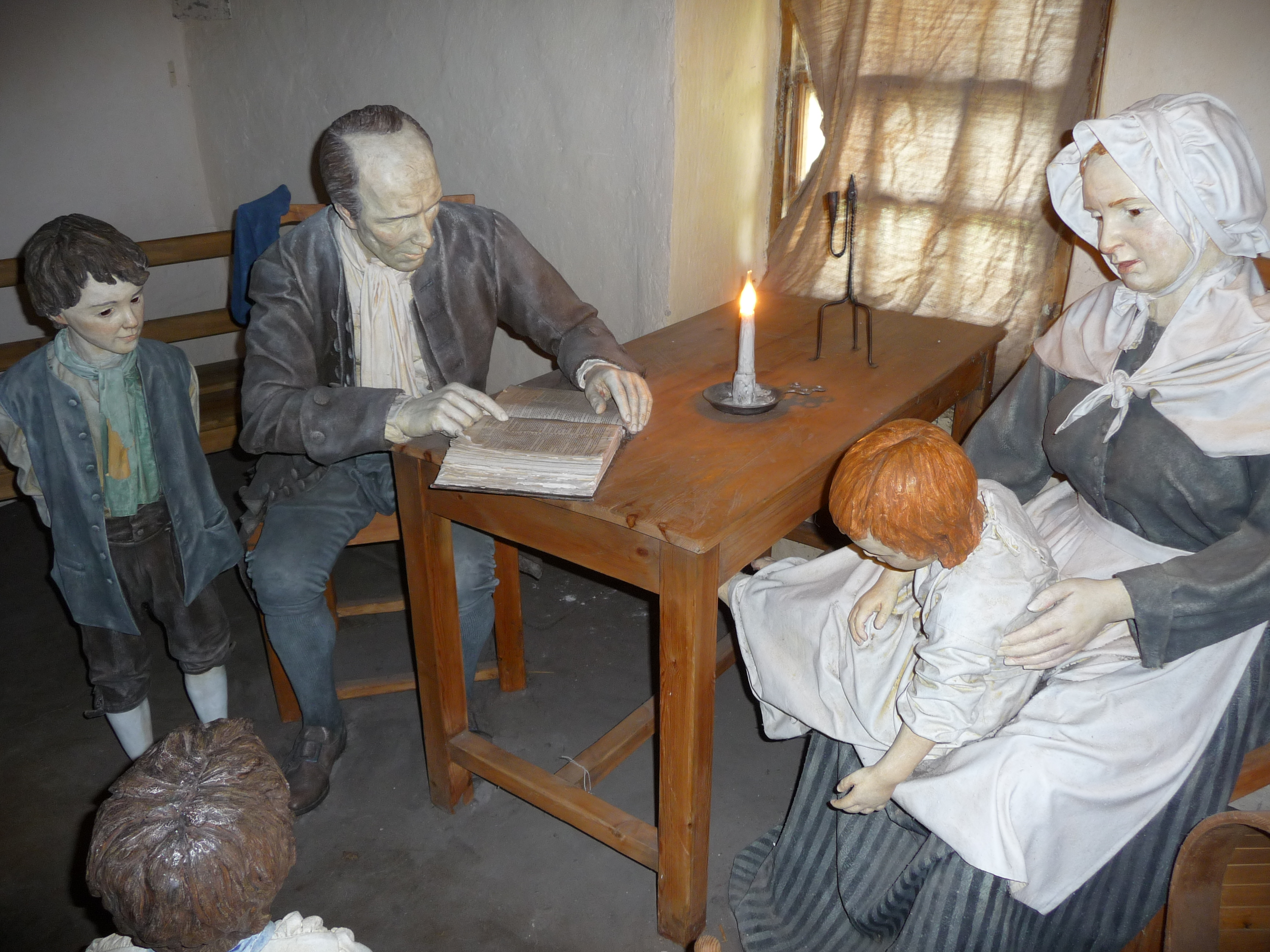
A depiction of the Burns family inside the Burns Cottage

He was given irregular schooling and a lot of his education was with his father, who taught his children reading, writing, arithmetic, geography, and history and also wrote for them A Manual of Christian Belief. He was also taught and tutored by the young teacher John Murdoch, who opened an "adventure school" in Alloway in 1763 and taught Latin, French, and mathematics to both Robert and his brother Gilbert from 1765 to 1768 until Murdoch left the parish. After a few years of home education, Burns was sent to Dalrymple Parish School in mid-1772 before returning at harvest time to full-time farm labouring until 1773, when he was sent to lodge with Murdoch for three weeks to study grammar, French, and Latin.

By the age of 15, Burns was the principal labourer at Mount Oliphant. During the harvest of 1774, he was assisted by Nelly Kilpatrick, who inspired his first attempt at poetry, "O, Once I Lov'd A Bonnie Lass". In 1775, he was sent to finish his education with a tutor at Kirkoswald, where he met Peggy Thompson, to whom he wrote two songs, "Now Westlin' Winds" and "I Dream'd I Lay".

==== Tarbolton ====
Despite his ability and character, William Burnes was consistently unfortunate, and migrated with his large family from farm to farm without ever being able to improve his circumstances. At Whitsun, 1777, he removed his large family from the unfavourable conditions of Mount Oliphant to the 130-acre (0.53 km^{2}) farm at Lochlea, near Tarbolton, where they stayed until William Burnes's death in 1784. Subsequently, the family became integrated into the community of Tarbolton. To his father's disapproval, Robert joined a country dancing school in 1779 and, with Gilbert, formed the Tarbolton Bachelors' Club the following year. His earliest existing letters date from this time, when he began making romantic overtures to Alison Begbie. In spite of four songs written for her and a suggestion that he was willing to marry her, she rejected him.

Robert Burns was initiated into the Masonic lodge St David, Tarbolton, on 4 July 1781, when he was 22. In December 1781, Burns moved temporarily to Irvine to learn to become a flax-dresser, but during the workers' celebrations for New Year 1781/1782 (which included Burns as a participant) the flax shop caught fire and was burnt to the ground. This venture accordingly came to an end, and Burns went home to Lochlea farm. During this time he met and befriended Richard Brown, who encouraged him to become a poet. He continued to write poems and songs and began a commonplace book in 1783, while his father fought a legal dispute with his landlord. The case went to the Court of Session, and Burnes was upheld in January 1784, a fortnight before he died.

==== Mauchline ====
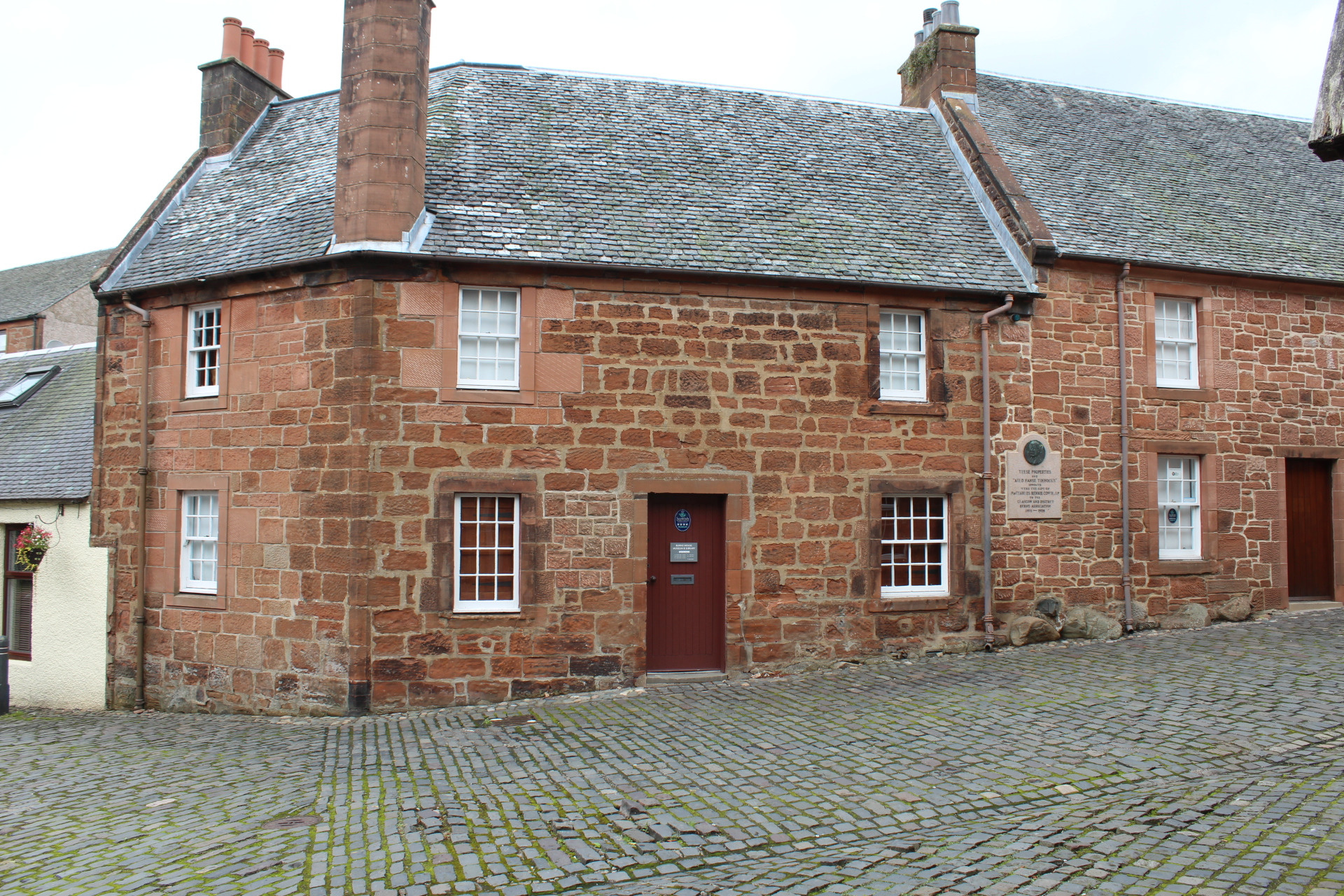
Burns House and Museum in Mauchline, East Ayrshire

Robert and Gilbert made an ineffectual struggle to keep on the farm, but after its failure they moved to Mossgiel Farm, near Mauchline, in March, which they maintained and resided in from 1785. In mid-1784 Burns came to know a group of girls known collectively as The Belles of Mauchline, one of whom was Jean Armour, the daughter of a stonemason from Mauchline.

==== Jamaica overseer job offer ====
Burns had encountered financial difficulties due to his lack of success as a farmer. In order to make enough money to support a family, he accepted a job offer from Patrick Douglas, an absentee plantation owner who lived in Cumnock, to work on his sugar plantations near Port Antonio, Jamaica. Burns himself described the position as being "a poor Negro driver." Douglas' plantations were managed by his brother Charles, and the job offer, which had a salary of £30 per annum, entailed working in Jamaica as a "book-keeper", whose duties included serving as an assistant overseer to the Black slaves on the plantations. The position, which was for a single man, would entail Burns living on a plantation in rustic conditions, as it was unlikely a book keeper would be housed in the plantation's great house. Some historians have argued in Burns's defence that in 1786, the Scottish abolitionist movement was just beginning to be broadly active. Burns's authorship of "The Slave's Lament", a 1792 poem argued as an example of his abolitionist views, is disputed. His name is absent from any abolitionist petition written in Scotland during the period, and according to academic Lisa Williams, Burns "is strangely silent on the question of chattel slavery compared to other contemporary poets. Perhaps this was due to his government position, severe limitations on free speech at the time or his association with beneficiaries of the slave trade system".

==== Love affairs ====
Burns's first child, Elizabeth "Bess" Burns, was born to his mother's servant, Elizabeth Paton, while he was embarking on a relationship with Jean Armour, who became pregnant with twins in March 1786. It is likely that Burns gave Jean a courting ring in 1786. Burns signed a paper attesting his marriage to Jean, but her father "was in the greatest distress, and fainted away". To avoid disgrace, her parents sent her to live with her uncle in Paisley. Although Armour's father initially forbade it, they were married in 1788. They had nine children together, three of whom survived infancy.

Around the same time, Burns fell in love with a woman named Mary Campbell, whom he had seen in church while he was still living in Tarbolton. She was born near Dunoon and had lived in Campbeltown before moving to work in Ayrshire. He dedicated the poems "The Highland Lassie O", "Highland Mary", and "To Mary in Heaven" to her. His song "Will ye go to the Indies, my Mary, And leave auld Scotia's shore?" suggests that they planned to emigrate to Jamaica together. Their relationship has been the subject of much conjecture, and it has been suggested that on 14 May 1786 they exchanged Bibles and plighted their troth over the Water of Fail in a traditional form of marriage. Soon afterwards Mary Campbell left her work in Ayrshire, went to the seaport of Greenock, and sailed home to her parents in Campbeltown. In October 1786, Mary and her father sailed from Campbeltown to visit her brother in Greenock. Her brother fell ill with typhus, which she also caught while nursing him. She died of typhus on 20 or 21 October 1786 and was buried there.

==== Kilmarnock volume ====
Title page of the Kilmarnock Edition

As Burns lacked the funds to pay for his passage to Jamaica, Gavin Hamilton suggested that he should "publish his poems in the meantime by subscription, as a likely way of getting a little money to provide him more liberally in necessaries for Jamaica." On 3 April Burns sent proposals for publishing his Scotch Poems to John Wilson, a printer in Kilmarnock, who published these proposals on 14 April 1786, on the same day that Jean Armour's father tore up the paper in which Burns attested his marriage to Jean. To obtain a certificate that he was a free bachelor, Burns agreed on 25 June to stand for rebuke in the Mauchline kirk for three Sundays. He transferred his share in Mossgiel farm to his brother Gilbert on 22 July, and on 30 July wrote to tell his friend John Richmond that, "Armour has got a warrant to throw me in jail until I can find a warrant for an enormous sum ... I am wandering from one friend's house to another."

On 31 July 1786 John Wilson published the volume of works by Robert Burns, Poems, Chiefly in the Scottish dialect. Known as the Kilmarnock volume, it sold for 3 shillings and contained much of his best writing, including "The Twa Dogs" (which features Luath, his Border Collie), "Address to the Deil", "Halloween", "The Cotter's Saturday Night", "To a Mouse", "Epitaph for James Smith", and "To a Mountain Daisy", many of which had been written at Mossgiel farm. The success of the work was immediate, and soon he was known across the country.

Burns postponed his planned emigration to Jamaica on 1 September, and was at Mossgiel two days later when he learnt that Jean Armour had given birth to twins. On 4 September Thomas Blacklock wrote a letter expressing admiration for the poetry in the Kilmarnock volume, and suggesting an enlarged second edition. A copy of it was passed to Burns, who later recalled, "I had taken the last farewell of my few friends, my chest was on the road to Greenock; I had composed the last song I should ever measure in Scotland – 'The Gloomy night is gathering fast' – when a letter from Dr Blacklock to a friend of mine overthrew all my schemes, by opening new prospects to my poetic ambition. The Doctor belonged to a set of critics for whose applause I had not dared to hope. His opinion that I would meet with encouragement in Edinburgh for a second edition, fired me so much, that away I posted for that city, without a single acquaintance, or a single letter of introduction."

=== Edinburgh ===
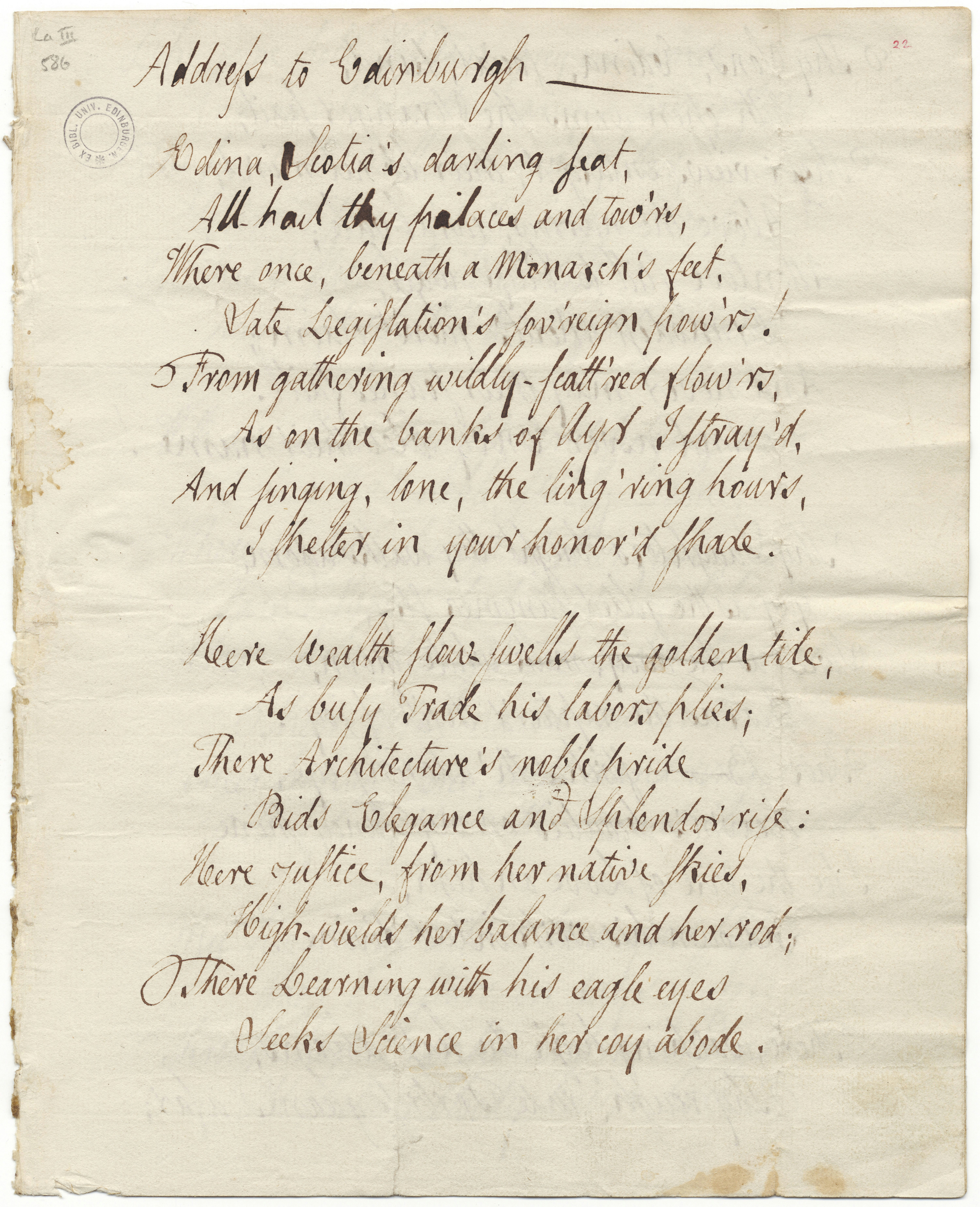
This manuscript copy of 'Address to Edinburgh' written in Burns's hand, was sent in 1787 to Lady Henrietta Don (nee Cunningham), sister to Earl of Glencairn. The manuscript is now part of the Laing Collection at the University of Edinburgh.

On 27 November 1786 Burns borrowed a pony and set out for Edinburgh. On 14 December William Creech issued subscription bills for the first Edinburgh edition of Poems, Chiefly in the Scottish dialect, which was published on 17 April 1787. Within a week of this event, Burns had sold his copyright to Creech for 100 guineas. For the edition, Creech commissioned Alexander Nasmyth to paint the oval bust-length portrait now in the Scottish National Portrait Gallery, which was engraved to provide a frontispiece for the book. Nasmyth had come to know Burns and his fresh and appealing image has become the basis for almost all subsequent representations of the poet. In Edinburgh, he was received as an equal by the city's men of letters—including Dugald Stewart, Robertson, Blair and others—and was a guest at aristocratic gatherings, where he bore himself with unaffected dignity. Here he encountered, and made a lasting impression on, the 16-year-old Walter Scott, who described him later with great admiration:

[His person was strong and robust;] his manners rustic, not clownish, a sort of dignified plainness and simplicity which received part of its effect perhaps from knowledge of his extraordinary talents. His features are presented in Mr Nasmyth's picture but to me it conveys the idea that they are diminished, as if seen in perspective. I think his countenance was more massive than it looks in any of the portraits ... there was a strong expression of shrewdness in all his lineaments; the eye alone, I think, indicated the poetical character and temperament. It was large, and of a dark cast, and literally glowed when he spoke with feeling or interest. [I never saw such another eye in a human head, though I have seen the most distinguished men of my time.]

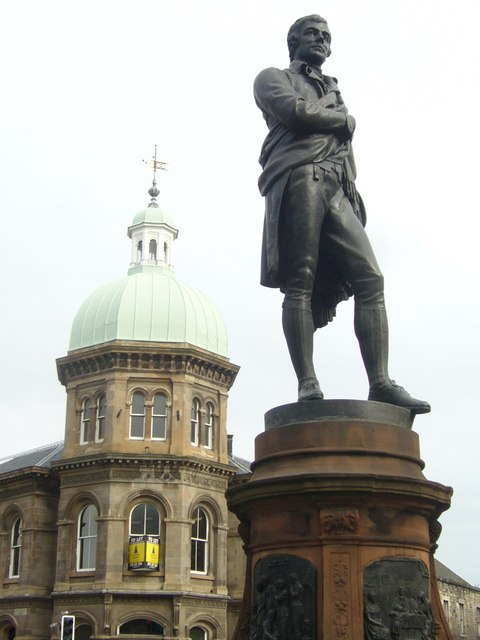
Burns statue by David Watson Stevenson (1898) in Bernard Street, Leith

The new edition of his poems brought Burns £400. His stay in the city also resulted in some lifelong friendships, among which were those with Lord Glencairn, and Frances Anna Dunlop, who became his occasional sponsor and with whom he corresponded for many years until a rift developed. He embarked on a relationship with the separated Agnes "Nancy" McLehose, with whom he exchanged passionate letters under pseudonyms (Burns called himself "Sylvander" and Nancy "Clarinda"). When it became clear that Nancy would not be easily seduced into a physical relationship, Burns moved on to Jenny Clow, Nancy's domestic servant, who bore him a son, Robert Burns Clow, in 1788. He also had an affair with a servant girl, Margaret "May" Cameron. His relationship with Nancy concluded in 1791 with a final meeting in Edinburgh before she sailed to Jamaica for what turned out to be a short-lived reconciliation with her estranged husband. Before she left, he sent her the manuscript of "Ae Fond Kiss" as a farewell.

In Edinburgh, in early 1787, he met James Johnson, a struggling music engraver and music seller with a love of old Scots songs and a determination to preserve them. Burns shared this interest and became an enthusiastic contributor to The Scots Musical Museum. The first volume was published in 1787 and included three songs by Burns. He contributed 40 songs to volume two, and he ended up responsible for about a third of the 600 songs in the whole collection, as well as making a considerable editorial contribution. The final volume was published in 1803.

=== Dumfriesshire ===
==== Ellisland Farm ====
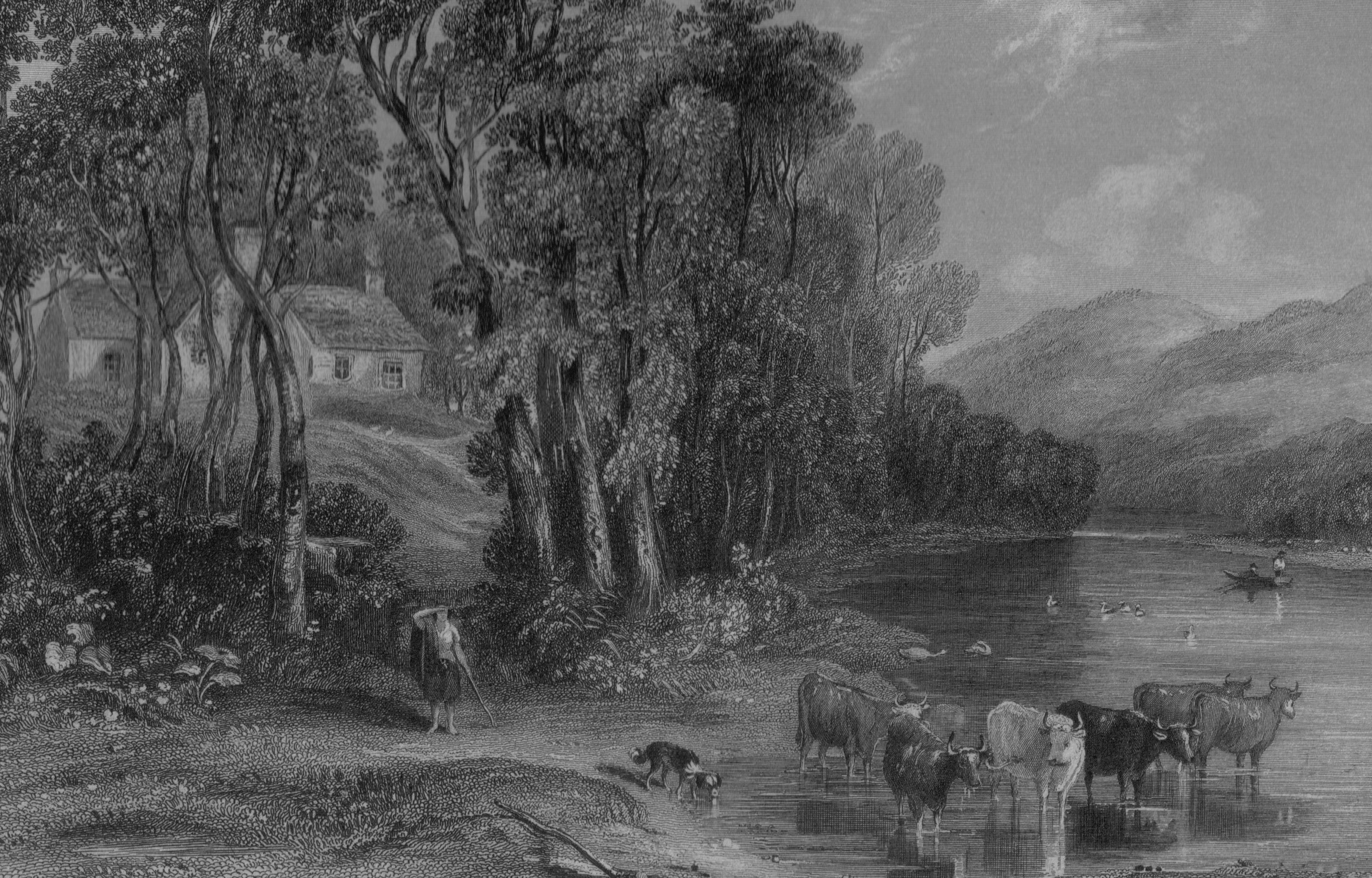
Ellisland Farm in the time of Burns

On his return from Edinburgh in February 1788, he resumed his relationship with Jean Armour and they married in March 1788. He took out a lease on Ellisland Farm, Dumfriesshire, settling there in June. He also took up a training position as an exciseman or gauger, which involved long rides and detailed bookkeeping. He was appointed to duties in Customs and Excise in 1789. Burns chose the land of Ellisland a few miles north of the town of Dumfries, from Patrick Miller's estate at Dalswinton, where he had a new farmhouse and byre built. He and Jean moved in the following summer 1789 to the new farmhouse at Ellisland. In November 1790, he had written his masterpiece, the narrative poem "Tam O' Shanter". (The Ellisland farm, beside the river Nith, now holds a unique collection of Burns's books, artifacts, and manuscripts. It is mostly preserved as when Burns and his young family lived there.) Burns gave up the farm in 1791 to move to Dumfries.

About this time he was offered and declined an appointment in London on the staff of The Star newspaper, and refused to become a candidate for a newly created Chair of Agriculture in the University of Edinburgh, although influential friends offered to support his claims. He did however accept membership of the Royal Company of Archers in 1792.

==== Lyricist ====
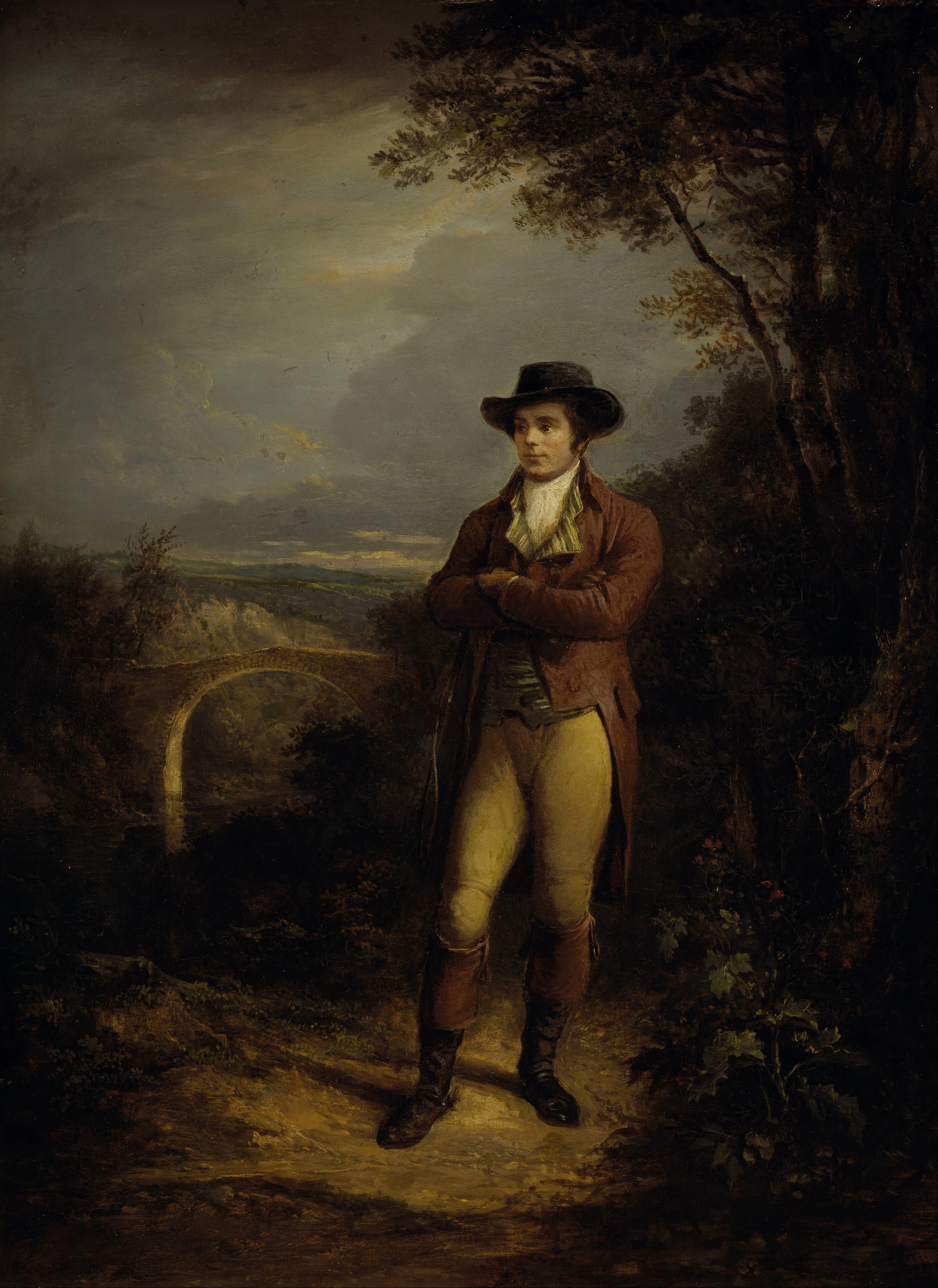
Robert Burns, 1759 - 1796. Poet (1828), by the artist Alexander Nasmyth

After giving up his farm, he removed to Dumfries. It was at this time that, being requested to write lyrics for The Melodies of Scotland, he responded by contributing over 100 songs. He made major contributions to George Thomson's A Select Collection of Original Scottish Airs for the Voice as well as to James Johnson's Scots Musical Museum. Arguably his claim to immortality chiefly rests on these volumes, which placed him in the front rank of lyric poets. As a songwriter he provided his own lyrics, sometimes adapted from traditional words. He put words to Scottish folk melodies and airs which he collected, and composed his own arrangements of the music including modifying tunes or recreating melodies on the basis of fragments. In letters he explained that he preferred simplicity, relating songs to spoken language which should be sung in traditional ways. The original instruments would be fiddle and the guitar of the period which was akin to a cittern, but the transcription of songs for piano has resulted in them usually being performed in classical concert or music hall styles. At the 3 week Celtic Connections festival Glasgow each January, Burns songs are often performed with both fiddle and guitar.

Thomson as a publisher commissioned arrangements of "Scottish, Welsh and Irish Airs" by such eminent composers of the day as Joseph Haydn and Ludwig van Beethoven, with new lyrics. The contributors of lyrics included Burns. While such arrangements had wide popular appeal, Beethoven's music was more advanced and difficult to play than Thomson intended.

Burns described how he had to master singing the tune before he composed the words:

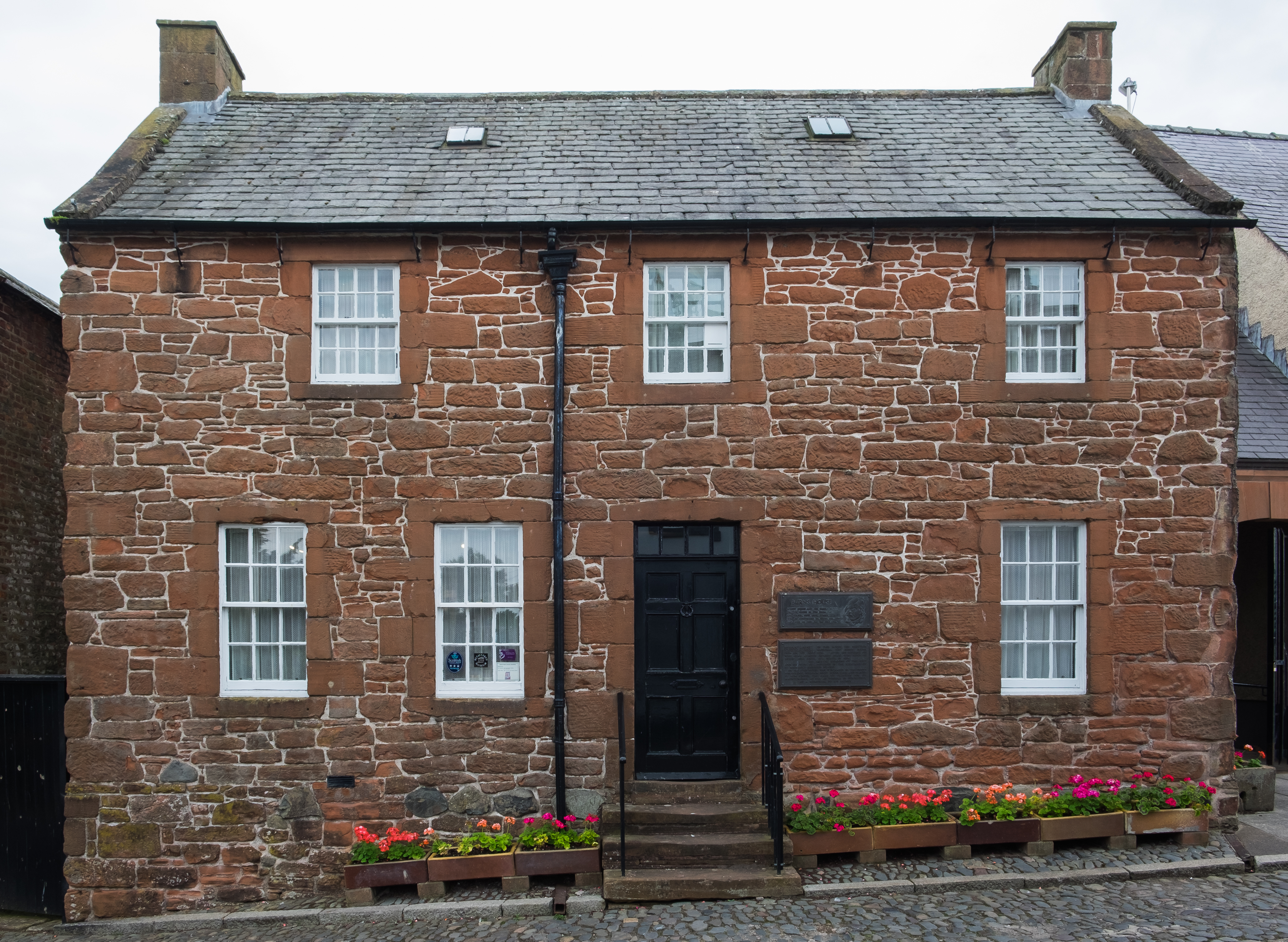
Burns House in Dumfries, Scotland

My way is: I consider the poetic sentiment, correspondent to my idea of the musical expression, then chuse my theme, begin one stanza, when that is composed—which is generally the most difficult part of the business—I walk out, sit down now and then, look out for objects in nature around me that are in unison or harmony with the cogitations of my fancy and workings of my bosom, humming every now and then the air with the verses I have framed. when I feel my Muse beginning to jade, I retire to the solitary fireside of my study, and there commit my effusions to paper, swinging, at intervals, on the hind-legs of my elbow chair, by way of calling forth my own critical strictures, as my, pen goes.

Burns also worked to collect and preserve Scottish folk songs, sometimes revising, expanding, and adapting them. One of the better known of these collections is The Merry Muses of Caledonia (the title is not Burns's), a collection of bawdy lyrics that were popular in the music halls of Scotland as late as the 20th century. At Dumfries, he wrote his world famous song "A Man's a Man for A' That", which was based on the writings in The Rights of Man by Thomas Paine, one of the chief political theoreticians of the American Revolution. Burns sent the poem anonymously in 1795 to the Glasgow Magazine. He was also a radical for reform and wrote poems for democracy, such as – "Parcel of Rogues to the Nation" and the "Rights of Women".

Many of Burns's most famous poems are songs with the music based upon older traditional songs. For example, "Auld Lang Syne" is set to the traditional tune "Can Ye Labour Lea", "A Red, Red Rose" is set to the tune of "Major Graham" and "The Battle of Sherramuir" is set to the "Cameronian Rant".

==== Radicalism and military service ====
Burns alienated some acquaintances by freely expressing sympathy with the American and French Revolutions along with British advocates of democratic reform and universal suffrage such as the Society of the Friends of the People, which advocated parliamentary reform. Burns met other radicals at the Globe Inn in Dumfries. His political views came to the notice of his employers, to which he pleaded his innocence. As the British establishment was hostile to radicalism, Burns felt the need to demonstrate his loyalty to the Crown in order to safeguard his career as an exciseman. To this end on 28 March 1795 he enlisted in the Royal Dumfries Volunteers, a regiment of the British Volunteer Corps, at the rank of private.

Burns joined the regiment's second company, which had been raised on 21 March; all its members provided their own uniforms and agreed to serve without pay, although they were limited to serving in a five mile radius around Dumfries. In April Burns wrote a song titled Does Haughty Gaul Invasion Threat?, which expressed both British nationalist sentiments and Burns' egalitarian views; his military service did not stop him from writing revolutionary poems and letters anonymously. Burns took his military service seriously, consistently attending the unit's training sessions, which were typically around two hours twice a week, and was never fined for absenteeism, drunkenness or insolence unlike many of his fellow soldiers. He also served on the unit's supply committee from August to October 1795.

==== Failing health and death ====
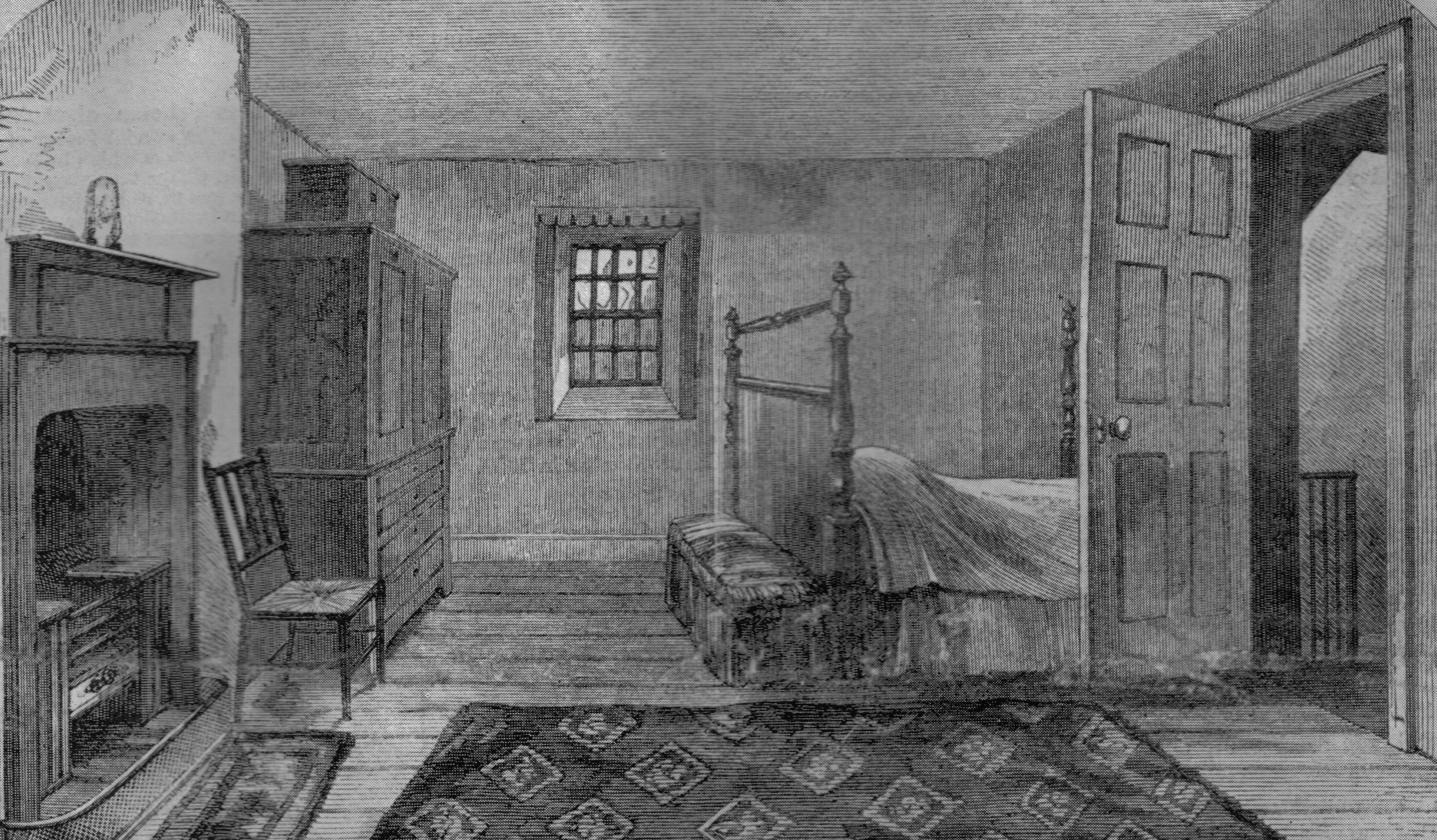
The room Burns died in

Latterly Burns lived in Dumfries in a two-storey red sandstone house on Mill Hole Brae, now Burns Street. The home is now a museum. He went on long journeys on horseback, often in harsh weather conditions as an Excise Supervisor, and was kept very busy doing reports. The father of four young children, he was also frequently occupied as a song collector and songwriter. As his health began to give way, he aged prematurely and fell into fits of despondency. Rumours of intemperance (alleged mainly by temperance activist James Currie) may have been overstated. Hard manual farm labour earlier in his life may have damaged Burns's health. Burns possibly had a long-standing rheumatic heart condition, perhaps beginning when he was 21, and a bacterial infection, possibly arising from a tooth abscess, may have exacerbated this.

On the morning of 21 July 1796, Burns died in Dumfries at the age of 37. The funeral took place on 25 July, the day that his son Maxwell was born. As Burns was a soldier he received a military burial, which included having his Volunteer Corps uniform and sword being placed on his coffin, which was carried by Burns' comrades in the Royal Dumfries Volunteers. The Cinque Ports Light Dragoons and Angusshire Fencibles were also present at the funeral, with the former's military band playing the "Dead March" from George Frideric Handel's Saul. The Royal Dumfries Volunteers fired three volleys over his coffin before it was deposited into a graveyard in the far corner of St. Michael's Churchyard in Dumfries. A simple "slab of freestone" was erected as his gravestone by Jean Armour, which some felt insulting to his memory. His body was eventually moved to its final location in the same cemetery, the Burns Mausoleum, in September 1817. The body of his widow Jean Armour was buried with his in 1834.

==== After Burns' death ====
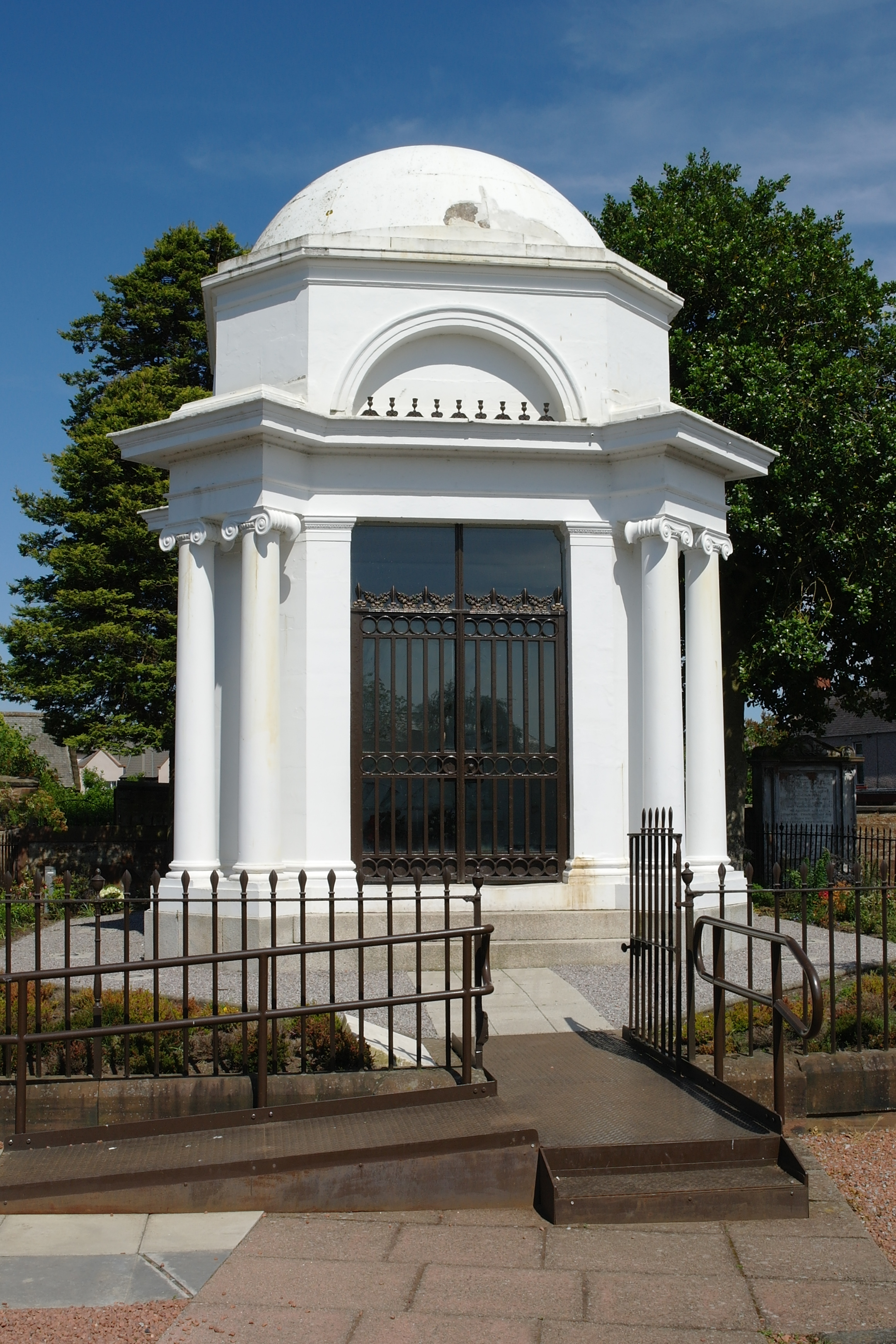
Robert Burns Mausoleum at St Michael's churchyard in Dumfries

Armour had taken steps to secure his personal property, partly by liquidating two promissory notes amounting to £15 (equivalent to £1,667 in 2025). The family went to the Court of Session in 1798 with a plan to support his surviving children by publishing a four-volume edition of his complete works and a biography written by James Currie. Subscriptions were raised to meet the initial cost of publication, which was in the hands of Thomas Cadell and William Davies in London and William Creech, bookseller in Edinburgh. Hogg records that fund-raising for Burns's family was embarrassingly slow, and it took several years to accumulate significant funds through the efforts of John Syme and Alexander Cunningham.

Burns was posthumously given the freedom of the town of Dumfries. Hogg records that Burns was given the freedom of the Burgh of Dumfries on 4 June 1787, 9 years before his death, and was also made an Honorary Burgess of Dumfries.

Through his five surviving children (of 12 born), Burns has over 900 living descendants as of 2019.

==== Removal of Burns' skull ====
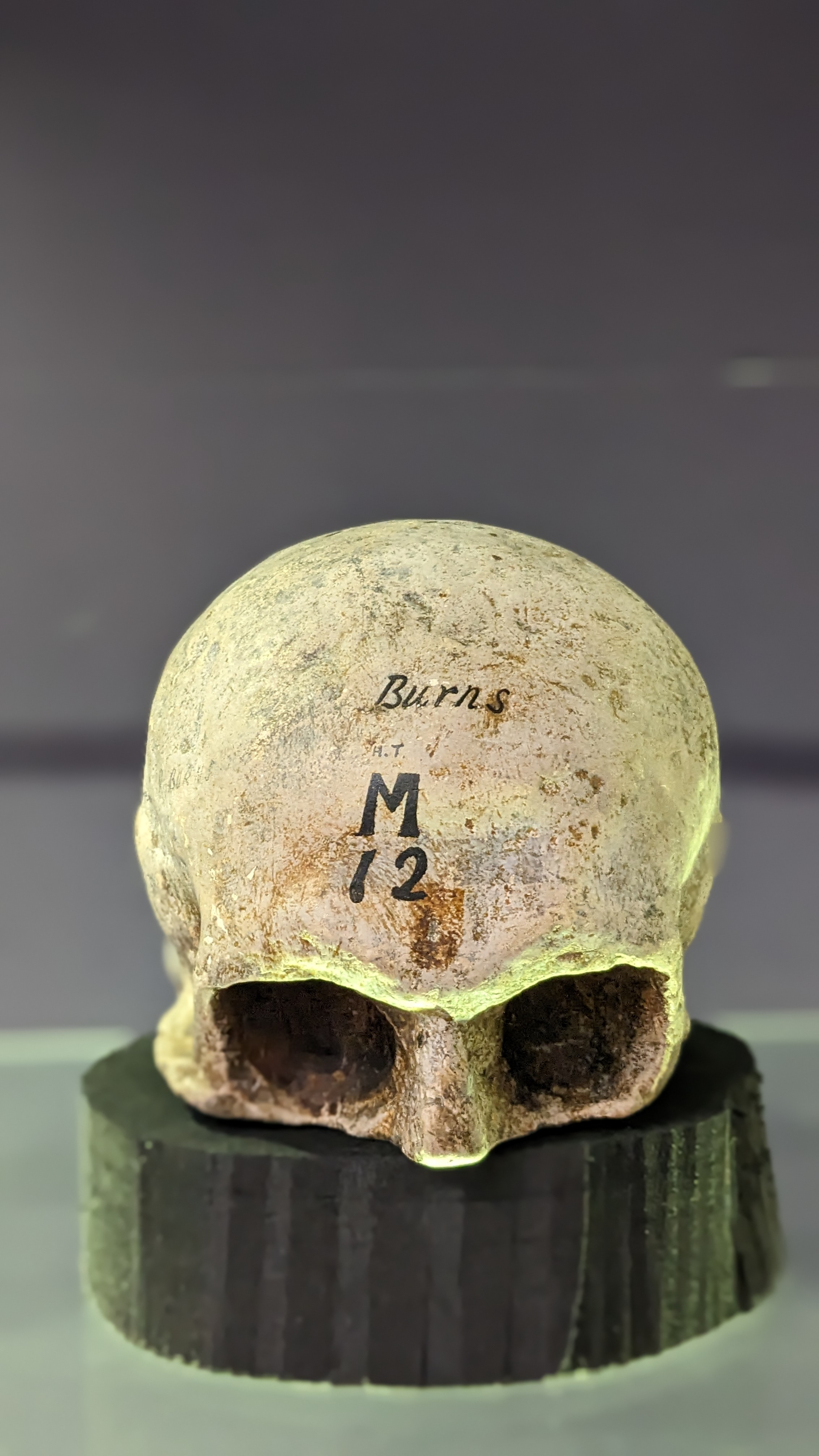
Cast of the skull of Burns after his exhumation in 1834. Held at the Anatomical Museum in Edinburgh, Scotland.

Armour died on 26 March 1834 and was interred into the Burns Mausoleum on 31 March 1834. The temporary reopening of the mausoleum provided an opportunity to exhume Burns' body by a local group who believed in phrenology, a pseudo-science whose practitioners believed an individual's personality could be predicted by measuring the skulls.

The night before Armour's funeral, the group was supposedly granted permission to exhume Burns's body by her brother, Robert Armour. They were led by Archibald Blacklock, a surgeon, and John McDiarmid, Dumfries Courier editor and phrenologist. Other group members included Adam Rankine, James Kerr, James Bogie, Andrew Crombie and their assistants.

The group attempted to enter the mausoleum at 7 pm, but there were many people present in the graveyard and they decided to try again later that evening. The skull was removed and taken to James Fraser, a local plasterer of Queensbury Street, Dumfries. The skull was later returned to the tomb.

A plaster cast was sent to George Combe, a Scottish lawyer and practitioner of phrenology based in Edinburgh. Combe published a report about his findings, entitled 'Phrenological development of Robert Burns. From a cast on his skull moulded at Dumfries, the 31st day of March, 1834'.

==== Number of plaster casts ====
It is unknown how many casts were made by Fraser, with some sources reporting three were made. Six casts are known though some may be copies of the original cast.

- Anatomical Museum, University of Edinburgh
- The Hunterian, University of Glasgow
- Writers' Museum, a museum in Edinburgh
- Dumfries Museum
- East Ayrshire Museums
- National Trust for Scotland's Robert Burns Birthplace Museum

== Literary style ==
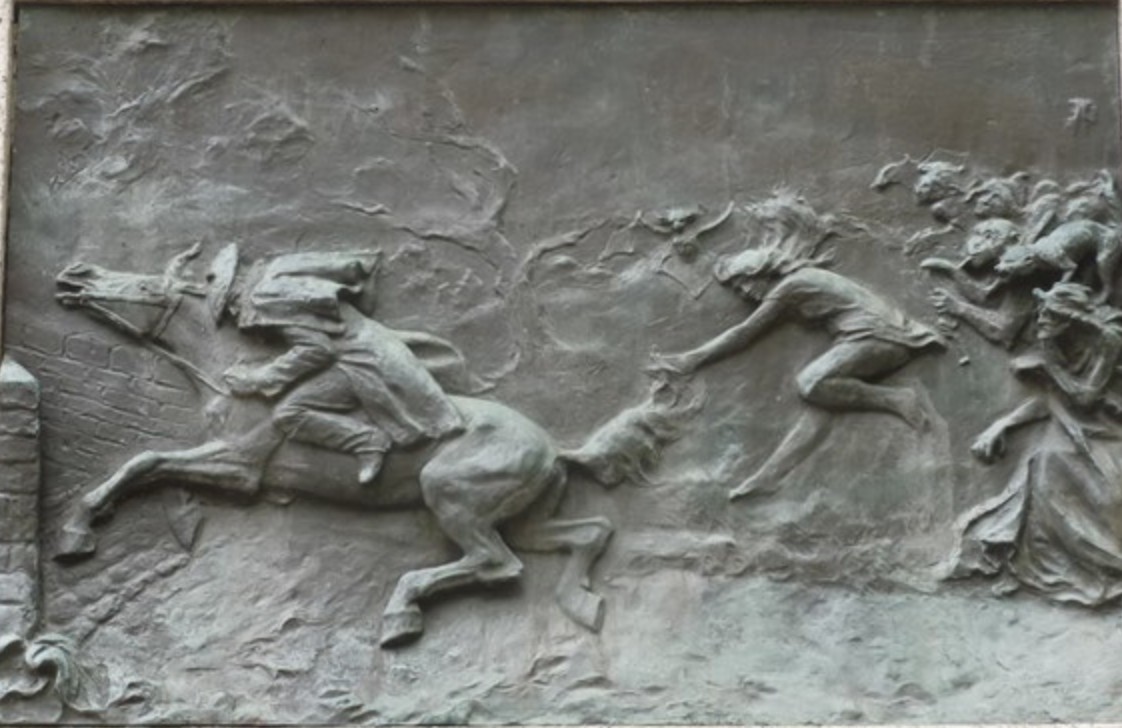
Tam O'Shanter's Ride, Victoria Park, Halifax, Nova Scotia

Burns's style is marked by spontaneity, directness, and sincerity, and ranges from the tender intensity of some of his lyrics through the humour of "Tam o' Shanter" and the satire of "Holy Willie's Prayer" and "The Holy Fair".

Burns's poetry drew upon a substantial familiarity with and knowledge of Classical, Biblical, and English literature, as well as the Scottish Makar tradition. Burns was skilled in writing not only in the Scots language but also in the Scottish English dialect of the English language. Some of his works, such as "Love and Liberty" (also known as "The Jolly Beggars"), are written in both Scots and English for various effects.

His themes included republicanism (he lived during the French Revolutionary period) and Radicalism, which he expressed covertly in "Scots Wha Hae", Scottish patriotism, anticlericalism, class inequalities, gender roles, commentary on the Scottish Kirk of his time, Scottish cultural identity, poverty, sexuality, and the beneficial aspects of popular socialising (carousing, Scotch whisky, folk songs, and so forth).

The strong emotional highs and lows associated with many of Burns's poems have led some, such as Burns biographer Robert Crawford, to suggest that he suffered from manic depression—a hypothesis that has been supported by analysis of various samples of his handwriting. Burns himself referred to suffering from episodes of what he called "blue devilism". The National Trust for Scotland has downplayed the suggestion on the grounds that evidence is insufficient to support the claim.

== Influence ==
=== Britain ===
I mourned with thousands, but as one
More deeply grieved, for He was gone
Whose light I hailed when first it shone,
And showed my youth
How Verse may build a princely throne
On humble truth.

— Extract from Wordsworth's poem in tribute to Burns, "At the Grave of Burns"

Burns is generally classified as a proto-Romantic poet, and he influenced William Wordsworth, Samuel Taylor Coleridge, and Percy Bysshe Shelley greatly. Wordsworth, the first English poet influenced by Burns, read Poems, Chiefly in the Scottish Dialect (1786) at the age of 17, and in 1803 he visited Burns's grave in Dumfries and wrote the poem "At the Grave of Burns", acknowledging that Burns showed "how verse may build a princely throne / On humble truth".

Burns's direct literary influences in the use of Scots in poetry were Allan Ramsay and Robert Fergusson. The Edinburgh literati worked to sentimentalise Burns during his life and after his death, dismissing his education by calling him a "heaven-taught ploughman". Burns influenced later Scottish writers, especially Hugh MacDiarmid, who fought to dismantle what he felt had become a sentimental cult that dominated Scottish literature.

=== Canada ===
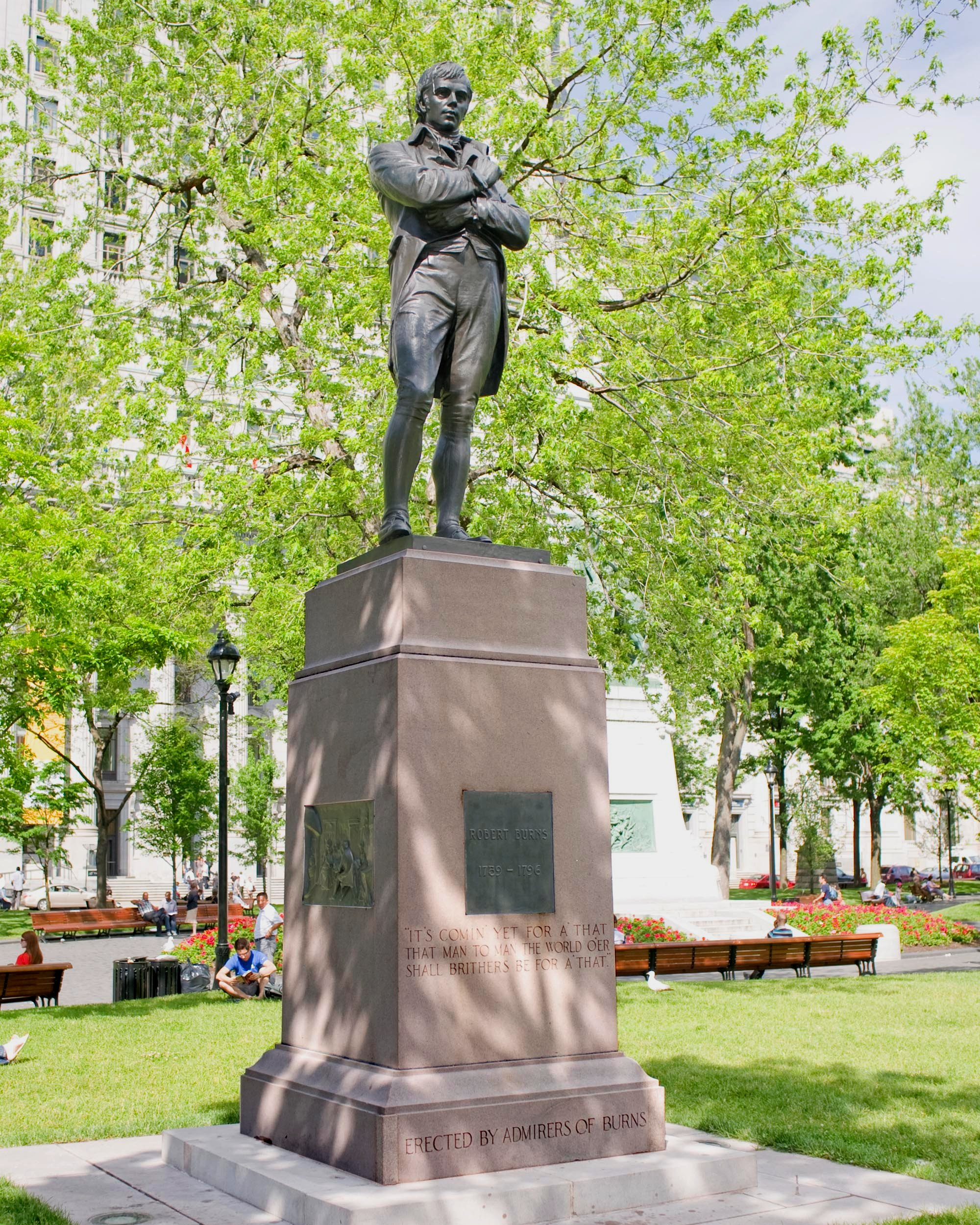
Burns Monument in Dorchester Square, Montréal, Québec

Burns had a significant influence on Alexander McLachlan and some influence on Robert Service. While this may not be so obvious in Service's English verse, which is Kiplingesque, it is more readily apparent in his Scots verse.

Scottish Canadians have embraced Robert Burns as a kind of patron poet and mark his birthday with festivities. 'Robbie Burns Day' is celebrated from Newfoundland and Labrador to Nanaimo. Every year, Canadian newspapers publish biographies of the poet, listings of local events and buffet menus. Universities mark the date in a range of ways: McMaster University library organized a special collection and Simon Fraser University's Centre for Scottish Studies organized a marathon reading of Burns's poetry. Senator Heath Macquarrie quipped of Canada's first Prime Minister that "While the lovable [Robbie] Burns went in for wine, women and song, his fellow Scot, John A. did not chase women and was not musical!" 'Gung Haggis Fat Choy' is a hybrid of Chinese New Year and Robbie Burns Day, celebrated in Vancouver since the late 1990s.

=== United States ===
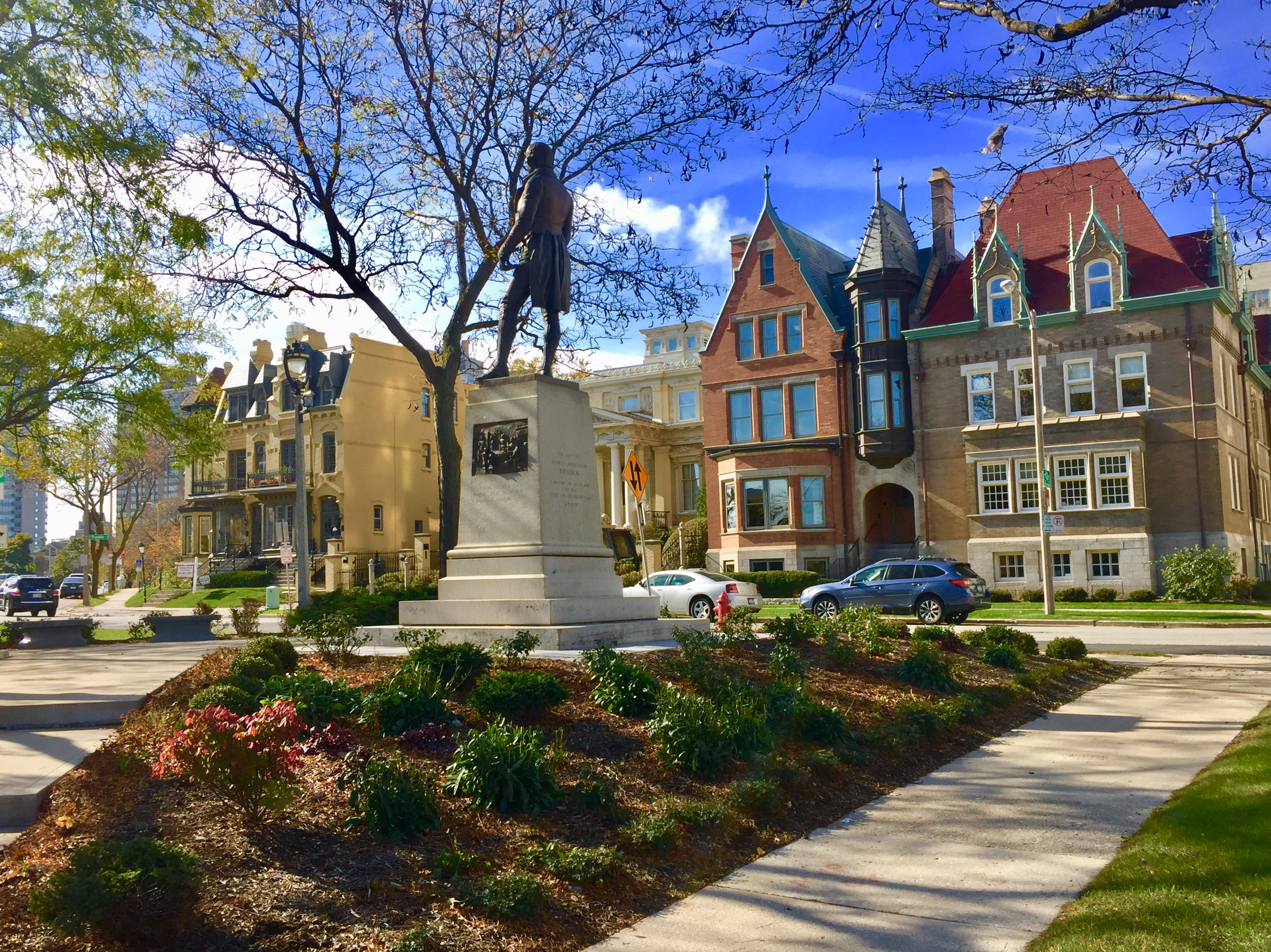
Burns Commons in Milwaukee, Wisconsin, U.S.

In January 1864, President Abraham Lincoln was invited to attend a Robert Burns celebration by Robert Crawford; and if unable to attend, send a toast. Lincoln composed a toast.

An example of Burns's literary influence in the US is seen in the choice by novelist John Steinbeck of the title of his 1937 novel, Of Mice and Men, taken from a line in the second-to-last stanza of "To a Mouse": "The best laid schemes o' mice an' men / Gang aft agley." Burns's influence on American vernacular poets such as James Whitcomb Riley and Frank Lebby Stanton has been acknowledged by their biographers. When asked in 2008 for the source of his greatest creative inspiration, singer-songwriter Bob Dylan selected Burns's 1794 song "A Red, Red Rose" as the lyric that had the biggest effect on his life.

The author J. D. Salinger used protagonist Holden Caulfield's misinterpretation of Burns's poem "Comin' Through the Rye" as his title and a main interpretation of Caulfield's grasping to his childhood in his 1951 novel The Catcher in the Rye. The poem, actually about a rendezvous, is thought by Caulfield to be about saving people from falling out of childhood.

=== Russia ===
Burns became the "people's poet" of Russia. In Imperial Russia Burns was translated into Russian and became a source of inspiration for the ordinary, oppressed Russian people. In Soviet Russia, he was elevated as the archetypal poet of the people. As a great admirer of the egalitarian ethos behind the American and French Revolutions who expressed his own egalitarianism in poems such as his "Birthday Ode for George Washington" or his "Is There for Honest Poverty" (commonly known as "A Man's a Man for a' that"), Burns was well placed for endorsement by the Communist regime as a "progressive" artist. A new translation of Burns begun in 1924 by Samuil Marshak proved enormously popular, selling over 600,000 copies. The USSR honoured Burns with a commemorative stamp in 1956. He remains popular in Russia after the fall of the Soviet Union.

== Honours ==
=== Landmarks and organisations ===
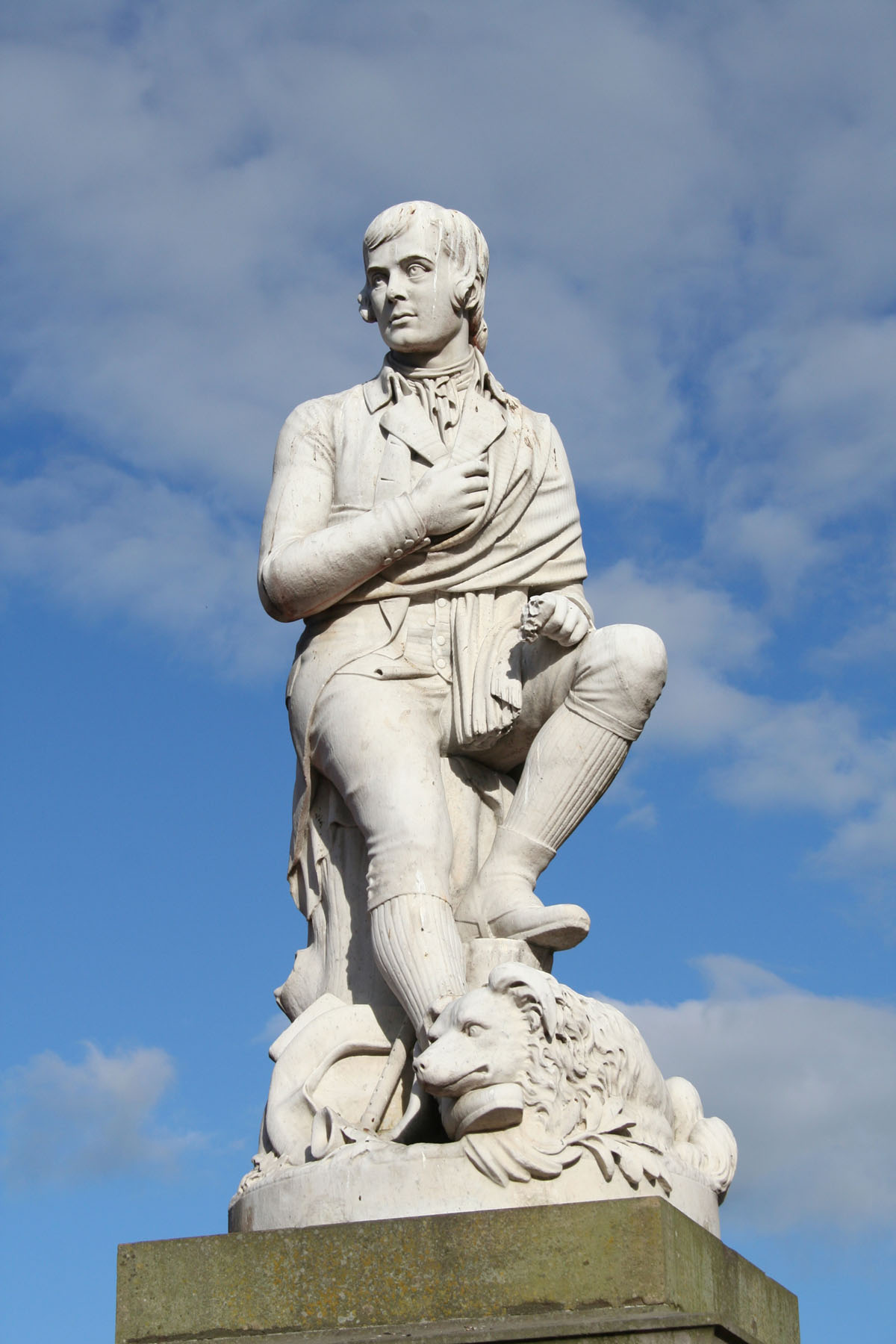
Statue of Burns in Dumfries town centre, unveiled in 1882

Burns clubs have been founded worldwide. The first one, known as The Mother Club, was founded in Greenock in 1801 by merchants born in Ayrshire, some of whom had known Burns. The club set its original objectives as "To cherish the name of Robert Burns; to foster a love of his writings, and generally to encourage an interest in the Scottish language and literature." The club also continues to have local charitable work as a priority.

Burns's birthplace in Alloway is now a National Trust for Scotland property called the Robert Burns Birthplace Museum. It includes: the humble Burns Cottage where he was born and spent the first years of his life, a modern museum building which houses more than 5,000 Burns artefacts including his handwritten manuscripts, the historic Alloway Auld Kirk and Brig o Doon which feature in Burns's masterpiece "Tam o Shanter", and the Burns Monument which was erected in Burns's honour and finished in 1823. His house in Dumfries is operated as the Robert Burns House, and the Robert Burns Centre in Dumfries features more exhibits about his life and works. Ellisland Farm in Auldgirth, which he owned from 1788 to 1791, is maintained as a working farm with a museum and interpretation centre by the Friends of Ellisland Farm.

Significant 19th-century monuments to him stand in Alloway, Leith, and Dumfries. An early-20th-century replica of his birthplace cottage belonging to the Burns Club Atlanta stands in Atlanta, Georgia. These are part of a large list of Burns memorials and statues around the world.

Organisations include the Robert Burns Fellowship of the University of Otago in New Zealand, and the Burns Club Atlanta in the United States. Towns named after Burns include Burns, New York, and Burns, Oregon.

In the suburb of Summerhill, Dumfries, the majority of the streets have names with Burns connotations. A British Rail Standard Class 7 steam locomotive was named after him, along with a later Class 87 electric locomotive, No. 87035. On 24 September 1996, Class 156 diesel unit 156433 was named The Kilmarnock Edition at Girvan station to launch the new Burns Line services between Girvan, Ayr and Kilmarnock, supported by Strathclyde Partnership for Transport.

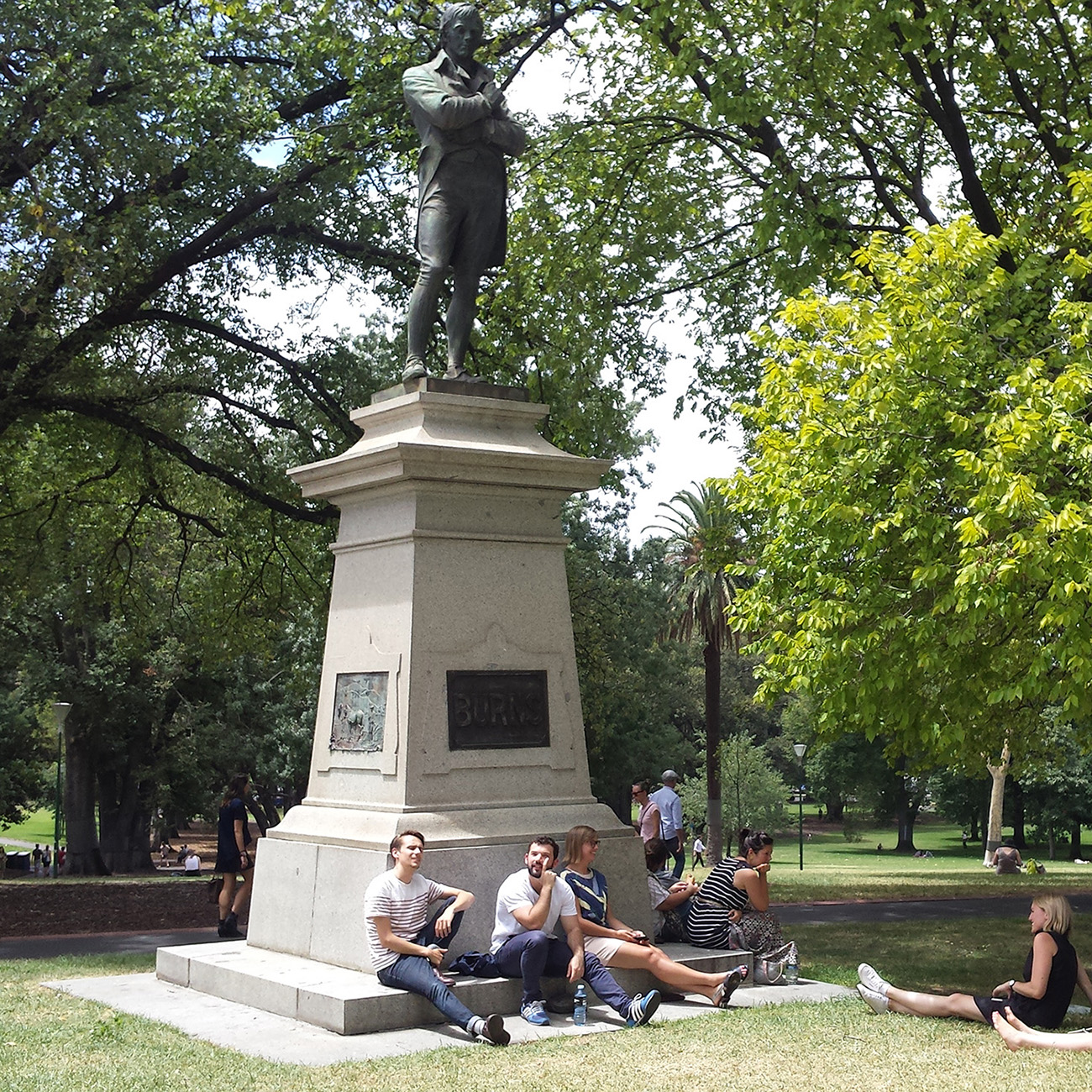
Burns statue in Treasury Gardens, Melbourne, Victoria, Australia

In Boston, Massachusetts within the Back Bay Fens is a life-size statue of Burns with his dog Luath, which was dedicated in 1920. In 1972 it was surreptitiously relocated to the city’s financial district, sparking protests from the neighbourhood, literary fans, and preservationists of Frederick Law Olmsted Jr.’s vision for the Fens. The statue was returned to the Fens in 2019. Nearby Kilmarnock Street, also in the city's Fenway neighborhood, is named in Burns’ honor.

In Quincy, Massachusetts at 37–45 Granite St. is a statue of Burns by sculptor John Horrigan, better known for his Titanic Memorial in Washington, D.C., which depicts Burns with a book standing by a sheaf of wheat; it was dedicated in 1925.

There is a statue of Burns in The Octagon, Dunedin, New Zealand, in the same pose as the one in Dundee. Dunedin's first European settlers were Scots; Thomas Burns, a nephew of Burns, was one of Dunedin's founding fathers.

In November 2012, Burns was awarded the title Honorary Chartered Surveyor by The Royal Institution of Chartered Surveyors, the only posthumous membership so far granted by the institution.

The oldest statue of Burns is in the town of Camperdown, Victoria. It now hosts an annual Robert Burns Scottish Festival in celebration of the statue and its history.

In 2020, the Robert Burns Academy in Cumnock, East Ayrshire opened and is named after Burns as an honour of Burns having spent time living in nearby Mauchline.

=== Stamps and currency ===
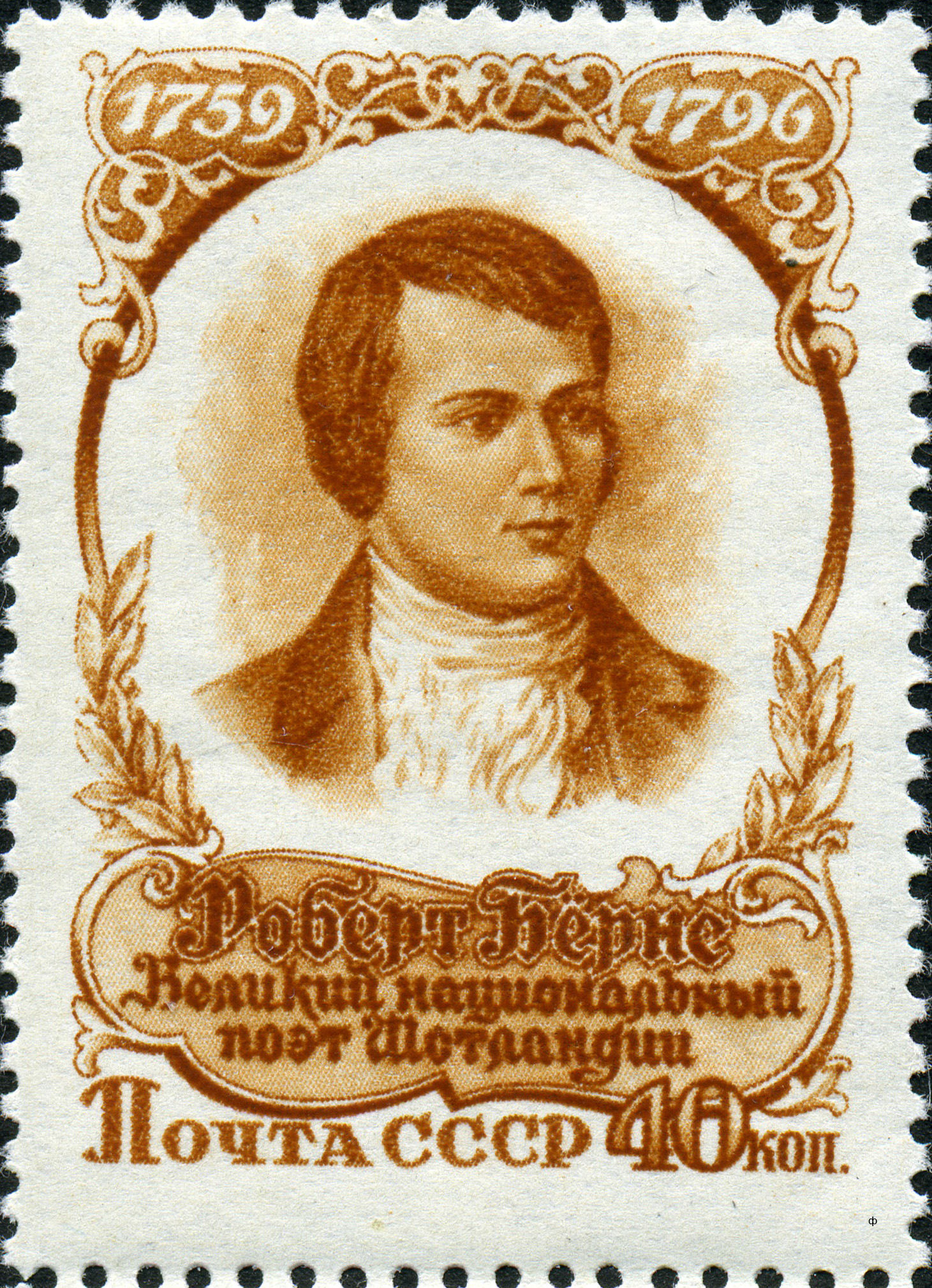
Burns stamp, USSR 1956

The Soviet Union was the first country in the world to honour Burns with a commemorative stamp, marking the 160th anniversary of his death in 1956.

The UK postal service, the Royal Mail, has issued postage stamps commemorating Burns three times. In 1966, two stamps were issued, priced fourpence and one shilling and threepence, both carrying Burns's portrait. In 1996, an issue commemorating the bicentenary of his death comprised four stamps, priced 19p, 25p, 41p and 60p and including quotes from Burns's poems. On 22 January 2009, two 1st class stamps were issued by the Royal Mail to commemorate the 250th anniversary of Burns's birth.

Burns is pictured on the Clydesdale Bank £5 note issued from 1971 to 2009. On the reverse of the note is a vignette of a field mouse and a wild rose, in reference to Burns's poem "To a Mouse". The Clydesdale Bank's notes were redesigned in 2009 and, since then, he has been pictured on the front of their £10 note. In September 2007, the Bank of Scotland redesigned their banknotes to feature famous Scottish bridges. The reverse side of new £5 features Brig o' Doon, famous from Burns's poem "Tam o' Shanter", and pictures the statue of Burns at that site.

In 1996, the Isle of Man issued a four-coin set of crown (5/—) pieces on the themes of "Auld Lang Syne", Edinburgh Castle, Revenue Cutter, and Writing Poems. Tristan da Cunha produced a gold £5 bicentenary coin.

In 2009 the Royal Mint issued a commemorative two pound coin featuring a quote from "Auld Lang Syne".

=== Portraits ===
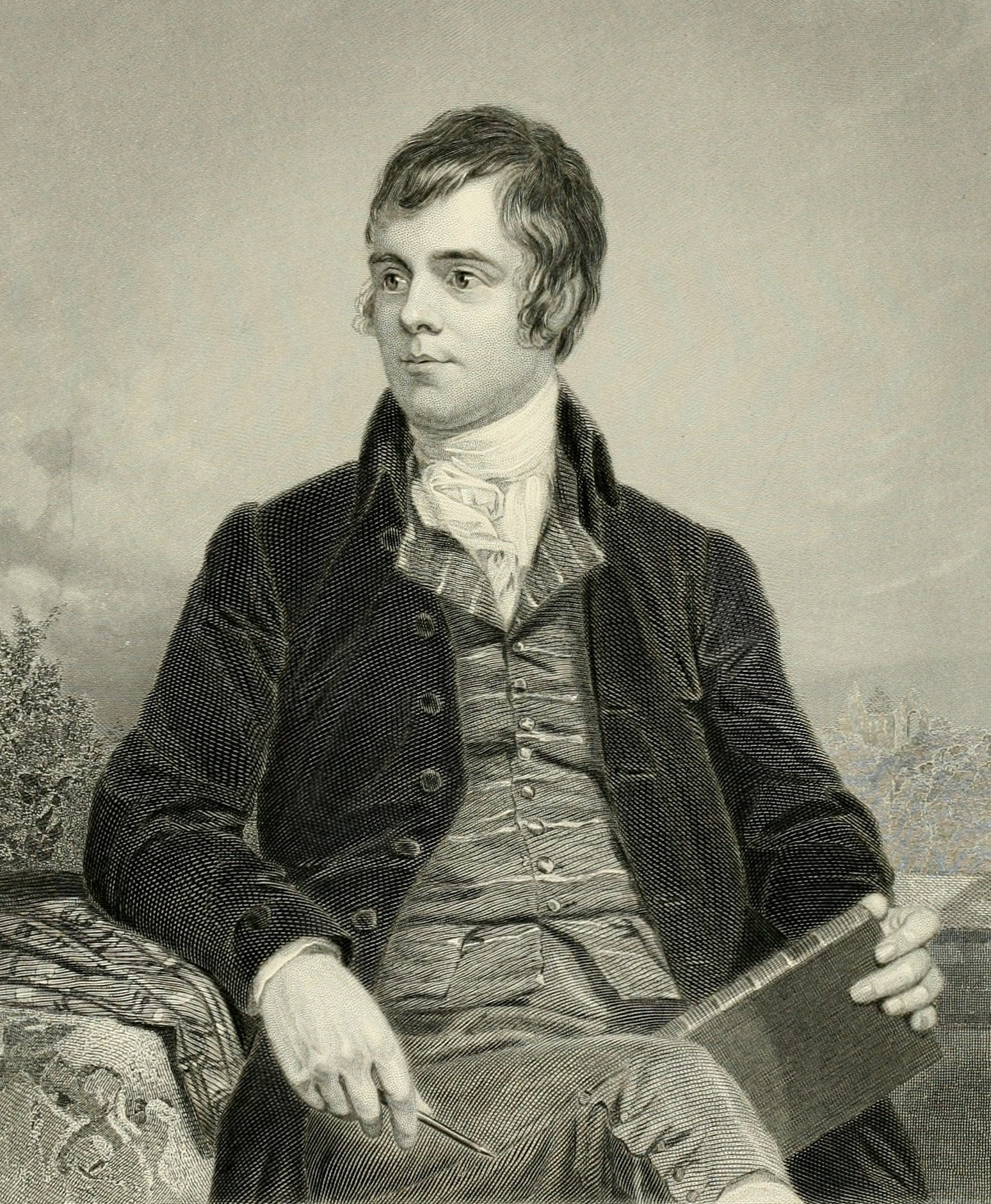
Engraved version of the Alexander Nasmyth 1787 portrait

The best known portrait of Burns is the one painted by Alexander Nasmyth in 1787. It was commissioned by William Creech to be engraved as the frontispiece for the first Edinburgh edition of Burns' poems. Burns had been introduced to Nasmyth by a mutual friend, the banker and inventor Patrick Miller of Dalswinton. Although Burns was described as a "reluctant sitter", he and Nasmyth became firm friends. Burns was a frequent visitor to Nasmyth's studio and they often walked together in the countryside.

The 1787 portrait has been used as the basis for many images of Burns, including on postage stamps, banknotes and merchandise. The original is now in the collection of the Scottish National Portrait Gallery.

In 1828 (32 years after Burns' death), Nasmyth created another portrait of him. This one shows Burns standing in front of the Brig o' Doon at Alloway.

In 1803, Henry Raeburn created a new image of Burns. It was commissioned by the publishers, Cadell & Davies, for a fee of 20 guineas. They intended to use it as the basis for an engraving for future editions of Burns' work. But although the painting was delivered a year later, it was never used. It subsequently disappeared. In 2025, Dr William Zachs, the director of the Blackie House Library in Edinburgh, purchased what appeared to be a portrait of Burns at a London auction house as part of a house clearance.The portrait was later verified as the missing Raeburn work. In January 2026, it went on display at the National Portrait Gallery. In July, it was transferred to the Robert Burns Birthplace Museum in Alloway.

=== Musical tributes ===
In 1976, singer Jean Redpath, in collaboration with composer Serge Hovey, started to record all of Burns's songs, with a mixture of traditional and Burns's own compositions. The project ended when Hovey died, after seven of the planned twenty-two volumes were completed. Redpath also recorded four cassettes of Burns's songs (re-issued as 3 CDs) for the Scots Musical Museum.

In 1996, a musical about Burns's life called Red Red Rose won third place at a competition for new musicals in Denmark. Robert Burns was played by John Barrowman. On 25 January 2008, a musical play about the love affair between Robert Burns and Nancy McLehose entitled Clarinda premiered in Edinburgh before touring Scotland. The plan was that Clarinda would make its American premiere in Atlantic Beach, Florida, at Atlantic Beach Experimental Theatre on 25 January 2013. Eddi Reader released two albums, Sings the Songs of Robert Burns and The Songs of Robert Burns Deluxe Edition, about the work of the poet.

Alfred B. Street wrote the words and Henry Tucker wrote the music for a song called Our Own Robbie Burns in 1856. Russian composer Tamara Popatenko (1912–1991) also set Burns' text to music.

=== Burns suppers ===
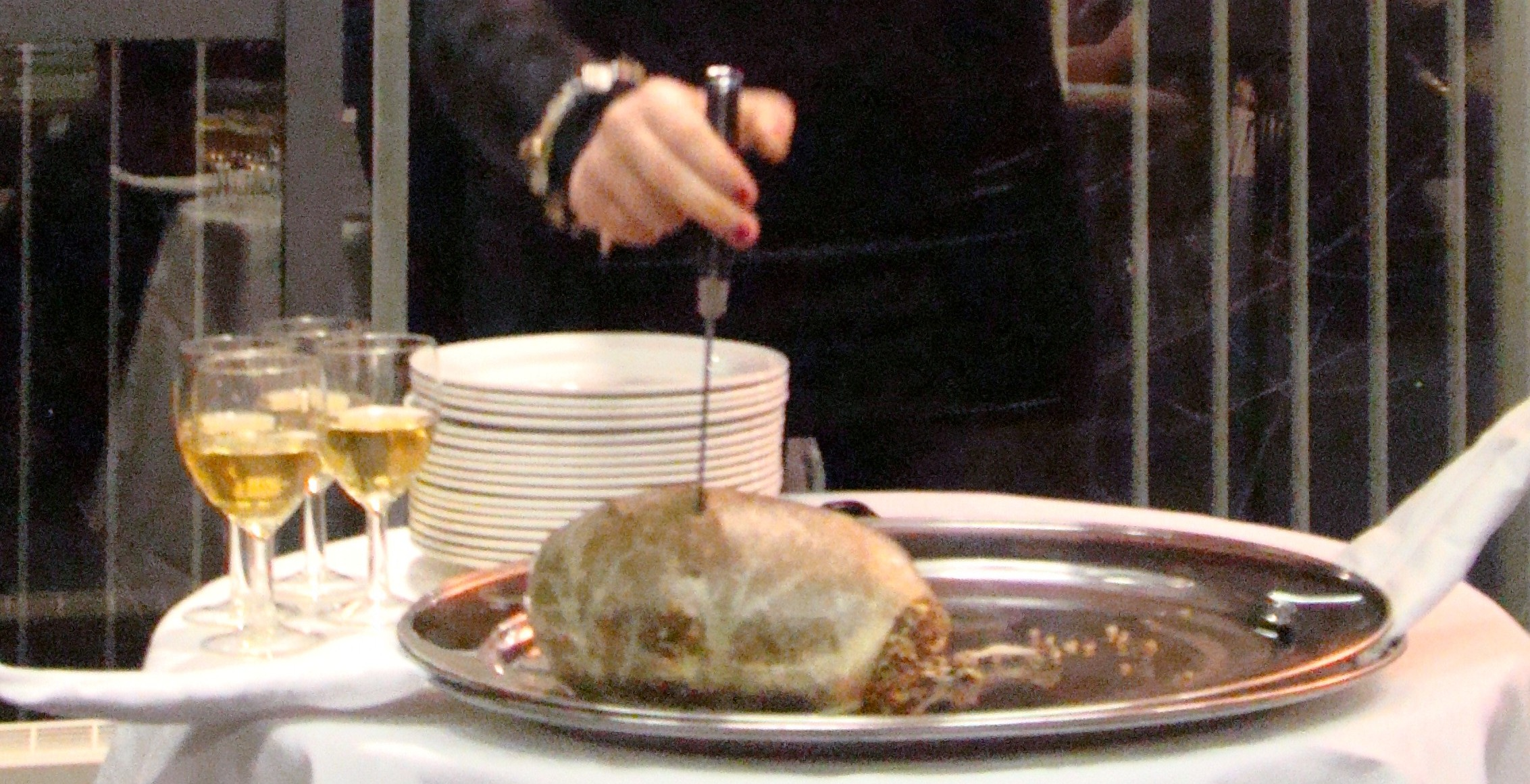
"Great chieftain o' the puddin-race!" – cutting the haggis at a Burns supper

Burns Night, in effect a second national day, is celebrated on Burns's birthday, 25 January, with Burns suppers around the world, and is more widely observed in Scotland than the official national day, St. Andrew's Day. The first Burns supper in The Mother Club in Greenock was held on what was thought to be his birthday on 29 January 1802; in 1803 it was discovered from the Ayr parish records that the correct date was 25 January 1759.

The format of Burns suppers has changed little since. The basic format starts with a general welcome and announcements, followed with the Selkirk Grace. After the grace comes the piping and cutting of the haggis, when Burns's famous "Address to a Haggis" is read and the haggis is cut open. The event usually allows for people to start eating just after the haggis is presented. At the end of the meal, a series of toasts, often including a "Toast to the Lassies", and replies are made. This is when the toast to "the immortal memory", an overview of Burns's life and work, is given. The event usually concludes with the singing of "Auld Lang Syne".

=== Greatest Scot ===
In 2009, STV ran a television series and public vote on who was "The Greatest Scot" of all time. Robert Burns won, narrowly beating William Wallace. A bust of Burns is in the Hall of Heroes of the National Wallace Monument in Stirling.

=== Crater ===
In 1985 the Burns crater on the planet Mercury was named in Burns' honour.

== See also ==
- Agnes Burns (sister)
- Alexander Tait (poet)
- Annabella Burns (sister)
- Elizabeth 'Betty' Burns
- Elizabeth Riddell Burns
- Glenriddell Manuscripts
- James Glencairn Burns (son)
- Jean Lorimer (Chloris)
- John Burns (farmer) (brother)
- List of 18th-century British working-class writers
- People on Scottish banknotes
- List of Robert Burns memorials
- Poems by David Sillar
- Poems, Chiefly in the Scottish Dialect (London Edition)
- Poems, Chiefly in the Scottish Dialect (Second Edinburgh Edition)
- Robert Aiken
- Robert Burns and the Eglinton Estate
- Robert Burns Junior (eldest son)
- Robert Burns's Commonplace Book 1783–1785
- Robert Burns's diamond point engravings
- Robert Burns's Interleaved Scots Musical Museum
- The Holy Tulzie
- The World of Robert Burns (educational software)
- William Burns (saddler) (brother)
- William Nicol Burns (son)
- Thomas White (headteacher)
