= Burns Cottage =

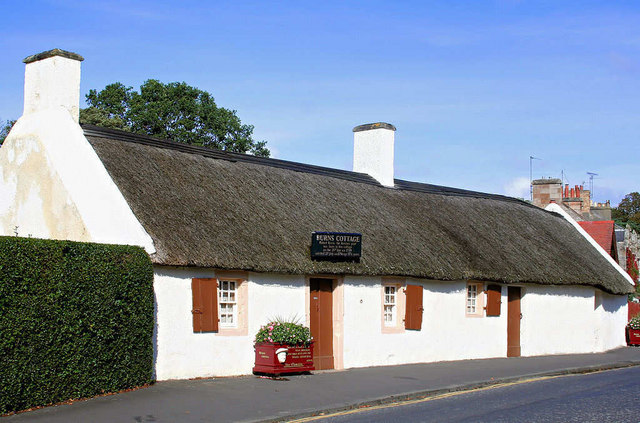
- Burns Cottage in October 2006

- Burns Cottage location
- Interactive map of Burns Cottage
- 55°25′58″N 04°38′06″W
- Type: Thatched cottage, open to the public as a museum
- Location: Alloway, Ayr, South Ayrshire, Scotland

History
- Built: 1757
- Original use: Home of Robert Burns and family

Site notes
- Owner: National Trust for Scotland

Listed Building – Category A
- Type: National or international importance
- Designated: 5 February 1971
- Reference no.: LB21476

Burns Cottage is the birthplace of Robert Burns, Scotland's national poet (or "bard"), who was born at the cottage on 25 January 1759. It is located in Alloway, a current suburb of Ayr, and a former village, located in South Ayrshire, Scotland. The cottage was built by Robert Burns' father, William Burnes in 1757 and is a four-roomed clay and thatch cottage which has been fully restored to become part of the Robert Burns Birthplace Museum.

Currently, the cottage is under the ownership and protection of the National Trust for Scotland, and forms part of a larger Robert Burns Birthplace Museum also located in Alloway.

== History ==
The cottage has had a number of uses, including a spell as a pub, run by a Mr Goudie from Riccarton who saw the opportunity to exploit Burns's developing reputation. (Note: Cottage for Sale — The cottage in which the Ayrshire Bard, Robert Burns, was born, which has been for years a well frequented inn, now advertised for sale by the incorporation of shoemakers of Ayr, to whom the premises present belong.) At first therefore the cottage was not greatly valued. The Suffragettes recognised its importance, having once endeavoured to set the cottage alight.

In 1818, the English poet John Keats took a trip to Scotland to visit the home, years after Burns' death in 1796. Before Keats arrived, he wrote to a friend that "one of the pleasantest means of annulling self is approaching such a shrine as the cottage of Burns – we need not think of his misery – that is all gone – bad luck to it – I shall look upon it all with unmixed pleasure." but his encounter with the cottage's alcoholic custodian returned him to thoughts of misery.

Throughout much of the 19th century, the cottage served as a privately rented residence and then became an alehouse, before being converted back to its appearance during the lifetime of Burns when his family lived within the cottage in 1881 by the Burns Monument Trust.

== Burns' lifetime ==
Robert Burns lived in the cottage until the age of seven years old, living alongside his family as well as their farm animals. Burns received his earliest form of education through homeschooling in the family kitchen located within the cottage. The Burns family later moved from the cottage to a larger house in the south–east of Alloway in order to accommodate the growing Burns family. Robert's father, William Burnes, sold the cottage to the Incorporation of Shoemakers which was located in Ayr.

Following the death of Burns in 1796, the cottage was being used as a pub. Due to the popularity of the pub following his death, the cottage had to be extended in order to accommodate increased volumes of visitors. Most of the extension which was constructed at this time was destroyed, leaving the cottage to be returned to its original appearance during the period Burns had lived there.

== The cottage ==
Burns Cottage is a long, low, thatched building which fronts onto the main street of Alloway, consisting of four rooms, two for human habitation and two for farm livestock. A relatively small kitchen and parlour is situated within the cottage linked by a byre and barn area. The kitchen also contains an alcove which houses a bed box in which Burns was born.

Over the years, much work and consideration has been given to preserving the cottage and its appearance to keep it similar to that during the lifetime of Burns. However, with a history of various ownerships, there has been some alteration and buildings works.

== Gallery ==
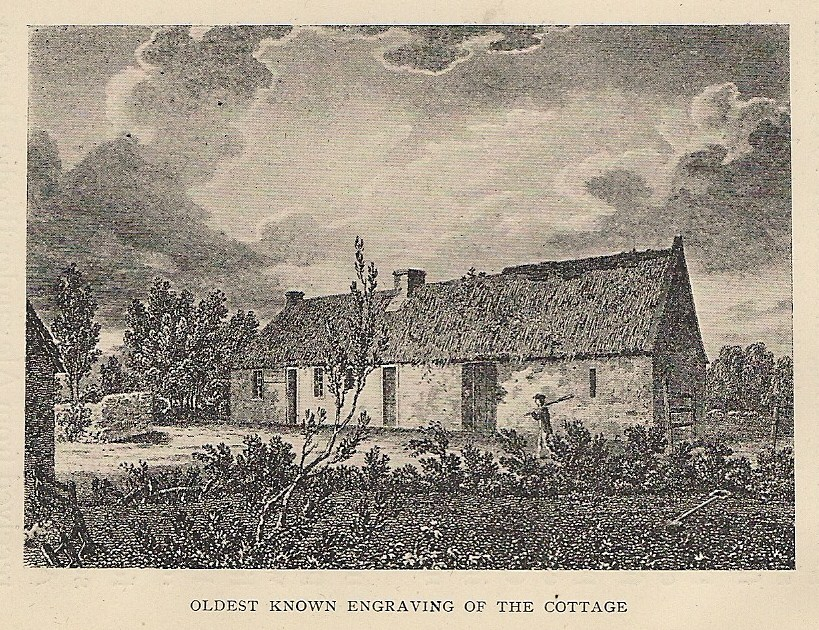
Oldest known engraving, 1805

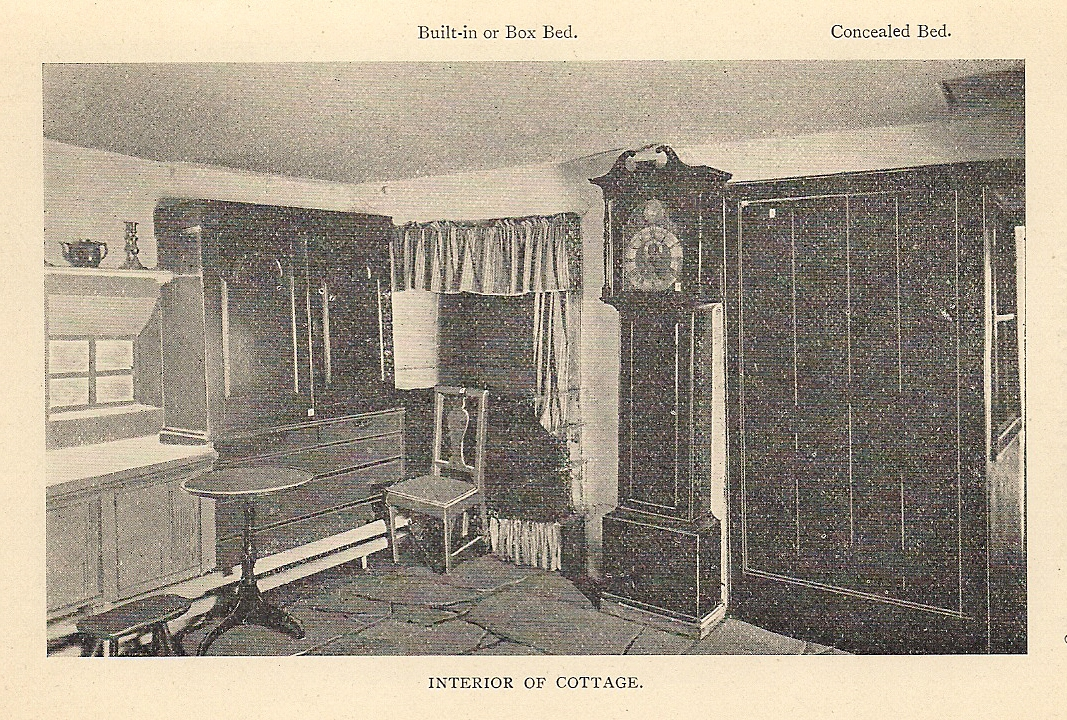
Bedroom

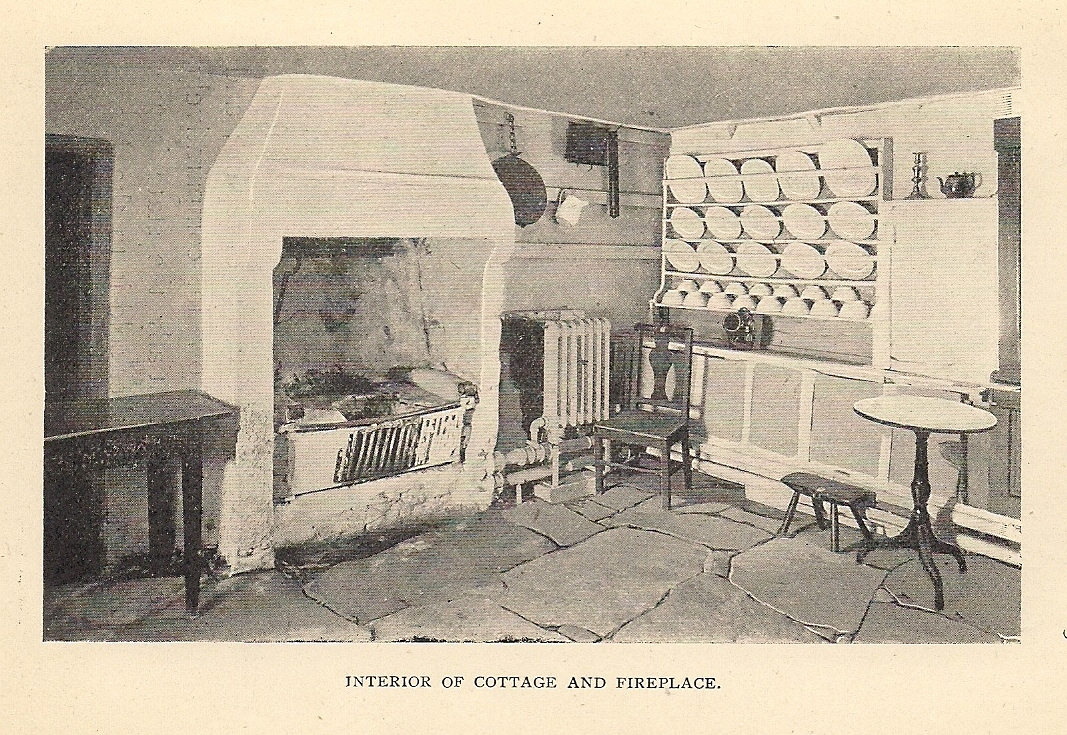
Kitchen

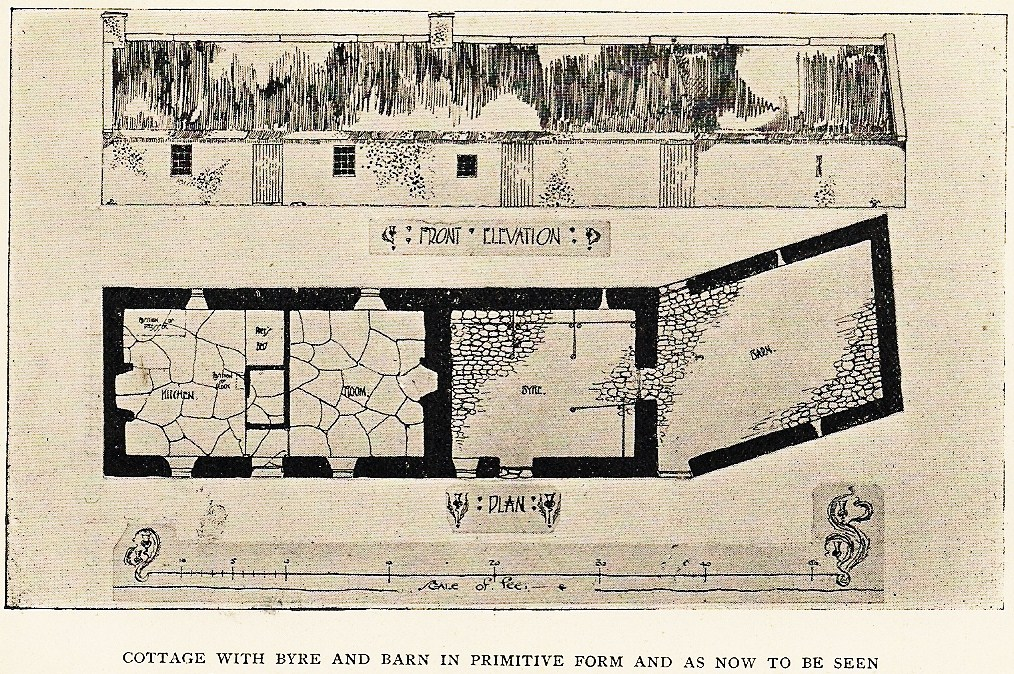
Plan and Elevation view

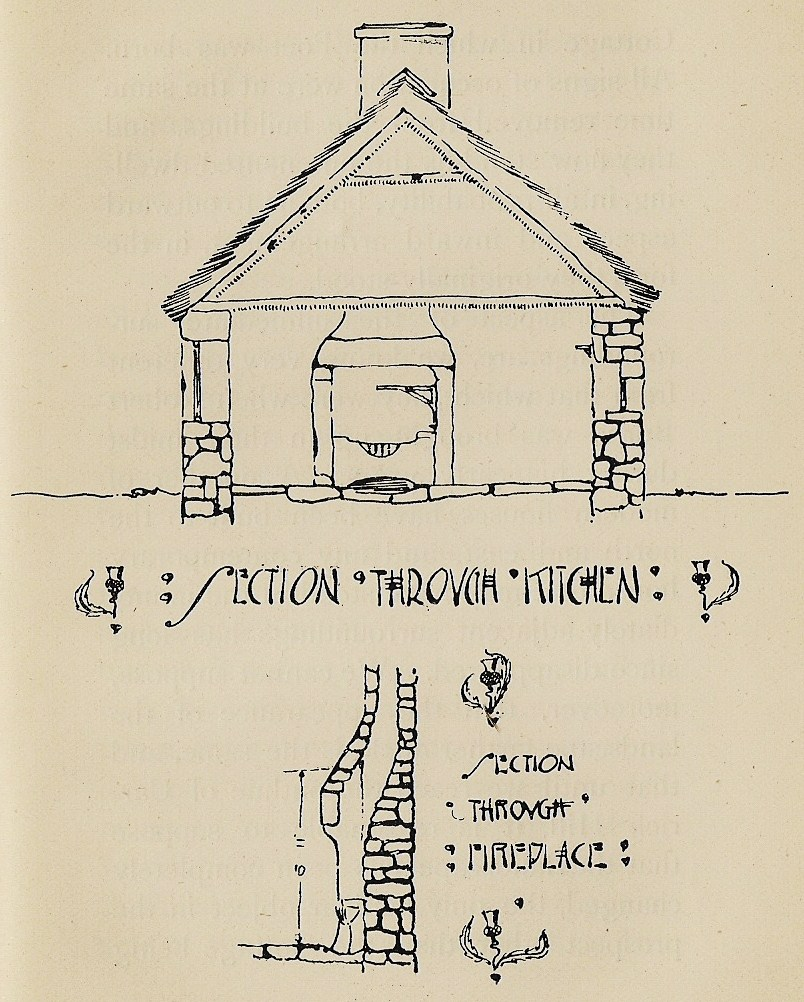
Cross section

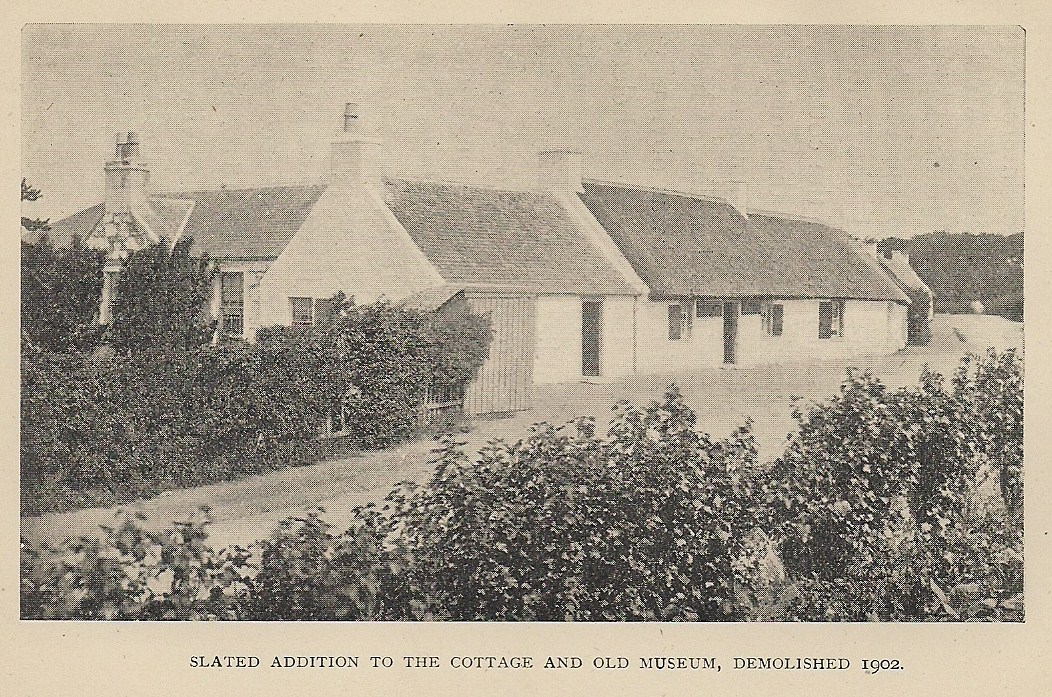
View of cottage with an addition, torn down in 1902

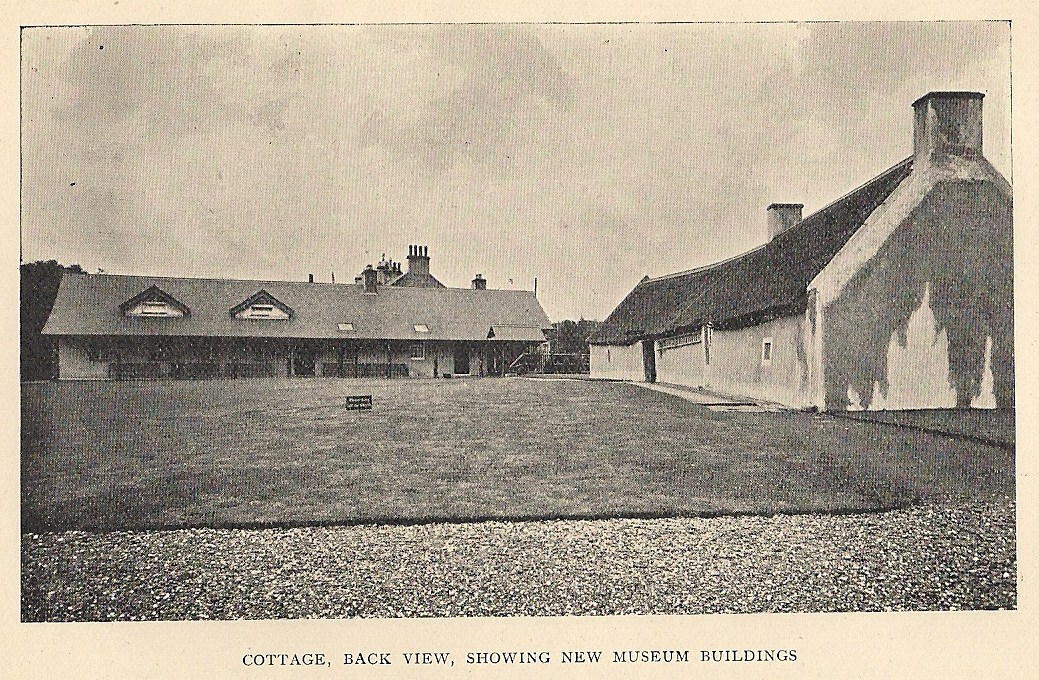
Back of cottage in 1904, showing then-new museum building

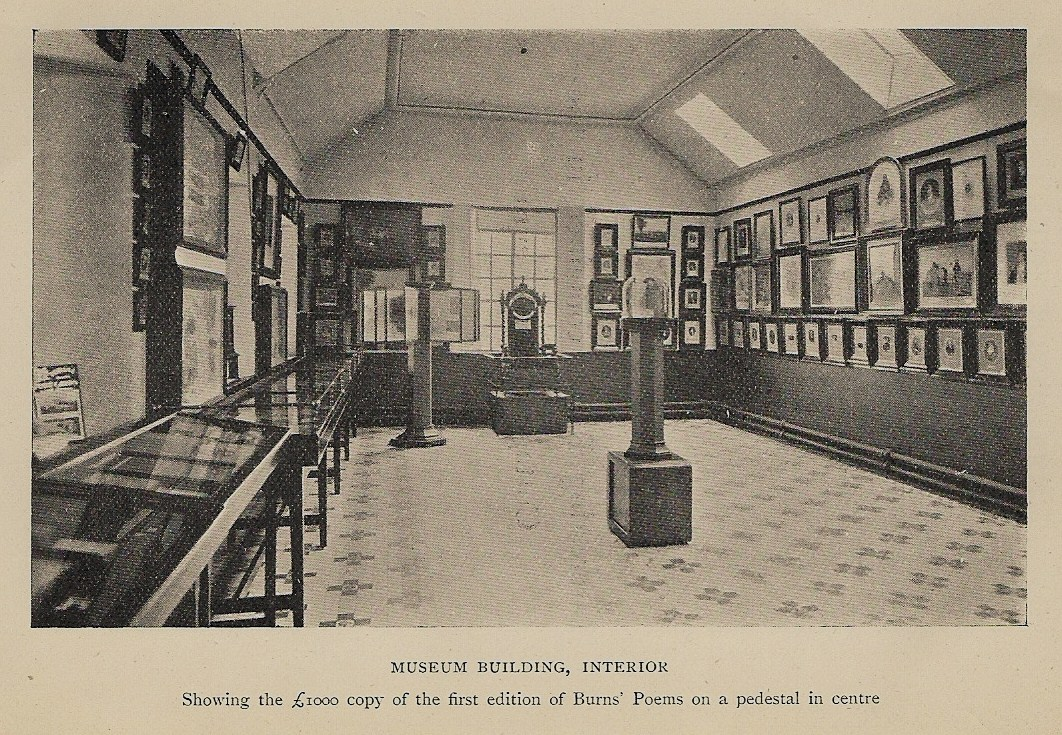
Interior of museum, 1904

== See also ==
- Burns Cottage (Atlanta), a reproduction of Burns' birthplace, built in 1911
