= Robert Burns Birthplace Museum =

Museum in Ayrshire, Scotland

Coordinates: 55.4276°N 4.6345°W

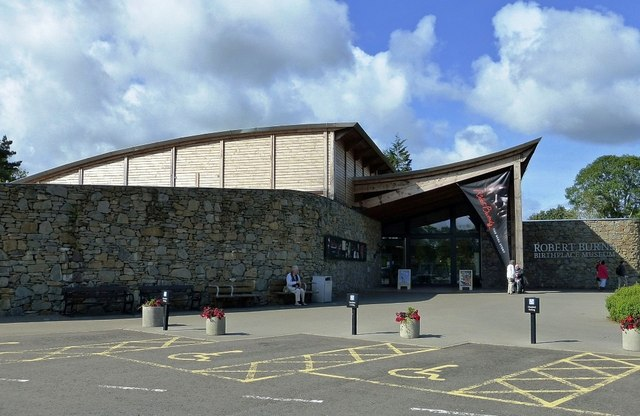
The Robert Burns Birthplace Museum, Alloway.

The Robert Burns Birthplace Museum is a museum which houses collections relating to the life of Robert Burns, Scotland's national Bard. It is run by the National Trust for Scotland (NTS) and is located within Alloway in Ayrshire, the village where Burns was born. It neighbours Burn's Cottage, the house in which Burns was born.

== History ==
A Burns based museum has existed in a form since 1903 as the Burns House Museum, and Burn's Cottage has exhibited Burn's related artefacts as early as the 1820's.

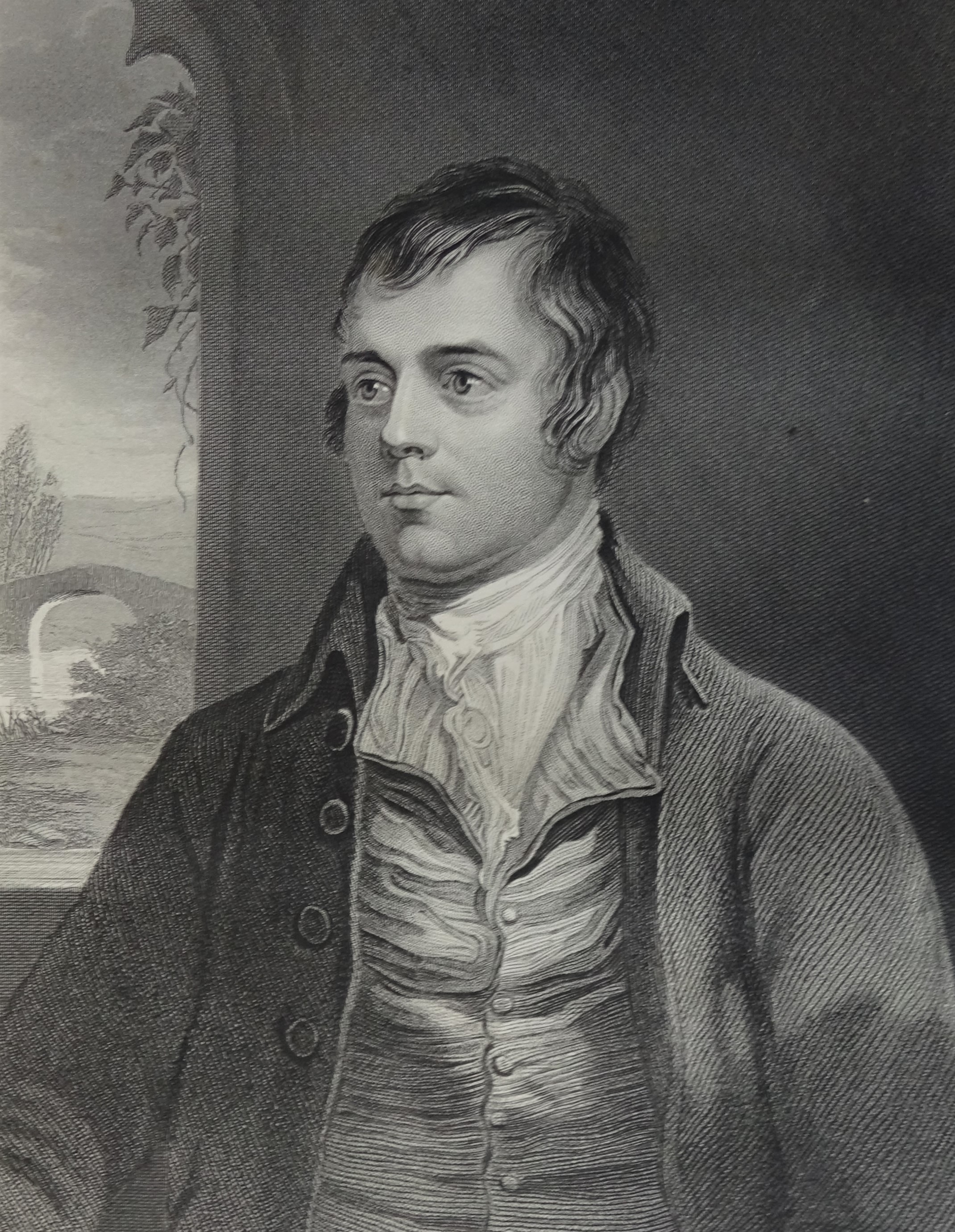
Robert Burns at Alloway, 1859.

The Robert Burns Birthplace Museum is run and owned by the NTS. It was opened in the form it is today in 2009, with £23 million being spent on the project. This NTS project was supported by Professor Robert Crawford of The University of St Andrews, participating in the Scottish Governments 'Homecoming 2009' scheme to boost Scottish tourism. Professor Crawford published a book, The Bard, Robert Burns, A Biography (2009), as the culmination of this research project.

== Public impact and collections ==
The museum houses more than 5,000 Burns inspired artefacts, including original written manuscripts.

It is second only to Shakespeare's museum in its number of visitor numbers out of all museums for UK writers. It has increased public engagement with Burns-related material, helped to boost tourism in Ayrshire and improved the visitor experience to the Burn's Cottage.
