= The Slave's Lament =

Song with lyrics attributed to Robert Burns

"The Slave's Lament" is a song first published in 1792 in volume four of the Scots Musical Museum.

It is often claimed that the lyrics were written by Robert Burns.

The song is the subject of Graham Fagen’s installation originally created in 2015 with the help of the composer Sally Beamish, reggae artist Ghetto Priest and producer Adrian Sherwood, for that year's La Biennale di Venezia, and in 2017 in the Scottish National Portrait Gallery, part of the 2017 Edinburgh Art Festival.
