= The Battle of Sherramuir =

1790 song by Robert Burns

"The Battle of Sherramuir" is a song written by the Scottish poet Robert Burns (25 January 1759 – 21 July 1796) about the Battle of Sheriffmuir which occurred in Scotland in 1715 at the height of the Jacobite rising in England and Scotland. It was written when Burns toured the Highlands in 1787 and first published in The Scots Musical Museum, 1790. It was written to be sung to the 'Cameronian Rant'.

The song was written as an adaptation of a broadside by John Barclay, called "Dialogue Between Will Lick-Ladle and Tom Clean-Cogue". Burns knew that the Battle of Sheriffmuir had ended so inconclusively that it was unclear which side had won. That knowledge formed the basis for the theme of the song which is written as an account of the battle by two shepherds taking contrary views of the events that unfolded.

One of the shepherds believes that "the red-coat lads wi' black cockades" routed the rebels, painting a fearful picture of how they managed to "hough the Clans like nine-pin kyles". The other shepherd is just as convinced that the Jacobites "did pursue / The horsemen back to Forth, man" with the eventual result that "...mony a huntit, poor Red-coat / For fear amaist did swarf, man."

== The original manuscript of "The Battle of Sherramuir" ==
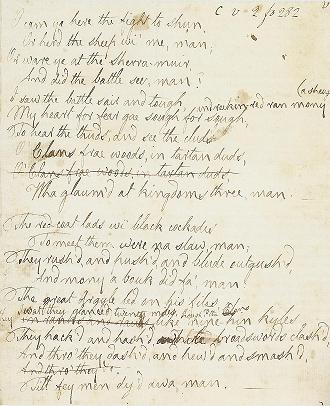
The original manuscript of "The Battle of Sherramuir".

Dissatisfied with the first published version of the song, Burns revised and re-wrote it sometime after 1790. The revised version was published after his death by his editor, James Currie M.D. in The Complete Poetical Works of Robert Burns: With Explanatory and Glossarial Notes; And a Life of the Author (1800). It is the revised version of the song, published by Currie, that is regarded as the definitive version of the song.

Until recently the source used by James Currie to publish the revised version of the song was unclear. Equally, the academic James Kinsley did not disclose the source for his analysis of the differences between the original and revised definitive version. In July 2007 the original manuscript containing Burns' revisions and amendments re-surfaced in the manuscript collection of the renowned Swiss manuscript collector Albin Schram. The manuscript was included as one of the most significant items in the auction of the Albin Schram Collection of Autograph Letters at Christie's in London which took place on 3 July 2007. It was acquired by an anonymous collector.

== Burns' revisions ==
The manuscript, in Burns' clear hand, also contained written notes by Currie thereby proving its provenance. The justification for the publication by Currie of all of Burns' revisions are contained in the manuscript. Burns dropped the chorus line of the original and made significant changes to stanza five and stanza six. In the revised stanza five, the more sceptical of the two shepherds blames the "Angus lads" for being too fond of their wooden bowls of porridge "cogs o'brose" to risk death in battle:

"The Angus lads had nae gude will,
That day their neebours' blude to spill,
For fear, by foes, that they should lose,
Their cogs o'brose; all crying woes,
And so it goes you see, man."

The last two lines are evidence of Burns' alteration of the original stanza five which read:

"Their cogs o'brose, they scar'd at blows,
And homeward fast did flee, man."

In stanza six, Burns changed the original lines:

"Lord Panmuir is slain,
Or in his en'mies' hands man,"

To negate the more general observation about "en'mies" to provide a much more specific account:

"Or fall'n in Whiggish hands, man."

That Scottish Tories gave their lives, while Whigs ran away, is the final wry observation, enlarged from three lines to four:

"Then ye may tell, how pell an mell,
By red claymores and musket's knell,
Wi'dying yell, how Tories fell,
And Whigs to hell,
Flew off in frighted bands, man."

However, a pen stroke through these very lines indicates Burns' dissatisfaction with them and his earlier three-line version is allowed to stand on the final page:

"Say, pell mell, wi' muskets' knell
How Tories fell, and Whigs to hell,
Flew off in frighted bands, man."

The manuscript shows that Currie adopted the new four-line version, in the editions he published from 1800 onwards, despite the fact that Burns had rejected it. He also adopted the title used in his own endorsement, omitted one of the best lines in stanza two, and made minor corrections. There are other deleted lines or half lines where Burns contemplated changes. On the one hand, some deletions and insertions seem to result from Burns writing in haste and either miscopying or misremembering the original.

All of the variations between the original version published in the Scottish Musical Museum and the definitive version published by Currie after Burns' death, including punctuation, are noted in James Kinsley's modern scholarly edition of "The Poems and Songs" (Oxford, 1968). Kinsley, however, omits to note that it was this manuscript, drafted by Burns, which led to the definitive version of the song published by James Currie.

== Acquisition of the manuscript by The National Library of Scotland ==
On 23 February 2009 the manuscript was acquired by the National Library of Scotland from Adams Hamilton the Washington, D.C.–based literary and historical manuscript dealers. It was on display from 24 to 25 February 2009 at a Burns symposium in the US capital's Library of Congress. Cate Newton, Director of Collections and Research said, "We are delighted to acquire the only known manuscript of The Battle of Sherra-moor". Alex Salmond, the First Minister, who saw the manuscript at the symposium said, "I'm delighted that this unique piece of Burns history will be coming home to Scotland in this, the 250th anniversary year of our national Bard."
