= James Currie (physician) =

Scottish physician (1756–1805)

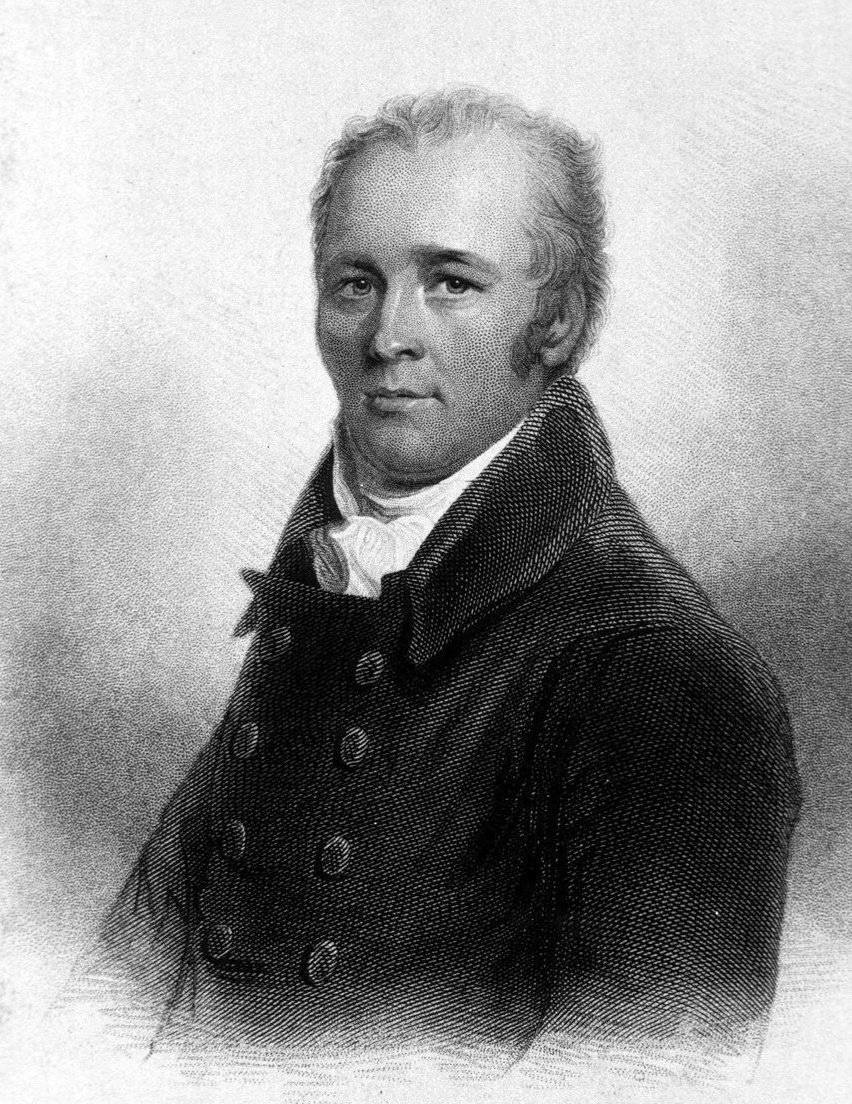
James Currie

James Currie FRS (31 May 1756 in Dumfriesshire, Scotland – 31 August 1805 in Sidmouth) was a Scottish physician, best known for his anthology and biography of Robert Burns and his medical reports on the use of water in the treatment of fever. A watercolour portrait by Horace Hone (1756–1825) is in the National Galleries of Scotland.

His early attempt to set up a merchanting business in Virginia was a failure and he returned to Scotland. After qualifying as a medical doctor he established a successful practice in Liverpool, England and after a few years was able to purchase a small estate in Dumfriesshire. He became a Fellow of the London Medical Society and was a founder member of the Liverpool Literary Society. He was an early advocate of the abolition of slavery and wrote several political letters and pamphlets, including one to William Pitt, which made him a number of enemies.

Throughout his life, he was dogged by illness and in 1804 he became seriously unwell. In an effort to find a cure, he relinquished his Liverpool practice and went to Bath, Clifton and finally Sidmouth, where he died on 31 August 1805 at age 49.

== Family and education ==
He was born in Kirkpatrick-Fleming, in Annandale, Dumfriesshire, a son of the minister, the Reverend James Currie, and Jane, the only daughter of Robert Boyd, of Dumfries. The Curries were an old Scottish family, descended from the Curries of Dunse, Berwickshire, and originally from the Corrie family of Annandale. James's first school was in the nearby parish of Middlebie, in Annandale, where his father had become Minister, and from age 13 he attended the grammar school in Dumfries, run by Dr George Chapman.

After a period in America, described below, he returned in 1776 to Scotland to study medicine at Edinburgh. During his first year at university he contracted rheumatic fever, a disease which recurred periodically throughout his life. He obtained his degree of M.D. in Glasgow and in 1780 settled in Liverpool, where he was appointed as one of the physicians at the infirmary.

He married Lucy Wallace in 1783, with whom he had five children. Her father was a prosperous merchant, a descendant of William Wallace, nicknamed The Hero of Scotland by Sir Walter Scott.

== Virginia ==
Attracted by the stories of prosperity in America he went in 1771 to Virginia, at that time a British colony, settling as a merchant on the James River, where he spent five hard years, much of the time ill and always in unprofitable commercial business. Trade between Britain and America suffered as a result of the dissension between the two countries and he turned his attention to politics. Under the misleading pseudonym 'An Old Man' he published a series of articles in defence of the right of the mother country to tax her colonies. He was an outspoken man, and his views were unlikely to have enhanced his business prospects.

The outbreak of the American Revolution ended any further chance of success and he sailed for home in the spring of 1776. The ship was captured by the revolutionary army. He was made to serve in the Colonial Army, but bought his freedom and made a second attempt to sail to England. He was captured again and this time he had to sail 150 miles in an open boat to gain his freedom. He reached Deptford, England, on 2 May 1777.

== Medical publications ==
Dr Currie used cold water treatments in the successful treatment of a contagious fever in Liverpool "and in 1797 made public his views and experiences, with a list of cures effected by his measures". This pamphlet, Medical Reports on the Effects of Water, Cold and Warm, as a Remedy in Fevers and Other Diseases (1797), had some influence in promoting the use of cold water affusion, and contains the first systematic record in English of clinical observations with the thermometer. A fourth edition was published in July 1805, the month before his death.

In the 1840s, there was a strong revival of interest in cold water cures, or hydropathy, following the promotion of Vincent Priessnitz's methods by Captain R. T. Claridge and others. Yet while acknowledging the contributions of Currie's predecessors, such as John Floyer, Claridge noted that "After all, the merit of settling the use of cold water on just a principle, belongs incontestably to our own countryman, Currie, whose work, published in 1797, upon the efficacy of water, may be considered the scientific base of Hydropathy".

== Anthology of Robert Burns ==
Currie was an admirer of Burns's poetry and met him once in Dumfries. One of his wife Lucy's relatives, Mrs Dunlop, was a close friend of the poet. Burns visited Mrs Dunlop at her home on five occasions and over a period of ten years they exchanged a great number of letters, 186 of which survive to this day. After Burns's death, Currie was entrusted with the publication of an authoritative anthology. Although inexperienced in such a task, he had many advantages, including access through Mrs Dunlop to original manuscripts of poems and letters and help from Gilbert Burns, Robert's brother, and several of Burns's friends. When The Complete Poetical Works of Robert Burns: With Explanatory and Glossarial Notes; And a Life of the Author was published in four volumes in 1800, it met with immediate success and second, third and fourth editions were published in 1801–3. In addition to containing revised versions of Burns' songs such as "The Battle of Sherramuir", it also contained an introductory criticism and an essay on the character and condition of the Scottish peasantry.

The work remains an authoritative source, but not without criticism. It is claimed that Currie exaggerated Burns's fondness for drink and that he deliberately misdated some of Burns's letters to Mrs Dunlop. An eighth edition, published in 1820, included an additional section Some Further Particulars of the Author's Life by Gilbert Burns. However, the publishers advised Gilbert not to impugn Currie's accuracy and the legend that Burns was an incurable alcoholic remained unchallenged.

== See also ==
- List of abolitionist forerunners
