= Poems, Chiefly in the Scottish Dialect (Dublin Variant) =

1787 collection of poems by Robert Burns

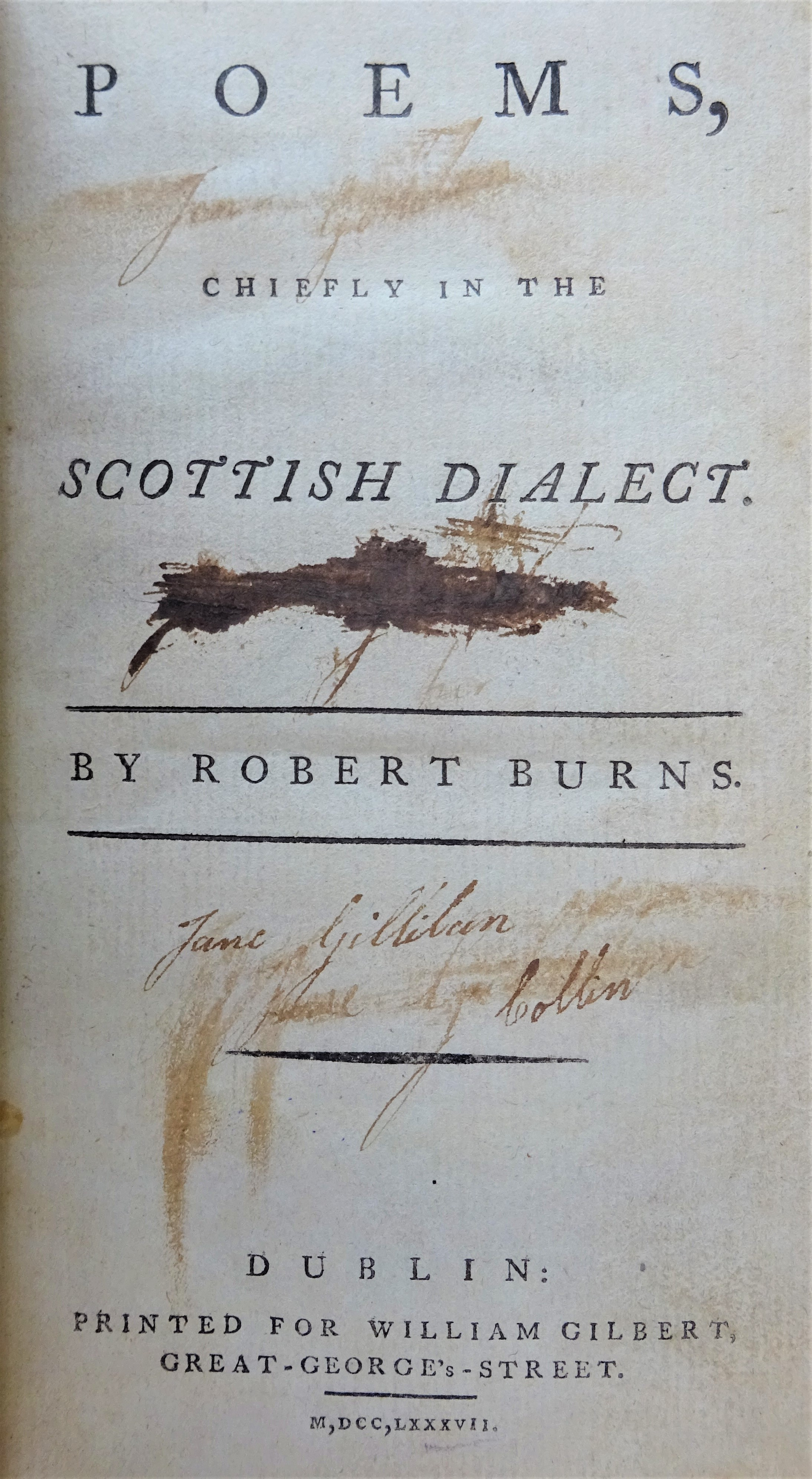
- Dublin Variant of 1787 – Title page
- Author: Robert Burns
- Original title: Poems, Chiefly Scottish
- Cover artist: Patrick Halpin, after Alexander Nasmyth
- Language: Scots & English
- Genre: Poetry and Lyrics
- Publisher: James Magee, Belfast
- Publication date: 1787
- Publication place: Great Britain

Poems, Chiefly in the Scottish Dialect (Dublin Variant) was the second "pirated" issue of Robert Burns's work, being published in Ireland at Belfast without permission from or payment to the author or publisher. It is a so-called Stinking Edition, carrying the error Stinking for the Scots word Skinking (watery) in the poem "To a Haggis" because the type setters copied from a 1787 Stinking Edition of Poems, Chiefly in the Scottish Dialect (Edinburgh Edition). It has been shown to be from the same print setting as the Belfast Edition but with a different title page.

This single volume issue is a collection of poetry and songs by Robert Burns, originally "Printed for the author and sold by William Creech" in Edinburgh. MDCCLXXXVII The date of publication for the Dublin Variant as advertised in Finn's Leinster Journal was 29 September 1787, making it the second unauthorised or "pirated" issue and the part of the third edition of the Poems, Chiefly in the Scottish Dialect. The Belfast Edition had been first advertised in the Belfast News Letter on 25 September 1787, making it a variant of the third edition of the poems and the first pirated' issue.

The Kilmarnock Edition had made Robert Burns Caledonia's Bard, whilst the Edinburgh Edition, the Belfast Edition, the Dublin Variant and the London Edition, all published in 1787, eventually elevated him into a position amongst the world's greatest poets.

The Burns Exhibition of 1896 had three copies of the Dublin Variant on display as well as the 1789 and later editions. James M'Kie, the publisher and great Burns collector, was not aware of the existence of the 1787 Dublin or Belfast editions and only lists the 1789 Dublin Edition in his Bibliotheca Burnsiana. Private Library of James M'Kie in 1866.

== The variant and its contents ==
It was part of the third published edition of Burns's poems, his first edition having been printed in Kilmarnock in 1786. The Belfast Edition cost 2 shillings, eight and a half pence in boards and 3 shillings, three pence bound, and the Dublin Variant would have been similarly priced. It is not known how many copies of the Dublin Variant were printed, the situation being complicated by it being part of the print run of James Magee's Belfast edition, issued under the imprint of William Gilbert, a bookseller.

Around 3,250 copies of the Edinburgh Edition were printed at 5 shillings for subscribers and 6 shillings for non-subscribers. Only 612 copies of the Kilmarnock Edition of which 88 are known to survive, but no record exists of the numbers of the Belfast and Dublin Edition that remain.

A single volume, it was again dedicated to the "Noblemen and Gentlemen of the Caledonian Hunt". The 1787 Dublin, Belfast and Edinburgh editions all contain an extra seventeen poems and five new songs, and most of the poems present in the 1786 Kilmarnock Edition are reprinted, such as "Halloween", "The Twa Dogs", "The Cotter's Saturday Night", "To a Mouse", etc. New poems included "Death and Doctor Hornbrook", "The Brigs of Ayr", "The Holy Fair", "John Barleycorn", "Address to the Unco Gui, or the Rigidly Righteous" and significantly "To a Haggis" (often given elsewhere as "Address to a Haggis").

The contents differ as the dedication is followed by Extracts from The Lounger, No.97; the Table of Contents, then the Text and finishing with the Glossary. It does not claim to have been "Entered into the Stationer's Hall", and no subscribers list was included. The title pages are very similar, however the Edinburgh Edition has the By of "By Robert Burns" on a line by itself.

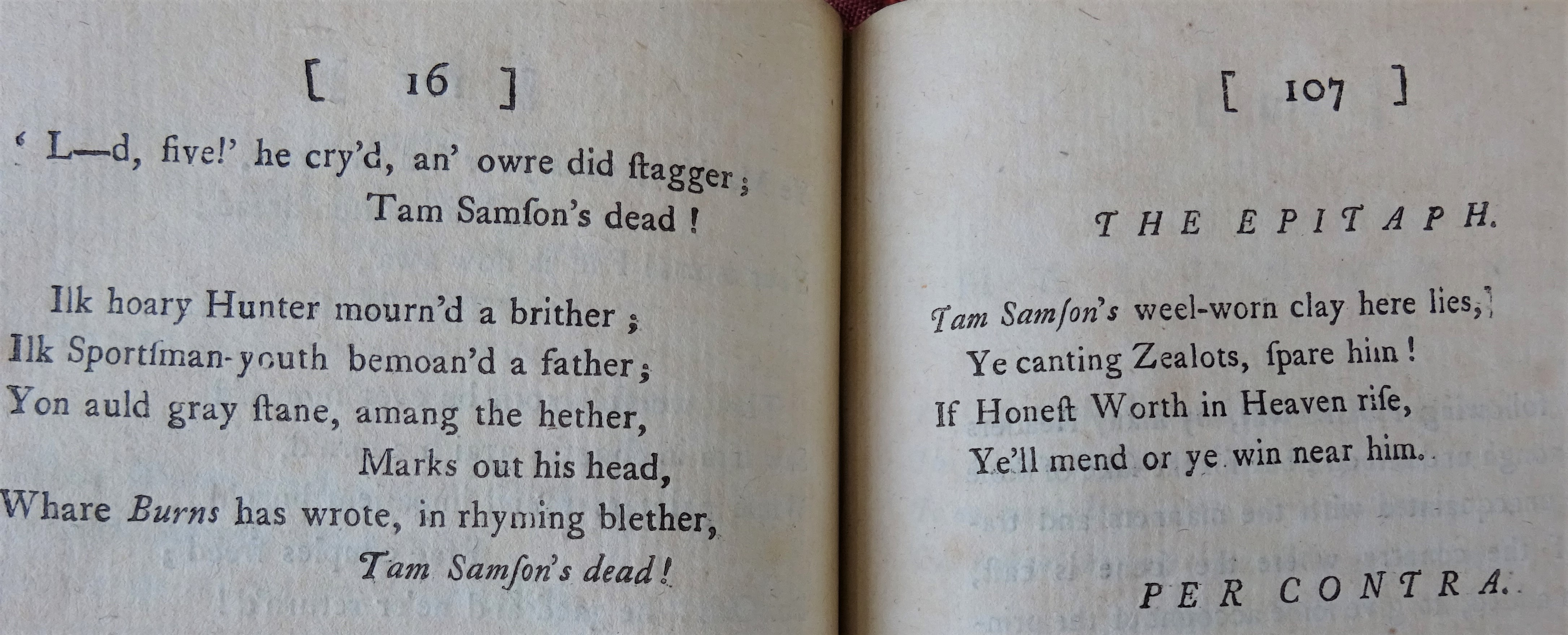
The page number error.

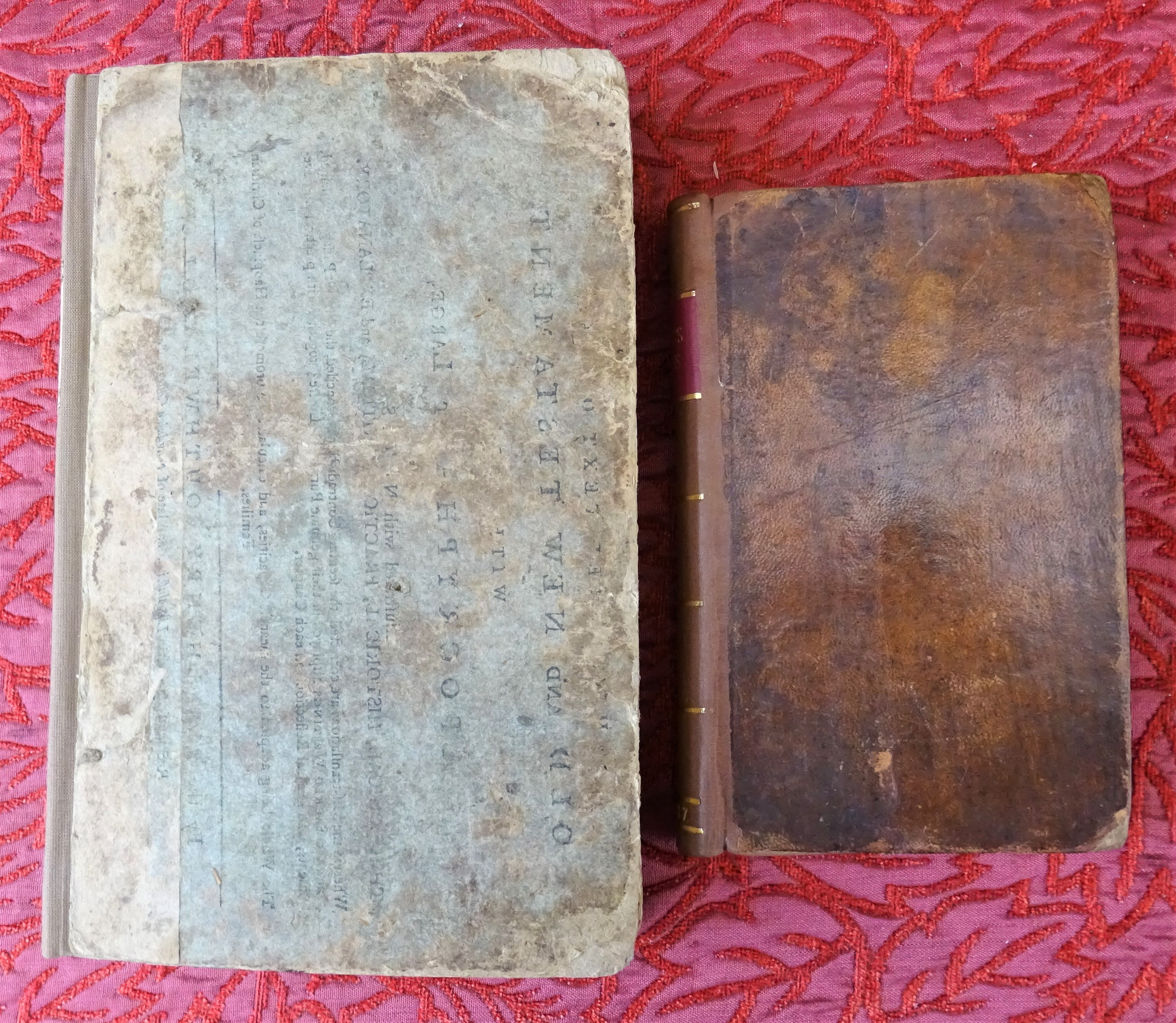
Comparison of the 1787 first octavo 'Edinburgh Edition' (left) and the 1787 'Dublin' duodecimo volume(right).

Nearly twice the length of the Kilmarnock Edition, it was printed in duodecimo rather than the demy octavo format of the Edinburgh Edition. The smaller size made the printing less expensive, and text from the octavo edition was condensed into a duodecimo of 286 text pages with a considerable saving in paper, a valuable material before the regular use of wood pulp paper; 368 pages was the comparable length of the first Edinburgh Edition. Interestingly in this context William Gilbert was a signatory to a "Petition to the House of Commons respecting paper" in 1773.

The volume was published in French gray paper "printers" boards. Measuring 15.7 cm by 9.5 cm trimmed, it included the expanded glossary or "dictionary" of the Scots language for those unfamiliar with the many Scots words that Burns used. The "chain and line" or laid paper used for the text has a watermark, but unlike the Edinburgh Edition paper, it is not a fleur-de-lis, but a diamond and the plumed headwear of a cavalier, the watermark of the French papermaker, B. Brun of Angouleme.

Burns used annotations to clarify or enhance the understanding of his works such as with Halloween on page 109 and his notes on the "Cove of Colean" (Culzean) as the Elfhame, or home of the fairies.

=== Printing errors ===
Unique to the Dublin and Belfast Editions are a few printing errors, such as the absence of a signature on page one and [ 16 ] on page [ 160 ]. Other errors are Nineteenth rather than Ninetieth on the Contents Page and on page 171 for the title of the poem "The First Six Verses of the Ninetieth Psalm", and finally on page 188 "A Dedication to G**** H*******, Efq;" is printed with an 'O' replacing the 'G'. Some punctuation and capitalisation differences exist, such as "Lammas Night" rather than "Lammas night".

=== The Stinking Edition ===
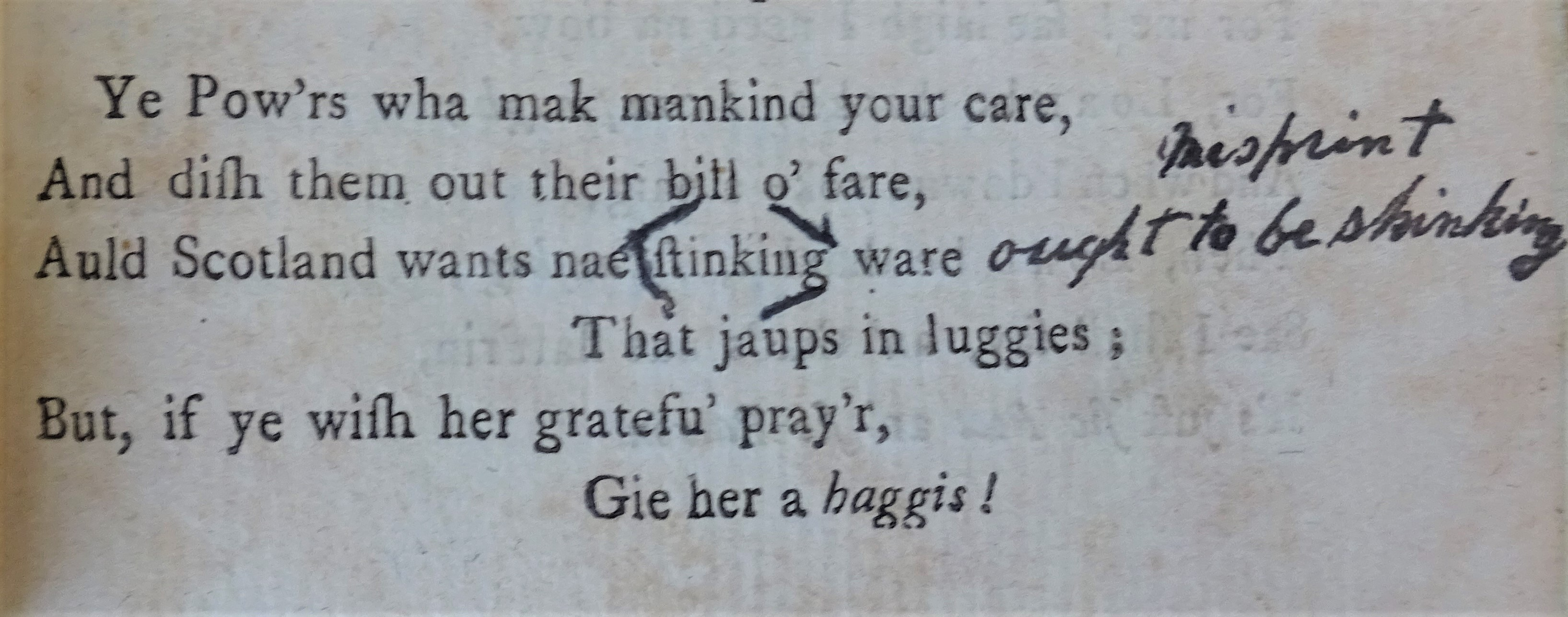
The 'Stinking' misprint.

The Stinking Edition or Stinking Burns is so called because of the original spelling mistake in the partial second impression of the Edinburgh Edition, found also here in the Belfast and Dublin editions. The origin of the error is because William Smellie had printed a first run of pages as far as the gathering or signature Mm when he discovered that he had insufficient copies to cover all the subscribers, and due to a shortage of type he was forced to reset the printing blocks and repeat the run as a partial second impression. In the haste to reset the blocks a large number of mainly minor errors were introduced, the most famous of which is the substitution of a t for a k that converted the Scots word skinking (meaning watery) into stinking. Around 1000 out of 3000 copies of the 1787 Edinburgh Edition carried the error.

=== The bookseller ===
William Gilbert, bookseller, of Dublin, is thought to have had a connection with the well known printer and publisher James Magee of Bridge Street, Belfast, possibly as a business partner. 26 South Great George's Street, Dublin is the address given in the 1795 Wilson's Dublin Directory; however, the bookshop was likely to have been at No. 46. Printed in Belfast by James Magee, the Dublin variant appeared under William Gilbert's name. It was also part of the first edition published outside of Scotland.

== The portrait of Robert Burns ==
William Creech commissioned Alexander Nasmyth to paint Burns's portrait, from which John Beugo engraved the copper plate required for the printing process. The Belfast and Dublin editions however had a frontispiece engraving by Patrick Halpin, rather than the Beugo engraving. Burns's image looks to the left in Beugo's engraving, but Halpin's portrait looks to the right.

== Subsequent editions ==
In 1789, the variant was re-issued by William Gilbert from the same address.

In 1793, a two volume Second Edinburgh Edition was published, much enlarged and for the first time containing the poem "Tam o' Shanter", although It had already appeared in such publications as the second volume of Francis Grose's Antiquities of Scotland, for which it was originally written.

Other 18th century editions are those published in London, Philadelphia and then New York, not always with the authors' knowledge or with the permission of William Creech, the copyright holder. Thomas Stewart's 1802 edition is notorious for having included a section with twenty-five letters written by Sylvander Robert Burns to Clarinda Agnes Maclehose, without the permission of the copyright holders. The copyright for the 1787 Edinburgh Edition expired in 1801.

== The poems and songs of the 1787 Robert Burns unauthorised Dublin Variant ==
1. The Twa Dogs. A Tale
2. Scotch Drink
3. The Author's Earnest Cry and Prayer to the Scotch Representatives in the House of Commons
4. The Holy Fair *
5. Death and Doctor Hornbook *
6. The Brigs of Ayr *
7. The Ordination *
8. The Calf *
9. Address to the Deil
10. The Death and Dying Words of Poor Mailie
11. Poor Mailie's Elegy
12. To J. S**** (James Smith)
13. A Dream
14. The Vision
15. Address to the Unco Guid, or the Rigidly Righteous *
16. Tam Samson's Elegy *
17. Halloween
18. The Auld Farmer's New-Year Morning's Salutation to his Auld Mare, Maggie
19. The Cotter's Saturday Night, inscribed to R. A. Esq
20. To a Mouse, on turning her up in her Nest, with the Plough, November, 1785
21. A Winter Night *
22. Epistle to Davie, a Brother Poet
23. The Lament
24. Despondency. An Ode
25. Man was made to Mourn. An Elegy
26. Winter. A Dirge
27. A Prayer, in the Prospect of Death
28. Stanzas on the same occasion *
29. Verses left at a Friend's House *
30. The First Psalm*
31. A Prayer *
32. The First Six Verses of the Ninetieth Psalm (Printed in error as Nineteenth) *
33. To a Mountain-Daisy, on turning one down, with the Plough, in April, 1786
34. To Ruin
35. To Miss L____, with Beattie's Poems for a New-year's Gift (Logan) *
36. Epistle to a Young Friend
37. On a Scotch Bard gone to the West Indies
38. To a Haggis *
39. A Dedication to G**** H******* Esq; (Gavin Hamilton) *
40. To a Louse, on seeing one on a Lady's bonnet at Church
41. Address to Edinburgh *
42. Epistle to J. L*****, an old Scotch Bard (John Lapraik)
43. To the same
44. Epistle to W. S*****, Ochiltree (William Simpson)
45. Epistle to J. R******, inclosing some Poems (John Rankine)
46. John Barleycorn. A Ballad *
47. A Fragment, 'When Guilford good our Pilot stood,' *
48. Song, 'It was upon a Lammas night'
49. Song, 'Now westlin winds and slaughtering guns'
50. Song, 'Behind yon hills where Stinchar flows' *
51. Green grow the Rashes. A Fragment *
52. Song, 'Again rejoicing Nature sees' *
53. Song, 'The gloomy Night is gath'ring fast' *
54. Song, 'From thee, Eliza, I must go'
55. The Farewell. To the Brethren of St James's Lodge, Tarbolton
56. Song, 'No churchman am I for to rail and to write' *
57. Epitaph on a celebrated Ruling Elder
58. _______ on a noisy Polemic
59. _______ on Wee Johnie
60. _______ for the Author's Father
61. _______ for R. A. Esq; (Robert Aitken)
62. _______ for G. H. Esq; (Gavin Hamilton)
63. A Bard's Epitaph
- A poem or song not printed in the Kilmarnock Edition of 1786.

( ) – The missing name from the poem or song.

Burns, as illustrated above, used a variety of methods to keep the names of individuals more or less hidden, such as with a series of asterisks between a first and last letter denoting missing letters, a solid line giving no clue to the number of letters or initials only.

== See also ==
- A Manual of Religious Belief
- Poems, Chiefly in the Scottish Dialect (Edinburgh Edition)
- Poems, Chiefly in the Scottish Dialect (Belfast Edition)
- Poems, Chiefly in the Scottish Dialect (Second Edinburgh Edition)
- Robert Burns World Federation
- Burns Clubs
- Irvine Burns Club
- Poems by David Sillar
