= Poems, Chiefly in the Scottish Dialect (Second Edinburgh Edition) =

1793 collection of poems and songs by Robert Burns

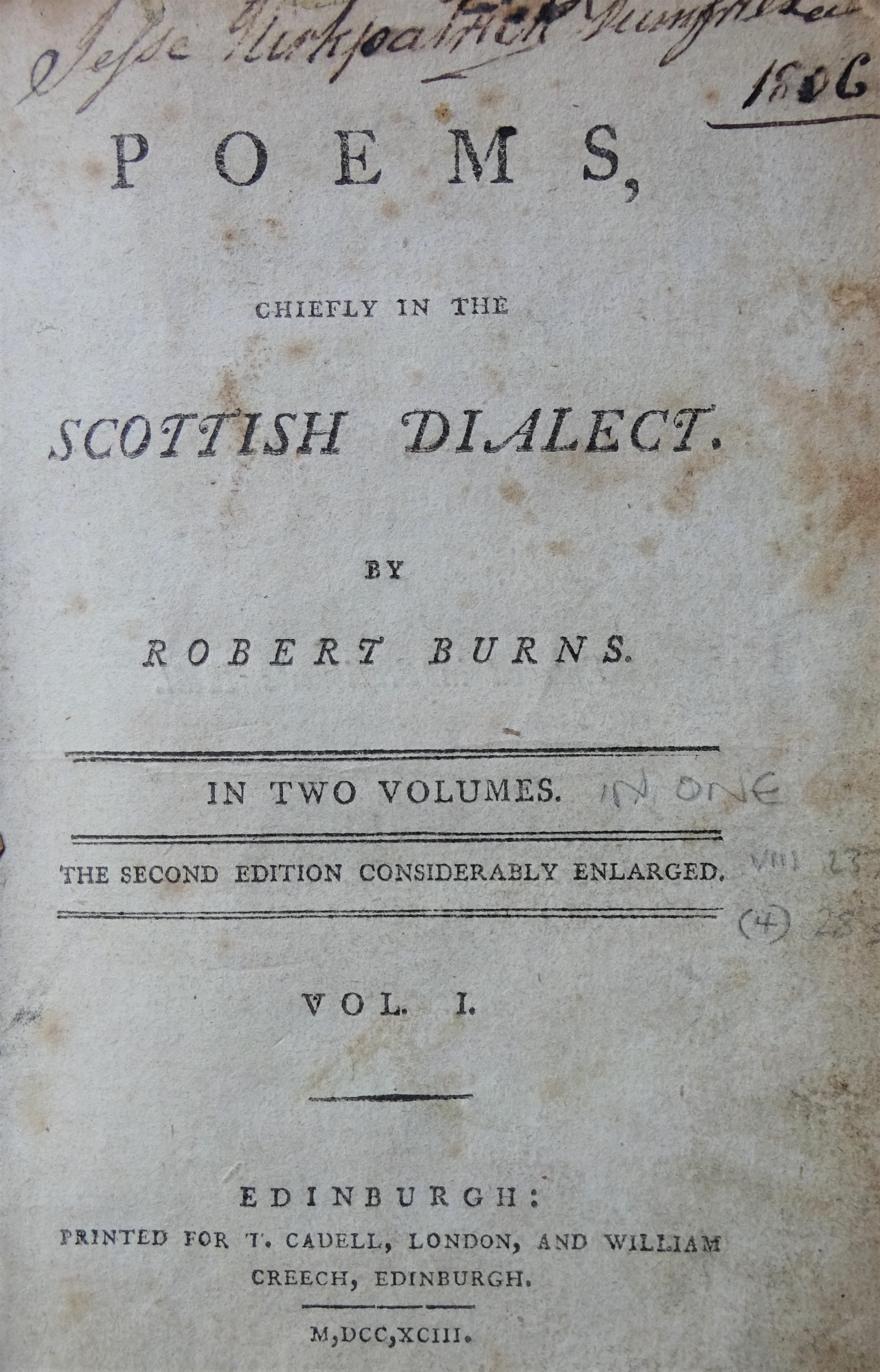
- Second Edinburgh Edition of 1793 in 'Two Volumes, The Second Edition, Considerably Enlarged'.
- Author: Robert Burns
- Original title: Poems, Chiefly Scottish
- Cover artist: John Beugo after Alexander Nasmyth
- Language: Scots & English
- Genre: Poetry and Lyrics
- Publisher: T. Cadell of London; William Creech of Edinburgh
- Publication date: 1793
- Publication place: Great Britain

Poems, Chiefly in the Scottish Dialect (Second Edinburgh Edition) was issued during the poet's lifetime In Two Volumes. The Second Edition Considerably Enlarged. It is a collection of poetry and songs by the poet Robert Burns, printed for T. Cadell, London, and W. Creech, Edinburgh. M,DCC,XCIII The date of publication for this edition was 16 February 1793 as advertised in the Edinburgh Courant. The successful demand for the 1787 Edinburgh Edition seems to have encouraged Creech to publish this new edition as the 1787 volume had been sold out since around 1791.

== The Previous Editions and their contents ==
Burns's first edition of Poems, Chiefly in the Scottish Dialect had been printed in Kilmarnock in 1786 and unofficial editions were published in Belfast and Dublin making the 1787 London Edition the fifth collected edition of his poems followed by others in 1788 in Philadelphia and New York.

Around 3,250 copies of the first Edinburgh Edition were printed and only 612 copies of the 1786 Kilmarnock Edition of which 86 are known to survive, but no clear record exists of the numbers of the London Edition and Edinburgh Edition that are extant.

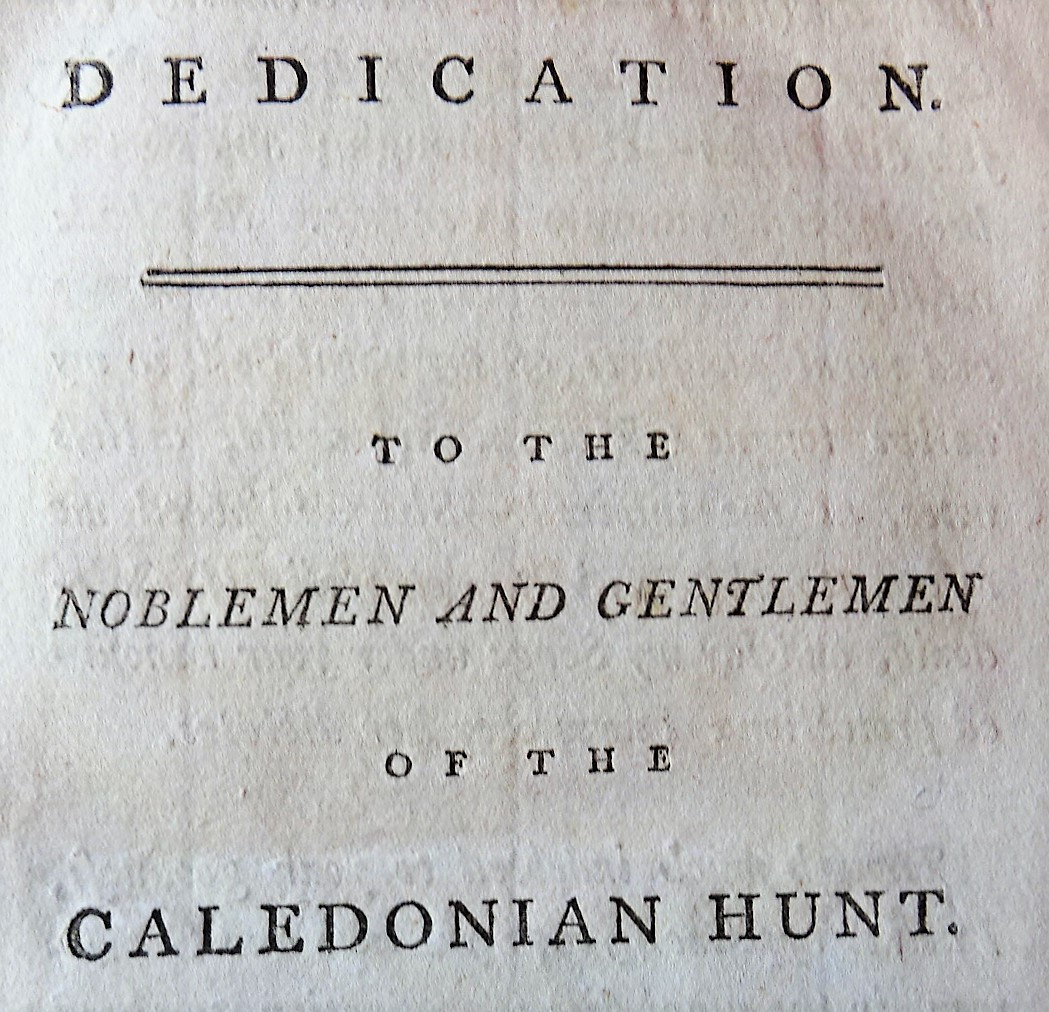
Dedication of the Edinburgh Edition of 1793 to the Caledonian Hunt.

The 1787 London and Edinburgh editions contained an extra seventeen poems and five new songs. In addition most of the poems present in the 1786 Kilmarnock Edition are reprinted such as "Halloween", "The Twa Dogs", "The Cotter's Saturday Night", "To a Mouse", etc. New poems included Death and Doctor Hornbook, The Brigs of Ayr, The Holy Fair, John Barleycorn, Address to the Unco Guid, or the Rigidly Righteous and significantly To a Haggis (often given elsewhere as Address to a Haggis). Of the seven new songs Green grow the Rashes. A Fragment is an example of Burns's gift for re-working traditional folk-verse.

The 1787 Edinburgh Edition was nearly twice the length of the Kilmarnock Edition of 1786 and it was printed in octavo format, measuring 22.3 x 14.6 cm, untrimmed, had 372 pages, a 38-page subscribers list and the expanded 24-page glossary or 'dictionary' of Scots words for those unfamiliar with the language. It was published in French gray paper 'printers' boards with most copies subsequently being cut and ornately bound once purchased so that uncut copies in the original printer's boards with a cream paper spine and label are exceedingly rare. It is not clear whether or not the 500 or so Edinburgh Edition copies sold in London had a new title page inserted bearing the names of Strahan and Cadell as well as Creech.

=== Background to the 1793 publication ===
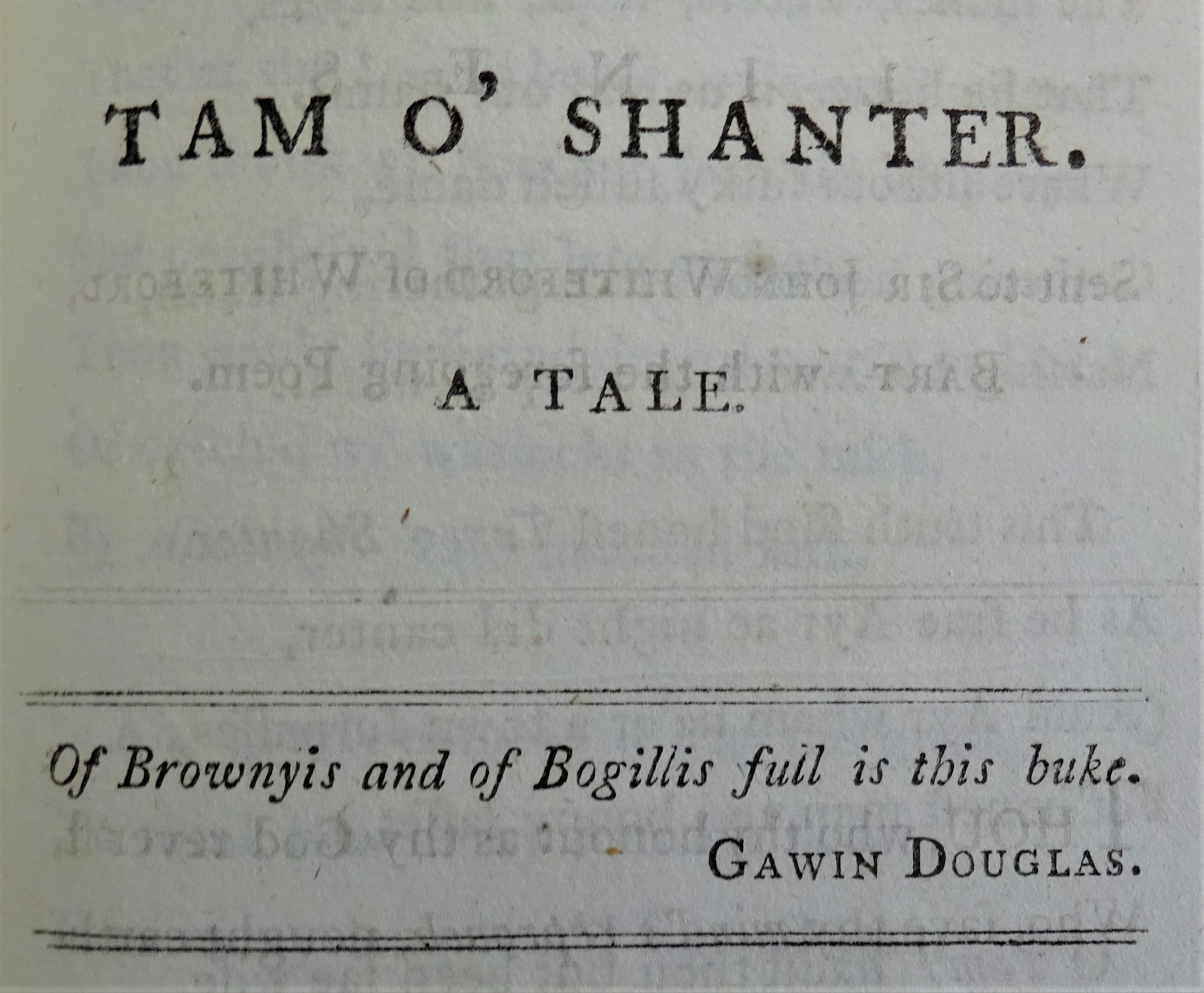
Title page to Tam O'Shanter.

Since 1786 Robert Burns had written many new sings and poems and despite five years having passed since his appearance on the Scottish literary scene, William Creech surmised that a public appetite still existed for his work and an expanded edition would likely be profitable. Accordingly, in March or April 1792 Creech wrote to Burns, in the knowledge of course that he already held the copyright for all the poems in the 1787 Edinburgh Edition. He appears to have asked the poet for a price regarding new works and what material he had available, and in due course Burns wrote back, saying:

"I suppose, at a gross guess that I could add of new materials to your two volumes, about fifty pages. I would also correct and retrench a good deal. These said fifty pages you know are as much mine as the thumb-stall I have just now drawn on my finger which I unfortunately gashed in mending my pen. A few Books which I very much want, are all the recompence I crave, together with as many copies of the new edition of my own works as Friendship or Gratitude shall prompt me to present (italics)."

=== The 1793 Edinburgh Edition ===
The 1793 two volume Edinburgh Edition was published, much enlarged and for the first time containing the poem Tam o' Shanter. The poem had already appeared in The Edinburgh Herald, 18 March 1791; the Edinburgh Magazine, March 1791 and in the second volume of Francis Grose's Antiquities of Scotland of 1791 for which it was originally written. The volumes were again dedicated to the Noblemen and Gentlemen of the Caledonian Hunt with the same date of April 4, 1787.

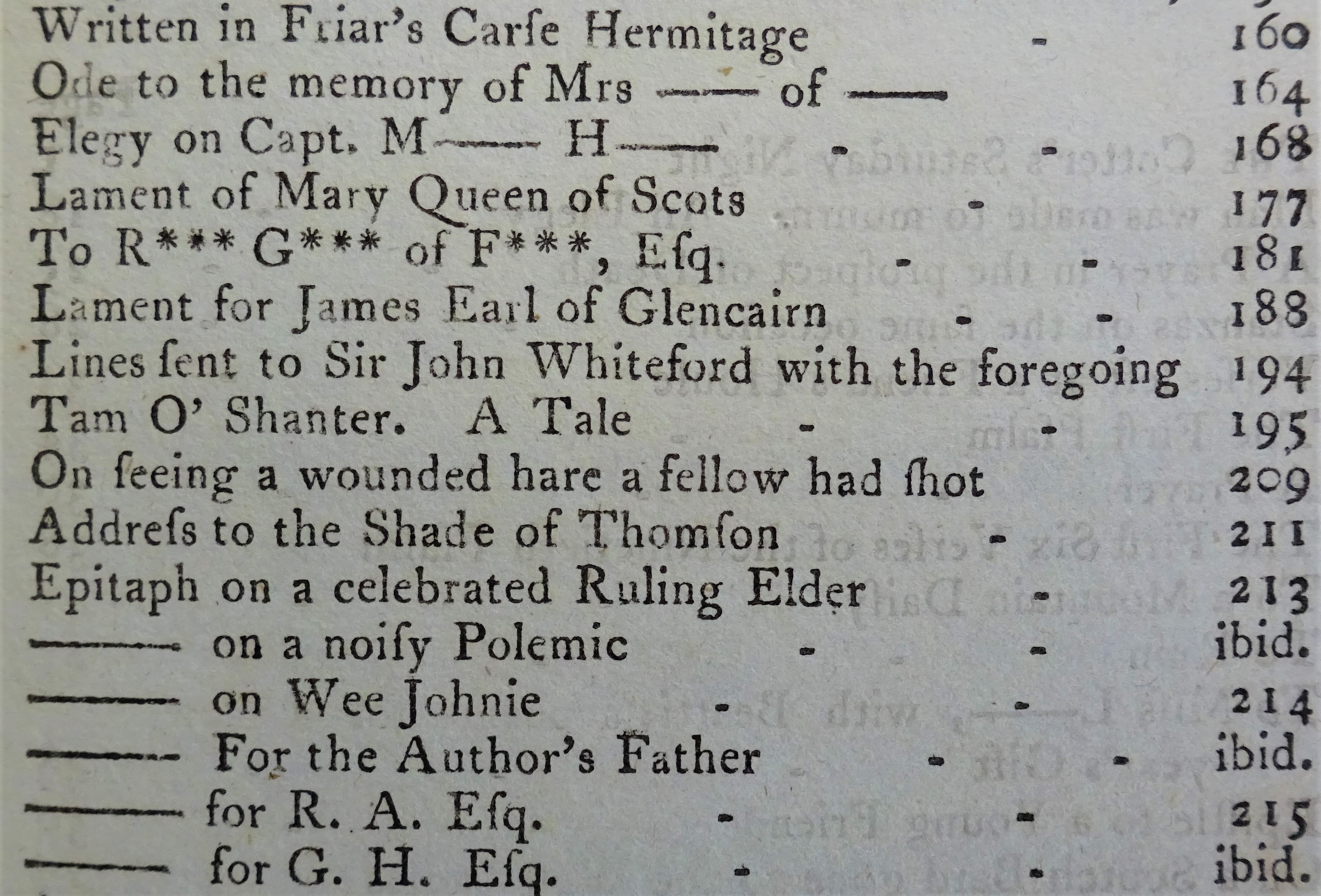
The Tam O'Shanter Listing.

Burns was involved in ... correcting and retrenching to some small extent as the National Library of Scotland copy has corrections in his own hand. Alexander Fraser Tytler is credited with correcting the 1793 Edinburgh Edition proof. He was a great admirer of Burns's works and was the eldest son of William Tytler of Woodhouselee.

==== Sequence of works ====
The sequence of the contents in Volume I has the frontispiece portrait, the title page, the contents, the dedication, followed by the poems and songs and finally the extensive glossary. Volume II had no portrait or contents pages. Unlike the London Edition no subscribers list was published in either volume. Although published as two volumes, to save money on binding some purchasers had the volumes were bound up together.

The sequence of the poems follows that of the 1787 Edinburgh Edition until The Cotter's Saturday Night, which was moved to head Volume II and then the same 1787 sequence until Man was made to Mourn. A Elegy. which was moved to second place in Volume II. The sequence is again kept until a series of original works are inserted, starting with Written in Friar's Carse Hermitage after Song, No churchman am I for to rail and to write. until Address to the shade of Thomson is reached and finally after A Bard's Epitaph original works run until the glossary is reached. It is not clear why the sequence was changed as Volume I was issued 237 pages long as compared with Volume II at 283 pages long.

==== Details of the size, signatures, etc. ====
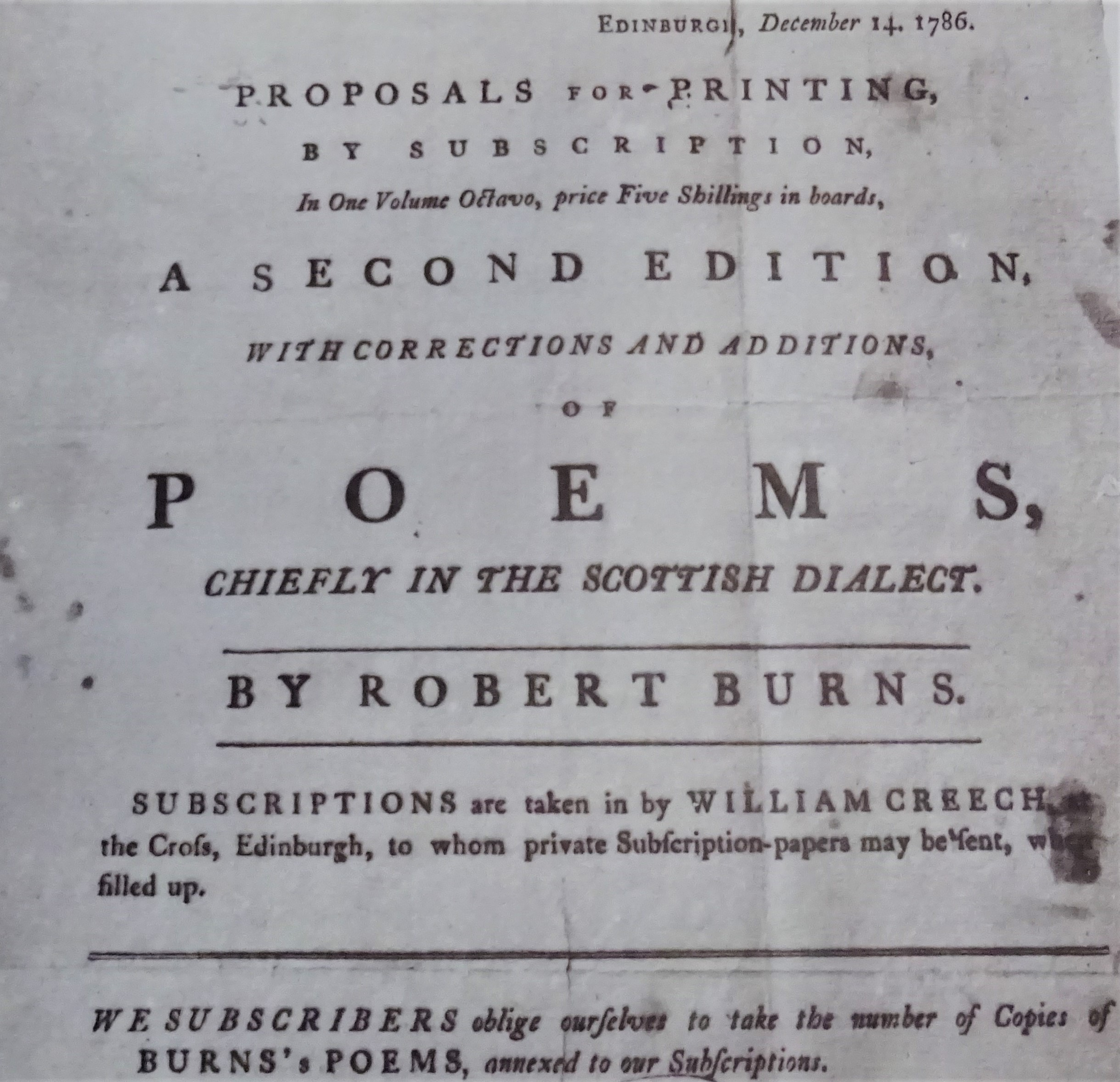
The Advertisement for the 1787 Edinburgh Edition.

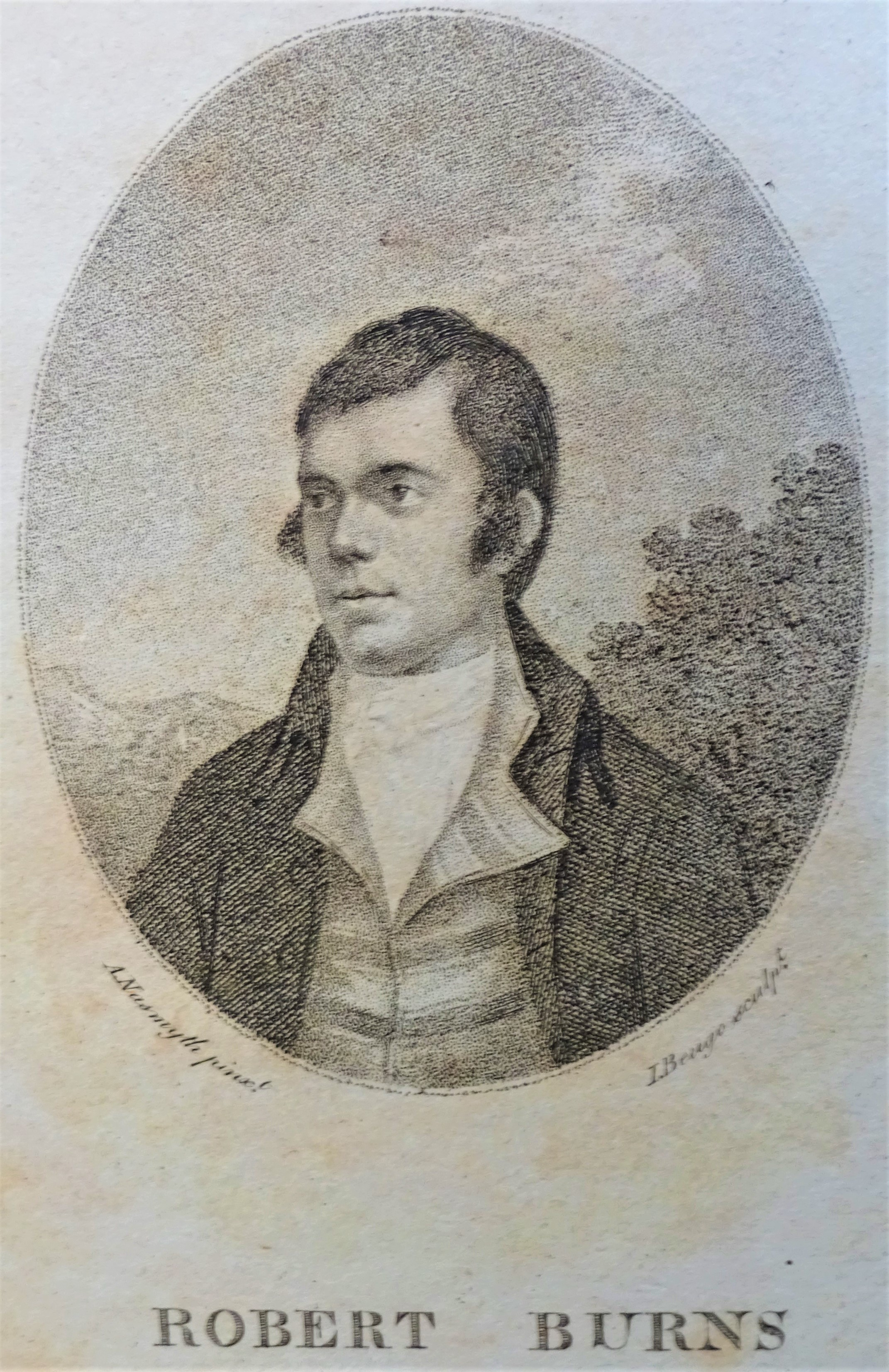
Burns's portrait by John Beugo.

The 1793 Edinburgh Edition volumes were both printed in 12mo or duodecimo, with twelve leaves per sheet format, measuring 20.4 x 12.7 cm, untrimmed, had 522 pages total with 237 pages in Volume I and 283 pages in volume II; a 27-page glossary or 'dictionary' of Scots words was appended for those unfamiliar with the language. For reasons unknown a few words from the original 1786 glossary were omitted from the expanded versions, such as Taet meaning a small quantity. Burns did not expand the 1787 glossary to cover the 1793 or 1794 editions. The two volumes together were 150 pages or nearly 40% longer than the 1787 Edinburgh Edition. The Kilmarnock Edition and the 1787 Edinburgh Editions had been printed in octavo.

It was published in 'printers' boards with most copies subsequently being cut and more or less ornately bound as two volumes. The signatures run from A-K12 in Volume I and the first six leaves of each sheet are signed. In Volume II the signatures run from A-L12 and M10. The fleurons are all simple double, diamond or broken rule lines.

No 'chain and line' was used, only wove and the volumes therefore do not carry a watermark and the portrait of Burns on the frontispiece is also on wove paper.

Burns had added a number of annotations to clarify or enhance the understanding of his works that were included here, such as with Halloween and his notes on the 'Cove of Colean' (Culzean) as the Elfhame or home of the fairies.

Six of the original holograph manuscript versions of the poems published in the Kilmarnock, Edinburgh, London and later editions are in the possession of the Irvine Burns Club in North Ayrshire, who also possess a copy of the 1786 Kilmarnock Edition and the 1787 Edinburgh Edition.

==== Original material and alterations ====
In Volume II material not previously published in a collection of the poet's works were printed. A number had been in print elsewhere as noted for Tam O'Shanter. Other works that were previously published are Written in Friar's Carse Hermitage in The Weekly Miscellany, Glasgow, 30 November 1791; Ode to the memory of Mrs Oswald of Auchencruive in Stuart's Star, London, 7 May 1789 and elsewhere; Elegy on Capt. Matthew Henderson in The Edinburgh Magazine XII, August 1790; Lament for James Earl of Glencairn in The Gazeteer and New Daily Advertiser, London, 30 September 1790; On Capt. Grose's Peregrinations in The Edinburgh Evening Courant, 11 August 1789 and elsewhere; Song in Stuart's Star, London, 18 April 1789; Humble Petition of Bruar Water in The Edinburgh Magazine, X, November 1789; Written at the Inn at Taymouth in The Edinburgh Courant, 6 September 1787; The Whistle published in a pamphlet in 1791.

Burns had discussed changes to "On seeing a seeing a fellow wound a hare with a shot" with his friend Alexander Cunningham and from 1793 onwards he removed the penultimate stanza:

"Perhaps a mother's anguish adds its woe,
The playful pair croud fondly by thy side;
Ah, helpless nurslings! Who will now provide
That life a mother only can bestow."

=== The publishers ===
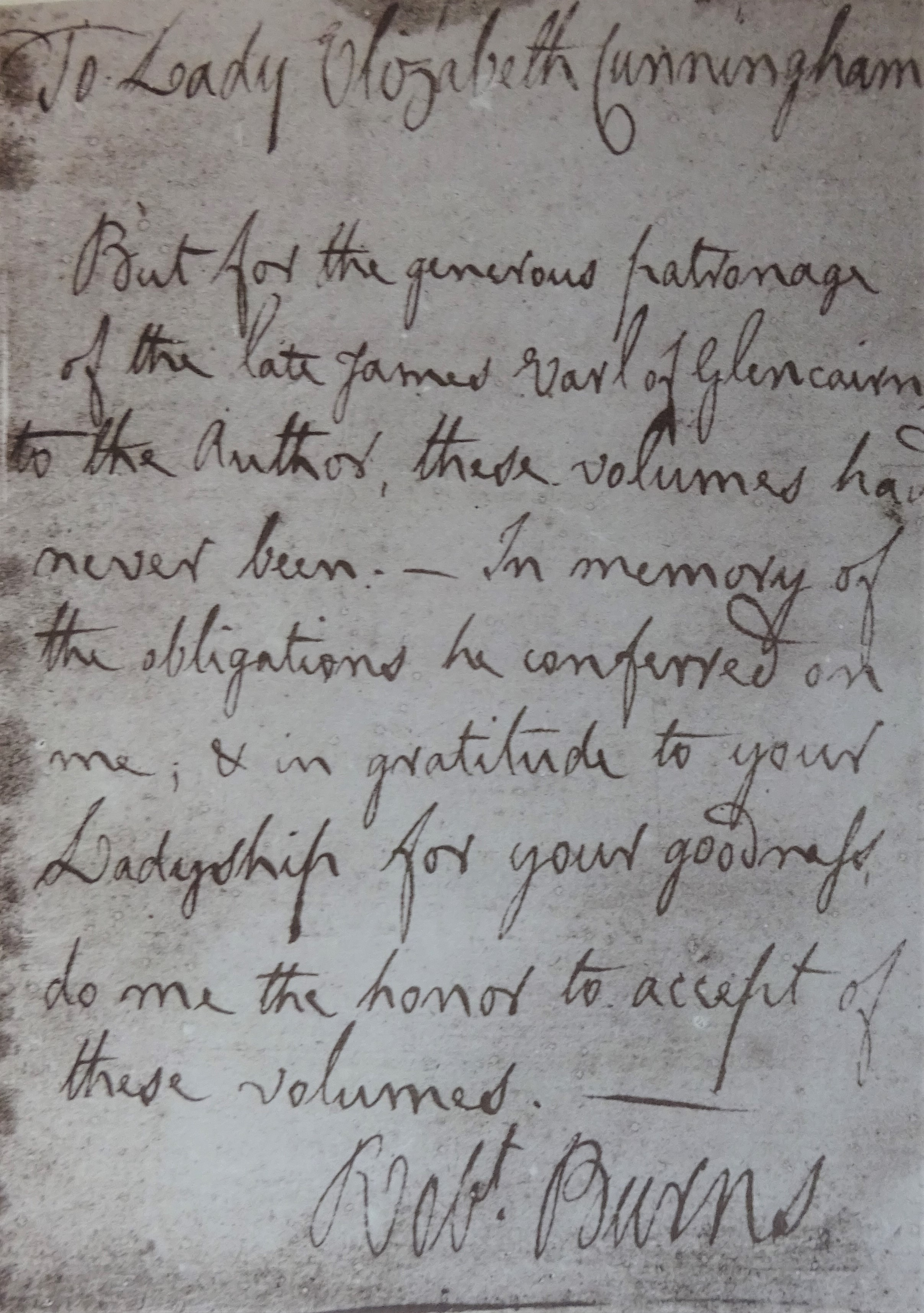
Burns's letter to Lady Elizabeth Cunningham presenting her with a set of his 1793 publication.

T. Cadell, London, and W. Creech, Edinburgh were the publishers of the 1793 and 1794 Edinburgh Editions. Two weeks after the 1793 volumes were advertised for sale Burns wrote to William Creech:

"I understand that my Book is published. I beg that you will, as soon as possible (italics), send me twenty copies of it. As I mean to present them among a few Great Folks whom I respect, & a few Little Folks whom I love, these twenty will not interfere with your sale. If you have not twenty ready, send me any number you can. It will confer a particular obligation to let me have them by first Carrier."

Egerer comments:

"These letters show what sort of relationship existed between Burns and Creech at this period. The parsimonius publisher had been very slow about giving Burns any money for the first edition, and had not offered him anything for second: but in answer to Creech's query about how much he might want, Burns asked only for a few books and a few copies of the new edition. And when the edition has finally been published, Creech does not even inform Burns of it, Burns writes that he understands (italics) his book is published, and begs (italics) the publisher for some more copies!"

== The Portrait of Robert Burns ==
William Creech had commissioned Alexander Nasmyth to paint Burns' portrait from which John Beugo engraved the copper plate required for the printing process. Nasmyth was a landscape painter and was reluctant to take on the work, however he met with Burns and they became friends resulting in Nasmyth producing a portrait. He never fully completed this however due to his concern over spoiling what he had already achieved. John Beugo the engraver arranged several sittings with Burns and produced a better likeness as confirmed by Gilbert Burns. Nasmyth refused payment from Creech and gave the painting to Jean Armour.

== Presentation Copies ==
Burns and his family became firm friends in Dumfries with Thomas White and he presented Thomas with a copy of his 1793 Edinburgh Edition, writing in the volume "Mr. White will accept of this book as a mark of the most sincere Friendship, from a man who has ever had too much respect for his friends, & too much contempt for his enemies, to flatter either the one or the other - The Author." He sent a copy to 'Dear Bought Bess' at Mossgiel Farm, inscribed on the fly-leaf 'her father's gift - THE AUTHOR'. In a copy sent to John McMurdo he remarked in a note that "However inferiour now, or afterwards, I may rank as a Poet; one honest virtue, to which few Poets can pretend, I trust I shall ever claim as mine: - to no man, whatever his station in life, or his power to serve me, have 1 ever paid a compliment at the expence of TRUTH."

He also sent copies to Thomas Sloan, Nancy McLehose, Patrick Miller, Mrs Graham of Fintry, Robert Riddell, David Blair, Maria Riddell, John Francis Erskine, John Cunningam, 15th Earl of Glencairn and his sister Lady Elizabeth. David Blair, the Birmingham Gunsmith, in 1788 had presented Burns with a splendid pair of pistols. In 1793 Burns sent Blair a copy of the Second Edinburgh Edition of his poems.

== The poems and songs of the 1793 Robert Burns Edinburgh Edition ==
=== Volume I Contents ===
1. The Twa Dogs. A Tale
2. Scotch Drink
3. The Author's Earnest Cry and Prayer to the Scotch Representatives in the House of Commons
4. The Holy Fair
5. Death and Doctor Hornbook
6. The Brigs of Ayr
7. The Ordination
8. The Calf
9. Address to the Deil
10. The Death and Dying Words of Poor Mailie
11. Poor Maillie's Elegy
12. To J. S**** (James Smith)
13. A Dream
14. The Vision
15. Address to the Unco Guid, or the Rigidly Righteous
16. Tam Samson's Elegy
17. Halloween
18. The Auld Farmer's New-Year Morning's Salutation to his Auld Mare, Maggie
19. To A Mouse
20. A Winter Night
21. Epistle to Davie, a Brother Poet
22. The Lament
23. Despondency. An Ode.
24. Winter. A Dirge

=== Volume II Contents ===
1. The Cotter's Saturday Night
2. Man was made to Mourn. An Elegy
3. A Prayer, in the Prospect of Death
4. Stanzas on the same occasion
5. Verses left at a Friend's House
6. The First Psalm
7. A Prayer
8. The First Six Verses of the Ninetieth Psalm
9. To a Mountain Daisy
10. To Ruin
11. To Miss L____, with Beattie's Poems for a New-year's Gift (Logan)
12. Epistle to a Young Friend
13. On a Scotch Bard gone to the West Indies
14. To a Haggis
15. A Dedication to G**** H******* Esq; (Gavin Hamilton)
16. To a Louse, on seeing one on a Lady's Bonnet at Church
17. Address to Edinburgh
18. Epistle to J. L*****, an old Scotch Bard (John Lapraik)
19. To the same
20. Epistle to W. S*****, Ochiltree (William Simpson)
21. Epistle to J. R******, inclosing some Poems (John Rankine)
22. John Barleycorn. A Ballad
23. A Fragment,'When Guilford good our Pilot stood,'
24. Song, 'It was upon a Lammas night'
25. Song, 'Now westlin winds and slaughtering guns'
26. Song, 'Behind you hills where Stinchar flows' **
27. Green grow the Rashes. A Fragment
28. Song, 'Again rejoicing Nature sees'
29. Song, 'The gloomy Night is gath'ring fast'
30. Song, 'From thee, Eliza, I must go'
31. The Farewell. To the Brethren of St James's Lodge, Tarbolton
32. Song, 'No churchman am I for to rail and to write'
33. Written in Friar's Carse Hermitage p. 160 *
34. Ode to the memory of Mrs ___ of ____ (Mrs Oswald of Auchencruive) p. 164 *
35. Elegy on Capt. M ____ H _____ (Matthew Henderson) p. 168 *
36. Lament of Mary Queen of Scots p. 177 *
37. To R*** G*** of F***, Esq. (Robert Graham of Fintry) p. 181*
38. Lament for James Earl of Glencairn p. 188 *
39. Lines sent to Sir John Whiteford with the foregoing p. 194 *
40. Tam O'Shanter. A Tale p. 195 *
41. On seeing a wounded hare a fellow had shot p. 209 *
42. Address to the shade of Thomson
43. Epitaph on a celebrated Ruling Elder
44. _______ on a noisy Polemic
45. _______ on Wee Johnie
46. _______ For the Author's Father
47. _______ for R. A. Esq. (Robert Aitken)
48. _______ for G. H. Esq. (Gavin Hamilton)
49. A Bard's Epitaph
50. On Capt. Grose's Peregrinations p. 219 *
51. On Miss C**** (Jane Cruickshank) p. 224 *
52. Song p. 226 *
53. On the death of J____ M'L____ (John McLeod) p. 227 *
54. Humble Petition of Bruar Water p. 229 *
55. On scaring some Water-fowl p. 235 *
56. Written in the Inn at Taymouth p. 238 *
57. ______ at the Fall of Fyers p. 241 *
58. On the Birth of a Posthumous Child p. 243 *
59. The Whistle p. 245 *
60. The Glossary
- A poem or song first printed in book form in the Edinburgh Edition of 1793. Pagination is given for the new material.

( ) – The missing name from the poem or song.

  - Printed here in error as you rather than yon. The 1794 edition has been corrected.

Burns as illustrated above used a variety of methods to keep the names of individuals hidden to some extent, such as with a series of asterisks denoting missing letters, sometimes with an asterisk per letter. A solid line giving no clue at all to the number of letters or initials, as understandably with the Mrs Oswald of Auchencruive poem.

== The 1794 Edinburgh Edition ==
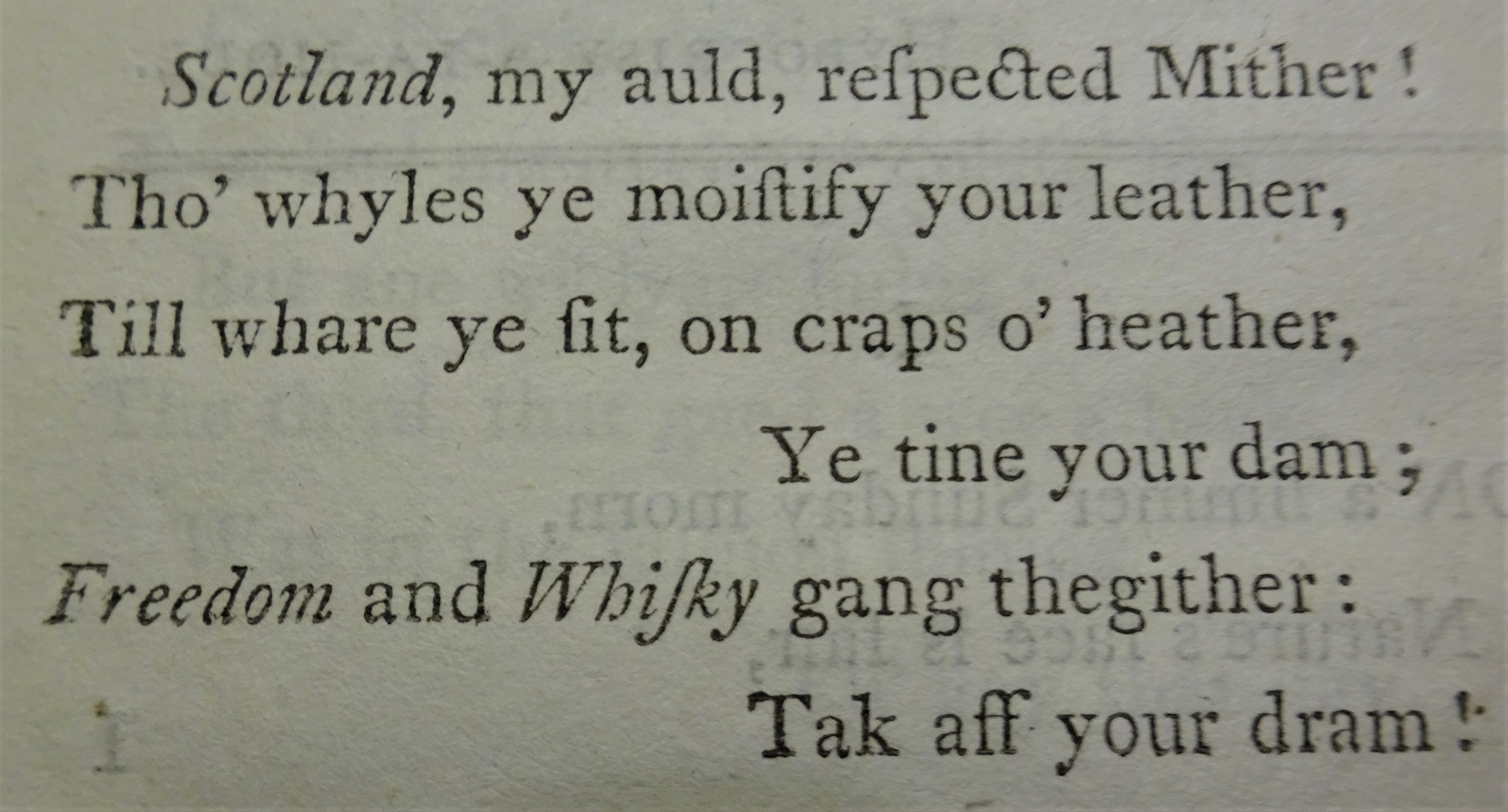
The final verse of 'Earnest Cry and Prayer' - 1794 Version

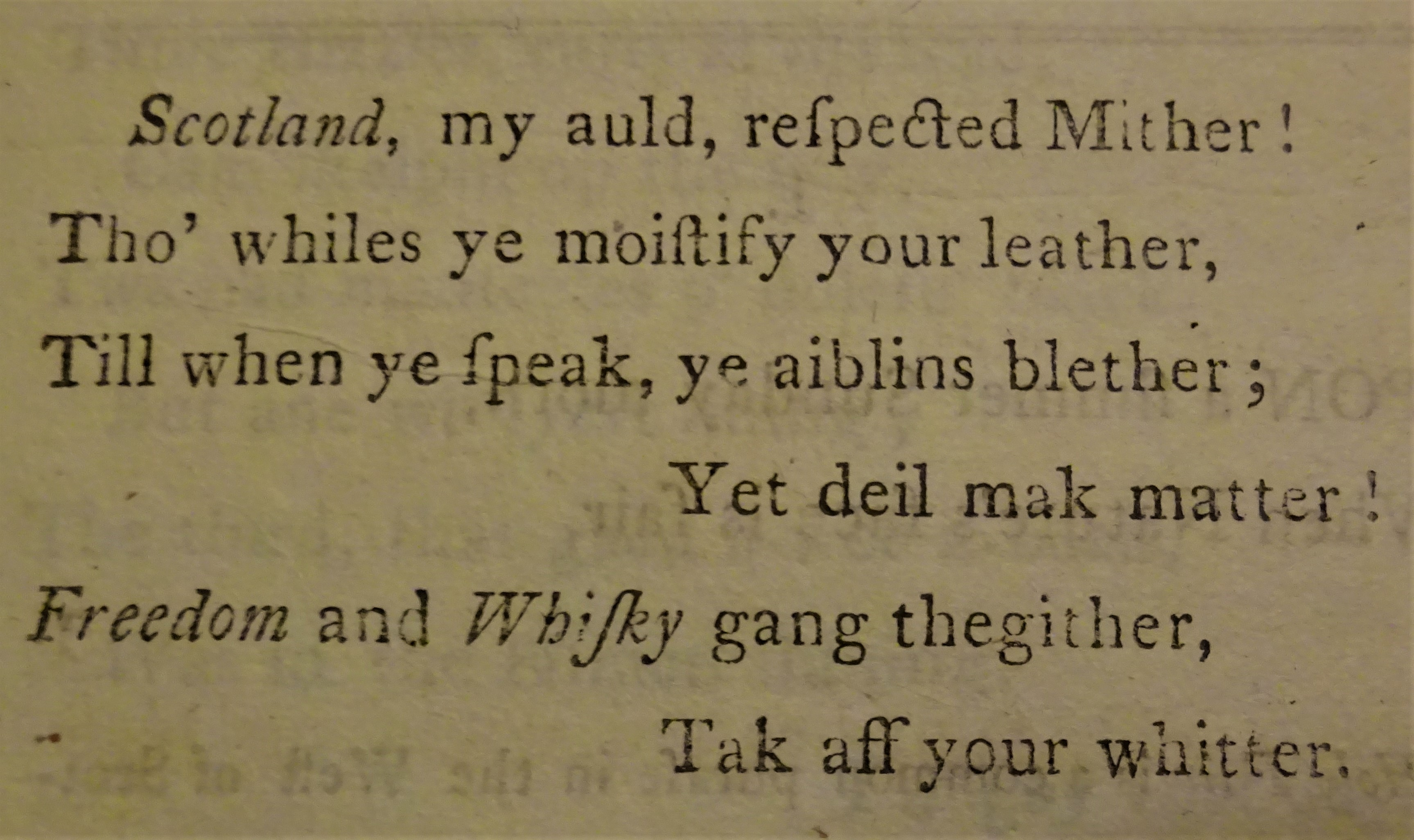
The final verse of 'Earnest Cry and Prayer' - 1793 and earlier veresion.

A reprint, issued in boards, was issued in 1794 with many of the same additional errors as the 1793 volumes. The 1793 and 1794 differ in appearance in some respects, such as the positioning of text and on page XI of the 1793 volume I the details of an error rout for tour is given, absent from the 1794 edition. In the 1794 edition the Song (Anna, thy charms my bosom fire,) has been left out from the contents list for Volume II, page 226.

The title page of the 1793 edition has the information In Two Volumes. The Second Edition Considerably Enlarged whilst the 1794 edition title has In Two Volumes. A New Edition, Considerably Enlarged. The weight of paper was different with the thickness of paper greater in the 1793 edition. The half-title in the 1793 reads POEMS, chiefly Scottish whilst in the 1794 edition the half-title reads POEMS chiefly in the Scottish Dialect.

On 3 August 1795 Burns presented Jean Lorimer with a copy of the last edition of his works published during his lifetime: "inscription, written on the blank leaf of a copy of the last edition of my poems, presented to the lady whom, in so many fictitious reveries of passion, but with the most ardent sentiments of real friendship, I have so often sung under the name of 'Chloris.'" The poem then followed : "Tis friendship's pledge, my young fair friend."

Lt-Col. Cunningham, son of Alan Cunningham, Burns's biographer, pointed out that the last four lines of the final verse of 'Earnest Cry and Prayer' differ in the 1794 Edinburgh Edition from all previous editions. The alteration did not prove popular with the public and has not appeared since.

== Subsequent editions ==
Amongst later 18th century editions of Poems, Chiefly in the Scottish Dialect are those published in Belfast (1793), Edinburgh (1797 & 1798), Philadelphia (1798) and New York (1799), often without the author's knowledge or with the permission of William Creech, the copyright holder, as it was not a legal requirement at the time. A Dublin edition was not printed. The Belfast edition by William Magee, who had published the 1787 Edinburgh Edition, was an oddity with Volume I having the glossary and Volume II the new material as he appears to have received Burns's 1793 edition after he had already type set his intended one volume publication. Volume II had to be expanded with other of the poet's works.

In the 19th century Thomas Stewart's 1802 edition is notorious for having included a section with twenty-five letters written by Sylvander Robert Burns to Clarinda Agnes Maclehose without the permission of Agnes Maclehose, the copyright holder.

The copyright for the 1787 Edinburgh Edition expired in 1801.

== See also ==
- A Manual of Religious Belief
- Poems, Chiefly in the Scottish Dialect (Edinburgh Edition)
- Poems, Chiefly in the Scottish Dialect (London Edition)
- Poems, Chiefly in the Scottish Dialect (Dublin Variant)
- Robert Burns's Interleaved Scots Musical Museum
- Robert Burns World Federation
- Burns Clubs
- Irvine Burns Club
- Poems by David Sillar
