= Burns stanza =

The Burns stanza is a verse form named after the Scottish poet Robert Burns, who used it in some fifty poems. It was not, however, invented by Burns, and prior to his use of it was known as the standard Habbie, after the piper Habbie Simpson (1550–1620). It is also sometimes known as the Scottish stanza or six-line stave. It is found in Middle English in the Romance of Octovian (Octavian). It was also found in medieval Provençal poems and miracle plays from the Middle Ages.

The first notable poem written in this stanza was the "Lament for Habbie Simpson; or, the Life and Death of the Piper of Kilbarchan" by Robert Sempill the younger. The stanza was used frequently by major 18th-century Lowland Scots poets such as Robert Fergusson and Robert Burns and has been used by subsequent poets. Major poems in the stanza include Burns's "To a Mouse", "To a Louse", "Address to the Deil" and "Death and Doctor Hornbook". The stanza is six lines in length and rhymes $\mathrm{AAABAB}$, with tetrameter $\mathrm{A}$ lines and dimeter $\mathrm{B}$ lines. The second $\mathrm{B}$ line may or may not be repeated.

Although the "Lament for Habbie" itself is strictly lyrical, subsequent uses have tended to be comic and satirical, as this passage from Burns shows:

O THOU! whatever title suit thee—
Auld Hornie, Satan, Nick, or Clootie,
Wha in yon cavern grim an' sootie,
Clos'd under hatches,
Spairges about the brunstane cootie,
To scaud poor wretches!

Hear me, auld Hangie, for a wee,
An' let poor damned bodies be;
I’m sure sma' pleasure it can gie,
Ev'n to a deil,
To skelp an' scaud poor dogs like me,
An' hear us squeel!

— "Address to the Deil"

A variation on the Burns stanza employs the rhyme scheme $\mathrm{AABCCCB}$, with foreshortened third and seventh lines. This form is deployed, for example, in W. H. Auden's poem "Brother, who when the sirens roar" (also known as "A Communist to Others"):

Brothers, who when the sirens roar
From office, shop and factory pour
'Neath evening sky;
By cops directed to the fug
Of talkie-houses for a drug,
Or down canals to find a hug
Until you die: (lines 1–7)

Auden uses similar verse forms in other poems in the collection Look, Stranger! (also known as On This Island), such as "The Witnesses" and "Out on the Lawn I Lie in Bed" (also known as "Summer Night"). A more recent example can be seen in W. N. Herbert's "To a Mousse". The $\mathrm{AABCCCB}$ variation is also employed by Samuel Francis Smith in the lyrics of his song "America":

My country, 'tis of thee,
Sweet land of liberty,
Of thee I sing;
Land where my fathers died,
Land of the pilgrims' pride,
From ev'ry mountainside
Let freedom ring! (lines 1–7)
