= Poems, Chiefly in the Scottish Dialect =

1786 poetry collection by Robert Burns

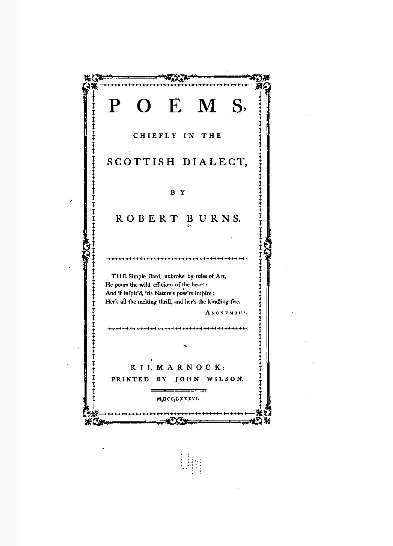
- First edition title-page, 1786.
- Author: Robert Burns
- Original title: Kilmarnock Edition
- Language: Scots
- Genre: Poetry and Lyrics
- Publisher: John Wilson of Kilmarnock
- Publication date: 1786
- Publication place: Scotland

Poems, Chiefly in the Scottish Dialect, commonly known as the Kilmarnock Edition, is a collection of poetry by the Scottish poet Robert Burns, first printed and issued by John Wilson of Kilmarnock on 31 July 1786. It was the first published edition of Burns' work. In mid-April 1786, Burns sent out printed Proposals for what was then titled Scotch Poems asking for people to sign up as subscribers, printing began on 13 June, and the first copies were ready for distribution by 31 July. 612 copies were printed. The book cost three shillings, in a temporary paper binding that most purchasers soon had replaced. There is no formal dedication at the start of the book, but Burns includes a dedication poem to Gavin Hamilton at pp. 185–191, and "The Cotter's Saturday Night" is "inscribed to R.A. Esq.," i.e. Robert Aitken.

Besides satire, the Kilmarnock volume contains a number of poems such as "Halloween" (written in 1785), "The Twa Dogs" and "The Cotter's Saturday Night", which are vividly descriptive of the Scots peasant life with which Burns was most familiar; and a group such as "Puir Mailie" and "To a Mouse", which, in the tenderness of their treatment of animals, revealed one of the most attractive sides of Burns' personality. In addition to the poems listed below under Contents, the book begins with a four-page preface in which Burns claims he lacks the benefits of "learned art," that none of his poems were written "with a view to the press," and that he "wrote a mid the toils and fatigues of a laborious life." It concludes with a five-page glossary (pp. 236–240), focusing on Scottish words current in Burns's Ayrshire that might not be understood elsewhere in Scotland. Burns Other manuscripts are extant for many of the poems, but for six poems the manuscripts Burns gave to Wilson that Wilson used for the printer's copy are in the possession of the Irvine Burns Club.

== Surviving Copies ==
Of the 612 copies that Wilson printed, 84 are now known to survive. Five still have their original paper binding ("wrappers"); others still have the early replacement bindings, typically plain leather with a title label on the spine. At the end of the 19th century and early in the 20th, many copies were in poor condition, and collectors and book-dealers often had them put in new bindings, usually fine bindings of full leather with elaborate gilt tooling. A few of the surviving copies have manuscript annotations where Burns has filled in names he had left blank in the printed text.

== The first reprinting: the Edinburgh Edition ==
In 1787, Burns travelled to Edinburgh with the intention of organizing a second edition. He was introduced to publisher William Creech and printer William Smellie, and agreed with them that the new edition should include many additional poems and commission the famous frontispiece portrait, engraved by John Beugo from a painting by Alexander Nasmyth. Poems, Chiefly in the Scottish Dialect (Edinburgh Edition) was published in April 1787. It contains an elaborate dedication to the Caledonian Hunt, an aristocratic society which had subscribed for 100 copies, in which Burns announces that he aims to be a National [i.e. Scottish] Bard, not just a regional one. There was still a glossary, but it too was much expanded from that in the first edition, now explaining Scottish words for readers who did not themselves speak Scots. The new expanded edition cost 5 shillings, bound in paper-covered boards. The original print-run was for 2,000 copies, but pre-orders were heavy, including copies for a London bookseller Strahan, and the print-run was increased to 3,250 copies, necessitating reprinting some of the earlier sections. Later that year, Strahan would be the primary publisher of the first London edition, with the same title, though that was still printed by Smellie in Edinburgh.

== Facsimiles ==
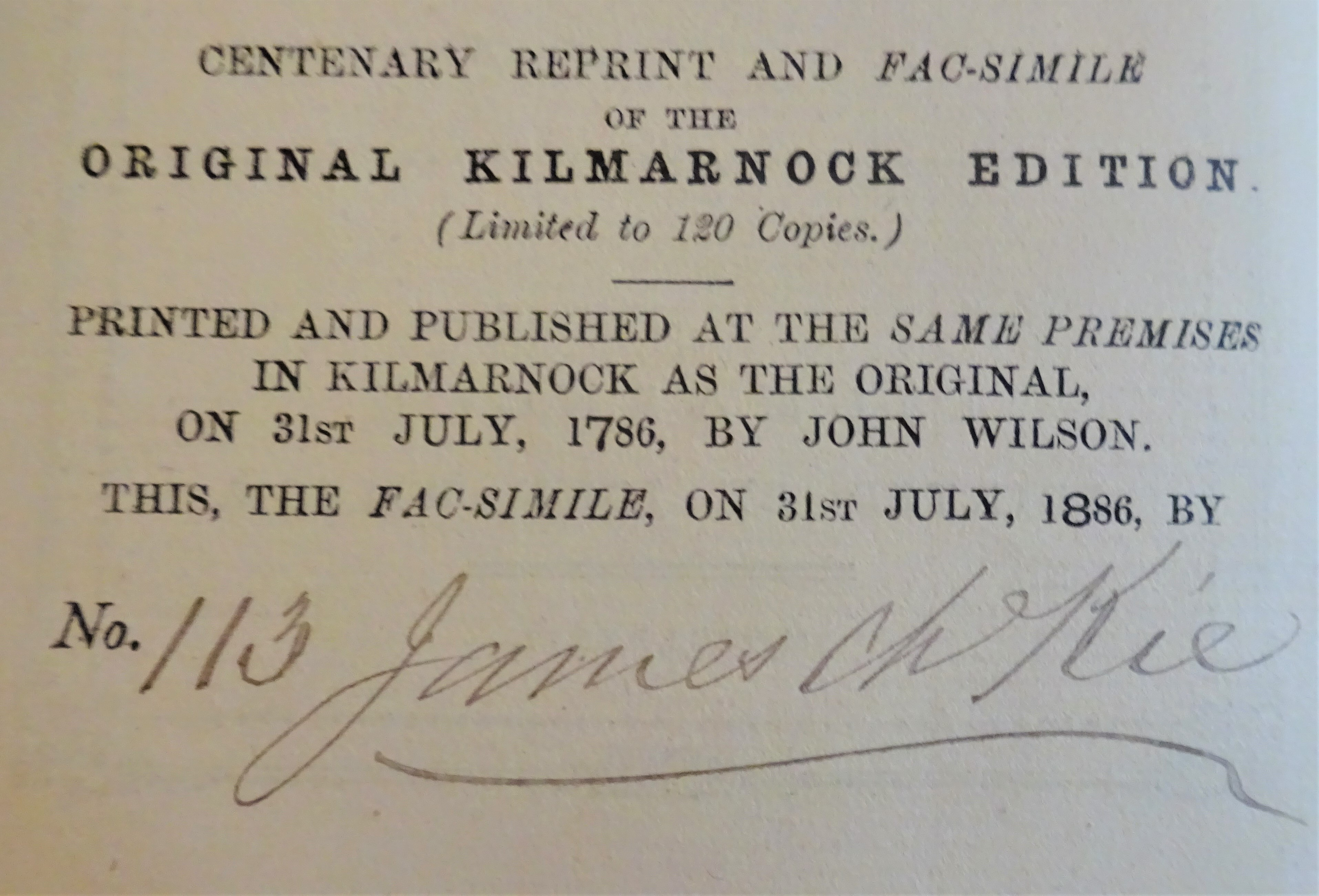
Centenary Facsimile with Jamies McKie's signature in a limited edition of 120 copies.

Only 612 copies of the Poems, Chiefly in the Scottish Dialect were printed by John Wilson in 1786 and the publisher James McKie saw that most collectors of Robert Burns's works would be unable to acquire a copy and to satisfy this demand and satisfy his own interests as an admirer of Burns he produced the first facsimile edition for collectors in 1867 in a print run of 600 copies. Each copy was signed by James McKie, and, unlike most later facsimiles, these were bound in blue-gray paper covered boards with a buff paper spine, mistakenly imitating the binding of the Edinburgh edition rather than the wrappers of the Kilmarnock. A miniature facsimile issued in a protective case with a magnifying glass in the 1890s and was of benefit to troops in the trenches in World War I due to its protective case and convenient size.

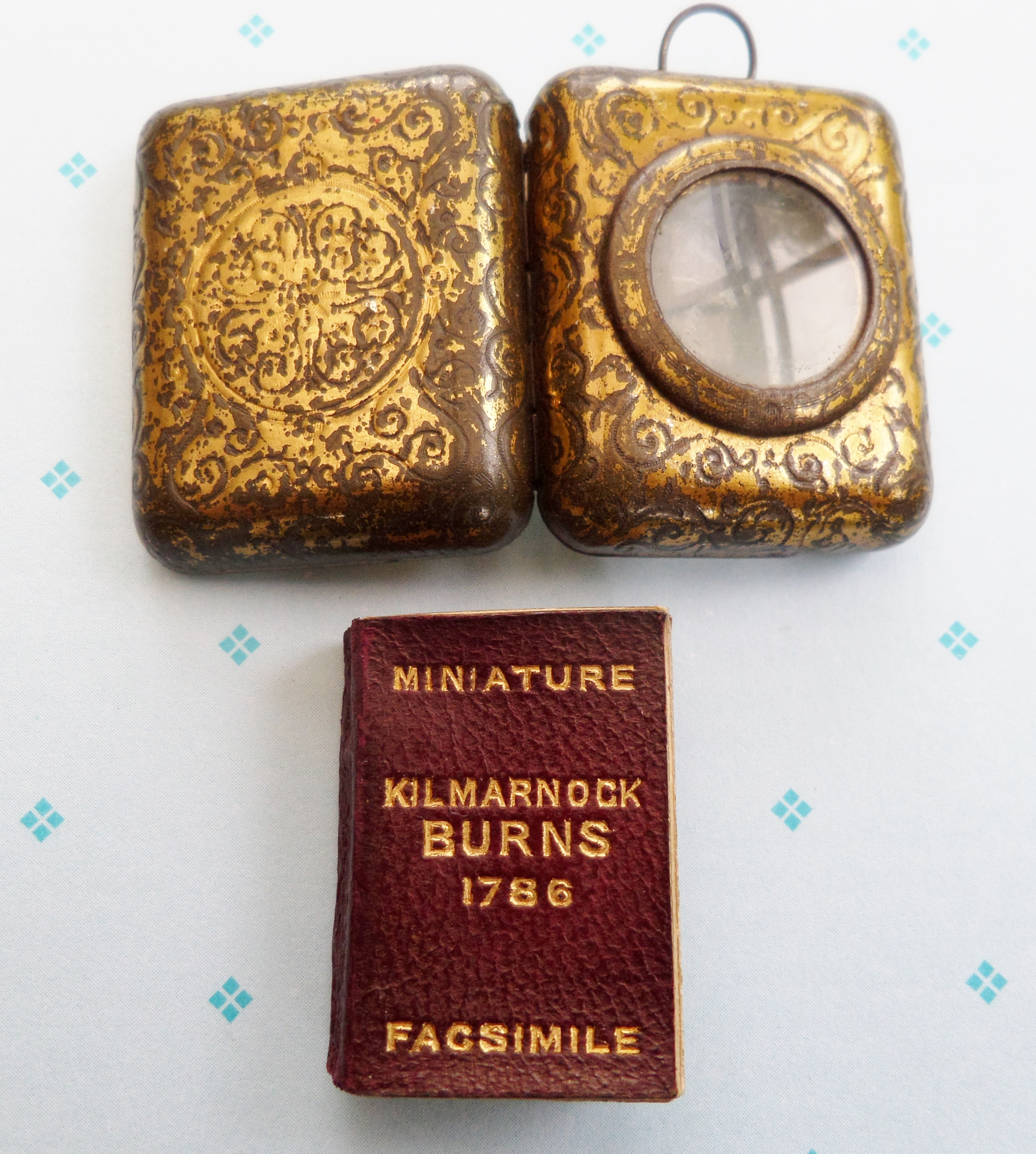
The miniature facsimile edition of Robert Burns 1786 volume of poems.

== Contents ==
1. The Twa Dogs, a Tale
2. Scotch Drink
3. The Author's earnest cry and prayer, to the right honorable and honorable, the Scotch representatives in the House of Commons
4. The Holy Fair
5. Address to the Deil
6. The death and dying words of Poor Maillie
7. Poor Mallie's Elegy
8. To J. S****
9. A Dream
10. The Vision
11. Halloween
12. The auld Farmer's new-year-morning Salutation, to his auld Mare, Maggy, on giving her the accustomed ripp of Corn to hansel in the new year
13. The Cotter's Saturday Night, inscribed to R. A. Esq
14. To a Mouse, on turning her up in her Nest, with the Plough, November, 1785
15. Epistle to Davie, a brother Poet
16. The Lament, occasioned by the unfortunate issue of a friend's amour
17. Despondency, an Ode
18. Man was made to mourn, a Dirge
19. Winter, a Dirge
20. A Prayer in the prospect of Death
21. To a Mountain-Daisy, on turning one down, with the Plough, in April, 1786
22. To Ruin
23. Epistle to a young Friend
24. On a Scotch Bard gone to the West Indies
25. A Dedication to G. H. Esq
26. To a Louse, on seeing one on a Lady's bonnet at Church
27. Epistle to J. L*****k, an old Scotch Bard
28. Epistle to the same
29. Epistle to W. S*****n, Ochiltree
30. Epistle to J. R******, enclosing some Poems
31. Song, It was upon a Lammas night
32. Song, Now westlin winds, and flaught'ring guns
33. Song, From thee, Eliza, I must go
34. The Farewell
35. Epitaphs and Epigrams
36. A Bard's Epitaph

== See also ==
- Address to the Deil
- To a Mountain Daisy
- Epitaph for James Smith
- Poems, Chiefly in the Scottish Dialect (Edinburgh Edition)
- Poems, Chiefly in the Scottish Dialect (Second Edinburgh Edition)
- Poems, Chiefly in the Scottish Dialect (London Edition)
- Poems, Chiefly in the Scottish Dialect (Dublin Variant)
- Robert Burns World Federation
- Burns Clubs
- Poems by David Sillar
- Glenriddell Manuscripts
