= Epitaph for James Smith =

1785 satirical Scots epitaph by Robert Burns

"Epitaph for James Smith" is a satirical Scots epitaph written by poet Robert Burns in 1785, and was included in his first publication, the Kilmarnock volume:

LAMENT him, Mauchline husbands a’,
He aften did assist ye;
For had ye staid hale weeks awa,
Your wives they ne’er had miss’d ye.

Ye Mauchline bairns, as on ye press,
To school in bands thegither,
O tread ye lightly on his grass,—
Perhaps he was your father!

== See also ==
- Epistle to James Smith
- The Scottish town of Mauchline
