= To a Mountain Daisy =

Poem by Robert Burns

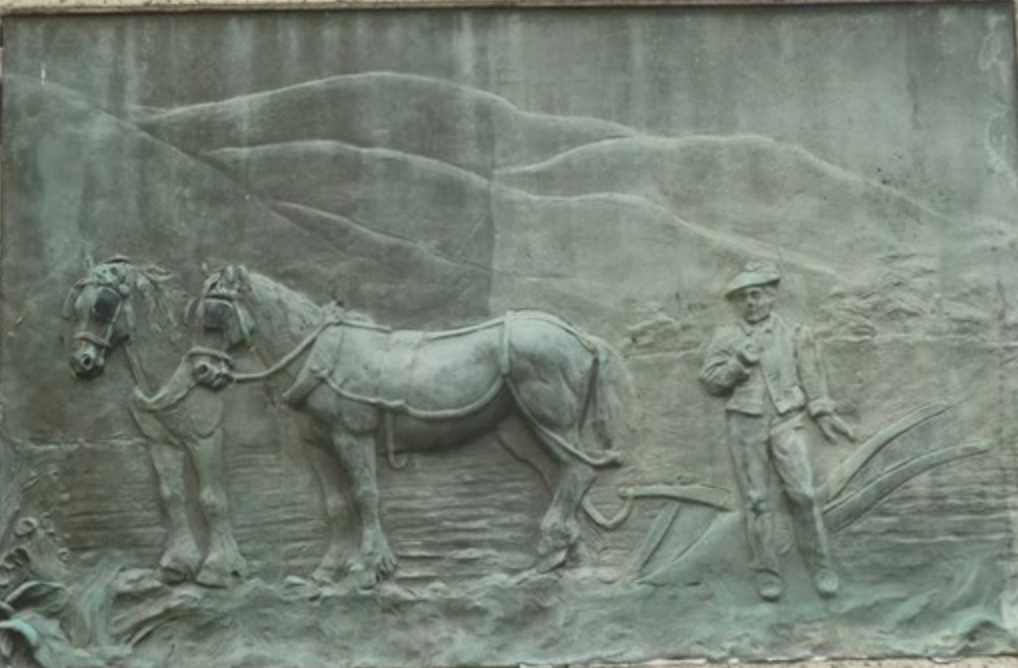
To a Mountain Daisy, Robbie Burns Statue, Victoria Park, Halifax, Nova Scotia

"To a Mountain Daisy", On Turning one Down, With The Plough, in April 1786 is a Scots poem written by Robert Burns in 1786. It was included in the Kilmarnock volume of Burns's poems, published in that year.

The poem tells of how the poet, while out with the plough, discovers that he has crushed a daisy's stem. It is similar in some respects to his poem To a Mouse, published in the previous year. In ploughing a field in the early morning, there must have been hundreds of small flowers that were turned down by the plough and why Burns was taken with this particular specimen is a mystery.

In a similar way from To a Mouse, Burns compares the daisy's fate to that of humankind, first, in stanza six, to a young girl taken in by her lover and then, in stanza seven, to himself. The final stanza is in some ways reminiscent of Andrew Marvell's poem To His Coy Mistress:

But at my back I always hear
Time's wingèd chariot drawing near;
