= Address to the Devil =

1785 poem by Robert Burns

"Address to the Devil" is a poem by Scottish poet Robert Burns. It was written in Mossgiel in 1785 and published in the Kilmarnock volume in 1786. The poem was written as a humorous portrayal of the Devil and the pulpit oratory of the Presbyterian Church.

== Content ==
It begins by quoting from Milton's Paradise Lost as a contrast with the first two lines of the poem itself:

O thou! Whatever title suit thee,
Auld Hornie, Satan, Nick or Clootie

These lines are also a parody of a couplet in Alexander Pope's satire The Dunciad.

The poem was written in a Habbie stanza with the stanza six lines long and the rhyme scheme AAABAB. Burns used a similar stanza in Death and Doctor Hornbook.

The poem is also skeptical of the Devil's existence and of his intentions to punish sinners for all eternity as in the stanza.

Hear me, auld Hangie, for a wee,
An’ let poor damned bodies be;
I’m sure sma’ pleasure it can gie,

Ev’n to a deil,

To skelp an’ scaud poor dogs like me,

An’ hear us squeel!

This contrasts with the views contained in works such as Paradise Lost and the preachings of the Church.

== See also ==
- The Holy Tulzie
