= To a Louse =

1786 Scots-language poem by Robert Burns

"To A Louse, On Seeing One on a Lady's Bonnet at Church" is a 1786 Scots language poem by Robert Burns in his favourite meter, standard Habbie. The poem's theme is contained in the final verse:

Burns original

O wad some Pow'r the giftie gie us
To see oursels as ithers see us!
It wad frae mony a blunder free us,
An' foolish notion:
What airs in dress an' gait wad lea'e us,
An' ev'n devotion!

Translation:

Standard English translation

Oh, would some Power the gift give us
To see ourselves as others see us!
It would from many a blunder free us,
And foolish notion:
What airs in dress and gait would leave us,
And even devotion!

In the eight-stanza satirical poem, the speaker draws the reader's attention to a lady in church with a louse that is roving, unnoticed by her, around in her bonnet. In the course of the poem, the speaker addresses the louse as it scurries about on "Jenny" who cluelessly tosses her hair and preens, not knowing the person seeing her sees a louse on her. In this last stanza, the speaker reflects on what a gift it would be for us to be able to see ourselves as others see us. How we walk and how we put on airs all would vanish. Not only that, even devotion (i.e., romance) would vanish.

== See also ==
- To a Mouse
