= To a Mouse =

1785 Scots-language poem by Robert Burns

- by Robert Burns
- Country: Scotland
- Language: Scots
- Rhyme scheme: AAABAB
- Publication date: November, 1785

"To a Mouse, on Turning Her Up in Her Nest With the Plough, November, 1785" is a Scots-language poem written by Robert Burns in 1785. It was included in the Kilmarnock Edition and all of the poet's later editions, such as the Edinburgh Edition. According to legend, Burns was ploughing in the fields at his Mossgiel Farm and accidentally destroyed a mouse's nest, which it needed to survive the winter. Burns's brother, Gilbert, claimed that the poet composed the poem while still holding his plough.

== The poem ==
Side by side comparison
The original Scots

Wee, sleekit, cow'rin, tim'rous beastie,
O, what a panic's in thy breastie!
Thou need na start awa sae hasty,
Wi' bickering brattle!
I wad be laith to rin an' chase thee,
Wi' murd'ring pattle!

I'm truly sorry man's dominion,
Has broken nature's social union,
An' justifies that ill opinion,
Which makes thee startle
At me, thy poor, earth-born companion,
An' fellow-mortal!

I doubt na, whiles, but thou may thieve;
What then? poor beastie, thou maun live!
A daimen icker in a thrave
'S a sma' request;
I'll get a blessin wi' the lave,
An' never miss't!

Thy wee bit housie, too, in ruin!
It's silly wa's the win's are strewin!
An' naething, now, to big a new ane,
O' foggage green!
An' bleak December's winds ensuin,
Baith snell an' keen!

Thou saw the fields laid bare an' waste,
An' weary winter comin fast,
An' cozie here, beneath the blast,
Thou thought to dwell—
Till crash! the cruel coulter past
Out thro' thy cell.

That wee bit heap o' leaves an' stibble,
Has cost thee mony a weary nibble!
Now thou's turn'd out, for a' thy trouble,
But house or hald,
To thole the winter's sleety dribble,
An' cranreuch cauld!

But, Mousie, thou art no thy lane,
In proving foresight may be vain;
The best-laid schemes o' mice an' men
Gang aft agley,
An' lea'e us nought but grief an' pain,
For promis'd joy!

Still thou art blest, compar'd wi' me
The present only toucheth thee:
But, Och! I backward cast my e'e.
On prospects drear!
An' forward, tho' I canna see,
I guess an' fear!

English translation

Little, sleek, cowering, timorous beast,
Oh, what a panic is in your breast!
You need not start away so hasty
With bickering prattle!
I would be loath to run and chase you,
With murdering ploughstaff!

I'm truly sorry man's dominion
Has broken Nature's social union,
And justifies that ill opinion
Which makes you startle
At me, your poor, earth-born companion
And fellow mortal!

I doubt not, sometimes, that you may thieve;
What then? Poor beast, you must live!
An odd ear in twenty-four sheaves
Is a small request;
I will get a blessing with what is left,
And never miss it.

Your small house, too, in ruin!
Its feeble walls the winds are scattering!
And nothing now, to build a new one,
Of coarse green foliage!
And bleak December's winds ensuing,
Both bitter and piercing!

You saw the fields laid bare and empty,
And weary winter coming fast,
And cozy here, beneath the blast,
You thought to dwell,
Till crash! The cruel coulter passed
Out through your cell.

That small heap of leaves and stubble,
Has cost you many a weary nibble!
Now you are turned out, for all your trouble,
Without house or holding,
To endure the winter's sleety dribble,
And hoar-frost cold!

But Mouse, you are not alone,
In proving foresight may be vain:
The best-laid schemes of mice and men
Go oft awry,
And leave us nothing but grief and pain,
For promised joy!

Still you are blessed, compared with me!
The present only touches you:
But oh! I backward cast my eye,
On prospects dreary!
And forward, though I cannot see,
I guess and fear!

== Structure ==
The poem consists of eight stanzas in Burns stanza form, so called because he used it frequently. Each stanza is six lines in length and rhymes$\mathrm{AAABAB}$, with iambic tetrameter $\mathrm{A}$ lines and iambic dimeter $\mathrm{B}$ lines, both with frequent hypercatalexis (an additional final unstressed syllable). Rhymes include masculine rhyme, feminine rhyme, and near rhyme.

== Themes and interpretation ==
The poem originates from the poet/speaker's act of destroying the mouse's nest with his plough, an immediate symbol of human agricultural dominion. The poem is a dramatization of ethical struggle; the speaker expresses profound sympathy for the "wee, sleekit, cow'rin, tim'rous beastie," yet is the very agent of its distress. This creates a split persona: the compassionate poet versus the destructive farmer. The poem's structure reflects this tension, with its affectionate Scots clashing with more formal, philosophical English in the lament over "Man's dominion" breaking "Nature's social union."

The speaker's offer of forgiveness for thieving and a "sma' request" of grain is, as critic Nigel Leask notes, an "empty gesture" given the barren November setting. This highlights the practical limits of compassion within an agricultural system where animals are often seen as vermin. The mouse, though addressed directly, cannot reply, making the poem a monologue that underscores the fundamental inequality in the relationship.

Burns uses the specific, observed plight of the mouse to meditate on universal themes. The mouse's "best laid schemes" are linked to those of "Mice an' Men," expanding the poem's concern to all creatures vulnerable to misfortune. Scholars also read the mouse's eviction as an allegory for the Highland clearances and the displacement of tenant farmers during the Scottish Agricultural Revolution, broadening its social critique.

The poem concludes with a poignant reversal. The speaker envies the mouse because "The present only toucheth thee." While human foresight ("prospects drear") allows for planning and compassion, it also brings anxiety and regret, a psychological burden the mouse is spared. The shared mortality ("fellow-mortal") that promised kinship ultimately leads to a profound cognitive separation.

== In other media ==
John Steinbeck took the title of his 1937 novel Of Mice and Men from a line contained in the penultimate stanza. The 1997 novel The Best Laid Plans by Sidney Sheldon also draws its title from this line, and so do the novel of the same name by Canadian author Terry Fallis and the film series based on it.

The first stanza of the poem is read by Ian Anderson in the beginning of the 2007 remaster of "One Brown Mouse" by Jethro Tull. Anderson adds the line "But a mouse is a mouse, for all that" at the end of the stanza, which is a reference to another of Burns's songs, "Is There for Honest Poverty", commonly known as "A Man's a Man for A' That".

Sharon Olds's poem "Sleekit Cowrin'" also references this poem.

In Douglas Adams's Hitchhikers Guide to the Galaxy series, mice are hyperintelligent pan-dimensional beings who are trying to find the Question to the Ultimate Answer of Life, the Universe, and Everything. When their plans fail they lament that "the best laid plans of mice" don't always work out.

The Monty Python sketch 'Word Association' references the first line of the poem, and replaces the simple word "We" with "Wee sleekit cowerin' timorous beastie".

In book 2, chapters 9, 11, and 13 of The Once and Future King by T. H. White, several allusions to the poem are made. The most notable is on p. 291, where a drawbridge man says to the fleeing Sirs Grummore and Palomides, "Wee sleekit, cow'ring timorous Beastie... Oh, what panic's in thy breastie!"

The first line of the poem is frequently used by P. G. Wodehouse in his Jeeves stories and novels. Typically, a woman who has broken off her engagement uses it to describe her former lover, who has been ejected due to his cowardice. An example from The Cat-Nappers, Chapter 16 (Orlo Porter speaking): "Potty little lovers' quarrel my left eyeball. She called me a lily-livered poltroon. And a sleekit timorous cowering beastie."

The poem was alluded to in Ben Rector's song Living My Best Life.

== See also ==
- To a Louse
