= Glenriddell Manuscripts =

1791 collection of poems and letters by Robert Burns

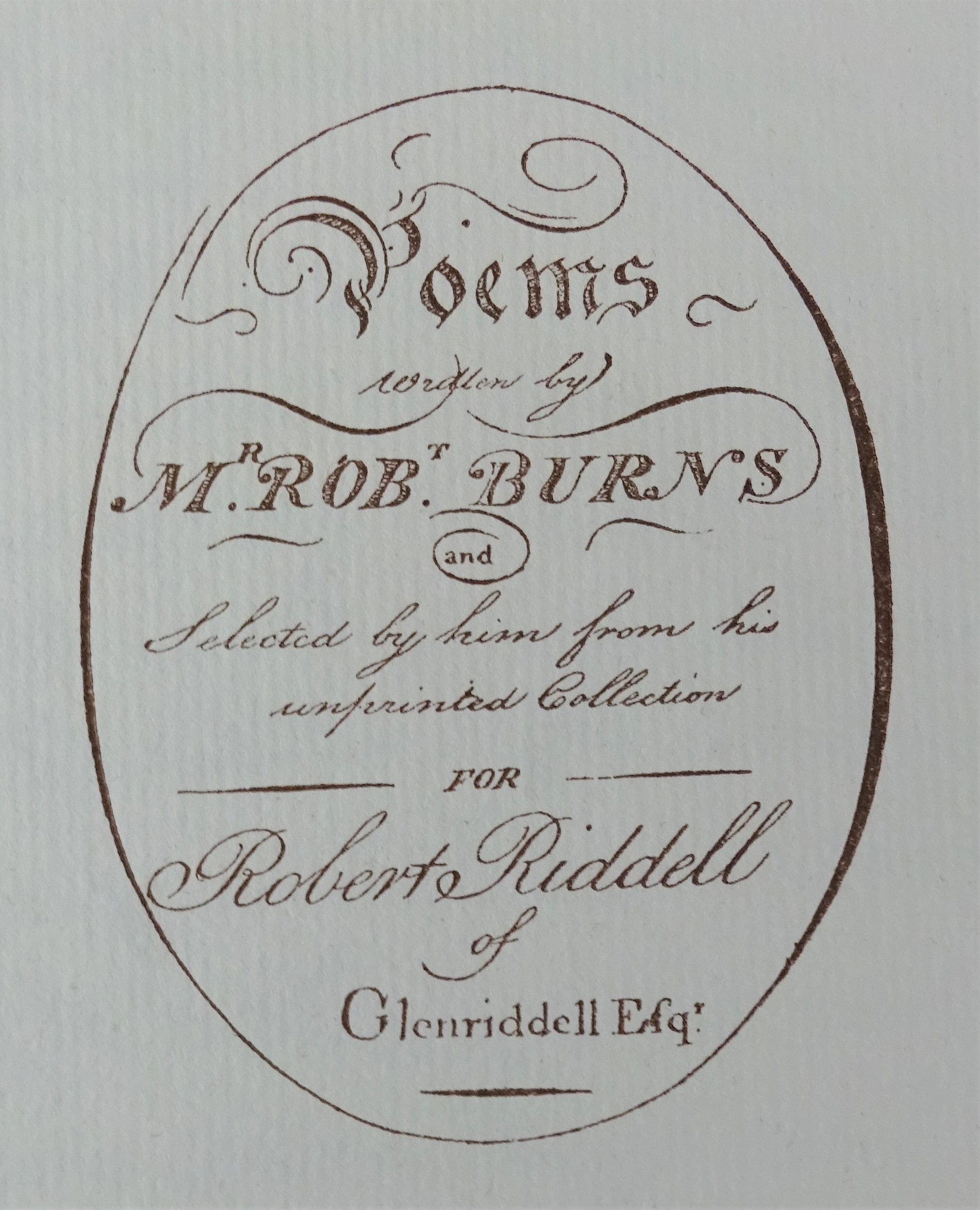
- Title page of the Glenriddell Manuscript. Volume 1
- Author: Robert Burns
- Language: Scots & English
- Genre: Poetry, Letters and Lyrics
- Publication place: Great Britain

The Glenriddell Manuscripts is an extensive collection written in holograph by Robert Burns and an amanuensis of his letters, poems and a few songs in two volumes produced for his then friend Captain Robert Riddell, Laird of what is now Friars Carse in the Nith Valley, Dumfries and Galloway. The two volumes of the manuscript were handsomely bound in calf leather. The first volume of poems and songs was completed by April 1791 and was presented to Robert Riddell, however their friendship ceased due to the unfortunate 'The Rape of the Sabine Women' incident and Robert Riddell died shortly after before any reconciliation could take place. The first volume is partly in Burns's hand with one main amanuensis contributing much of the text in a far neater hand than the author himself and a possible third person contributing to the text. The second volume is entirely in Burns's hand.

== History of the manuscripts ==
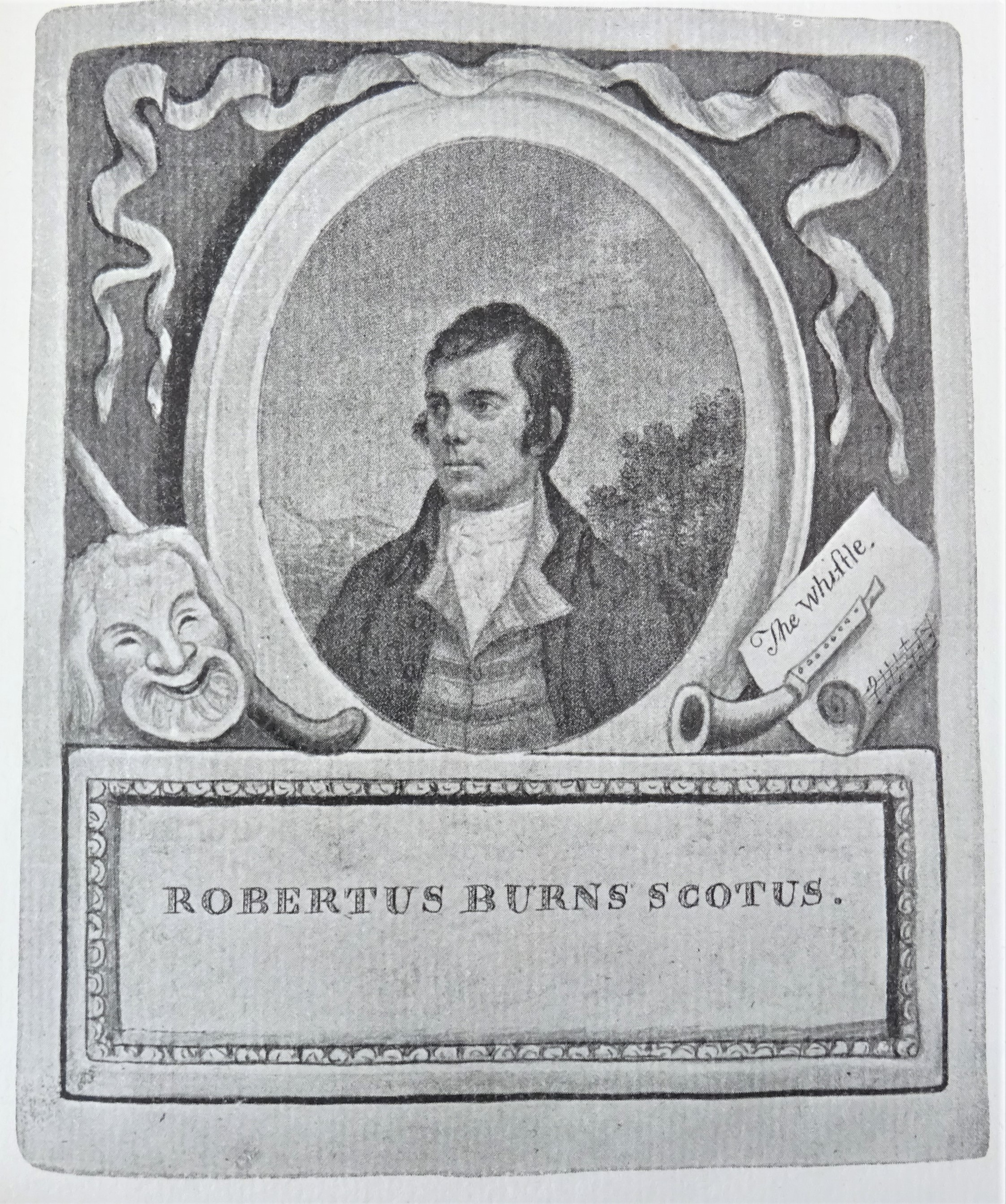
John Beugo engraving of Robert Burns.

Robert Riddell provided Burns with two attractive quarto sized volumes embossed with his armorial crest and bound in calf leather. They were slightly different sizes. Work started in May 1789 on adding the poems and songs. The 'stock and horn' of Burns's armorial bearing is placed on the frontispiece of the second volume.

Burns went to considerable efforts to get the first volume returned after Robert Riddell's death on 20 April 1794 and added extra material once it was back in his hands. The second volume had not been ready in time to be presented to Riddell. Burns wrote in 1794 to Robert Riddell's unmarried sister Eleanor, asking that she and her married sister Elizabeth would either return or destroy the manuscripts, saying that "I made a collection of all my trifles in verse which I had ever written. They are many of them local, some puerile and silly, and all of them unfit for the public eye. As I have some little fame at stake ... I am uneasy now for the fate of those manuscripts. ... As a pledge of friendship they were bestowed; and that circumstance, indeed, was all their merit." Burns was still working on the second volume in late 1793.

One of the additions he made to Volume One upon its return was the blunt and angry epigram upon Maria Riddell on page 161 "If you rattle along like your mistress's tongue."

After Burns's death the manuscripts were put into the hands of James Currie at Liverpool, his biographer, however they were not automatically returned to the Burns family after his biography of Burns was published and he died before he could publish an improved biography. After Currie's death they passed into the possession of his son William Wallace Currie. In 1853 when William died his widow, without permission, offered them to a private gentlemen's club known as the Liverpool Athenaeum where they resided, forgotten in a box for circa twenty years, until in 1873 Mr. Henry A. Bright, uncovered them, wrote an account of them and put on display for 6 months. The club eventually decided to sell the manuscripts in what is likely to have been an illegal transaction, despite vociferous objections and the establishment of a 'Scots Committee' under the chairmanship of Lord Rosebery who intended to take action in the courts. The Liverpool Athenaeum added 'insult to injury' by revealing that they would use the proceeds of the sale to establish a 'Currie Memorial Fund'.

Dr. James Currie had however signed a letter in 1797 that stated "..that whatever was done as to the returning any letters, papers, etc., should be considered as the act of the widow and transacted in her name."

Sarah, the daughter of James Glencairn and his first wife Sarah, wrote on 27 October 1893 from Cheltenham to Dr. Duncan McNaught, editor of the Robert Burns Federation's 'Burns Chronicle' "I was only 12 years old at my grandmother's death (ie Jean Armour's) consequently I have little recollection of incidents or anecdotes about my grandfather... My father often said it was disgraceful the statements made out by people who lived in the Poet's time, continuing, as they did, so much falsehood and exaggeration of the events of his life. Dr Currie had all the letters and papers sent to him by my grandfather when he wrote the Poet's life, but he never returned them to her, and her sons were too young then to ask for them; so other people became possessed of lettrs and poems of the Poet which ought to have been given back to the family. The copyright of Currie's Life of Burns ought to have been conferred upon his widow, but it was not"

Messrs. Sotheby & Co. exercised their option to purchase the manuscripts on 3 June 1913 and paid £5000. Miss Annie Burns Burns of Cheltenham, the poet's only surviving grandchild, was appointed the Executrix Dative of Robert Burns with a strong legal case for the manuscripts return to the family, however the Liverpool Athenaeum refused. Sotheby's agreed however to abide with any court decision. Joseph W. Hornstein, a London bookdealer, purchased the manuscripts for £5000 by private treaty from Sotheby's and sold them to an American client, who was not however as is sometimes stated, J. Pierpont Morgan. Hornstein reportedly tried to have them returned however he died very soon after the sale.

Another reference gives J. Pierpont Morgan being involved in a proposed purchase in 1903 that fell through due to adverse publicity, explaining the extreme secrecy of the 1913 affair. Additionally it is said that Hornstein's agent approached several prospective purchasers in America without success due to the adverse reaction in Scotland. Some clarity to the confusion comes from the fact that the Liverpool Daily Post and Mercury reminded its readers that circa 10 years before the paper had taken the lead in preventing the Athenaneum from selling the manuscripts on that occasion, probably to J.P.Morgan.

In late 1913 the businessman and antiquarian collector John Gribbel was approached with a view to a sale to him of the Glenriddell Manuscripts. On 21 November 1913 John Gribbel purchased the Glenriddell Manuscripts and on the same day notified Lord Rosebery, Chairman of the Scots Committee, that he intended them to be a gift to the Scottish people in perpetuity and they were one of the first significant donations to the newly created National Library of Scotland in 1926, having previously been in the care of the Edinburgh Corporation from August 1914 to 1919 and the Glasgow Corporation until 1926. The two volumes are now National Library of Scotland MSS.86-87.

== John Gribbel ==
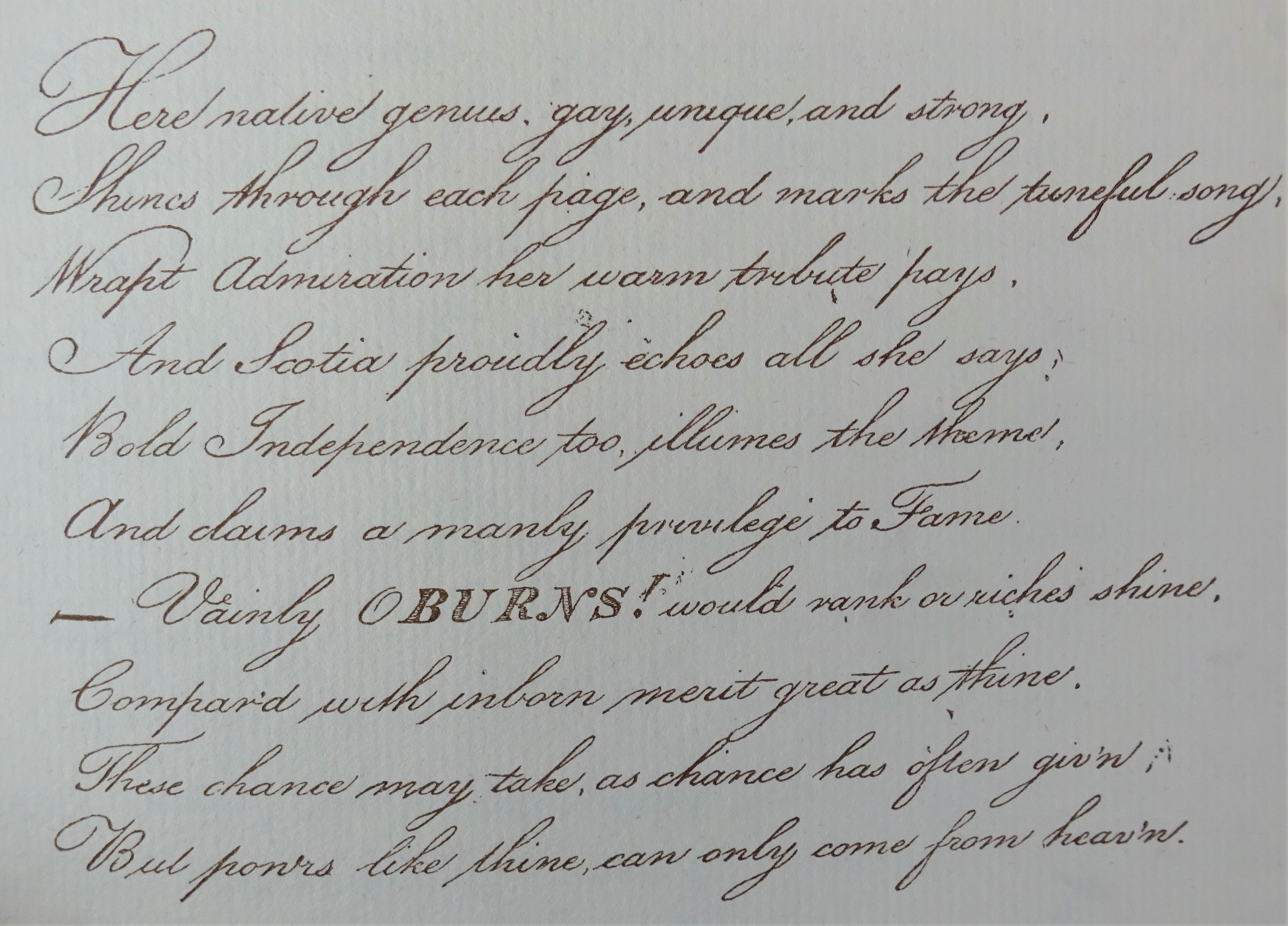
Poetry by Miss Helena Craik of Arbigland that are part of the title page of Volume One.

John Gribbel (29 March 1858 – 25 August 1936) was an American industrialist, businessman, antiquarian and philanthropist. His donation of the Glenriddell Manuscripts to the National Library of Scotland on behalf of the people of Scotland was his best known act of philanthropy.

John Gribbel was already in possession of the first four volume of James Johnson's "The Scots Musical Museum" published between 1787 and 1790, interleaved however with some 140 pages of Burns's explanatory notes on the 184 songs that he contributed. These volumes had long been in the possession of the Riddell family. The set eventually ran to 6 volumes, the last being printed in 1803, well after Burns's death.

== Facsimile copies ==
In 1914 John Gribbel printed, but did not publish, 150 copies of a facsimile of the two manuscripts in Philadelphia. These volumes were for presentation and not for sale. The printer's plates and negatives were broken to prevent further copies being printed. The first volume held an introduction signed by John Gribbel in holograph; the letter from the Scots Committee; a letter from the printer confirming the destruction of the plates; a copy of the Deed of Trust and at the end of the first volume a facsimile of the letter from the widow of William Wallace Currie offering the manuscripts to the Liverpool Athenaeum.

In 1973 an edition of "The Glenriddell Manuscripts of Robert Burns." was published for general sale with facsimile copies of both volumes contents.

== Aftermath ==
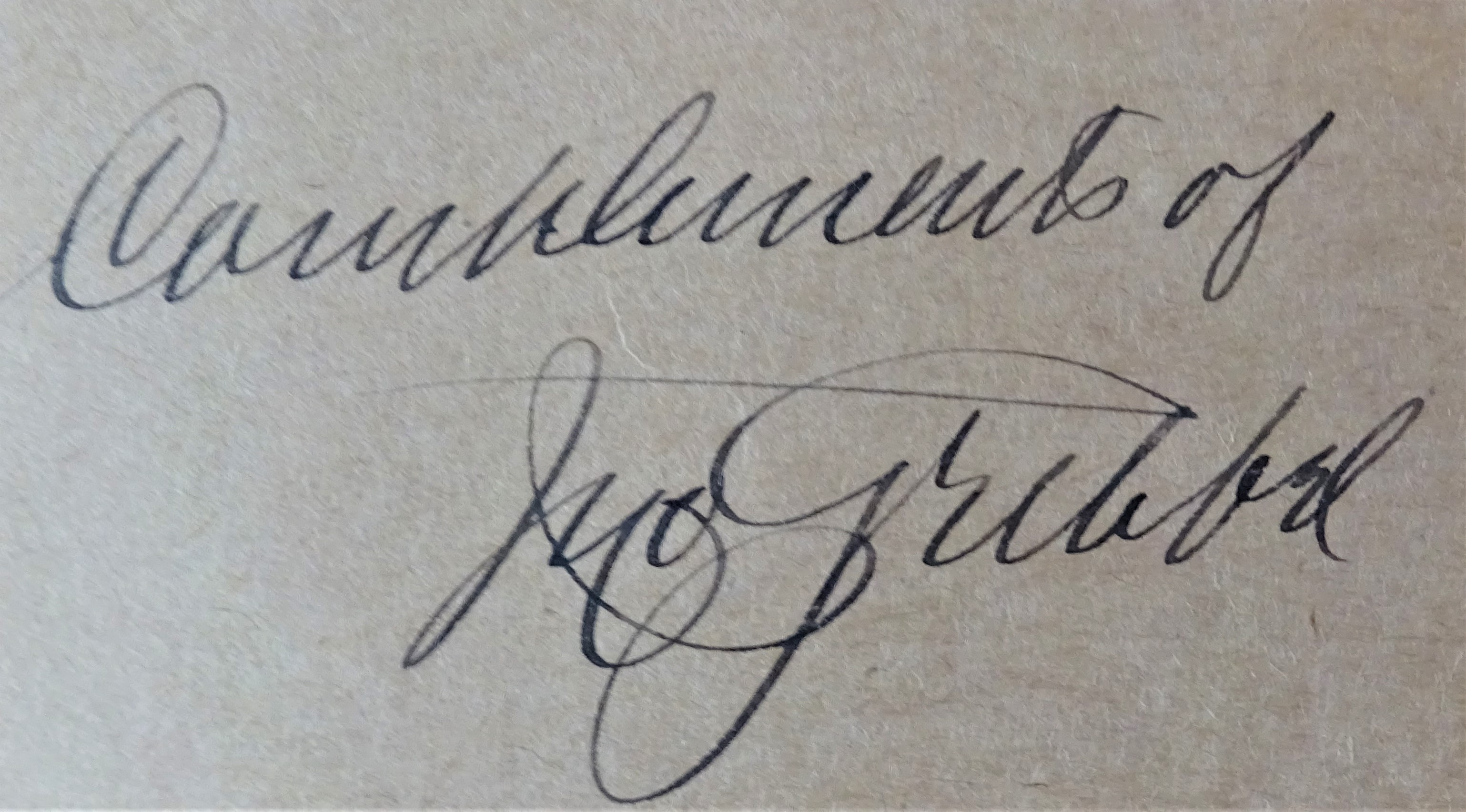
Presentation autograph by John Gribbel

After the cessation of hostilities John Gribbel and his family visited Scotland in the summer of 1920 and they were the honoured guests at several celebratory meals as well as being given an accompanied tour of many of the Burns related sites in Ayrshire and Dumfries and Galloway. An addition to the story is that he visited the Kilmaurs teacher, Dr Duncan McNaught, who had been on the 'Scots Committee', was instrumental in the founding of what became the Robert Burns World Federation and was for over thirty years the editor of the 'Burns Chronicle'. Duncan was acknowledged as one of the world's greatest experts on Robert Burns and had put together what John Gribbel regarded as being the greatest collection of Burnsiana, artifacts with over 600 publications, owning no less than two copies of the Kilmarnock Edition, an uncut example of his having alone been valued at £1000 in circa 1920. John said that he wouldn't leave Ayrshire without these items and made Duncan an offer that was accepted, the amount unknown, on the understanding that they would be kept together under the name The McNaught Collection.

When John Gribbel died in 1936 his estate was broken up and 'The McNaught Collection' sold at auction. One copy of his Poems, Chiefly in the Scottish Dialect's is now held by Cornell University and the second is at the University of Delaware. A recent estimate is that only 86 copies survive of the 612 'Kilmarnock Editions' that were printed.

== The Manuscripts and their contents ==
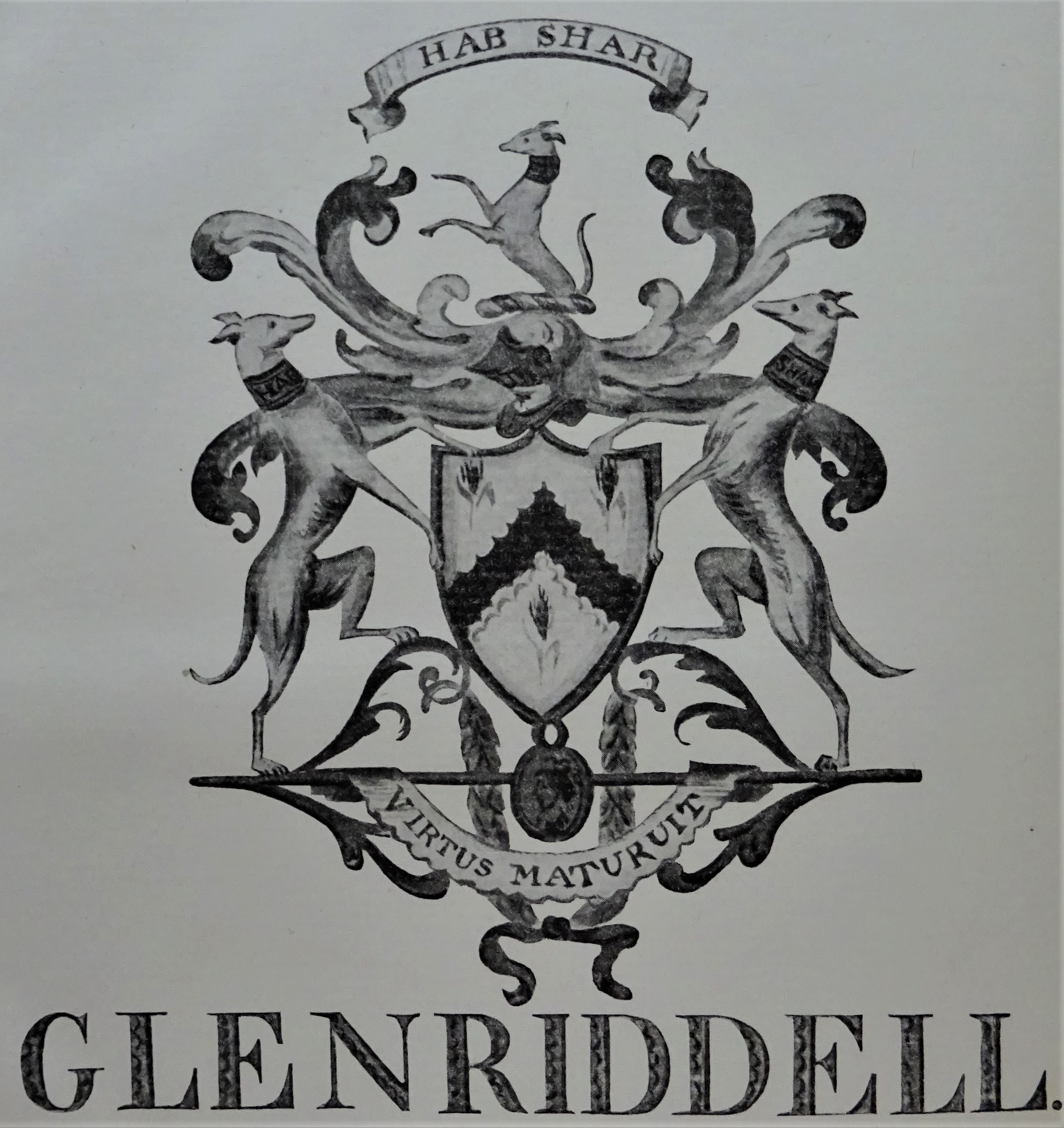
Robert Riddell's coat of arms and armorial crest

The first volume contained what at the time were fifty-three unpublished poems and twenty-two letters were in the second volume. Egerer however records fifty-seven and twenty-seven possibly as a result of Burns's having also added extra stanzas or updates that have sometimes been counted as free standing poems. The autobiographical letter to Dr Moore was also included in the first volume, written almost entirely in the hand of the unnamed amanuensis. Burns added various footnotes throughout the work, such as the detailed notes where he disowns the spelling, punctuation, incorrect titles, etc. in the Dr Moore letter. Burns mentions that the amanuensis was a clergyman whilst chiding him for the errors he had made. A few notes such as "Printed II 247" on "The Whistle - A Ballad" have been added in another hand.

Three different hands are evident in the volumes and it has been noted that Robert Heron the writer had visited Burns at Ellisland Farm in the autumn of 1789 whilst a divinity student. Another suggested by Nigel Leask may be Helena Craik of Arbigland. Burns started work on the first volume in May of that year.

Burns wrote in the manuscript that "...If my Poems which I have transcribed into your book were equal to the grateful respect and high esteem I bear for the Gentleman to whom I present them, they would be the finest Poems in any language."

The first volume contained several significant unpublished examples of Burns's work such as the "Lament for James, Earl of Glencairn"; "Epistle to John Goldie"; "Elegy on the Death of Sir James Hunter Blair"; "Tam o'Shanter" and "Holy Willie's Prayer".

Burns also added the lines "Let these be regarded as the genuine sentiments of a man who seldom flattered any, and never those he loved."

The pages have been numbered with the number placed in the centre of the top of the page and bracketed on the amanuenis's work and unbracketed on the top right or left of the page on those with Burns's writing, but not always on the fore-edge side. On page 164, in a new hand, is a contents page that lists the categories of the works, their length in pages used and the identity of the writer as 'Burns' or 'Amanuensis'. In Volume 2 the first six pages are blank although numbered an throughout all 103 pages Burns placed the bracketed page number at the top centre.

The volumes were disfigured in Liverpool for these unique works carry at least two library stamp designs, both with the wording "ATHENAEUM LIVERPOOL" at the start and near the finish of the first volume, etc. The page opposite Mrs Currie's letter is covered with mainly crossed out numbers that may relate to the 'calculations' for the aforementioned 'Contents' page.

=== The Abridged First Commonplace Book ===
Burns prepared an abridged version of his First Commonplace Book of 1783–1785 for the second volume of the Glenriddell Manuscripts. He was still working on the second volume in late 1793. The folio has 42 pages and about 1250 lines of manuscript, whilst the quarto abridgement covers pages 31 to 42, twelve pages with 232 lines of manuscript. Only two pieces of poetry are included, being 22 lines beginning Of all the numerous ills that hurt our peace and 20 lines of experimental blank verse beginning All devil as I am, a damned wretch. The remainder of the abridged material is prose.

Burns prefaced the abridgement: On rummaging over some old papers, I lighted on a M.S.S. of my early years, in which I had determined to write myself out; as I was placed by Fortune among a class of men to whom my ideas would have been nonsense. I had meant that the book would have lain by me, in the fond hope that, some time or other, even after I was no more, my thoughts would fall into the hands of somebody capable of appreciating their value. At the end of the abridgement he wrote This is all that, & perhaps more than, is worth quoting, in my M.S.S.

=== The Fourth Commonplace Book ===
The Glenriddell Manuscripts are treated as a third Commonplace Book and a fourth also existed, known as the 'Farming Memorandum Book'. It contained notes of farming but also drafts of poems and at least one song with notes on Scottish sings similar to those in Riddell's Robert Burns's Interleaved Scots Musical Museum volumes. Small parts were published by James Currie and the biographer Kinsley was aware if it, however its whereabouts are unknown and it may have been lost or destroyed whilst in the hands of Currie.

=== Burns's portrait ===
John Beugo's portrait of Burns is included in both volumes of the work, known as such because he engraved the copper plate required for the printing process. Alexander Nasmyth was a landscape painter and was a reluctant portrait painter, however he met with Burns and they became friends, resulting in Nasmyth producing a portrait which he never fully completed due to his concern over spoiling what he had already achieved. John Beugo the engraver arranged several sittings with Burns and produced a better likeness as confirmed by Gilbert Burns. Nasmyth refused payment from William Creech and gave the painting to Jean Armour.

== The poems and songs in Volume One ==
1. Bonnie Dundee. *
2. Anna, thy charms my bosom fire. *
3. Epistle to John Goldie, in Kilmarnock.
4. To Miss Jenny Cruikshank.
5. Written in Friars Carse Hermitage.
6. On Captain Grose's peregrinations through Scotland.
7. Ode to the departed Regency-bill. 1789.
8. Alteration of "Written in Friars' Carse Hermitage."
9. Yestreen I had a pint o'wine. *
10. I murder hate by field or flood. *
11. Holy Willie's Prayer.
12. Epigram - On Captain F. Grose, Antiquarian.
13. Additional Stanza to "Yestreen I had a pint o'wine. *
14. Copy of a Letter from Mr. Burns to Doctor Moor.
15. Tam O'Shanter - A Tale.
16. On the death of Sir James Hunter Blair.
17. Written on the blank leaf of a Copy of the First Edition of my Poems, which I presented to an oldSweet-Heart then married.
18. On reading in a newspaper the death of J.M'Leod, Esquire, brother to Miss Isabella M'Leod, a particular friend of the Author.
19. Epitaph on a Friend.
20. The Humble Petition of Bruar Water to the Noble Duke of Athole.
21. Extempore Epistle to Mr.M'Adam of Craigengillan.
22. On scaring some Water-fowl in Loch-Turit, a wild scene among the hills of Oughtertyre.
23. Written in the Hermitage of Taymouth.
24. Written at the Fall of Fyers.
25. Written by Somebody on the window of an Inn at Stirling, on seeing the royal palace in ruins.
26. Epistle to Robert Graham, Esq., of Fintry, on the election for the Dumfries string of Boroughs, Anno 1790.
27. A Poet's welcome to his love-begotten daughter, the first instance that entitled him to the venerable appellation of Father.
28. The Five Carlins - A Ballad.
29. Extempore, nearly - On the birth of Monsieur Henri, Posthumous child to a Monsieur Henri, a gentleman of family and fortune from Switzerland, who died in three days' illness, leaving his lady, a sister of Sir Thos. Wallace, in her sixth month of this her first child. The lady and her family were particular friends of the Author. The child was born in November 1790.
30. Birthday Ode - 31st December, 1787.
31. Ode - Sacred to the memory of Mrs. Oswald of Auchencruive.
32. Extempore - To Mr Gavin Hamilton.
33. Lament of Mary Queen of Scots.
34. Epistle to Robert Graham Esq., of Fintry, requesting a favor.
35. Jeremiah, 15th Chapter, 10th Verse.
36. From Clarinda - On Mr. B(urns) saying that he had "nothing else to do."
37. Answer to the foregoing - Extempore.
38. On the death of the late Lord President Dundas.
39. The Whistle - A Ballad.
40. A new Psalm for the Chapel of Kilmarnock, on the thanksgiving day for His Majesty's recovery.
41. A Ballad - On the Heresy of Dr. M'Gill in Ayr.
42. To Robert Graham, Esq., of Fintry, on receiving a favor.
43. Written in a wrapper enclosing a Letter to Captain Grose, to be left with Mr. Cardonnel, Antiquarian.
44. A Fragment - On Glenriddell's Fox breaking his chain.
45. Lament for James Earl of Glencairn.
46. Epistle to Robert Graham, Esq., of Fintry, 5th October, 1791.
47. Lines to Sir John Whitefoord of Whitefoord, with a Poem to the Memory of Lord Glencairn.
48. A Grace before dinner - Extempore.
49. Epigram - On being asked why God had made Miss Davies so little and Mrs._____ so big.
50. Epigram - On hearing it said that there was falsehood in his looks.
51. Epigram - On Captain W. Ruddock of Corbiston.
52. Epigram - On W. Graham, Esg., of Mosskin.
53. Epigram - Pinned to Mrs. Walter Riddell's carriage.
54. Epitaph - On John Busby.
55. Epitaph - On the Laird of Cardoness.

Tipped in - Mrs.Currie's letter dated 6th December, 1853, presenting the volumes to the Liverpool Athenaeum.

- - Songs

== The Letters by Mr. Burns in Volume Two ==
1. To William Nicol (Carlisle, June 1, 1787).
2. To John Arnot of Dalquhatswood (April, 1786).
3. To Charles Sharpe of Hoddam (April, 1791).
4. To Alexander Cunningham (24th January, 1789).
5. To Mrs. Stewart of Stair (September, 1786).
6. To Miss Wilhelmina Alexander (18th November, 1786).
7. To John M'Murdo (July, 1793).
8. First Common-place Book (Abridged).
9. To the Right Honourable William Pitt, Esquire (February, 1789).
10. To Miss M'Murdo (July, 1793).
11. To the Earl of Glencairn (February, 1787).
12. To Crawford Tait (15th October, 1790).
13. To Miss Helena Craik (August, 1790).
14. To John Francis Erskine of Mar (13th April, 1793).
15. To Alexander Cunningham (11th June, 1791).
16. Letter dictated for James Clarke to the Lord Provost of Edinburgh (June, 1791).
17. To William Smellie (22d January, 1792).
18. To Mr. Corbet (September, 1792).
19. Letter for Mr. Clarke to send to Mr. Williamson (June, 1791).
20. To the Duke of Queensberry (October, 1789).
21. From William Nicol (20th February, 1793).
22. Reply: To William Nicol (20th February, 1793).
23. To Mrs. M'Lehose (March, 1793).
24. To Miss Lessly Bailie (May, 1793).

== See also ==
- Robert Burns's Commonplace Book 1783–1785
- Robert Burns World Federation
- Burns Clubs
- Irvine Burns Club
- The Geddes Burns
