= Robert Burns's Interleaved Scots Musical Museum =

Annotated version of 18th-century publication

Robert Burn's Interleaved Scots Musical Museum
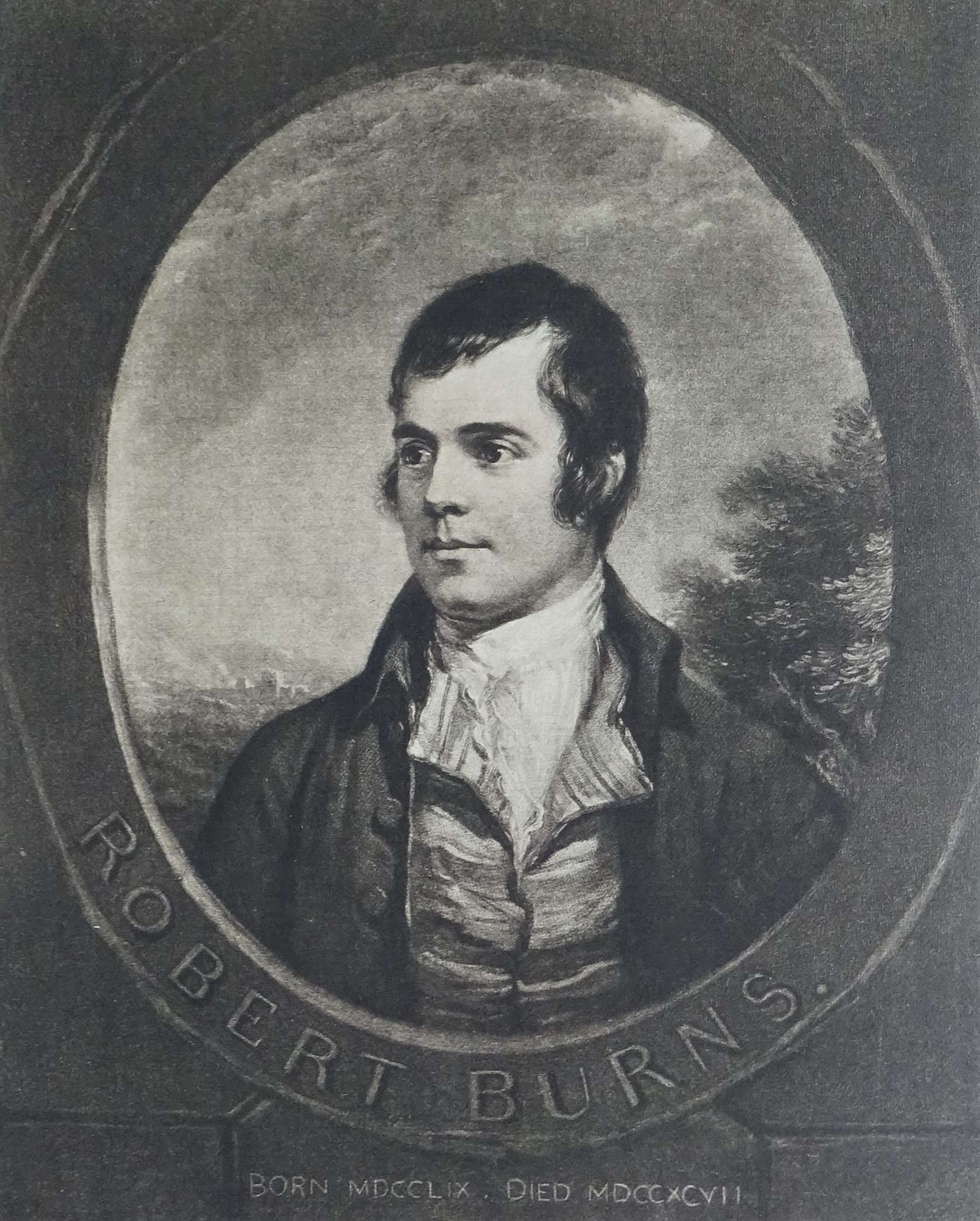
- Engraving after A. Nasmyth from the 1938 facsimile
- Author: Robert Burns
- Language: Scots
- Genre: Songs and Lyrics
- Publisher: James Johnson
- Publication place: Great Britain

'Robert Burns's Interleaved Scots Musical Museum' or the 'Interleaved Glenriddell Manuscript' is a set of four octavo volumes of James Johnson's The Scots Musical Museum in which Robert Burns provided additional material to the original publication on interleaved sheets and which he eventually gifted to Captain Robert Riddell (1755–94) of Friars Carse, Dumfries and Galloway, Scotland.

== The Scots Musical Museum ==
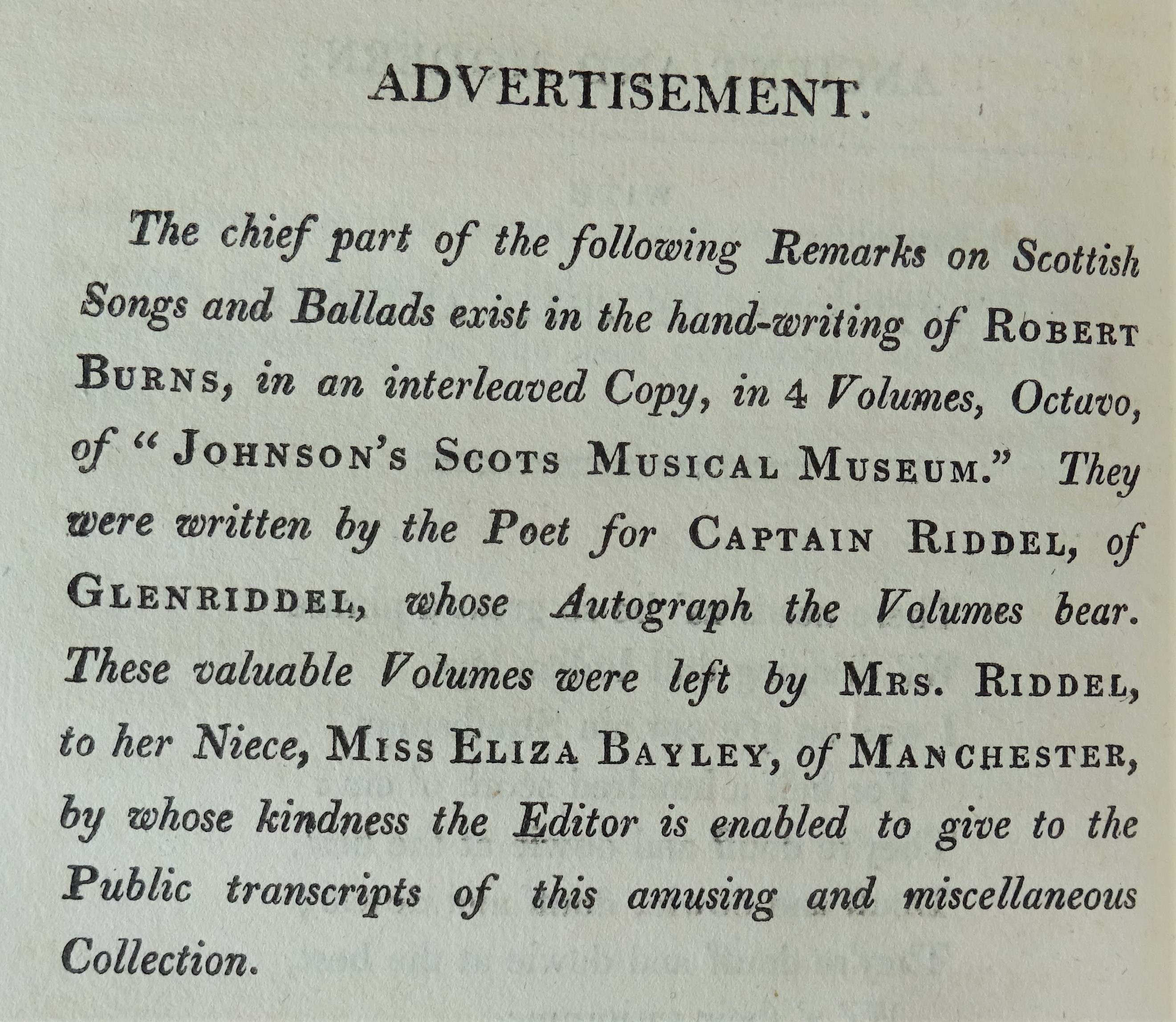
Cromek's Strictures by Robert Burns.

Burns started collecting song material from 1787 to send to James Johnson's The Scots Musical Museum. This new project was one of his greatest achievement as a songwriter and collector. He is considered to have contributed a third (220) of his own compositions to the Museum of 600 songs. Burns collected these songs from a wide variety of sources, often revising or expanding them, including much of his own work. The term Museum here made reference to the Muse of song or Euterpe, inspiration for the lyrics of this, the greatest collection of Scots songs ever produced.

Burns expended considerable energy on the project and whilst preparing for the 1792 expanded edition of his poems he still was able to supply 50 songs for the 'Museum' between 1790 and August 1792 as well as being credited with writing the Preface for the fourth volume issued on 13 August 1792.

Johnson had probably met Burns through their joint membership of the Crochallan Fencibles club however his first volume was already at the press at the time, but Burns still contributed four songs.

The work, planned as a two volume set, eventually became six volumes after considerable encouragement from Burns and was published between 1787 and after Burns's death, volume six was issued in 1803. Acting as the effective editor Burns also collected and 'restored' around fifty songs for the publication. The combination of innovation and his penchant for antiquarianism gave the work a lasting feeling of living tradition.

Audio file of 'Ae Fond Kiss

Although, as stated, Burns was effectively the editor, Johnson was the official editor, engraver, printer and publisher; Stephen Clarke (1735–97) was the musical editor and William Clarke was the musical editor for Volume VI.

Burns accepted no payment and much of this time-consuming project relates to his early years in the Excise when he had included the supervision of twelve parishes and around 200 miles of travel on horseback each week.

A 1794 copy of a letter from Burns to James Johnson was enclosed in the first volume "In In the meantime at your leisure give a copy of the "Museum" to my worthy friend, Mr Peter Hill, Bookseller, to bind for me, interleaved with blank leaves, exactly as he did the Laird of Glenriddel's that I may insert every anecdote I can learn together with my criticisms and remarks on the songs. A copy of this I shall leave with you, the editor, to publish at some after period by way of making the Museum a book famous to the end of time and you renowned forever."

=== Previous song manuscripts ===
In 1786 he had already provided a 'parcel of songs' to Mrs Catherine Stewart of Stair, the Stair Manuscript and again in 1791, the Afton Lodge Manuscript. Additionally the so-called 'Geddes Burns' of Poems, Chiefly in the Scottish Dialect (Edinburgh Edition) contains holograph insertions on the end pages of twelve new songs thirteen and poems.Riddell's notes reveal that he had stimulated Burns to not only recover, mend or add to old fragments, but also to examine them as a scholar. The new works in this volume show that Burns's time in the area was highly productive in terms of his imaginative inspirations and resultant songs and poems.

=== Robert Riddell's interleaved volumes ===
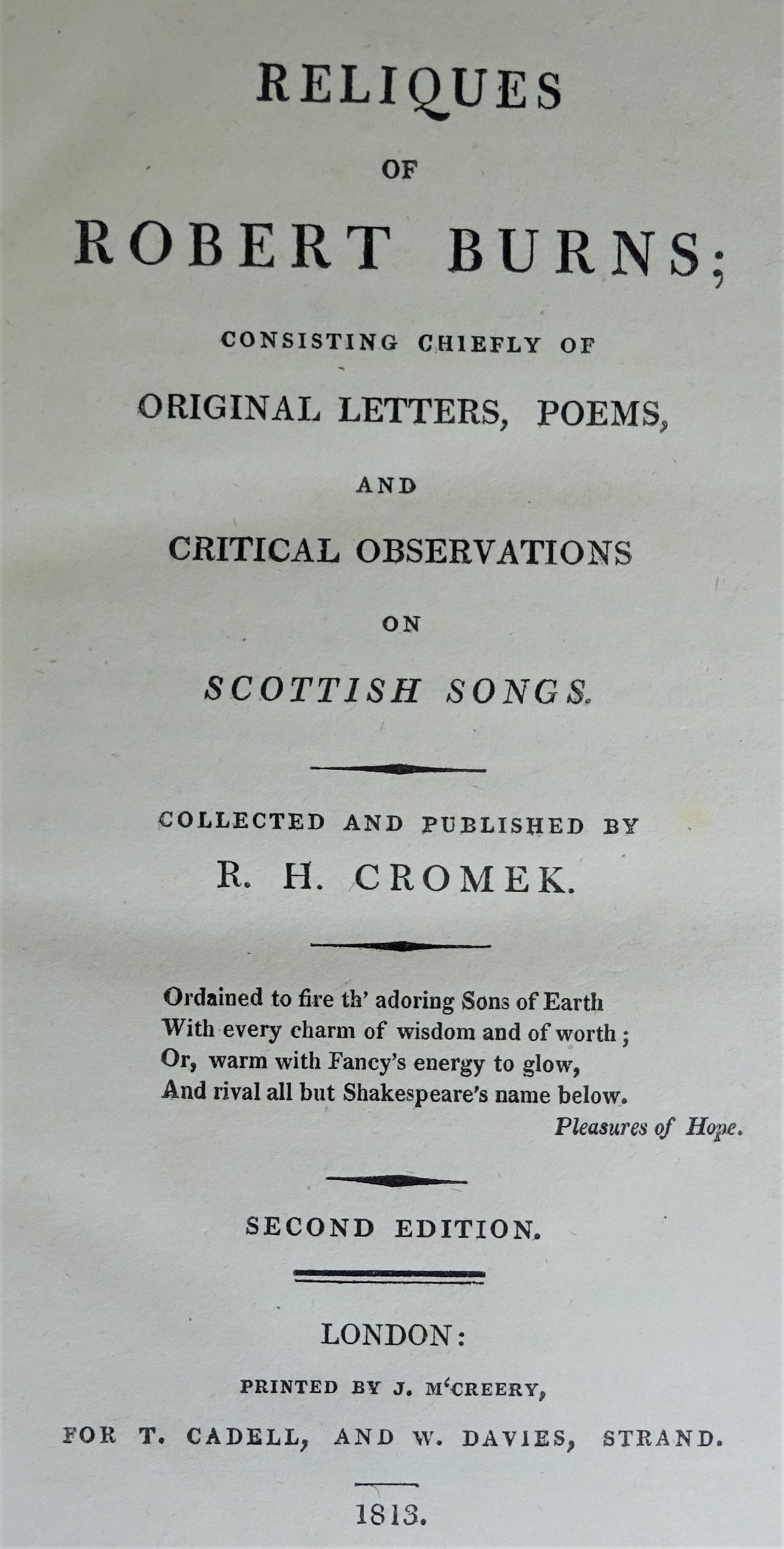
Title page of 'Reliques of Robert Burns'.

From 1788, Captain Robert Riddell, Burns's Ellisland Farm neighbour at the Friars Carse estate, increasingly became a mentor. After making up an interleaved set of the first four of The Scots Musical Museum in late 1792, Burns provided additional songs and annotative material and made a present of this set to his neighbour. Mackay records that Robert Riddell first supplied Burns with the interleaved volumes as he had done for the poet when he wrote the Glenriddell Manuscripts. These first four volumes had been published between 1787 and 1790.

The notes written on the interleaved sheets of The Scots Musical Museum consist of interleaved sheets with some 140 pages of Burns's explanatory notes on the 160 to 184 songs that he contributed. The notes are by Burns and also some by Riddell himself. Upon Robert Riddell's death the 'Interleaved Museum' became the property of his wife and passed from her to Miss Eliza Bayley of Manchester, her niece, who gave the biographer Robert Hartley Cromek full access to it.

A London bookseller, John Salkeld, acquired it in 1871 as part of a job lot, advertised in his catalogue for £110 and it was purchased by H. F. Nicols, a book collector. Nicols left his library to Miss Oakshott who had been his housekeeper. J.C.Dick located the volumes in this lady's possession and it was then sold at Sotheby's on October 30, 1903, to Mr. Quaritch of Piccadilly, who in turn sold them to Mr. George C. Thomas, of Philadelphia. The 'Interleaved Museum' was in John Gribbel's possession before 1913, the date when he purchased the Glenriddell Manuscripts. When John Gribbel died in 1936 his estate was broken up and his collection was sold at auction.

In 1964 the Rabinowitz Library in America held the volumes and via Bernard Quaritch Ltd the trustees of the Burns Monument were contacted with view to a sale that was settled on £5500, a then record sum for a Burns work.

Cromek had published Burn's and Riddell's notes in 1808, with an 1813 second edition. In 1902, as stated, J.C.Dick discovered them and in 1906 he published Notes on Scottish Song by Robert Burns, distinguishing between Burns's notes from those added by Riddell and in addition categorizing some as spurious.

David Cuthbertson in 1922 was researching in the Laing Collection at Edinburgh University library when he stumbled upon a manuscript of twelve folio pages in Burns's handwriting. This manuscript contained most of what until then had been considered as doubtful material in Cromek's work. The announcement of the discovery was published in the Kilmarnock Standard.

Together with J.C.Dick's "Songs of Robert Burns" and Davidson Cook's annotations thereon, it was re-issued in 1962 as a single volume by Folklore Associates, Hatboro, Pennsylvania.

=== The notes ===
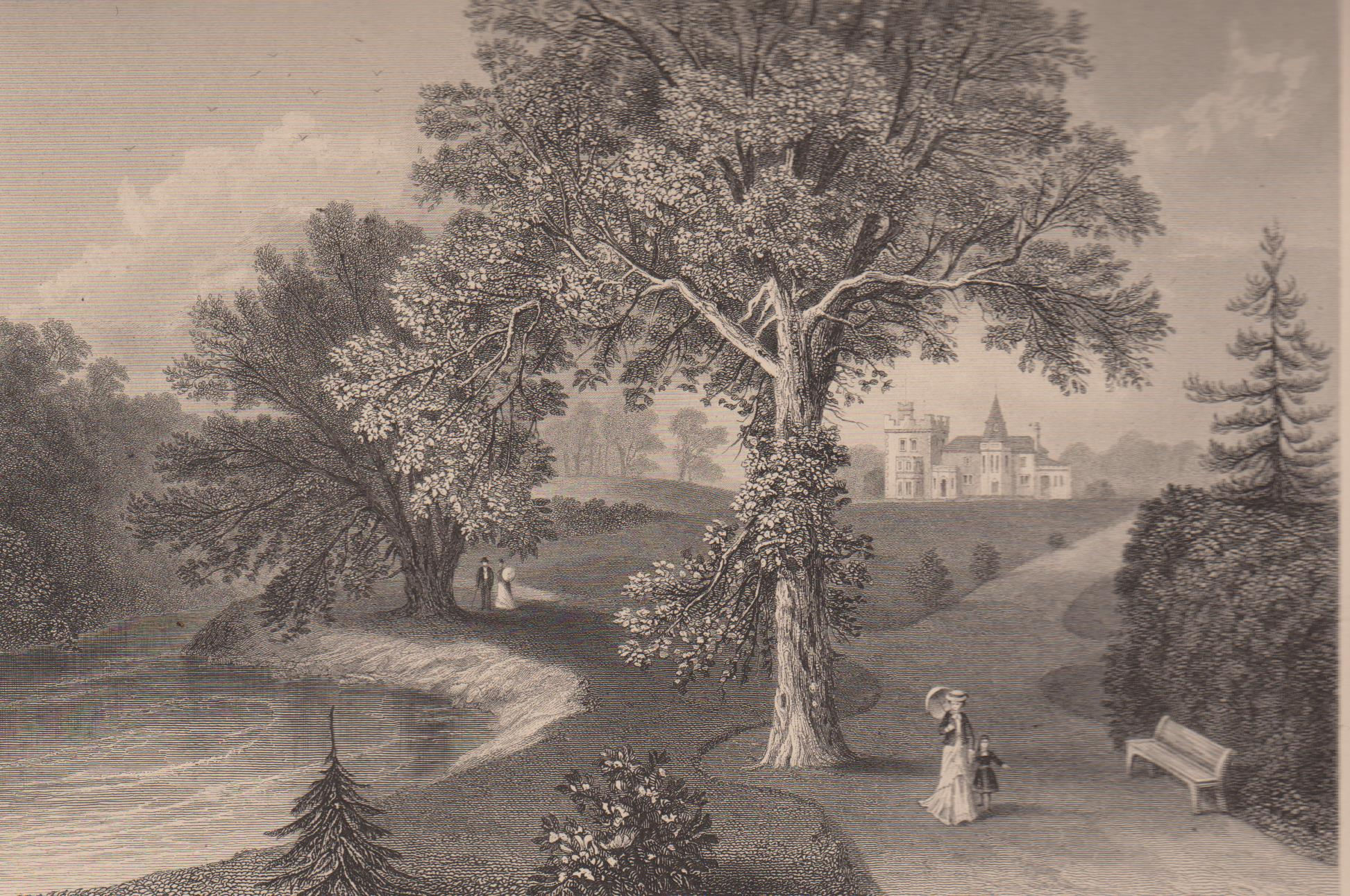
Friars' Carse circa 1800

Burns wrote numerous notes or strictures on the songs, some of which are very brief and even terse. He rarely commented on his own verses other than to apologise for them, his emphasis being on the sources for the songs and his reasons for altering them, such as adding political content. Riddell's own notes reveal that he had stimulated Burns to not only recover, mend or add to old fragments, but also to examine them as a scholar.

Burns used a system of signature letters to indicate the extent to which he had altered, restored, etc. the songs, such as S, R, X, and Z. In a letter to Frances Dunlop he revealed that Those marked, Z, I have given to the world as old verses to their respective tunes; but in fact, of a good many of them, little more than the Chorus is ancient.

R.H.Cromek, as stated, was able to examine the volumes owned by Eliza Bayley and pages 187 to 306 of his Reliques of Robert Burns, published in 1808, carry a transcript of the Notes. Editors of Burns had relied on the accuracy of the information but considerable and somewhat justifiable doubts existed as to their veracity. When the Interleaved Museum was 'rediscovered' after an absence of nearly a century a comparison with Cromek's Reliques was possible and it was found that out of 173 Notes printed by Cromek only 127 were verbatim copies; eighteen were garbled or imperfect, four differing entirely from the manuscript. Another four were written partly by Burns and partly by Robert Riddell; fourteen were written entirely by Riddell or by someone other than Burns; finally, fourteen were never in the manuscript, and the leaves of four had been cut out and are missing.

Famously, when David Cuthbertson discovered the twelve folio manuscripts in Edinburgh the crucial page carrying the note on The Highland Lassie O was not one of them. Cromek's reputation having been somewhat repaired the veracity of this story (see ix below) has been strengthened.

=== Examples of Notes from Cromek's Reliques ===
i. Auld lang syne - Ramsay here, as usual with him, has taken the idea of the song, and the first line, from the old fragment, which may be seen in "the museum", vol.v.

ii. Wllie brew'd a Peck o' Maut - This air is Masterton's; the song mine. The occasion of it was this. Mr. Wm. Nicol, of the High School, Edinburgh, during the autumn vacation being at Moffat, honest Allan, who was at the time on a visit to Dalswinton, and I went to pay Nicol a visit. We had such a joyous meeting that Mr. Masterton and I agreed, each in our own way, that we should celebrate the business.

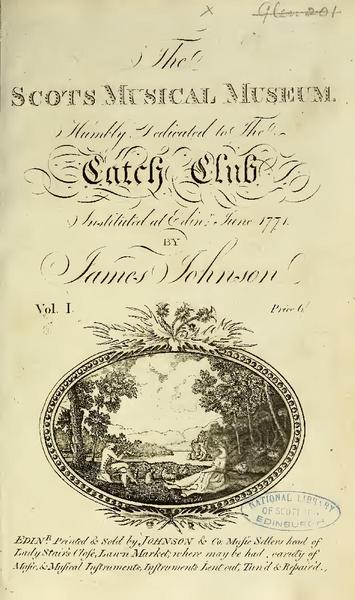
The title page of The Scots Musical Museum.

iii. I love my Jean - This air is by Marshal; the song I composed out of compliment to Mrs. Burns. N.B. It was during the honey-moon.

iv. Ca' the Ewes to the Knowes - This beautiful song is the true old Scotch taste, yet I do not know that either air, or words, were in print before.

v. The Braes o' Ballochmyle - This air is the composition of my friend Allan Masterton, in Edinburgh. I composed the verses on the amiable and excellent family of Whitefoord's leaving Ballochmyle, when Sir John's misfortunes had obliged him to sell the estate.

vi. The bonie Banks of Ayr - I composed this song as I convoyed my chest as far on the road to Greenock, where I was to embark in a few days for Jamaica. I meant it as my farewel Dirge to my native land.

vii. Galloway Tam - I have seen an interlude (acted as a wedding) to this tune, called "The Wooing of the Maiden." These entertainments are now much worn out in this part of Scotland. Two are still retained in Nithsdale, viz. Jilly Pure Auld Glenae, and this one, "The Wooing of the Maiden".

viii. The Beds of sweet Roses - This song, as far as I know, for the first time appears here in print --- When I was a boy, it was a very popular song in Ayrshire, I remember to have heard those fanatics, the Buchanites, sing some of their nonsensical rhymes, which they dignify with the name of hymns, to this air.

ix. "The Highland Lassie O" was a composition written by Burns early in his life, before he became widely known. Accordingly to Burns, the song was inspired by a romantic relationship with a women from the Highlands. He later described meeting her near the River Ayr before her departure to the West Highlands and stated that she died from illness shortly after arriving in Greenock.

x. My Jo, Janet - Johnson, the publisher, with a foolish delicacy, refused to insert the last stanza of this humorous ballad.

xi. O'er the Moor among the Heather - This song is the composition of a Jean Glover, a girl who was not only a whore, but also a thief; and in one or other character has visited most of the Correction Houses in the West. She was born I believe in Kilmarnock, I took the song down from her singing as she was strolling through the country, with a sleight-of-hand blackguard.

== Legacy ==
Burns's notes have provided a good number of insights into his personality, literary style, influences, etc., however the one to one communication on a friendship based 'correspondence' is not as revealing as his business style letters with George Thomson in particular, editor of A Select Collection of Original Scottish Airs for the Voice to which Burns contributed 100 songs.

== See also ==
- A Manual of Religious Belief
- Poems, Chiefly in the Scottish Dialect (Edinburgh Edition)
- Poems, Chiefly in the Scottish Dialect (Second Edinburgh Edition)
- Poems, Chiefly in the Scottish Dialect (London Edition)
- Glenriddell Manuscripts
- Robert Burns's Commonplace Book 1783–1785
- The Geddes Burns
- Robert Burns World Federation
- Burns Clubs
