= Duncan McNaught =

Scottish parochial school teacher (1845–1925)

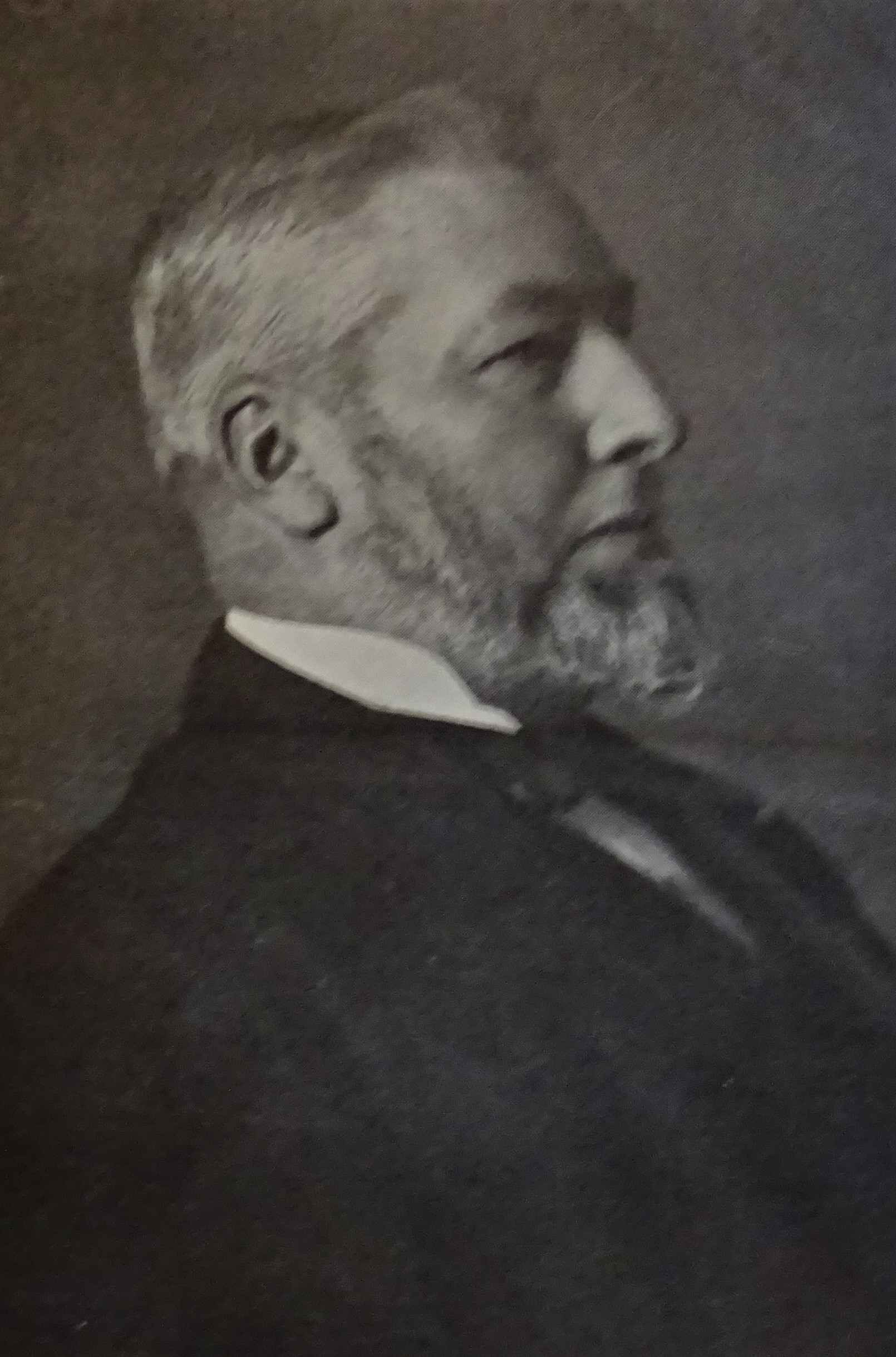
- Duncan McNaught LL.D., J.P.
- Born: 1845; Alexandria, Dunbartonshire, Scotland
- Died: 1 June 1925 (aged 79–80); Stewarton, Scotland
- Occupation: Parochial School teacher

Duncan McNaught LL.D., J.P., (1845 – 1 June 1925) was born in Alexandria, Dunbartonshire in 1845. He was the parochial school teacher at Kilmaurs in East Ayrshire from 1867 and served at the school for over fifty years, having served as assistant from 1865. He founded the Kilmarnock Conservative Association, jointly founded the Robert Burns World Federation, acted as the editor of the "Burns Chronicle" and was the president of what became the Robert Burns World Federation.

== Life and background ==
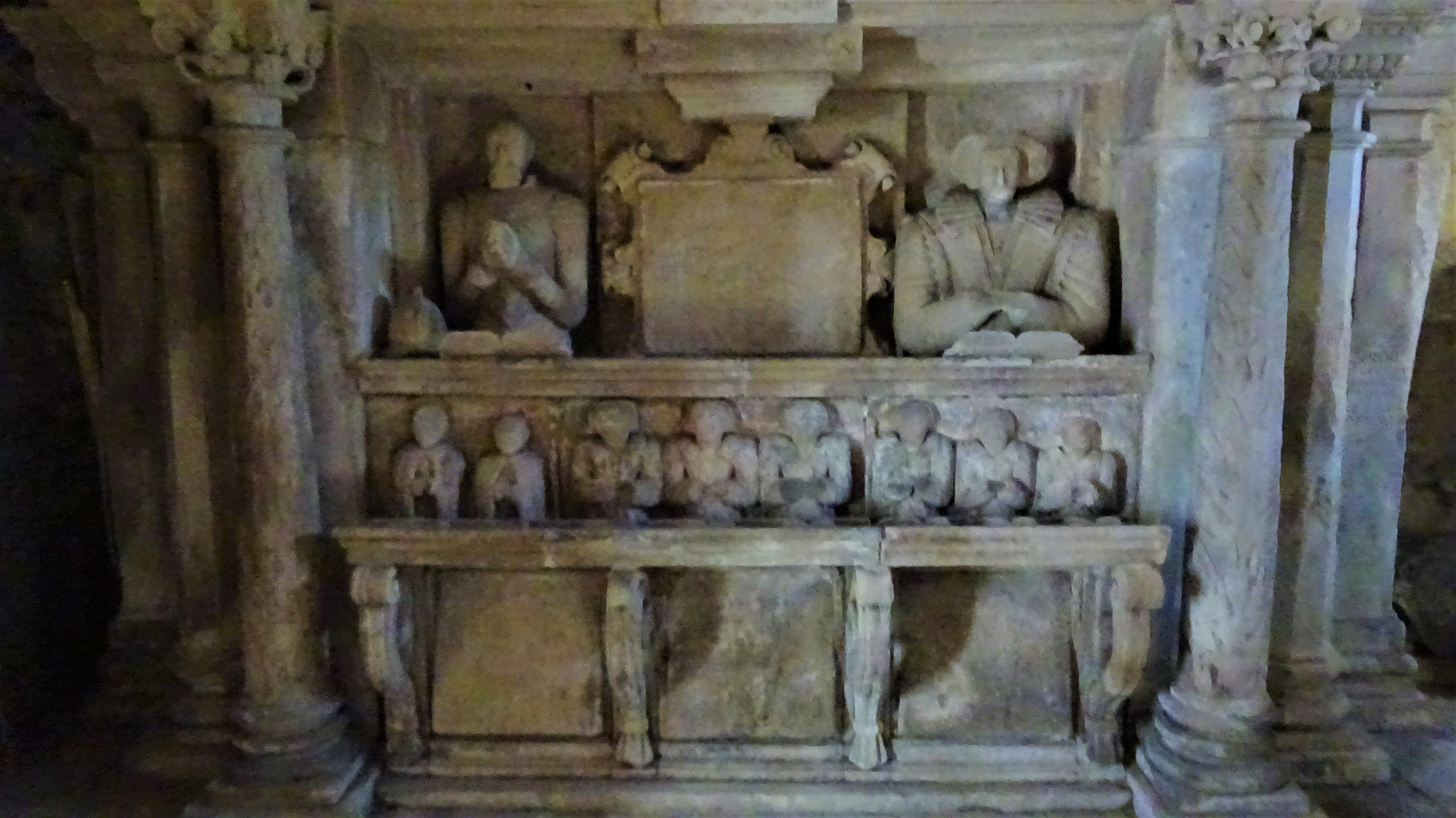
The monument to the 7th Earl of Glencairn, his countess and his children.

In 1870 McNaught was approached by Sir William Montgomerie Cunninghame of Corsehill with a request for assistance with the restoration of the 1600 AD monument to the 7th Earl of Glencairn, his countess and their children that stands in the Glencairn Aisle. The crypt beneath the aisle was first excavated and portions of the monument were recovered. The monument was extensively restored by Robert Boyd, an employee of Messrs. Boyd and Forrest of Stewarton.

He had a great interest in history and archaeology. The crannog at Buiston, locally known as the 'Swan Knowe', lay around 70 m from the northern shore of the Buiston crannog and was first identified in December 1880 from 'worked' timbers located within the drainage 'gote' or ditch on the site by Duncan McNaught, who was familiar with the Lochlee crannog site. The crannog was first excavated in 1880 and more thoroughly in April 1881.

In 1921, in recognition of his distinguished services as a parochial school teacher, editor of the Kilmarnock Herald, 'Burns Chronicle' editor and Kilmaurs parish historian, Duncan in 1921 was honoured by the University of Glasgow, which conferred upon him an honorary doctorate of law, and by the Burns Federation, which on two occasions presented him with tokens of recognition for services rendered. Duncan was also a Justice of the Peace.

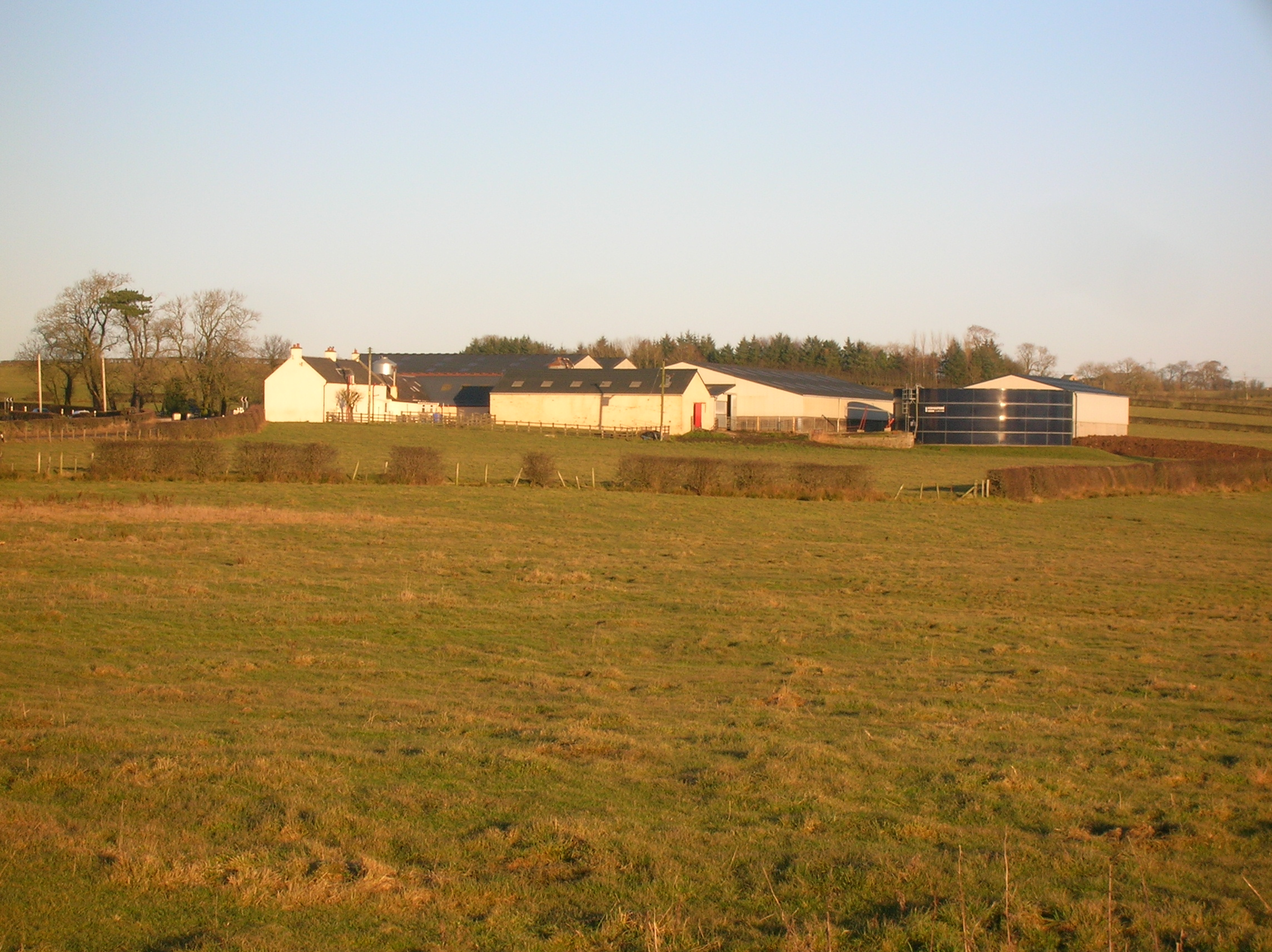
Lochside Farm

In his book 1912 book "Kilmaurs Parish and Burgh" Duncan McNaught recorded many local events such as that thanks to the introduction of a 'gravitation water supply' the Maak's or Monk's Well had recently been 'closed up' as it was no longer required.

In 1921 it is recorded in Hansard that questions were asked of the Secretary for Scotland in regard of the education authority for Scotland refusing to pay the lump sum payable under their superannuation scheme to Duncan and three other parochial teachers who had retired after the age of 65. One of the questions read "Is the Hon. Gentleman aware that Mr. Duncan McNaught is the greatest living authority on the important subject of the life of Robert Burns, and was it not greatly to the public advantage in Scotland that he should have gone on for this extra number of years teaching the children of Scotland?"

He died suddenly from a heart attack in 1925.

=== Family ===
Duncan married Martha Morton (b.1848. d. 31 Oct. 1923) and had six offspring, Duncan (b.1870), Jane (b.1871), George (b.1873. d.23 Nov 1920), John (b.1875. d. 13 Nov. 1919), William David (b.1879. d.16 July 1940) and James Mcgeoch (b.1881. d.13 Nov. 1919) who were all born in Kilmaurs, East Ayrshire. Martha died aged 75 and is buried with her husband in Kilmaurs.

=== Death and memorials ===
Duncan died of heart failure at his home, Benrig, in Kilmaurs on 1 June 1925 at the age of 81.

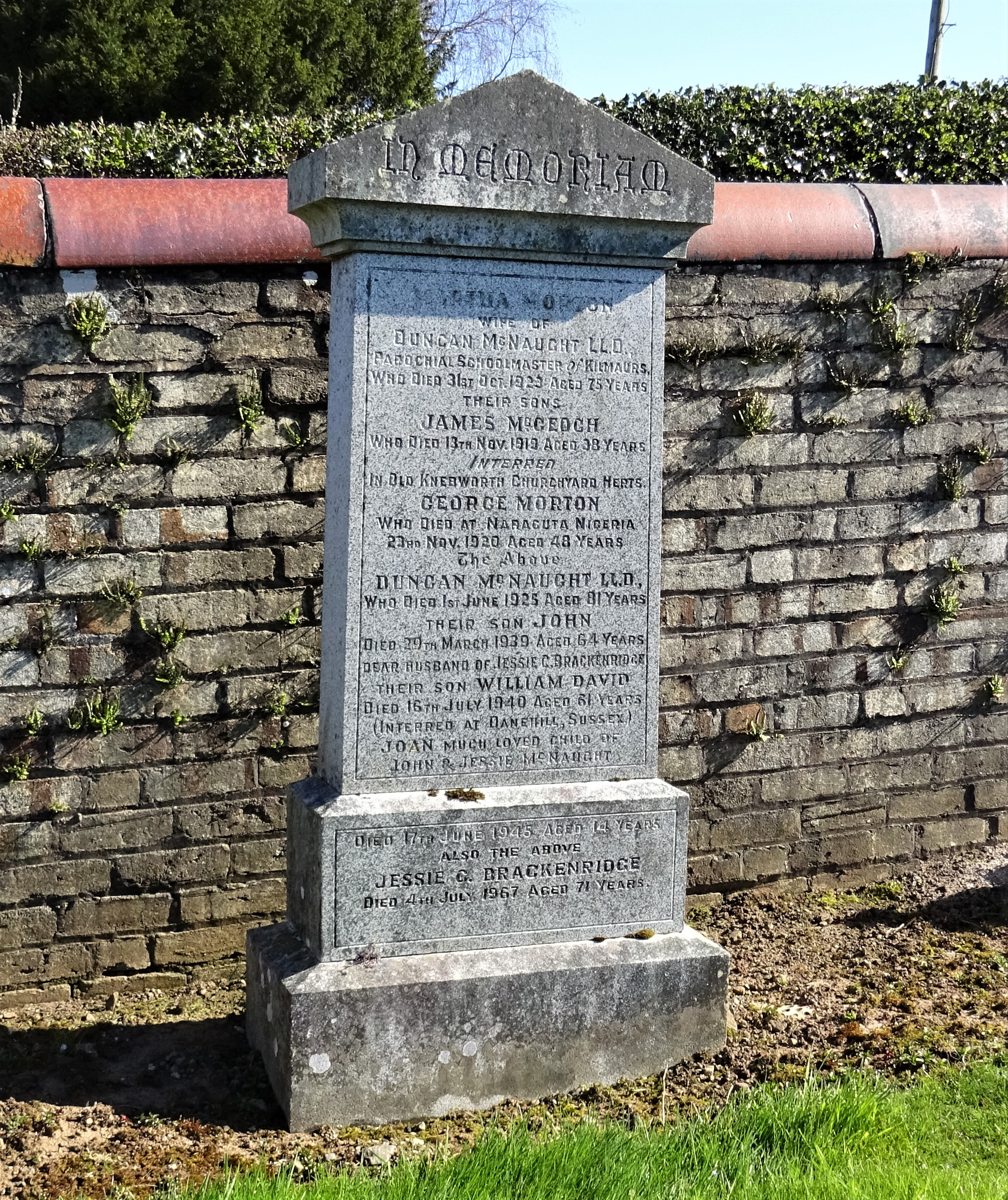
McNaught family memorial, Kilmaurs.

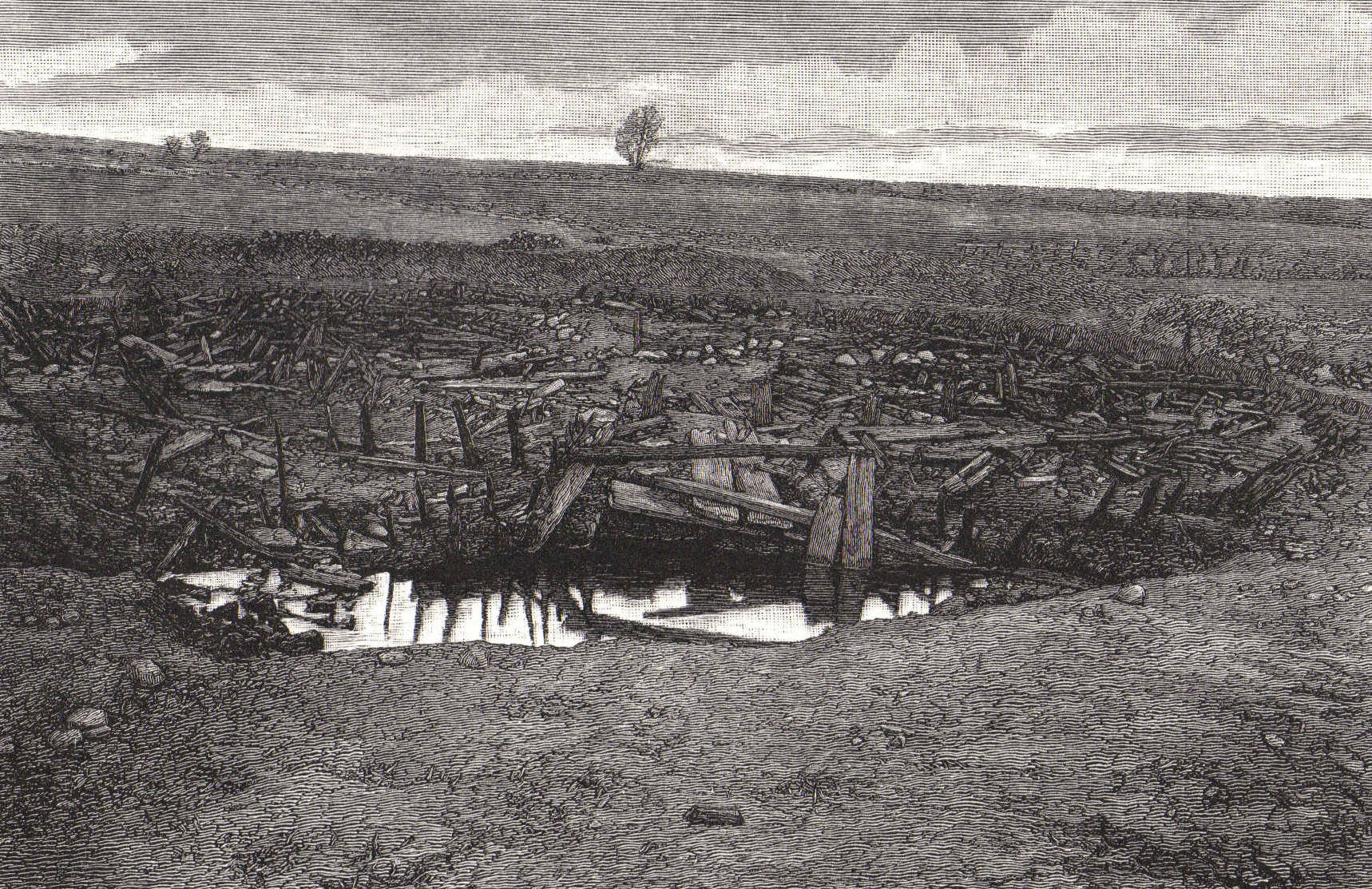
The excavated crannog at Mid-Buiston in 1881.

The funeral of Duncan was on 4 June 1925 and he was buried in the Kilmaurs 'new' churchyard. "Over 200 people attended his funeral with the cortege passing from his house to the graveside. All business in the village was suspended while the funeral was taking place. Shops were closed and their windows shuttered and the blinds of dwelling-houses were drawn. Several flags were flown at half-mast and at a local factory the staff was lined up in front of the building as the funeral procession passed. Little groups of the villagers stood at various points on the route paying homage in respect-full silence to the memory of a well-loved teacher and friend. It was a striking and spontaneous tribute. The Burns Federation was represented by Sir Robert Bruce, LL.D., President; Mr. Alexander Pollock and Mr. J. Taylor Gibb, Vice-Presidents; Mr. Thomas Amos, Hon. Secretary; Major G. A. Innes, Hon. Treasurer; Mr. J. C. Ewing, Editor of the Burns Chronicle; and by members of Burns Clubs at Kilmarnock, Ayr, Dumfries, Glasgow, and Liverpool. A wreath of flowers sent by the Burns Federation was placed upon the grave by the President."

The following are recorded on Duncan and Martha's gravestone in the new cemetery at Kilmaurs : James McGeoch McNaught died on the 13 November 1919 aged 38 and was buried at Old Knebworth Cemetery in Hertfordshire; George Morton McNaught died at Naraguta in Nigeria on 23 Nonember 1920 aged 48; John McNaught died 29 March 1939 aged 64; William David McNaught died on 16 July 1940, aged 61 and was buried at Danehill, Sussex.

A gravestone was erected by Duncan McNaught in the Vale of Leven's Bonhill Cemetery near Alexandria to commemorate various members of his family. His mother, Mary Magraw, Duncan his father, his brothers John and Colin and sisters Agnes and Cecilia are all buried in Bonhill Churchyard. The memorial is ornately decorated; a shield in the roundel above his father's name bears a monogram with a D, an M, and a small c for "Mc".

In 'The Humours of Ayrshire' published by John Aitken, a song is included titled 'Duncan McNaught' with the chorus:

"Duncan McNaught, Duncan McNaught,
Let ilka ane choose his ain draught,
And dring to worth's frien',
And the foe o' whats mean,
The King o' good fellows - Duncan McNaught"

=== Publications ===
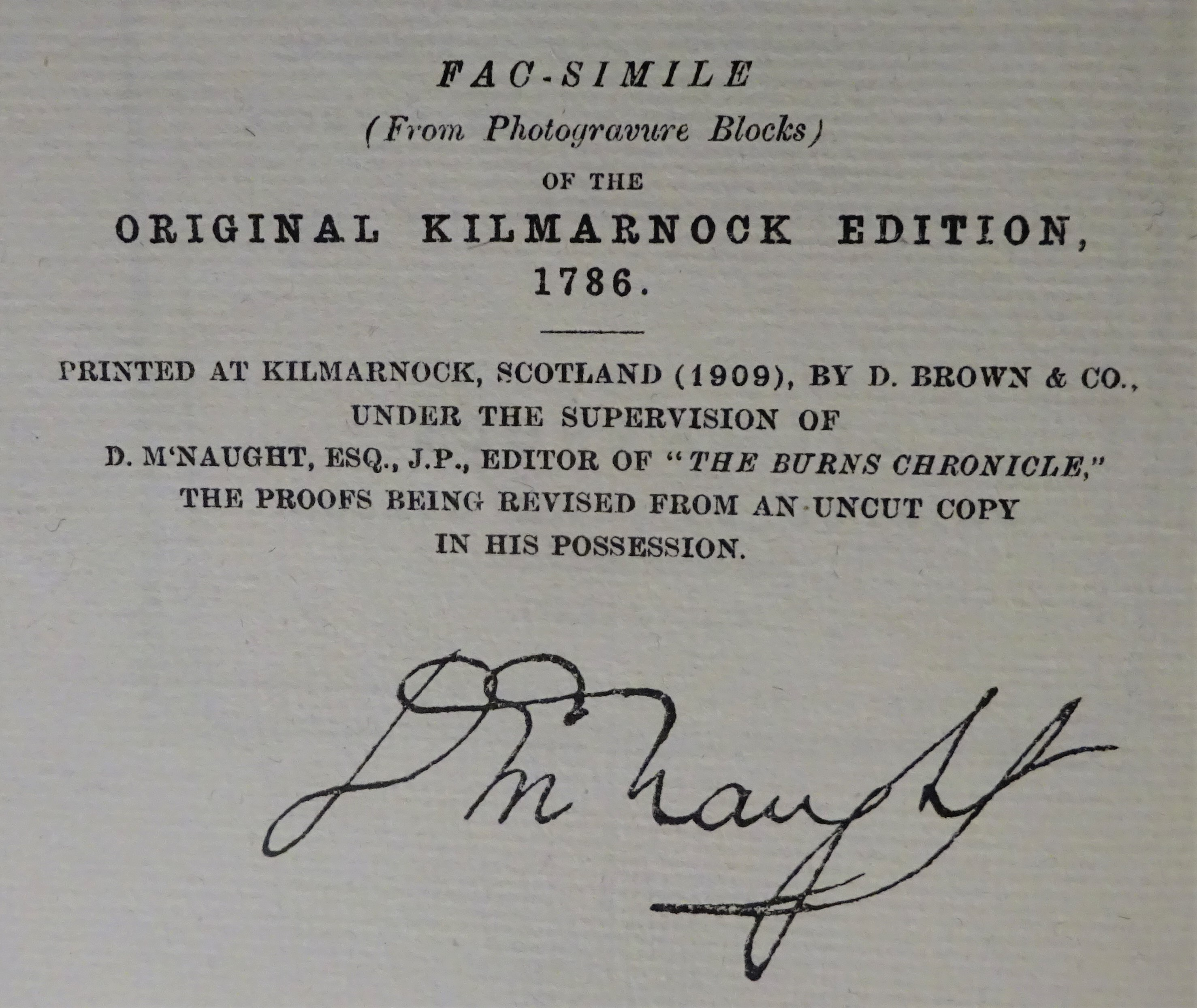
The 1909 Facsimile signed by McNaught whose own copy was used.

Duncan privately printed a volume on "The Charters of Kilmaurs" in 1874 and another more substantial volume on the "Kilmaurs Parish and Burgh" in 1912 that covered history, geology, flora, fauna, etc. with an informative bespoke map. In 1903 he produced a revised edition of "The People's Edition of the Poetical Works of Robert Burns."

In 1909 Duncan supervised the publication of a photogravure facsimile of an uncut copy in his possession of the 'Kilmarnock Edition' of Robert Burns's poems, printed by D. Brown in Kilmarnock (see illustration). In 1911 he edited an edition of Robert Burns's ribald "Merry Muses of Caledonia" under the auspices of the Robert Burns World Federation but did not append his name, instead using the term Vindex as in the term 'vindicator' or simply Editor. 750 copies were officially printed however many more are thought to have been printed in reality. He also published "The Truth About Burns" in 1921 that contained an unpublished letter to James Smith from Robert Burns and an extensive bibliography of the appearances of Burns's poems and notices in contemporary periodicals.

== Association with Robert Burns ==
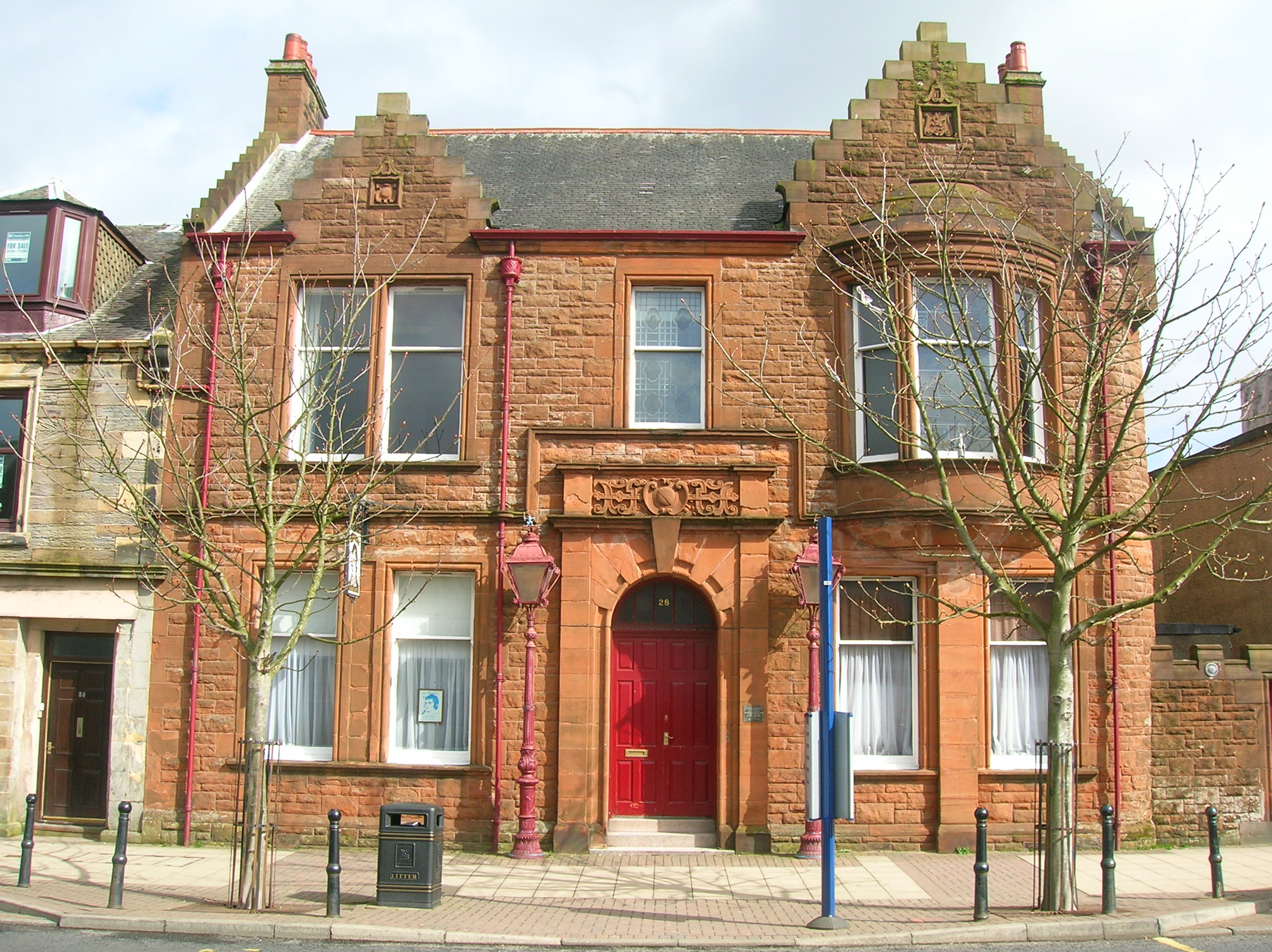
The 'Wellwood' premises of the Irvine Burns Club where Duncan was made an honorary member in 1922.

In 1885, along with Provost David Mackay and Captain David Sneddon he founded at Kilmarnock the "Federation of Burns Clubs", now the Robert Burns World Federation. He was the president for thirteen years, from 1910 to 1923.

He was the editor of the Robert Burns World Federation's 'Burns Chronicle' from 1893 to 1925, thirty-three years. He contributed many articles, including one in 1894 in which he denied the possibility that Burns had been involved in any way with the writing of the Merry Muses although later he was the anonymous editor of an edition published by the Burns Federation. He had very strong opinions on publications that claimed to contain poems written by Burns and even compiled and printed a list for use by Burnsians.

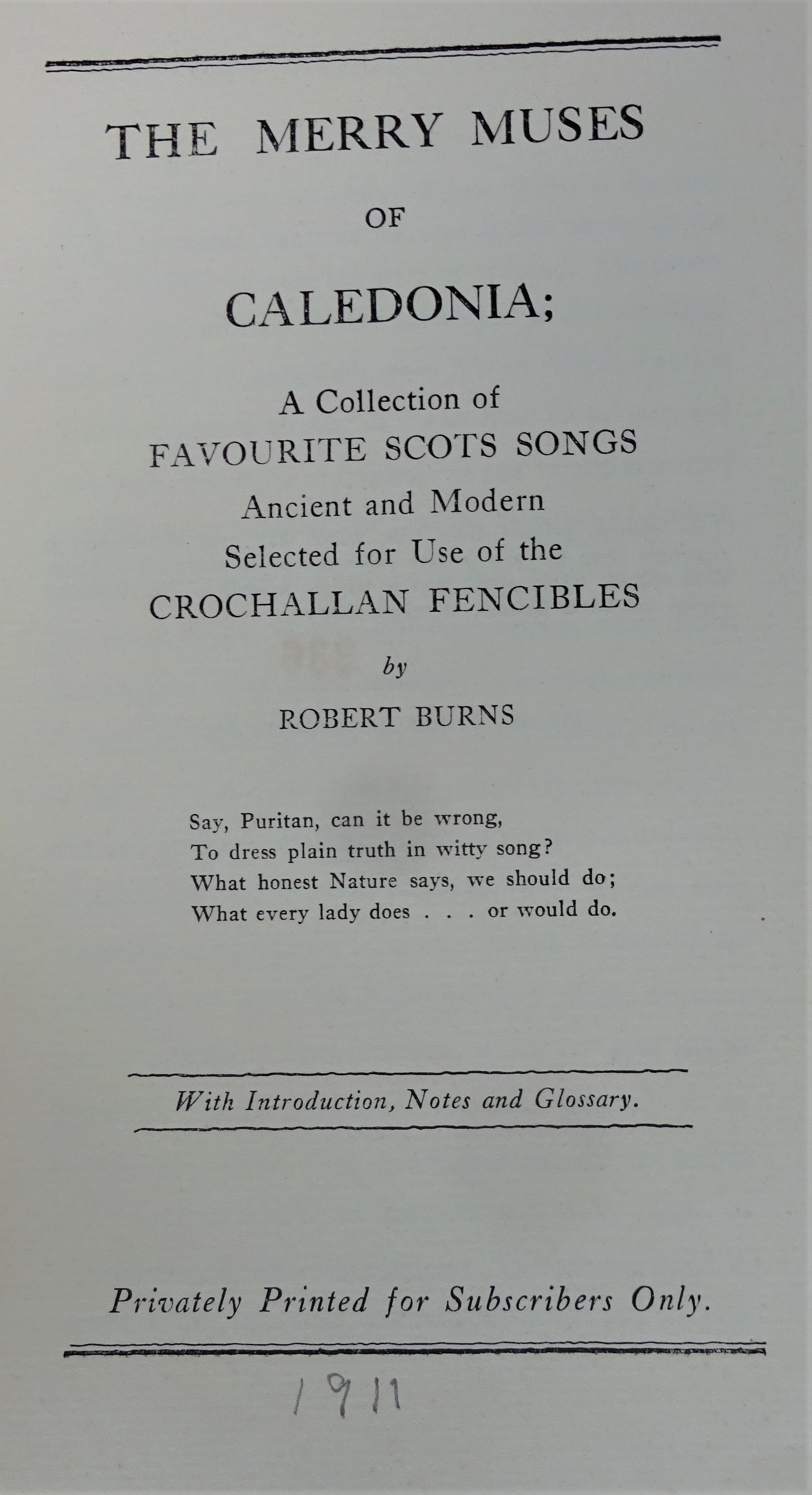
The 1911 Edition of 'The Merry Muses of Caledonia'

Duncan was a member and president of the Kilmarnock '0' Burns Club and in 1922 he was made an honorary member of the Irvine Burns Club.

He had access to, or owned, many Burns letters and manuscript items that provided many new insights that he published as editor in the Burns Chronicle, such as that it had been thought that Elizabeth Paton had given birth in November 1784 to Elizabeth 'Bessie' Burns until Duncan was shown a document drawn up by Gavin Hamilton in 1786 that shows 'Bessie' to have been born on 22 May 1785.

On the day in 1910 of the unveiling of the Robert Burnes memorial at St Columba's Churchyard, the Stewarton Burgh Band marched through the streets and Andrew Kerr, President of the Stewarton Literary Society hosted the proceedings. The whole project had originally begun following a talk delivered by Duncan and the honour was given to him to unveil the memorial.

He not only made a lifelong study of Burns's poems but also was a student of the Ayrshire dialect and was credited by Sir James Wilson who wrote "The Dialect of Robert Burns as spoken in Central Ayrshire".

=== John Gribbel ===
In 1920 the American businessman and antiquarian collector John Gribbel visited Duncan's house at Benrig, Kilmaurs who had been on the 'Scots Committee' that sought to take legal action to return the Glenriddell Manuscripts to Scotland, a task that became null and void when John Gribbel purchased them and gave them to the Scottish people. Duncan presided over the presentation and ceremony at Glasgow's Grand Hotel, 27 July 1920, when John Gribbel was able to visit Scotland.

In July 1920 McNaught presented Gribbel with a copy of the 1909 facsimile edition of the 'Kilmarnock Edition,' the printing of which he had supervised. This copy is now in the Smith College library.

Duncan was acknowledged as one of the world's greatest experts on Robert Burns and had put together what John Gribbel regarded as being the finest and most extensive collection of Burnsiana, artifacts with over 600 publications, owning no less than two copies of the Kilmarnock Edition, an uncut example of his having alone been valued at £1000 in circa 1920. John said that he would not leave Ayrshire without these items and made Duncan an offer that was accepted, the amount unknown, on the understanding that they would be kept together under the name The McNaught Collection.

Sadly when John Gribbel died in 1936 his estate was broken up and 'The McNaught Collection' sold at auction. One copy of his Poems, Chiefly in the Scottish Dialect's is now held by Cornell University and the second is at the University of Delaware. A recent estimate is that only 86 copies survive of the 612 'Kilmarnock Editions' that were printed.

To recognise Gribbel's generosity, the then Burns Federation, arranged for a bespoke album, bound in levant morocco, to be created that featured scenes of Burns's life and poems as well as a historical note outlining the story of the 'Glenriddell Maunuscripts'. McNaught was the president of the 'Album Committee' and the album was presented at a tribute dinner held at Glasgow in 1920.

=== The McNaught Collection ===
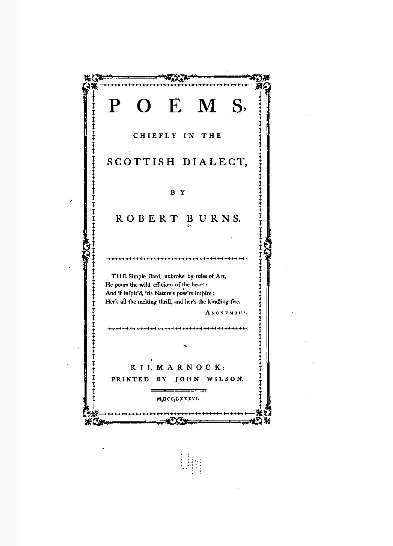
The 1786 Kilmarnock Edition of Burns's Poems

Duncan had one of the finest and largest collections of Burns related items in existence at the time that included "600 volumes, including old magazines from 1780 to 1810, pamphlets and magazines relating to Burns, 20 portraits and engravings of the Poet, a number of superb photographs of scenes in the Burns country; and 65 letters from descendants of Burns, 50 of which were from the grand-daughter, Mrs Sarah Burns Hutchinson, and the remainder from Mrs Burns Scott, Adelaide, Australia, daughter of Mrs Hurchinson and from Colonel James Glencairn Burns. The Collection included the following copies of rare editions, all published during the Poet’s lifetime:- 1st Kilmarnock Edition, 1786 (Uncut), 1st Kilmarnock Edition, 1786 (Cut), 1st Edinburgh Edition with original boards (Uncut), 1st London Edition, with original boards (Uncut), Edinburgh Edition, 1793 (2 vols), Edinburgh Edition, 1794 (Uncut), Edinburgh Edition, 1794 (Cut), 1st Philadelphia Edition, 1788, 1st New York Edition,1788, 1st, 2nd and 3rd Belfast Editions, 1787, 1790 and 1793, 1st, 2nd and 3rd Dublin Editions, 1787, 1789 and 1790, etc. etc."

=== The McKie Collection ===
The James McKie (1816-1891) collection of Burns books, paintings, manuscripts and general Burnsiana grew to become one of the world's largest collections of the bard's published works, with between 600 and 700 volumes and at least one important holograph manuscript. The Kilmarnock Corporation purchased the 'McKie Collection' and it was displayed in the Burns Monument Museum in the 1880s. Following a fire at the Burns Monument Museum it is now housed by East Ayrshire Council Arts and Museums Service and parts of it are viewable online.

=== The 1896 Burns Exhibition ===
The Burns Exhibition of 1896 was held in the galleries of 'The Royal Glasgow Institute of the Fine Arts' in Glasgow and McNaught was a member of the Executive Committee, writing the forward to the 'Memorial Catalogues' section on 'Burns Relics'.

== The Kilmaurs Case ==
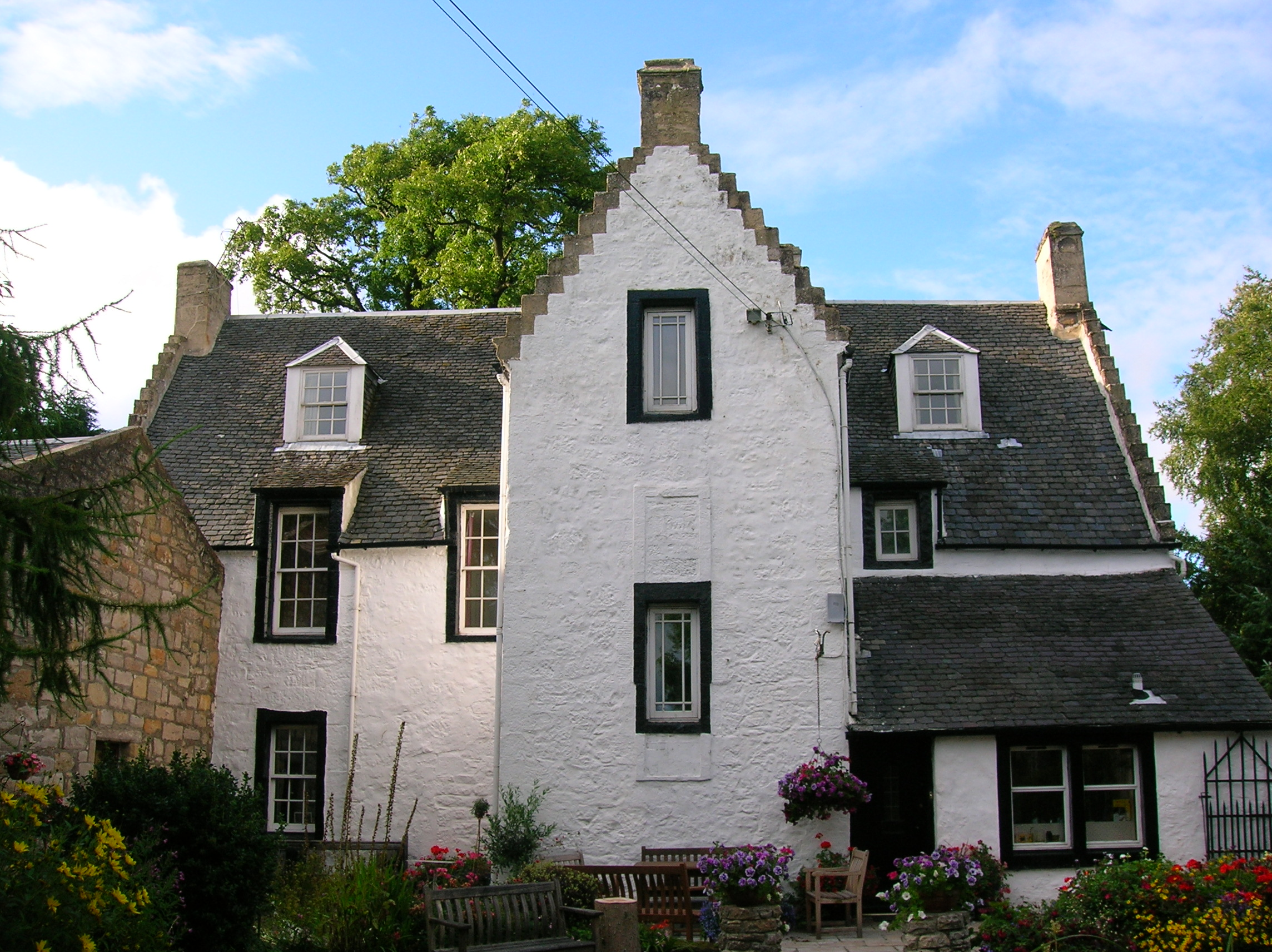
Kilmaurs Place

Duncan figured in the 'Kilmaurs Case' that involved the Reverend Alexander Inglis, minister of Kilmaurs Parish who was accused in 1885 of behaving inappropriately towards Elizabeth Mackie, née Dunlop, the 36 year old wife of the Kilmaurs miller, John Mackie. The events covered the years 1876 to 1884. At first Quarry House near Kilmaurs Mill was the scene of the accusations, however by late 1877 the couple had moved to Kilmaurs Place. Elizabeth informed her husband of the minister's approaches and reluctantly they both wrote letters asking the Rev Inglis not to call upon them and to desist. Eventually John felt it necessary to employ a Mr Alexander Morton, a private detective, and in due course a trap was set with the detective hiding in a press or wardrobe in a room occupied also by Elizabeth, into which the minister entered and upon his inappropriate behaviour taking place the detective revealed himself. The shocked minister threatened suicide and begged for mercy, eventually signing a letter of resignation. Later however the minister denied his inappropriate actions and stated that he had been forced to sign the letter under duress.

The case was placed before the Presbytery of Ayr and the minister was suspended. After due process the Presbytery found him guilty on three counts, however he appealed to the Synod who reversed the decision of the Presbytery, who then took it to the General Assembly of the Church of Scotland and here the minister was found not proven on all counts and he was reinstated.

Duncan and his wife Martha were close friends of the Mackie's and had shared a home on the Isle of Arran for a year. Duncan was a frequent visitor and an unsuccessful attempt was made by the defence to tarnish Elizabeth's name through suggestions that Duncan had acted with impropriety towards her.

== See also ==
- Jean Armour
- Alison Begbie or Elizabeth Gebbie
- Robert Burnes
- Nelly Blair
- May Cameron
- Mary Campbell (Highland Mary)
- Jenny Clow
- Nelly Kilpatrick
- Jessie Lewars
- Ann Park
- Peggy Thompson
