= John Gribbel =

American banker and businessman (1858–1936)

John Gribbell
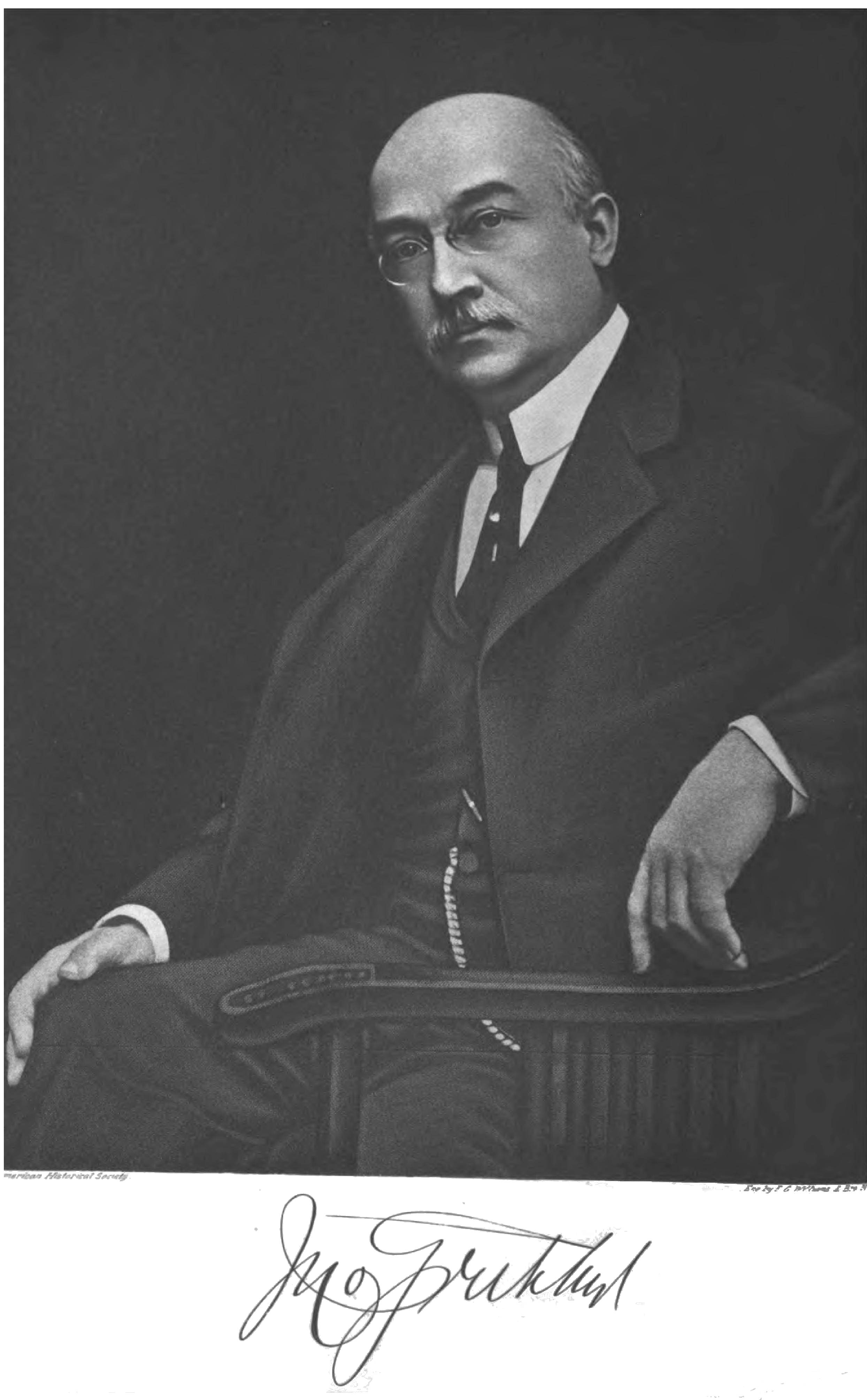
- Born: March 29, 1858; Jersey City, New Jersey, U.S.
- Died: August 25, 1936 (aged 78)
- Resting place: West Laurel Hill Cemetery, Bala Cynwyd, Pennsylvania, U.S.
- Education: City College of New York
- Occupations: banker, manufacturer, gas and electric utilities

John Gribbel (March 29, 1858 – August 25, 1936) was an American banker and businessman. He was president of the American Meter Company, the Fairmount Savings Trust Company, the Royal Electrotype Company, and several gas and electric utilities. He served as a director for numerous banks and businesses including Curtis Publishing Company, Girard National Bank, the Insurance Company of North America, Mechanics National Bank, and Philadelphia National Bank. He invested his fortune in the collection of historical books and manuscripts and donated the Glenriddell Manuscripts to the Scottish people.

== Early life and education ==
John Gribbel was born March 29, 1858, in Hudson City, (now known as Jersey City), New Jersey, the son of James Gribbel, a manufacturer of mining equipment, and Anna West Simmons. Both parents were born in Cornwall, England, and emigrated to the United States in 1838.

After preparatory courses of study, he graduated from the College of the City of New York in 1876.

He received an honorary degree from Hahnemann Medical College, an honorary Master of Arts from Wesleyan University, and an honorary LL.D. degree from Temple University.

== Career ==
He worked at the Importers' and Traders' National Bank and the Leather Manufacturers' Bank in New York City. In 1883, Gribbel moved to Philadelphia as an agent for Harris, Griffin & Company, manufacturers of gas meters. In 1890 the firm was reorganized under the name John J. Griffin & Company, and Gribbel was admitted to a junior partnership. Two years later, Griffin died and Gribbel became sole owner of the business, which continued under the same name and ownership and was notably successful.

In 1907, he co-founded the Fairmount Savings Trust Company along with Israel H. Johnson Jr., and served as president. He was president of the American Meter Company and the Royal Electrotype Company,

He had large investments in gas and electric utilities and was president of Tampa Gas Company, Florida; the Coatesville Gas Company, Pennsylvania; the Helena Gas and Electric Company, Arkansas; the Corpus Christi Electric Company, Texas; and the Athens Gas Company, Georgia. He also served as vice president of the Brooklyn Borough Gas Company. He was a member of the American Gas Institute and the Association of Illuminating Engineers.

He was a director of the Girard National Bank, Mechanics National Bank, the Pennsylvania Sugar Company, the Real Estate Trust Company, the Canadian Meter Company, and the Corpus Christi Railway and Electric Company.

Gribbel became interested in the Curtis Publishing Company, of Philadelphia, of which he became a director, and so had a close business and personal association with Cyrus H. K. Curtis for a long time before they purchased, in partnership, the Public Ledger in 1912. In September 1914, Gribbel severed his connection, resigning the office of vice-president and leaving the management wholly in the hands of Curtis.

He served as president of the Union League of Philadelphia and a member of the University of Arts Club in Philadelphia, the Lotos Club in New York City, the Art Club, City Club, Five O'Clock Club and Bachelors' Barge Club. He was a trustee of Wesleyan University in Middletown, Connecticut, and Centenary Collegiate Institute in Hackettstown, New Jersey. He was a member of the council for the Historical Society of Pennsylvania.

An address about Abraham Lincoln, delivered by Gribbel at the annual dinner of the Union League on February 12, 1915, was later printed and published by the League.

== Historical document collection and the Glenriddell Manuscripts ==
Gribbel built a valuable collection of American Colonial historical documents, autograph letters, and rare books. He gave lectures on these subjects, notably, one on Robert Burns which he delivered before the Historical Society of Pennsylvania.

In December 1913, Gribbel purchased and donated to Scotland under a deed of trust the Glenriddell Manuscripts of the poet Robert Burns. These two volumes, bound in calf, comprise the largest collection of Burns manuscripts in existence, and contain the letters and a selected number of poems which he wrote out and presented to his friend and patron, Robert Riddell of Glenriddell, in 1791. The dedication is considered one of the best pieces, of prose from the poet's hand. When Riddell died, in 1794, the two volumes passed back to "Bonnie Jean," Burns's widow, and were given by her to Dr. Currie to be used by him in connection with the preparation of his edition of the poet's works. In 1853, fifty-seven years after Burns ‘s death, they were placed by the widow of Dr. Currie’s son in the keeping of the Liverpool Athenaeum Library. On the fly-leaf of the volume of letters is pasted the original letter of presentation from Mrs. S. Currie. In the summer of 1913, the trustees of the library sold the volumes to an unknown dealer. Some months afterward, in November 1913, the manuscripts were offered to Gribbel in Philadelphia by a broker, and December 1, 1913, at the annual banquet of the St. Andrew’s Society of Philadelphia, he announced that he had bought them with the purpose of returning them to the people of Scotland.

Gribbel presented them to the Scottish people in perpetual trusteeship. The manuscripts are held at the National Library of Scotland. He received a presentation album by the Robert Burns World Federation in recognition of his generous gift. In 2023, the family of Gribbel gifted the album to the National Library of Scotland.

== Residences ==
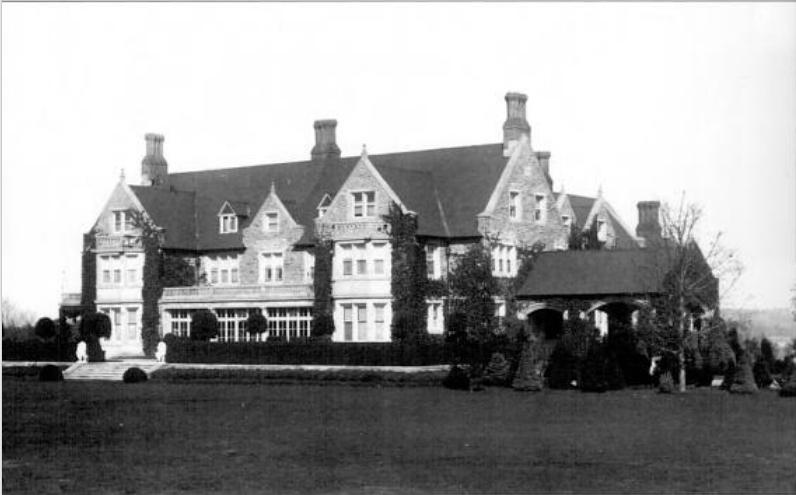
Gribbell built St. Austell Hall as his residence in Wyncote, Pennsylvania

One of Gribbells residences was St. Austel Hall in Wyncote, Pennsylvania, designed by architect Horace Trumbauer and built between 1899 and 1900 by George F. Payne and Company of Philadelphia at a cost of $74,000. The design was based on an English manor named Kelmscott House, which had been owned by William Morris. It was named for St Austell, Cornwall, his mother's former home before immigrating to the United States. The house included a library, billiard room and a built-in pipe organ. It was located on a 42-acre estate. The house was demolished in the 1950s to make way for a housing project.

John Gribbel owned an estate named "Weatherend" on Beauchamp Point in Rockport, Maine.

== Personal life ==
Gribbel married Elizabeth Bancker on January 8, 1880, and together they had four children: Elizabeth Gribbel, Idella L. Gribbel, John B. Gribbel, Wakeman Griffin Gribbel.

Gribbel was a Republican and a member of the Methodist Episcopal Church.

On January 17, 1929, his son, Maj. W. Griffin Gribbel, just released from a sanatorium where he was being treated for shell-shock (PTSD), caused by his experiences in World War I, shot and killed Inspector of Police, John W. Blackburn. Gribbel was himself shot four times but survived. He was charged with first-degree murder and the case went to trial in February 1930. Gribbel was acquitted by a Philadelphia jury, two days later, on the grounds of insanity.

John Gribbel died August 25, 1936, at his home in Camden, Maine, and was interred in West Laurel Hill Cemetery in Bala Cynwyd, Pennsylvania.
