= Robert Riddell =

Captain Robert Riddell (1755–1794), Laird of Friars Carse, near Dumfries.

A friend of Robert Burns, who made him a collection of his poems which later became famous, and wrote a poem 'Sonnet On The Death Of Robert Riddell' in memory of him when he died.

== The Glenriddell Manuscripts ==
The Glenriddell Manuscripts, an important autograph text of two volumes, one containing more than 50 poems, and the other 27 letters by Burns, were written for Riddell between 1791 and 1793. The poet's friendship with the Riddell family ended suddenly in December 1793 as the result of a mysterious drunken incident at Friars Carse, the estate owned by Riddell in Nithsdale. Burns asked successfully for the return of the poetry volume which had already been given to Riddell; the second had not been completed. The Glenriddell Manuscripts are now in the possession of the National Library of Scotland.

== The Interleaved Scots Musical Museum ==
Robert Burns produced the Interleaved Scots Musical Museum for Robert Riddell, consisting of four volumes of James Johnson collection of Scots songs with his personal notes added.

== A Collection of Scotch Galwegian and Border Tunes ==
Riddell was the author of "A Collection of Scotch, Galwegian and Border Tunes", a collection of music mostly from the western Border country, which was published posthumously. While the title page describes the music as "for the violin and pianoforte", many of the tunes have the characteristic idiom, 9-note range and mixolydian mode of music for the Border pipes, and is a very late source for the music of this instrument. Riddell points out that 'the tunes were collected in various parts of Scotland, and on the Borders ... and chiefly wrote from performers, who could not write or read music'. There are significant parallels between several of the tunes, and those in the Peacock collection of music for Northumbrian smallpipes. Some of his variants differ principally in the title, so Peacock's "I saw my love come passing by me" appears here with minor changes as "The Drunken Wives of Carlisle". Other variants are much more distinct – Riddell's variation set on "Cut and Dry Dolly" is very different from Peacock's, though they do have material in common. Some minor differences are significant – Peacock's "Johnnie stays long at the Fair", and Riddell's "Willie stays lang at the Fair" are melodically very similar, but Peacock's version is an adaptation to Northumbrian pipes, while Riddell's makes more sense on Border pipes. Comparison of the two suggests that Peacock adapted a tune from Border pipes to Northumbrian pipes, making some melodic changes to fit the instrument.

== See also ==
- Ellisland Farm, Dumfries
