= James Johnson (engraver) =

British engraver, born 1753

James Johnson (bapt. 1753 – 26 February 1811) was a Scottish engraver, publisher and music seller known for his connection with the songbook The Scots Musical Museum and the poet Robert Burns.

== Life ==
Johnson was born in the Ettrick Valley, the third of four children to Bessie Bleck and James Johnstan, a herdsman.

He may have been trained to become an engraver under James Reed of Edinburgh. He was a prolific engraver of music and made the plates for over half the music printed in Scotland from 1772 to 1790. His early engravings were done on copper and included Six Canzones for Two Voices (1772), A Collection of Favourite Scots Tunes … by the Late Mr Chs McLean and other Eminent Masters (c1772) and Twenty Minuets (1773) by Daniel Dow.

In 1786 he became burgess of Edinburgh.

On 2 July 1791 he married Charlotte Grant, daughter of the writer Lauchlan Grant. They had a son, James, baptised on 13 September 1792, who appears not to have survived to his majority.

He opened a music shop, Johnson & Co., in 1790 in the Lawnmarket in Edinburgh which was continued after his death until 1815 as Johnson & Anderson by his apprentice John Anderson.

He died in Edinburgh on 26 February 1811 and a public appeal was made for support for his widow in March 1819.

== The Scots Musical Museum ==
Johnson had a plan for a two-volume collection of Scottish, Irish and English songs, when he met Robert Burns. The nature of the project then changed: its scope was restricted to Scottish songs, and the number of volumes rose to six, produced from 1787 to 1803. The success of the conception was not matched by financial security for Johnson. Burns contributed 184 pieces; some were original, including many of his best-known lyrics, and others were alterations of or derived from old ballads. Prefaces to some of the volumes were by Burns, who in effect edited the work. Johnson tried pewter plates to cut down the production costs. Burns produced an interleaved version of the Museum of the first four volumes for Robert Riddell.

== Notes ==
Attribution:

- This article incorporates text from a publication now in the public domain: Lee, Sidney, ed. (1892). "Johnson, James (d.1811)". Dictionary of National Biography. Vol. 30. London: Smith, Elder & Co.
