= Liverpool Athenaeum =

Private member club in Liverpool, England

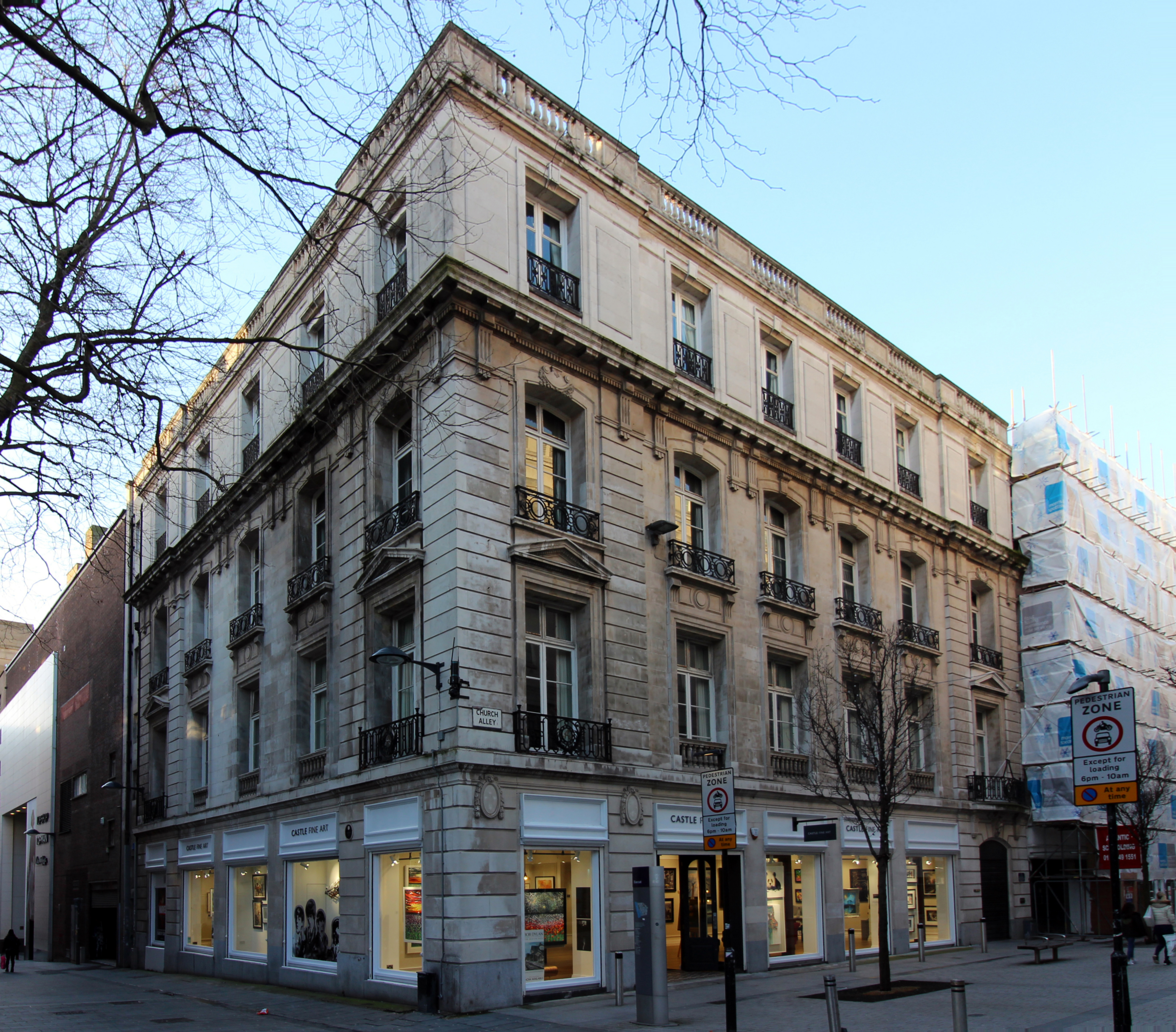
- Liverpool Athenaeum seen from Bluecoat Chambers

- Location within Liverpool

General information
- Location: Church Alley, Liverpool, England
- Coordinates: 53.4046°N 2.9839°W
- Completed: 1924
- Owner: The Athenaeum

Design and construction
- Architect: Harold Dod

Website
- theathenaeum.org.uk

The Athenaeum is a private members club in Liverpool, England. The club was founded to ensure the up-to-date provision of newspapers and pamphlets, and to create a library for the use of the merchants and professional men in the city. The original building was demolished, and replaced by a new building nearby, in 1924. The members of the club are known as Proprietors, because they subscribe to a share, and they include both men and women. The building contains a large library, and it is also used by the Proprietors for social functions. It can be hired for use by outside individuals and organisations.

== History ==
The club was founded on 22 November 1797. Towards this date, Liverpool had been growing rapidly as a commercial centre. The merchants and other professionals in the city needed a supply of up-to-date news. This was usually provided by newspapers and periodicals in coffee houses, but these were frequently overcrowded. There was also a need for a library because the existing library, founded in 1758, was not considered to be adequate. The founders of the club produced a prospectus entitled Outlines of a Plan for a Library and Newsroom, which proposed "to procure a regular supply of newspapers, both town and country, all the periodical publications of any value, and all the pamphlets that have reference to subjects of local or general polity or commerce". This required subscribers to shares in the 'Institution' and hence the names 'Proprietor' are used rather than 'club' and 'member'; all 'members' on joining still sign the original Share Register and the limited number of 500 means that all members can trace their predecessors in this. The founder subscribers commissioned the local architect John Foster Sr to design a building for them in Church Street. This opened on 1 January 1799, and its library opened on 1 May 1800. The early members of the club included "entrepreneurs, slavery-abolitionists, free-thinkers, and political radicals, who regarded themselves as the commercial and intellectual champions of Liverpool".

At this time there were gentlemen's clubs in London, but these were more political in nature, or were institutions for gambling. The opening of the Liverpool Athenaeum preceded the club of the same name in London by 27 years. The members of the Liverpool club arranged for express riders, messengers, and the regular coaches serving the city, to bring them all the latest news, information, and ideas. In addition to books, the library gathered a collection that included navigation charts, maps and globes. It also obtained items from the private library of one of its founder members, William Roscoe. In time the library grew into "one of the world's most highly regarded private literary collections".

The members are known as Proprietors. Notable Proprietors have included, in addition to William Roscoe, Sir John Gladstone and Lord Edward Smith-Stanley; William Duncan, the first Medical Officer for Health in Britain, Sir Ronald Ross, winner of the Nobel Prize in Physiology or Medicine in 1902, Sir Charles Sherrington, joint winner of the same award in 1932, the local architect Sir James Picton, and the Rt Revd Francis Chavasse, the second Bishop of Liverpool. In the 1920s, the Corporation of Liverpool decided to widen Church Street to accommodate a new tram system, and this involved the demolition of the club's building. A new building for the club was constructed in Church Alley, between Church Street and School Lane, and was opened in 1924.

== Architecture and contents ==
The club occupies three storeys above a row of shops, owned by the club, in Church Alley. Designed by Harold Dod, its architectural style is described as "Chaste American classicism, with a strong French accent". The ground floor entrance has a keystone depicting the head of the Greek goddess Athena. Inside the entrance, an elliptical staircase leads up to the club's premises. The largest rooms are the Newsroom, the Dining Room, and the Library, and in addition there are smaller meeting rooms. The Library is on the second floor, and is decorated in Greek Revival style. It has a shallow segmental vaulted ceiling, and contains three bays that are separated by pairs of columns. In the Library are three large paintings by Edward Halliday depicting events in Greek mythology involving Athena.

== Present day ==
The Athenaeum continues to function as a club, and its Proprietors include men and women. The membership is limited to 500 people. There is a grade of associate membership for certain categories of people, including retired people aged over 60, and those living more than 25 miles from the club. New Proprietors have to be proposed and seconded by existing Proprietors before they are interviewed and elected by the Committee; admission involves signing the Share Register. The Library contains over 60,000 items, which include books, maps and charts, drawings of Liverpool buildings in the 19th century, and pencil sketches of former Liverpool personalities. The club is open for the use of Proprietors each weekday. A social programme is arranged, including dinners and other meals with speakers. There are special interest groups for history, literature, music, and for wine tasting. The building may be hired for use by Proprietors, or by outside individuals and groups. Both the Library and the Newsroom are licensed for civil ceremonies.

The library holds a yearly Writer-in-Residence competition with a £1,000 prize, the 2012 recipient was 17-year-old, Liverpool Blue Coat School student Lara Rimmer.

== Gallery ==
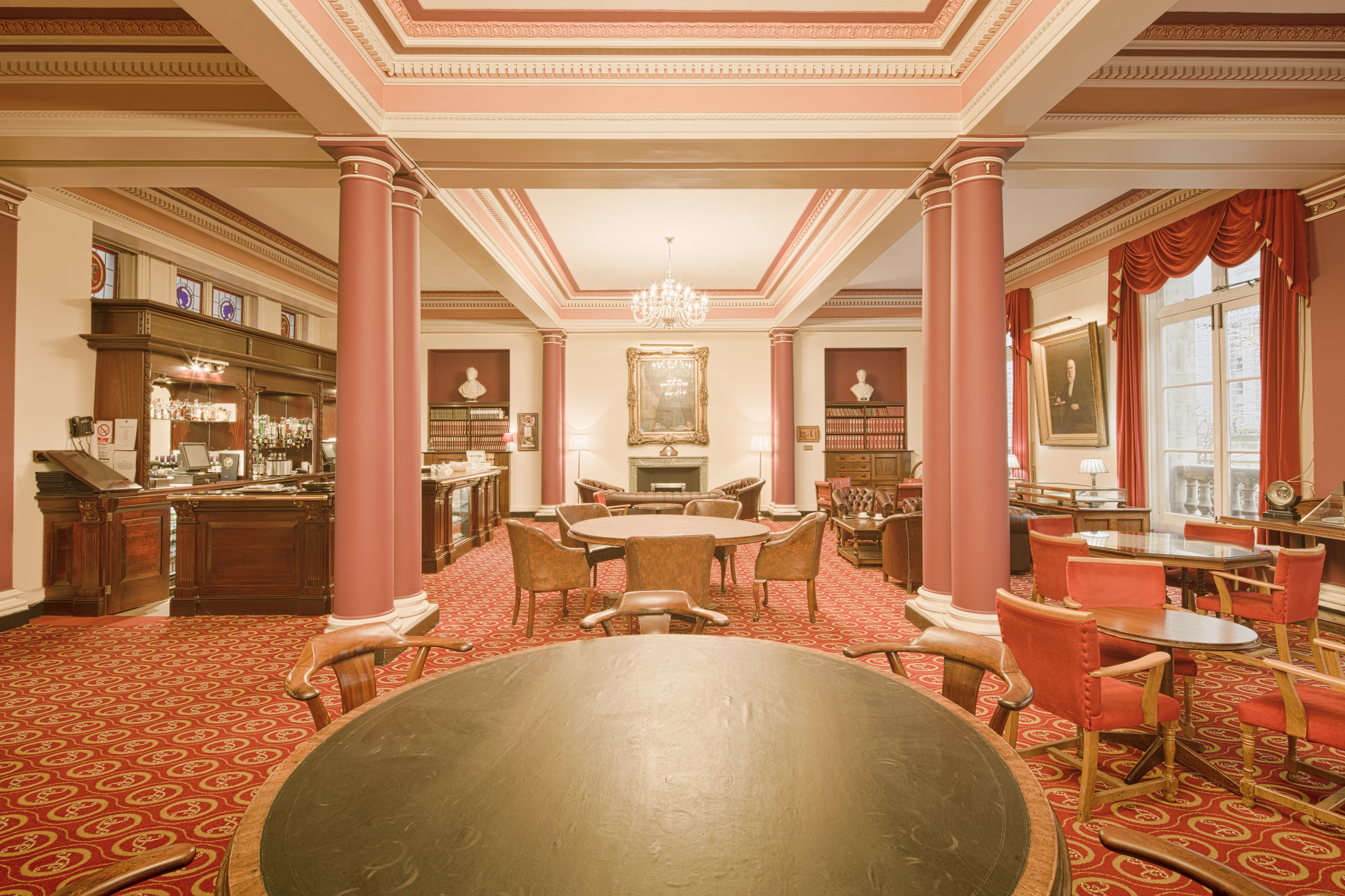
The News Room

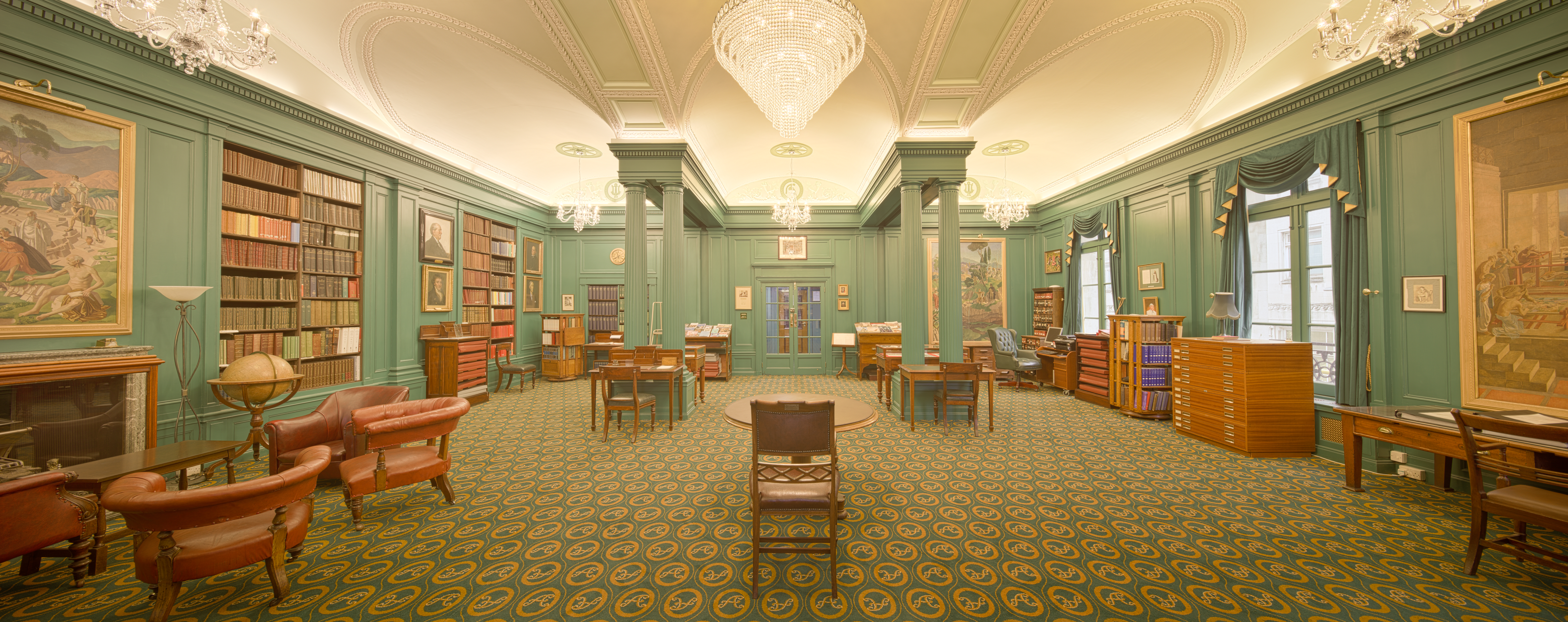
The Library

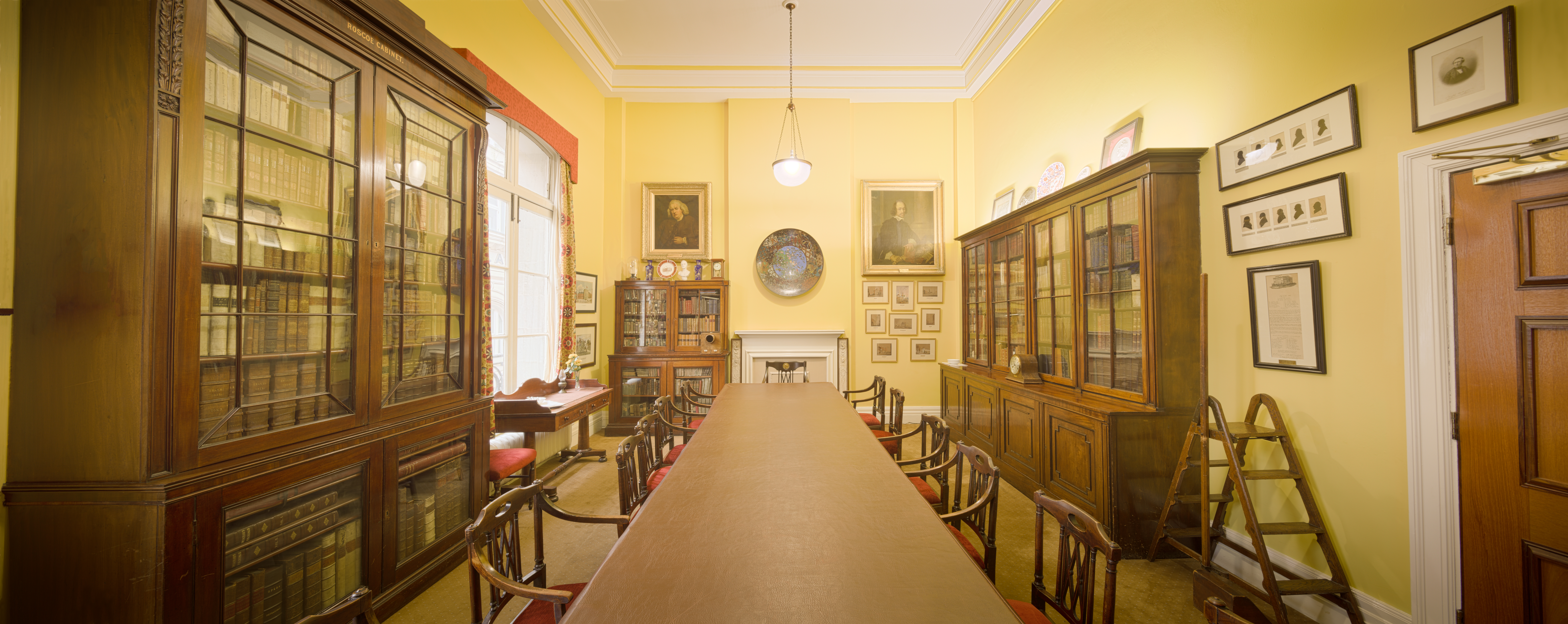
The Committee Room

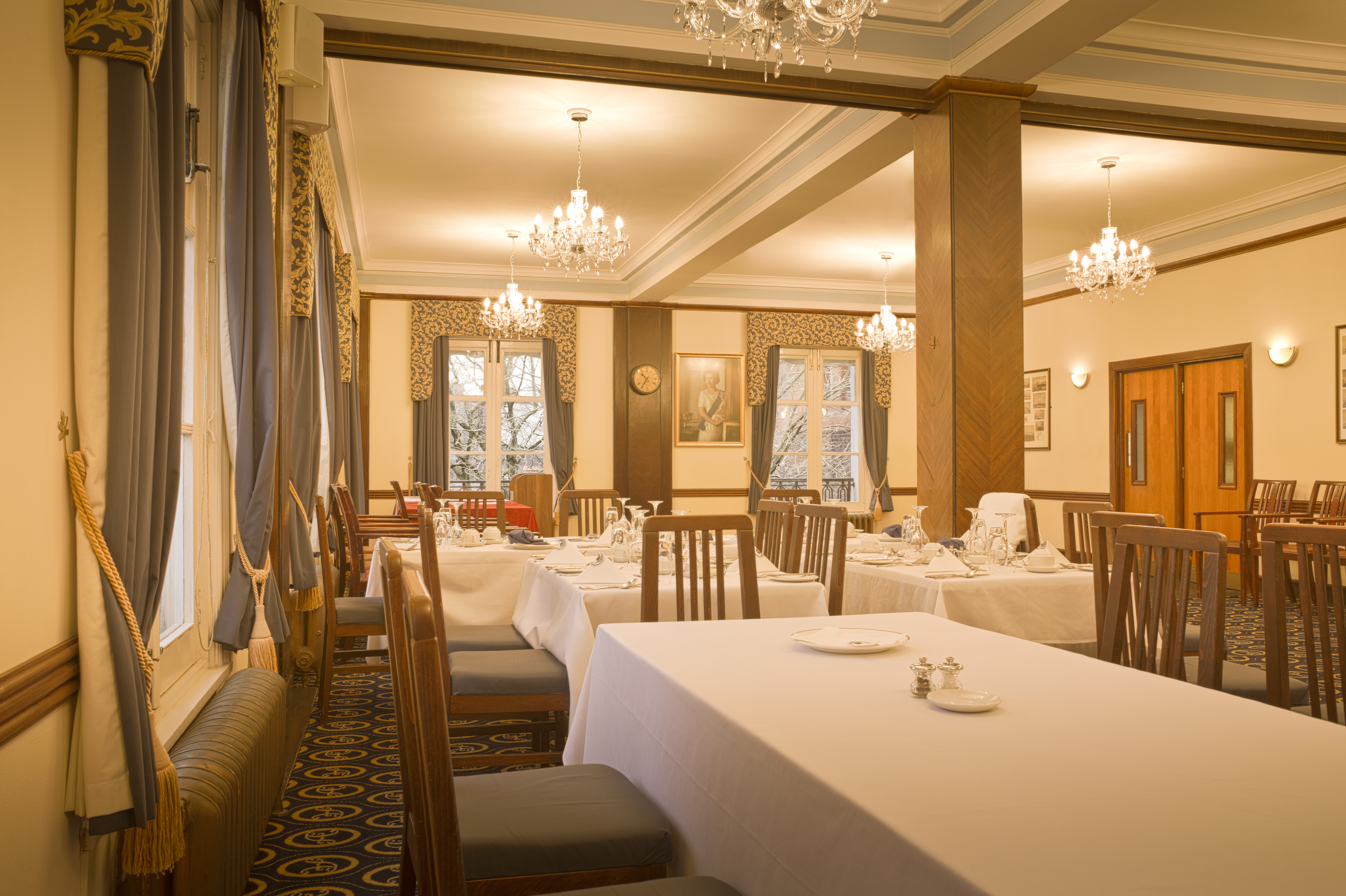
The Dining Room

== See also ==
- List of libraries in Liverpool
