= Diocese (disambiguation) =

Term Diocese may refer to:

- Roman diocese, administrative unit from the period of late Roman Empire.
- Diocese, ecclesiastical unit of various Christian churches.

== See also ==
- Archbishop (disambiguation)
- Bishop (disambiguation)
- Vicar (disambiguation)
- Exarch (disambiguation)
