= The Geddes Burns =

Copy of Burns's published poems with extra pages and poems in the poet's own hand

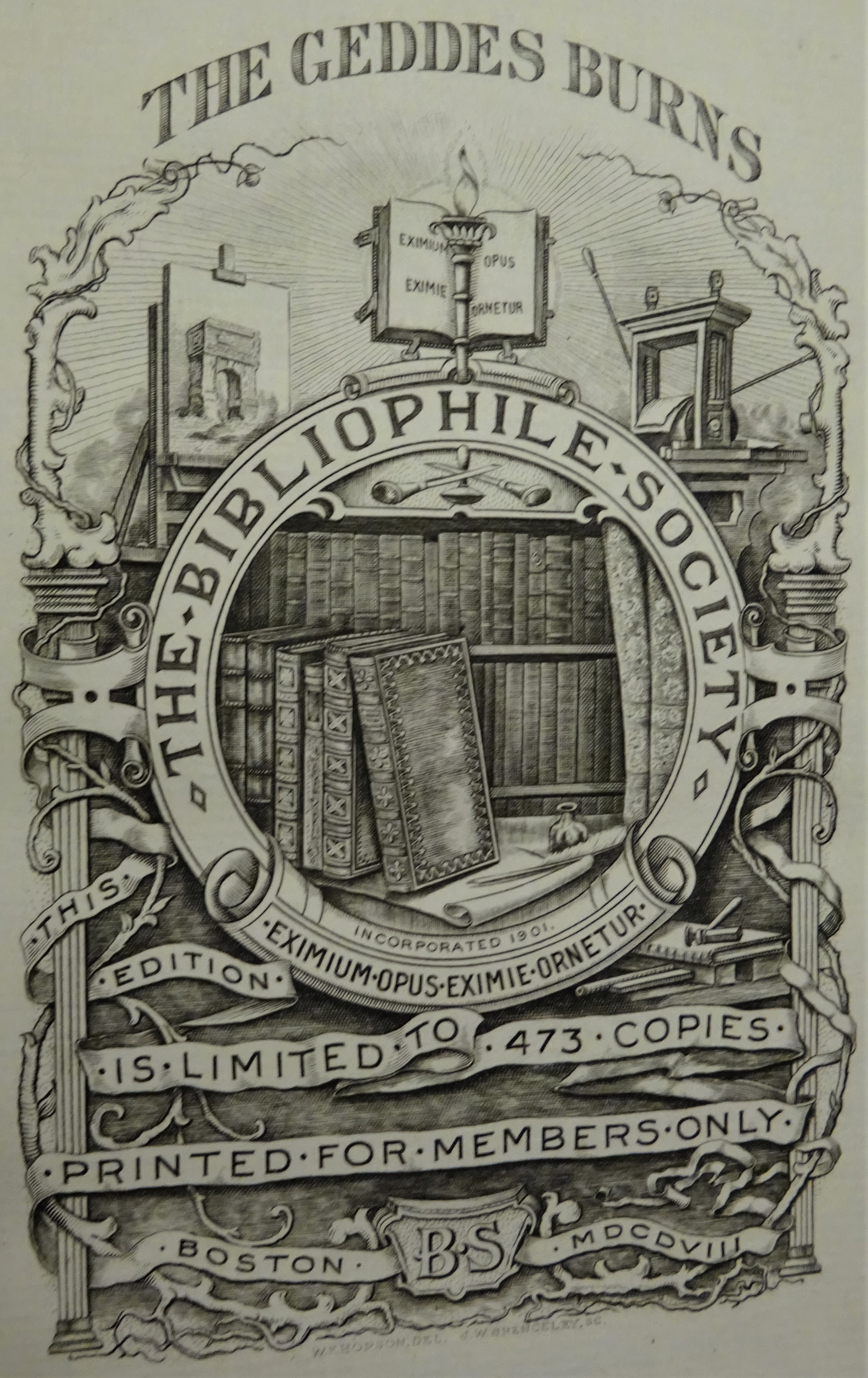
- Title page of The Geddes Burns 1908 facsimile
- Author: Robert Burns
- Original title: Poems, Chiefly in the Scottish Dialect (Edinburgh Edition)
- Language: Scots
- Genre: Songs and Poems
- Publisher: William Creech
- Publication place: Great Britain

The Geddes Burns is a copy of Robert Burns's 1787 Poems, Chiefly in the Scottish Dialect (Edinburgh Edition) with twenty-seven extra pages with twelve poems and songs in Burns's handwriting bound in, and a letter to Catholic Bishop John Geddes from the poet, written at Ellisland Farm.

== Bishop John Geddes ==
Fr. John Geddes (1735–1799) was the son of a farmer and was born at Mains of Corriedoun, Banffshire on August 29, 1735. He is said to have been the elder brother of the biblical critic Dr Alexander Geddes, who died in 1802 and is buried at St Mary's, Paddington. He had another brother, David Geddes, who had a daughter named Margaret.

After being ordained as a Roman Catholic priest, Fr. Geddes served as Rector of the Royal Scots College at Valladolid.

Geddes eventually rose to become coadjutor to Bishop Hay and then the Vicar Apostolic of the Lowland District of the illegal and underground Catholic Church in Scotland, but was never the Bishop of Dunkeld as is often reported. In 1780 he was however ordained Bishop of the Moroccan Titular See of Marocco in partibus infidelium.

A man of great learning and charisma, Bishop Geddes was described by Burns as "the first" (meaning "foremost") "cleric character I ever saw." Henry Goadby states that John Geddes died in London at his sister's home, however he actually died in Aberdeen and is buried there.

== Association with Robert Burns ==
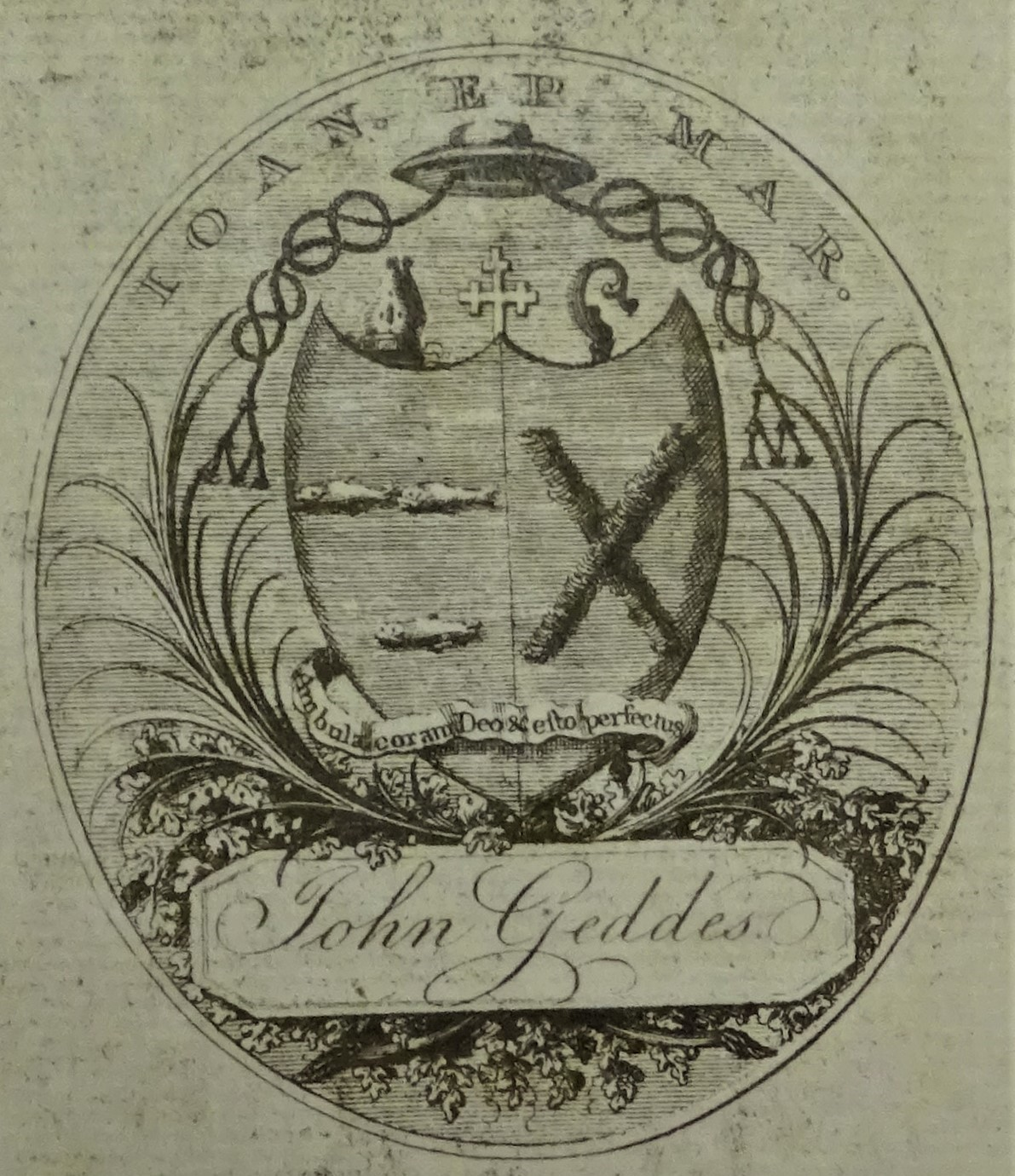
Bishop Gedde's bookplate from The Geddes Burns.

Burns first met Geddes during the winter of 1786/87 at the Edinburgh home of Lord Monboddo when the Bishop was living in the city. The "Venerable Father" of Burns's correspondence took an active interest in his literary works and considered that Burns was “A Man of Uncommon Genius.” Their friendship was evidently built on a mutual respect.

Geddes was not a formal subscriber to Poems, Chiefly in the Scottish Dialect (Edinburgh Edition), but he was responsible for the subscriptions by five Catholic Seminaries, such as the aforementioned Scots College at Valladolid where he had once been Rector.

== The Geddes Burns ==
Burns borrowed Geddes's own copy of his 1787 Edinburgh Edition to accompany him on his Highland Tour (August - September 1787), but failed to return it for almost two years. Writing to Geddes from Ellisland on 3 February 1789, the poet apologised for having kept the volume for so long: "You will see in your book, which I beg your pardon for detaining so long, that I have been turning my lyre on the banks of the Nith. Some larger poetic plans that are floating in my imagination, or partly put in execution, I shall impart to you when I have the pleasure of meeting with you..." Only four of the poems had been composed whilst on the tour, the others being composed at Ellisland although some of these were influenced by events on the tour.

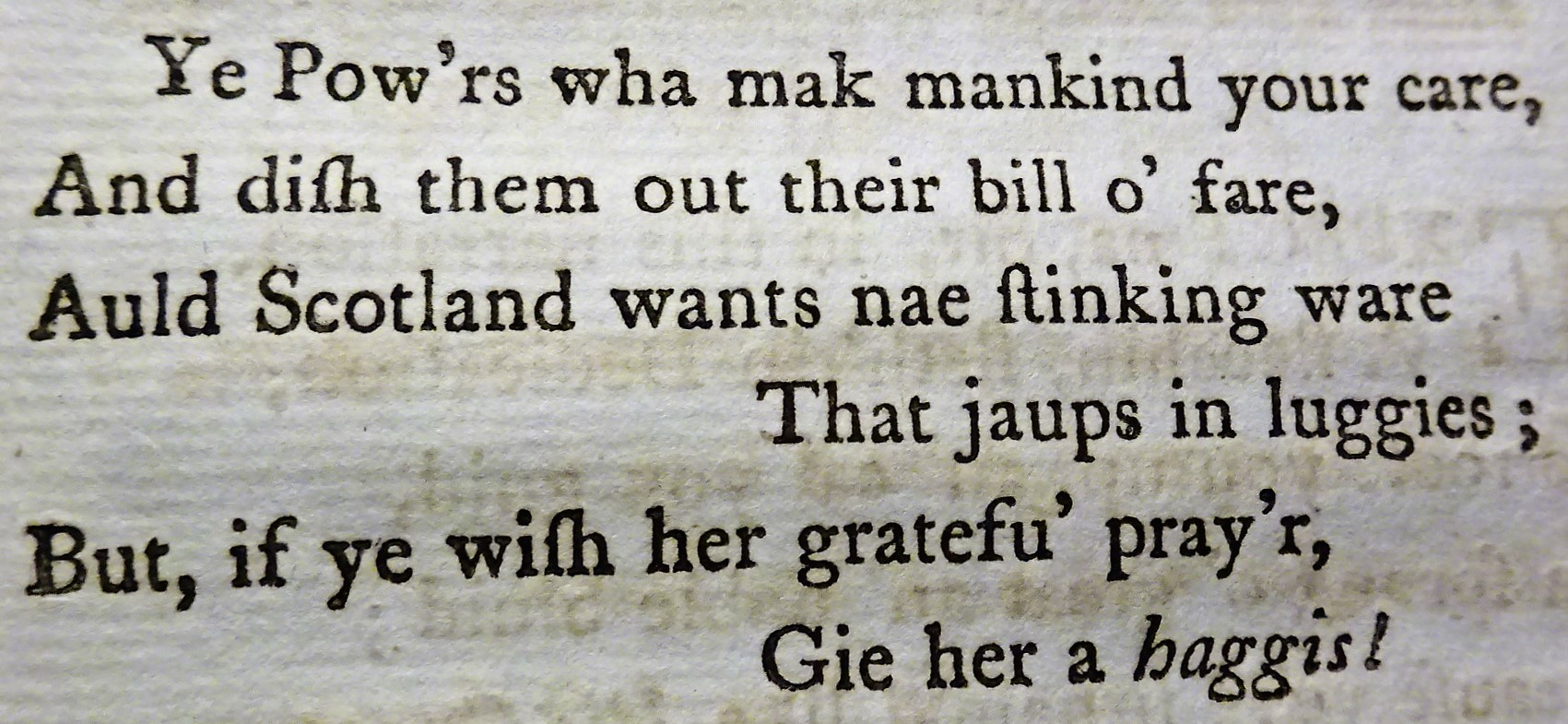
The 'Stinking' edition of Burns's 1787 Edinburgh Edition.

Geddes had sent his volume, a 'Skinking Version,' to a book binder who had rebound it in calf leather and also added extra pages, eighteen at the front were written on by Burns and nine also were written in holograph by Burns at the back of the printed pages.

The 3 February 1789 letter from Burns to Bishop John Geddes was stitched into the volume at the front. It was addressed to The Reverend Mr. Geddes. Care of Dr Gregory - St Johns Street. Edinr. Wt. a book This letter had a section at the end cut out, supposedly by Geddes as he disapproved of the "severely sarcastic" content. This also removed the text on the reverse side. The words removed are within the brackets: "I gave up my transient connexion [with the merely Great,] those self-important beings whose intrinsic [worthlessness is con]cealed under the accidental advantages of their [rank, I cannot lose the] patronising notice of the Learned and the [Good without the bittere]st regret. [I have the] honour to be, Venerable Sir, your most respect[ful] [and ver]y humble servant, Robt Burns."

The printed section of 'Burns's' poems followed a protocol personal and many place names were given a degree of anonymity by replacing most letters with asterisks, however to assist the bishop, Burns wrote in the missing letters and he also provides extra details such as the real name of 'Doctor Hornbook' being 'John Wilson Schoolmaster, Tarbolton'. After the 'Lord President Dundas' poem he added a note:

"The foregoing poem has some tolerable lines in it, but the incurable wound of my pride will not suffer me to correct, or even peruse it. I send a copy of it, with my best prose letter, to the son of the great man, the theme of the piece, by the hand, too, of one of the noblest men in God's world, Alexander Wood, surgeon, when behold, his solicitorship took no more notice of my poem or me than had I been a strolling fiddler, who had made free with his lady's name over the head of a silly new reel! Did the gentleman think I looked for any dirty gratuity?"

Burns added an extra verse to 'Tam Samson's Elegy' on page 152 and indicated the position it should be placed in the reading order:

There, low he lies, in lasting rest;
Perhaps upon his mould’ring breast
Some spitefu’ muirfowl bigs her nest
To hatch an’ breed:
Alas! nae mair he'll them molest!

Tam Samson's Deid!

== Provenance of The Geddes Burns ==
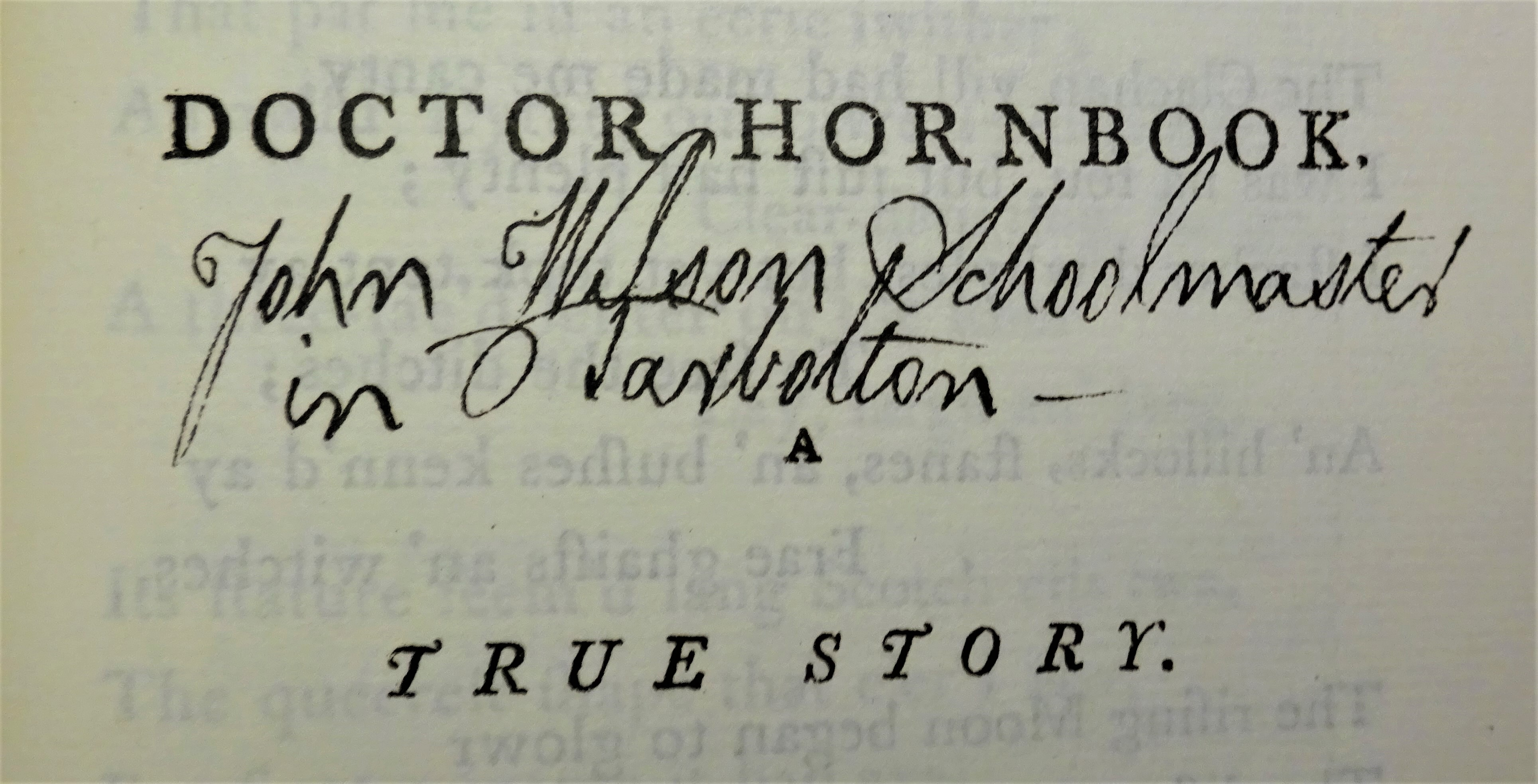
Dr Hornbook identified for Geddes.

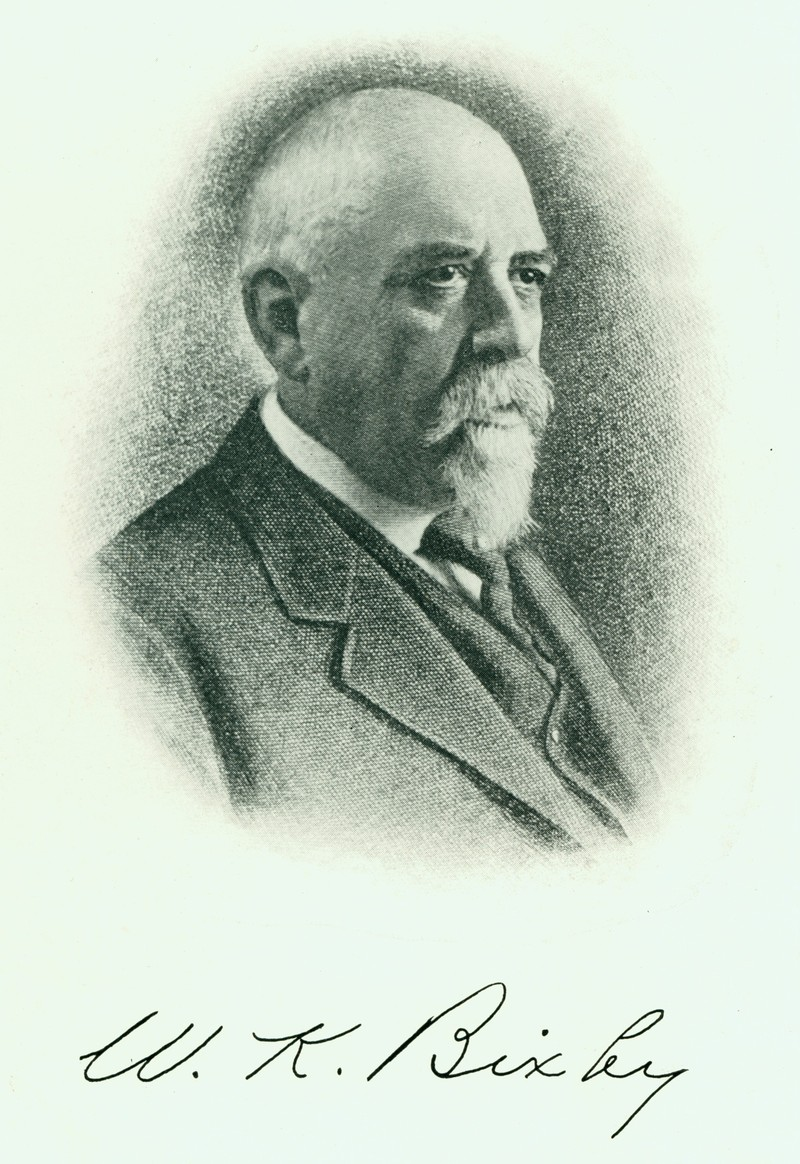
William K. Bixby

Alexander Geddes died at Finsbury Square in London whilst on a visit to his niece Margaret, who had married John Hyslop, a Scottish surgeon. On the Hyslop's death, John's book passed to their daughter Margaret Hyslop, who gave it to an 'intimate' friend, the English anatomist, Dr Henry Goadby in 1838 upon his departure from England for America. These details are recorded in Goadby's own handwriting on a previously blank page at the back of the book: “The late John Hyslop, Esq., late of Finsbury Square, London, Surgeon, married Margaret Geddes, the niece of Bishop John Geddes and his younger brother, Alexander. Late in life the Bishop visited London and stayed at his niece’s home in Finsbury Square, where he felt sick and died. His book came into Mrs Hyslop’s possession, and after the decease of her husband and herself, reverted to their daughter Margaret from whom I received it in 1838. Henry Goadby.”

James Black from Nairn, then resident in Detroit, had become friendly with Dr Henry Goadby thanks to an introduction by a Dr Cowan and purchased 'The Geddes Burn' in 1863 from the Doctor's widow after a long drawn out period of correspondence and in total twenty years in the family's possession. Goadby had written a book "Text Book of Vegetable and Animal Physiology" that had not proven popular enough to cover the costs involved and this financial insecurity led to the sale of The Geddes Burns. The book and Burns's letter to Geddes then passed into the hands of the wealthy American collector and Burns enthusiast William K. Bixby, President of the Burns Club of St Louis.

William Bixby exhibited his original copy of 'The Geddes Burns' at the Burns Cottage at the Louisiana Purchase Exposition in 1904.

John Geddes’ original volume, complete with the letter and the handwritten work of Burns, now resides in San Marino at the Henry E Huntington Library & Art Gallery in California. The Huntingdon Library also has sixteen of Robert Burns's letters.

== Detail of the additional poems in The Geddes Burns ==
Twelve songs and poems were added in Burns's own holograph.

=== On the front pages ===
1. On reading in a Newspaper the death of John McLeod, Esq.r, brother to Miss Isabella McLeod, a particular friend of the author’s.

2. On the death of Sir J. Hunter Blair.

3. Written on the blank leaf of a copy of my first Edition, which I presented to an old sweetheart, then married. – I was then on the tiptoe for Jamaica.

4. Epitaph on a friend.

5. The humble petition of Bruar Water to the noble Duke of Atholl.

6. Epistle wrote in the commencement of my Poetical career, to Mr. McAdam of Craigengillan, in answer to an oblidging letter he sent me.

7. On the death of Rob't Dundas of Arniston, Esq., late Lord President of the Court of Session.

8. On scaring some waterfowl in Loch Turit, a wild Scene among the Hills by Oughtertyre.

9. Written in the Hermitage at Taymouth.

10. Written at the Fall of Fyers.

=== On the end pages ===
11.a. Written in Friars’ Carse Hermitage on the banks of Nith - June - 1788.

11.b. Altered from the foregoing - Dec - 1788.

12. To Robert Graham of Fintry, Esquire - accompanying a request.

Burns then wrote: “The foregoing three poems are the favor of the Nithsdale Muses”

== The facsimile ==
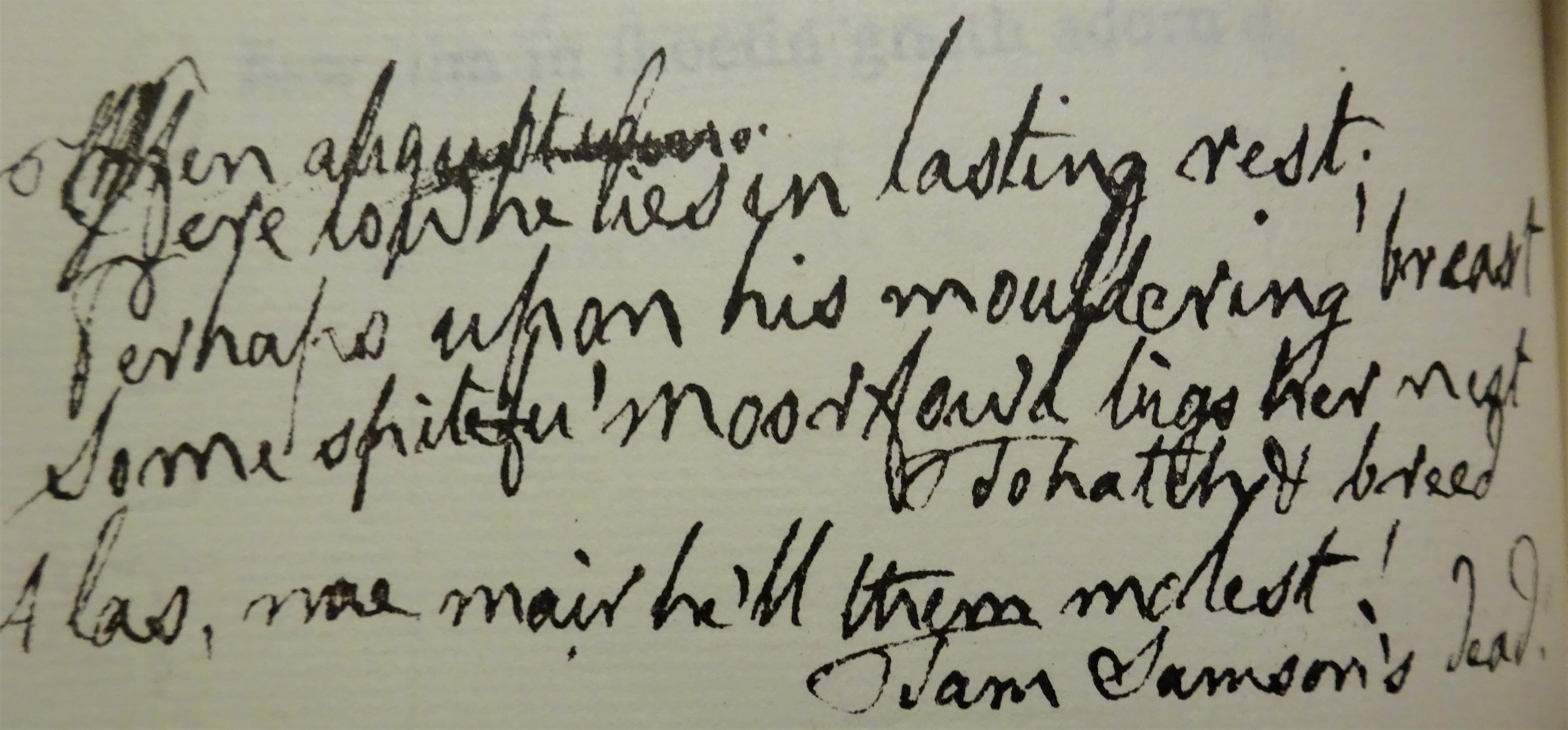
The extra verse added to 'Tam Samson's Elegy'.

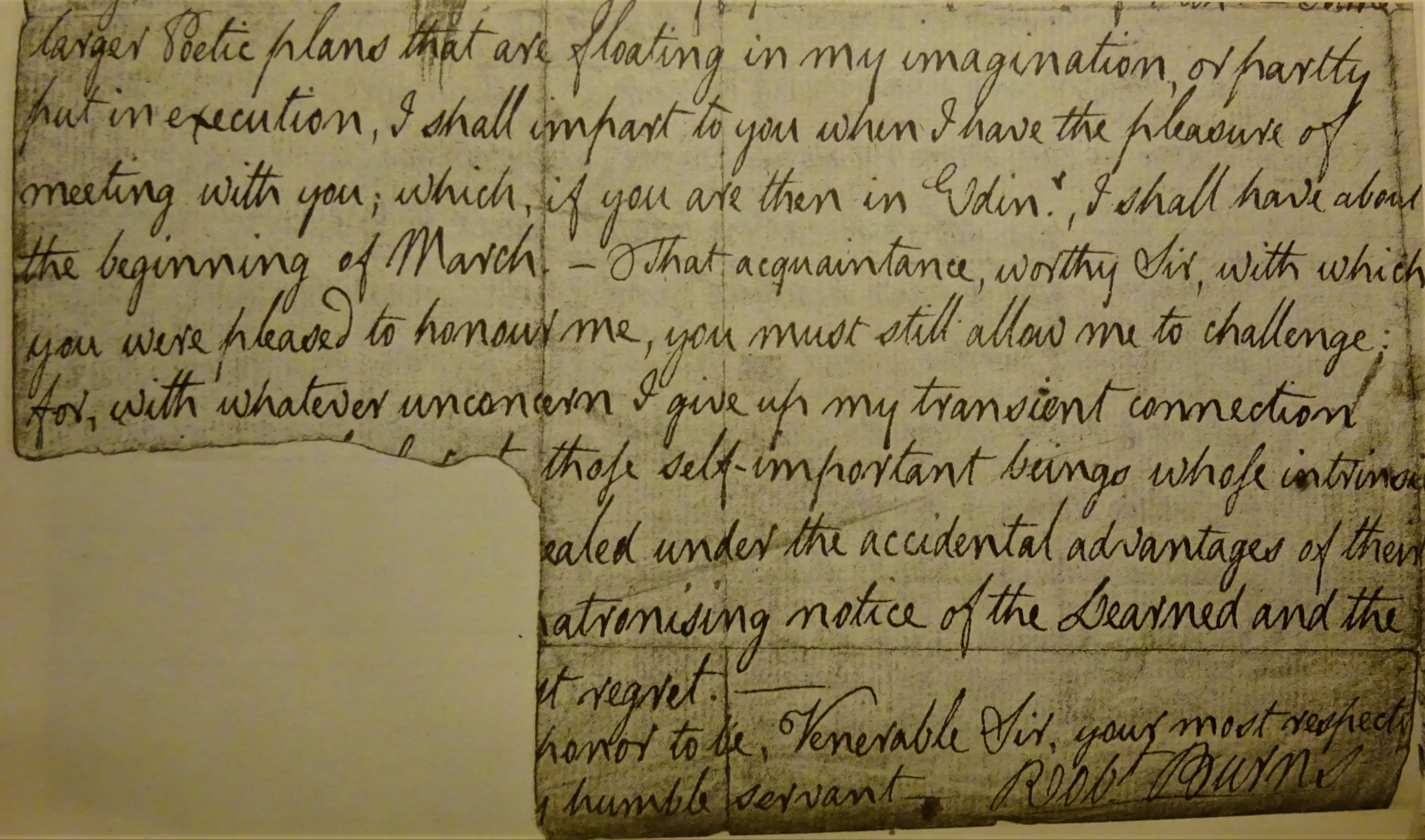
1789 letter from Robert Burns to Bishop John Geddes. Section cut out by the bishop.

In 1908, Bixby had The Geddes Burns photographed and ‘reproduced by the lithographic and gelatine process’ in a limited octavo edition of 473 copies bound in full calf leather with gilt ruling and lettering, all enclosed in a double slip case with a label on the exterior spine. Bixby made an error in the book by incorrectly attributing the original ownership to Bishop Alexander Geddes instead of his brother, Bishop John Geddes. The error is located in the introductory section where James Black's lecture to the Burns Club of Michigan on 1 May 1867 is recorded.

The Copies of Burns's handwritten text folded into the Facsimile Editions which were printed on hand made paper with 'line and chain' markings selected and specially made to have the same thickness and texture of the original paper. The watermarks are 'BIBLIOPHILE SOCIETY' and 'MADE IN HOLLAND' and the paper was uncut and unopened when issued. In reality the paper was much thinner with the 1787 volume being 3 cm thick whilst 'The Geddes Burns' with its extra pages is 2 cm thick.

The 473 copies were, as detailed on the facsimile's title page, distributed only to the members of the 'Bibliophile Society of Boston', also known as 'The Club of Odd Volumes.' This was a Gentlemen's Club in which Members, some well known, such as Winston Churchill and Franklin D. Roosevelt, were referred to as “His Oddship ……….”

James Currie had published Burns's letter to Geddes, with some errors, in his biography of the poet.

== See also ==
- A Manual of Religious Belief
- Poems, Chiefly in the Scottish Dialect (Edinburgh Edition)
- Poems, Chiefly in the Scottish Dialect (Second Edinburgh Edition)
- Poems, Chiefly in the Scottish Dialect (London Edition)
- Glenriddell Manuscripts
- Robert Burns's Commonplace Book 1783–1785
- Robert Burns World Federation
- Burns Clubs
