= Poems, Chiefly in the Scottish Dialect (Edinburgh Edition) =

1787 collection of poems by Robert Burns

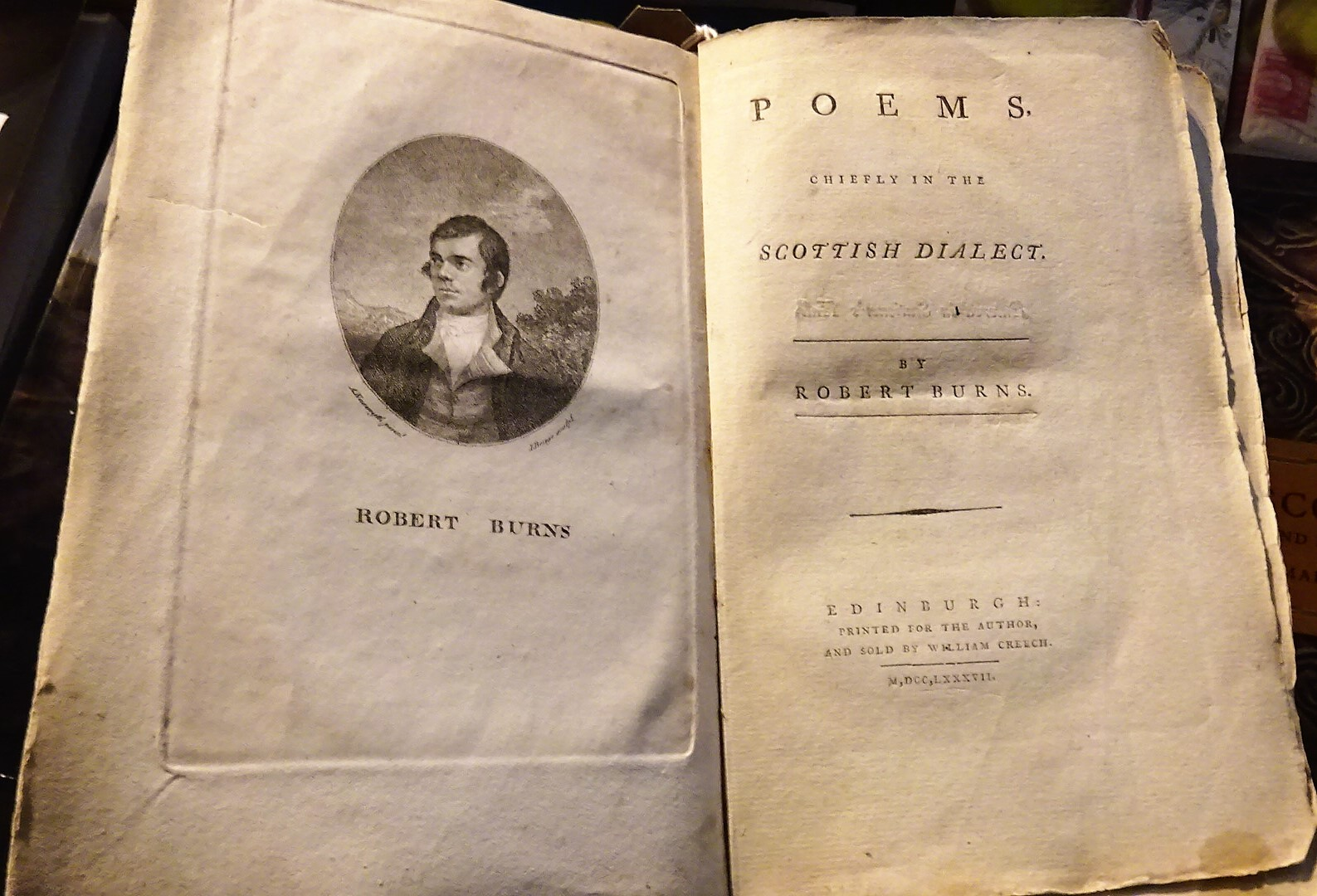
- Frontispiece and title page of the Edinburgh Edition
- Author: Robert Burns
- Cover artist: Alexander Nasmyth
- Language: Scots and English
- Genre: Poetry and lyrics
- Publisher: William Creech of Edinburgh
- Publication date: 1787
- Publication place: Great Britain

The Edinburgh Edition is the name given to the second edition of Robert Burns's Poems, Chiefly in the Scottish Dialect, published in Edinburgh on 17 April 1787. It followed the Kilmarnock Edition of 1786.

== The Edition and its contents ==
It was the second published edition of Burns's work, his first edition having been printed nine months before in Kilmarnock. It cost 5 shillings for subscribers and 6 shillings for non-subscribers. The printing of 1500 copies had been initially planned however demand was such that circa 3000 copies were printed, with estimates ranging from 2,894 to 3,250, and 1500 subscribers for 2876 copies are listed, however Burns lost some of the Subscription Bills "and perhaps some have been mislaid", resulting in a need to sell some copies at the subscribers price. By comparison only 612 copies of the Kilmarnock Edition of which 88 are known to survive however no record exists of the number of the first Edinburgh Edition that are extant. Cairney states that local tradition in Kilmarnock has it that an extra six were printed for Burns as "author's copies", making 618 in total.

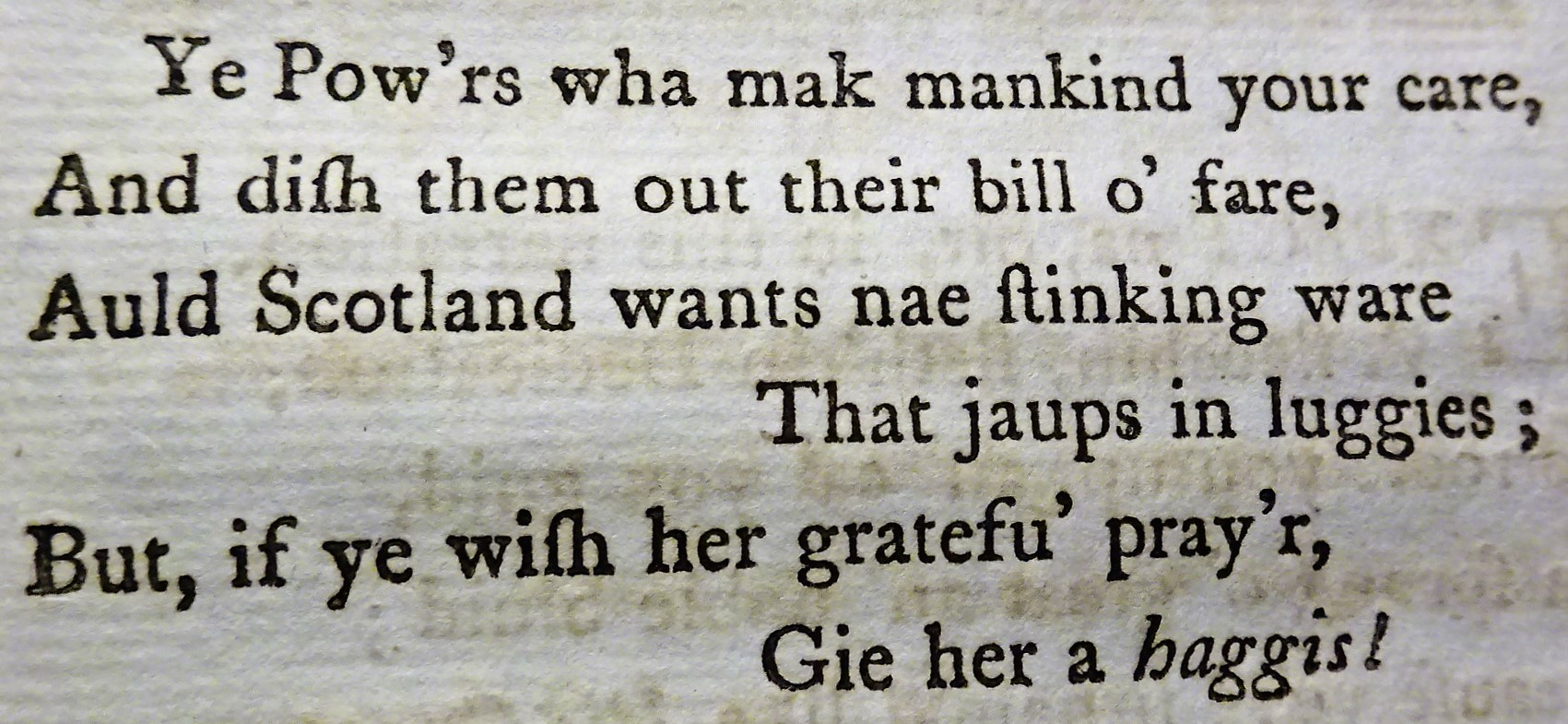
The "stinking" error in the poem "To a Haggis"

The volume was dedicated to the "Noblemen and Gentlemen of the Caledonian Hunt". The 1787 Edinburgh edition contained an extra seventeen poems and five new songs. In addition most of the poems present in the 1786 Kilmarnock Edition are reprinted, except for three, with almost no deliberate changes. 1786 material included such favourites as "Halloween", "The Twa Dogs", "The Cotter's Saturday Night", "To a Mouse", etc. New poems included "Death and Doctor Hornbrook", "The Brigs of Ayr", "The Holy Fair", "John Barleycorn", "Address to the Unco Guid, or the Rigidly Righteous" and significantly "To a Haggis" (often given elsewhere as "Address to a Haggis"). Of the seven new songs, "Green Grow the Rashes: A Fragment" is an example of Burns's gift for re-working traditional folk-verse.

Ross notes that "The peculiar feature of the 1786 edition is the an, et and 't endings ... probably on Creech's advice he abolished the older endings in his edition of 1787, substituting in' or ing for an and it for et."

Nearly twice the length of the Kilmarnock Edition of 1786, it was printed in octavo format, measuring 22.3 x 14.3 cm, untrimmed, had 343 pages, a 38-page subscribers list and an expanded 24-page glossary or dictionary of Scots words for those unfamiliar with the language, with an added emphasis on the national language rather than the dialect of Burns's native Kyle. Interestingly the word "skinking" is not included in the glossary. For reasons unknown a few words from the original glossary were omitted from the expanded versions, such as "taet", meaning a small quantity.

Changes were present within the poems themselves: for example, "The Vision" had seven extra stanzas not present in the 1786 Kilmarnock Edition, meaning that four further "worthies" were given a mention.

Burns was personally responsibility for the cost of the subscription list and its increased length added around 11% to his costs.

It was first published and then bound by Mr Scott in French gray paper printers' boards, with most copies subsequently being cut and ornately bound once purchased so that uncut copies in the original paper wrappers with a cream paper spine and label are exceedingly rare, especially those of the "Stinking Edition". No perfect unbound copies of the Kilmarnock Edition survive, however due to the extra rarity value of the original binding, attempts have been made to produce "fake" copies with their paper wrappers, labels, etc. The watermark fleuron is a classic fleur-de-lis.

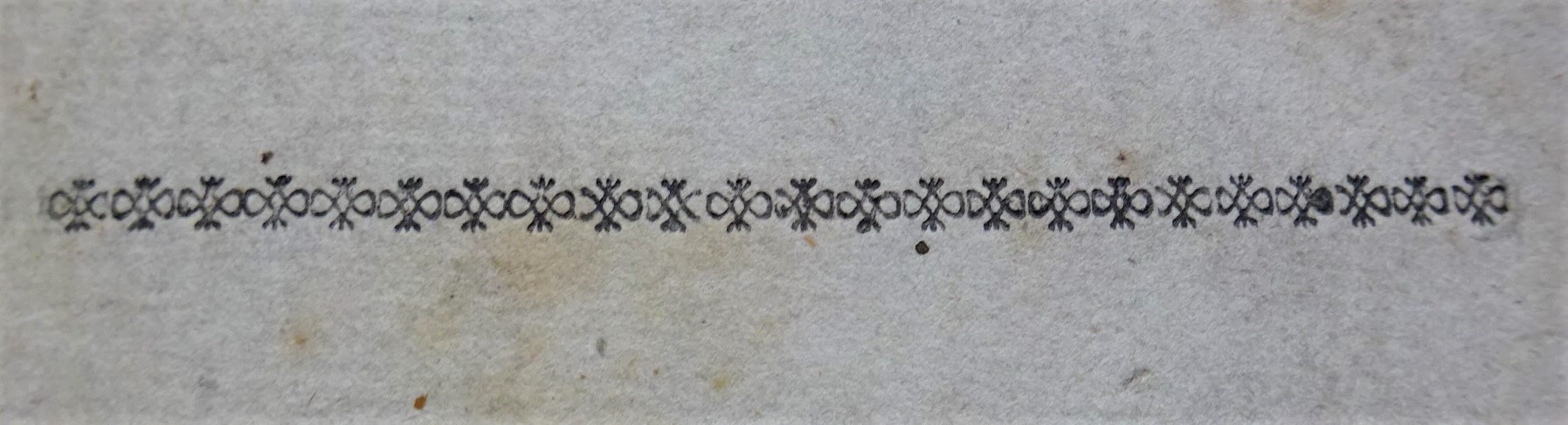
Very few fleurons were used in the Edinburgh Edition by type or by number.

Burns added a number of annotations to clarify or enhance the understanding of his works such as with "Halloween" on page 156 and his notes on the "Cove of Colean" (Culzean) as the Elfhame or home of the fairies.

Such was the popularity of the Kilmarnock Edition that his family back at Mossgiel were only able to read his work in print from the Edinburgh Edition, despite Gilbert Burns having subscribed for 70 copies of the first.

Gilbert Burns recalled that Robert's friend John Ballantine, Provost of Ayr in 1787, had offered to lend money for the publication of the Edinburgh Edition as well as advising him to contact an Edinburgh publisher. On 18 April 1787 Robert wrote to him to say that he had sent John one hundred copies of his newly published poems and songs.

Two songs that Burns had intended to add to the 1787 edition were rejected as "defamatory libels against the fastidious powers of Poesy and Taste" by a jury of Literati. These were "Young Peggy Blooms our Boniest Lass" and "Twas Even; or, The Lass of Ballochmyle".

=== The Stinking Edition ===
It could be argued that in 1787 two editions were published and Burns himself once referred to his second and third editions. The printings however are usually regarded as variant settings of one edition with mainly accidental changes. Around 10% of the variants have been found to have sheets from both settings. The editions have 51 half-sheet gatherings of which 5 were for the subscription list, two for the contents, 42 for the text of the poems and 3 for the glossary.

William Smellie had printed a first run of pages as far as the gathering or signature "Mm" (page 281) when he discovered that he had insufficient copies to cover all the subscribers and due to a shortage of type he was forced to reset the printing blocks and repeat the run as a partial second impression. Burns had remarked that Smellie was also publishing a Gaelic Bible and a Hebrew grammar. In the haste to reset the blocks a large number of mainly minor errors were introduced, the most famous of which is the substitution of a "t" for a "k" that converted the Scots word "skinking" (meaning watery) into "stinking". This error has resulted in the term "Stinking Burns" or "Stinking Edition" being applied to this possibly rarer setting, around 1000 out of 3000 copies reportedly carrying this variation.

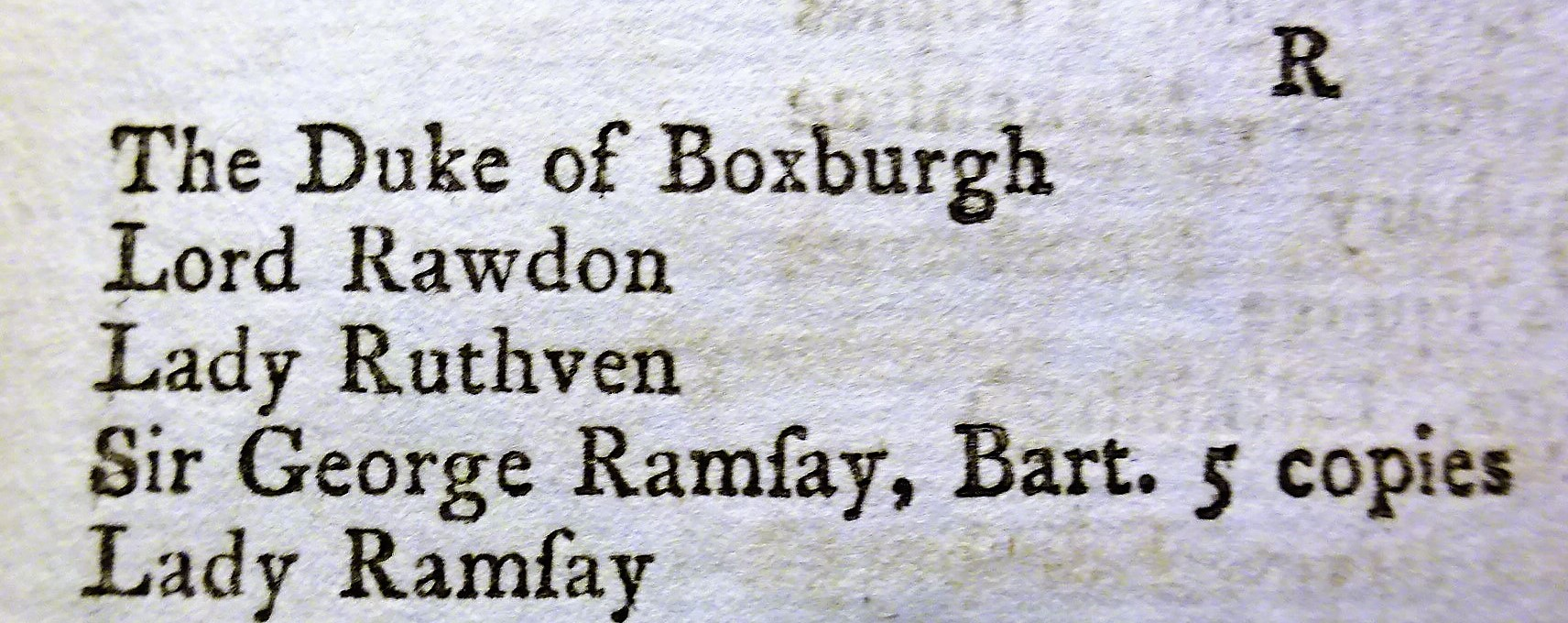
The "Boxburgh" misprint in the subscribers' section.

The other well-known error "Duke of Boxburgh" for "Duke of Roxburgh" is common to both impressions on page xxxvii of the subscribers list. Another error is that page 232 is given as "332". Altogether around three hundred differences exist between the two impressions, two hundred being noted as far back as 1888.

The evidence suggests that although Burns was not very closely involved with proof reading and setting the second setting he may have introduced a small number of authentic Scots spellings whilst the remainder of the differences were accidental.

The full details are that the gathering "Kk" appears to have been overlooked at first and as with the gatherings "Nn" to "Yy" the contents of the two impressions are identical. Gatherings "a" to "f" bore the title page, portrait, dedication (Dated 4 April 1787), etc. and were printed in one run towards the end of the process. The dedication was 200 words shorter than the Kilmarnock Edition.

The portrait was printed from a copper plate and close observation shows that is not printed onto the same laid or "chain and line" type of paper but on wove or velin paper that lacks the visible lines of the laid. The Subscribers Names list required an addenda. All the errors and differences in the partial second impression occur in gatherings "Aa" to "Ii" and "Ll" to "Mm". For example, on the very first page of poems, the line "That bears the name of Auld King Coel" has "of" in the second impression and "o'" in the first.

Robert Burns probably made £855 from selling the copyright to William Creech and from the profits from the sale of copies, However his printing and paper costs are not known for certain. The Glasgow bookseller John Smith had subscribed for twelve copies and also acted as his agents for distributing the volumes to subscribers, charging only 5% for the service. He saw this as modest and commented "You seem a very decent sort o'folk." Adding that "but eh! they're sair birkies in Edinburgh."

Six of the original holograph manuscript versions of the poems from the Kilmarnock and Edinburgh editions are in the possession of the Irvine Burns Club in North Ayrshire, who also possess a copy of the Kilmarnock Edition and the Edinburgh Edition.

=== The publisher ===
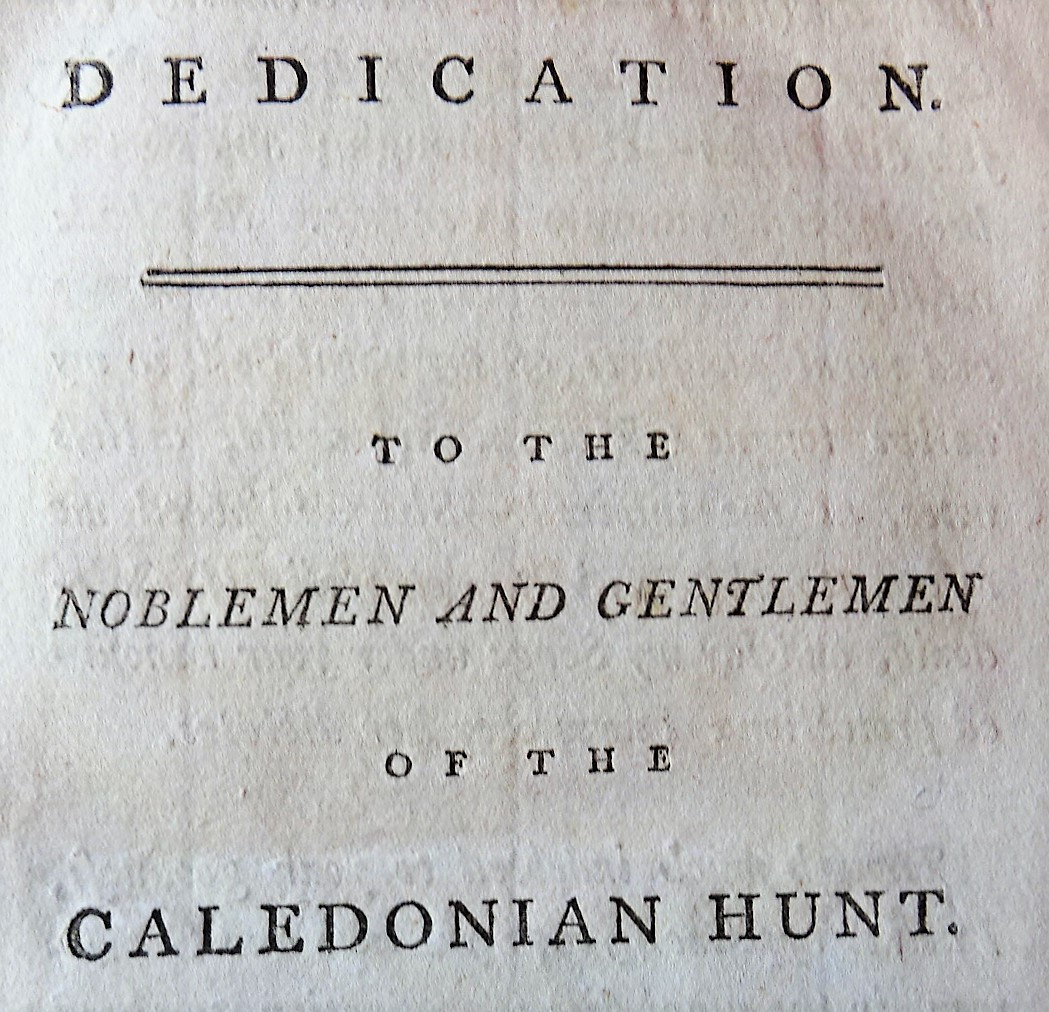
Dedication of the Edinburgh Edition to the Caledonian Hunt.

In the announcement of the publication William Creech is named as the publisher however the statement goes on to say that "This book is printed by subscription for the sole benefit of the author". Creech had no financial responsibility therefore, however on the title-page the statement "Printed for the author, and sold by William Creech." Creech can be technically seen as the publisher, however the financial and practical arrangements were not straightforward.

In a letter to Robert Aiken in December 1786 he refers to him as "Dear Patron of my Virgin Muse" that has been interpreted as inferring that he may have been an intermediary in Burns introduction to William Smellie and William Creech. He had collected nearly a quarter of all subscriptions for Burns's Kilmarnock Edition.

Burns gave £180 to his brother Gilbert out of the circa £700 that the Edinburgh Edition had earned him.

== The Portrait of Robert Burns ==
A portrait had not originally been advertised to potential subscribers, however when it became clear that 3000 or so copies were to be printed the decision was made to include one. Some may have been sold separately in addition to the three dozen on India paper at a shilling each that Burns sent with "bread and butter letters" to those that had shown him kindness whilst he was in Edinburgh.

William Creech commissioned Alexander Nasmyth to paint Burns's portrait, from which John Beugo engraved the copper plate required for the printing process. Nasmyth was a landscape painter and was reluctant to take on the work; however, he met with Burns and they became friends, resulting in Nasmyth producing a portrait which he never fully completed due to his concern over spoiling what he had already achieved. John Beugo the engraver arranged several sittings with Burns and produced a better likeness as confirmed by Gilbert Burns, for which he would not accept payment. Nasmyth refused payment from Creech and gave the painting to Jean Armour.

An intriguing incident is that Burns had heard that Creech was secretly publishing another edition and to prove this he visited Beugo and asked for the engraved plate used to print the frontispiece portrait. Beugo engraved a "distinguishing mark" on it and this secret mark subsequently appeared on a large number of copies of the Edinburgh edition. McQueen records that "Beugo was suspicious when William Creech asked for the copper-plate engraving of Burns, so he put a secret note on the engraving".

=== Presentation, loaned copies, Subscribers, etc ===
In 1910 a copy of the Edinburgh Edition annotated by Burns was discovered in Dumfries. Of particular assistance was the identification of many of the people who the poet had referred to in his work, some of whom had been the subject of much speculation. The epitaph on "Wee Johnie" was proved for instance to refer to the Rev. John Kennedy and not to his printer John Wilson. John Syme also had a copy annotated by Burns.

Burns presented a copy to "Mr. Nicoll, High Street, Edinburgh", who was the "Willie" of "Willie brewed a peck o' maut", inscribing it as from "the author". Often accompanied with a letter Burns also presented copies to George Reid and his daughter Jenny, the family who he borrowed a horse from, William Dunbar and a Miss Farquhar, possibly daughter of James Farquhar, a subscriber.

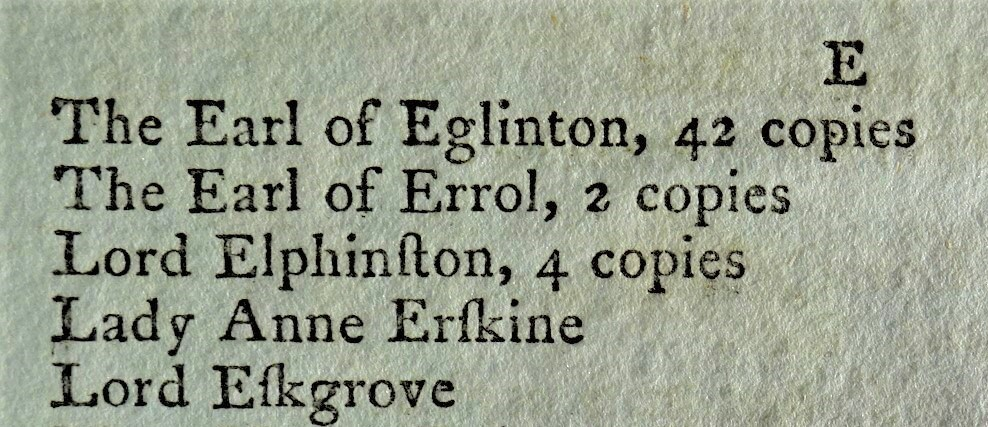
The Earl of Eglinton in the subscribers list.

Burns borrowed a copy of the 1787 Edinburgh Edition from John Geddes at Edinburgh in 1787 and carried it with him on his Tour of the Highlands. It had been bound in with twenty seven extra blank pages and upon returning it to Geddes in 1789, the owner found that Burns had written twelve poems in it. "The Geddes Burns" is now with an owner in America and 473 facsimile copies have been published. Geddes was responsible, in his position of influence as a Catholic bishop, in persuading five Catholic seminaries to subscribe to the Edinburgh Edition.

The Earl of Eglinton appears to be amongst the most enthusiastic subscribers as he sent ten guineas to Burns on his arrival in Edinburgh as a subscription for a "brace", that is two copies, quoted however as 42 by most authors (36 by one and in the subscribers list) of the Edinburgh Edition of the Poems. At 5s for subscribers and 6s for others, 10 guineas for two would have been extremely generous. and the actual intention is quoted as "To bespeak (order in advance) the new edition and hand him a suitable gift of money". Mrs. Dunlop of Dunlop, a regular correspondent of Burns, had spoken to her friend Doctor John Moore about Burns as a "Miracle of Genius", and it was this "Kind Man" who had encouraged the earl to become a patron of Burns.

Included in the Notanda of the Meeting of the Caledonian Hunt at Edinburgh on 10 January 1787: "A motion being made by the Earl of Glencairn, and seconded by Sir John Whitefoord in favour of Mr Burns, Ayrshire, who had dedicated the new edition of his poems to the Caledonian Hunt, the meeting was of the opinion that in consideration of his superior merit, as well as of the compliment paid to them, Mr Hogart should be directed to subscribe for one hundred copies in their name, for which he should pay Mr Burns £25, upon the publication of his book."

Burns had however originally expected to receive a payment of a Guinea for each copy. The Earl of Glencairn is also recorded as having subscribed personally to eight copies and his mother, the dowager countess, sixteen copies.

Burns sent no less than 100 copies of his newly published work to John Ballantine, a merchant banker and Provost of Ayr, requesting that he make arrangements for them to be sold locally and later he requested that some of the proceeds be sent to Gilbert Burns who was struggling to make a success of farming at Mossgiel.

John Farquhar-Gray of Gilmilnscroft subscribed for two copies. John was the Justice of the Peace and magistrate who is said to have married Robert and Jean in a secret civil ceremony circa April 1788.

General Sam Houston (1793–1863) had a 1787 Edinburgh Edition, published in Philadelphia as a pirated edition, that had belonged to his mother Elizabeth Paxton. He carried this volume with him on his military and political campaigns. It is displayed in the Sam Houston Memorial Museum in Huntsville, Texas.

== Subsequent editions ==
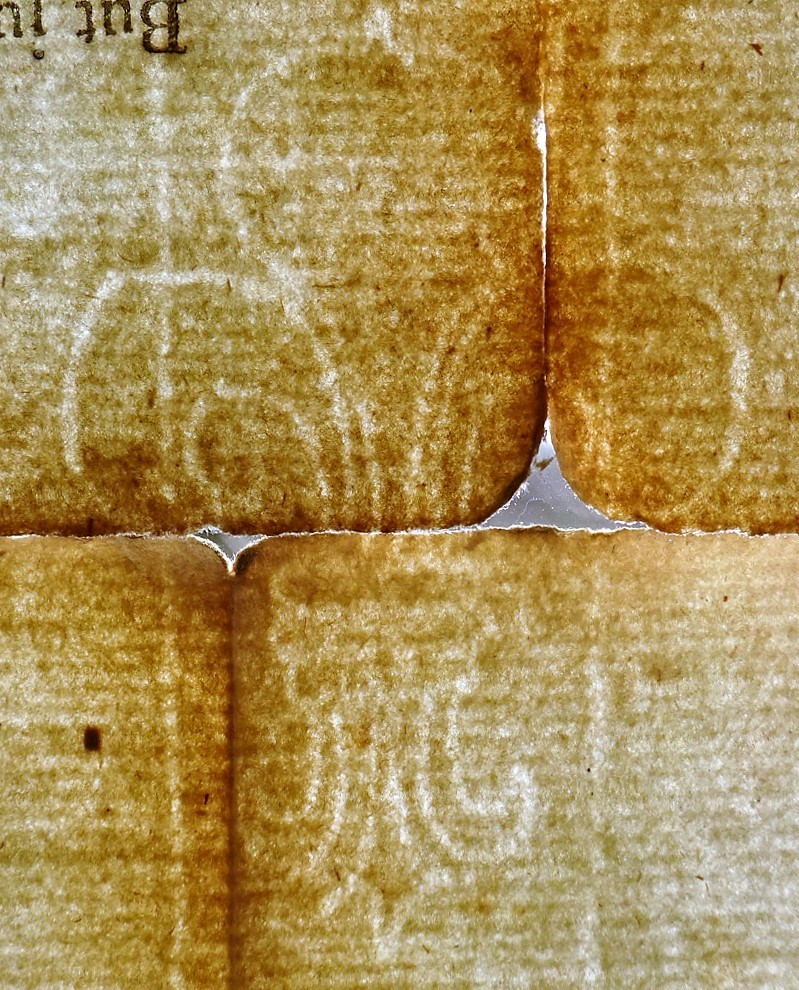
The fleur-de-lis watermark of the handmade paper.

In 1793 a second two-volume Edinburgh Edition was published, Creech having made a handsome profit on the first,. much enlarged and for the first time containing the poem "Tam o' Shanter". although It had already appeared in such publications as the second volume of Francis Grose's Antiquities of Scotland, for which it was originally written. A reprint was issued in 1794, in boards, with the same and additional errors to those in the 1793 publication.

The first London Edition was published by A Strahan and T Cadell directly from a copy of the Edinburgh edition in 1787 and as a copy of the "Stinking Edition" was used the "stinking" error was perpetuated within it and therefore the London Edition is also sometimes known as the "Stinking Edition".

Other 18th century editions are those published in Dublin, Belfast, London, Philadelphia and New York, not always with the authors knowledge or with the permission of William Creech, the copyright holder.

The copyright for the 1787 Edinburgh Edition expired in 1801.

== The poems and songs of the 1787 Robert Burns Edinburgh edition ==
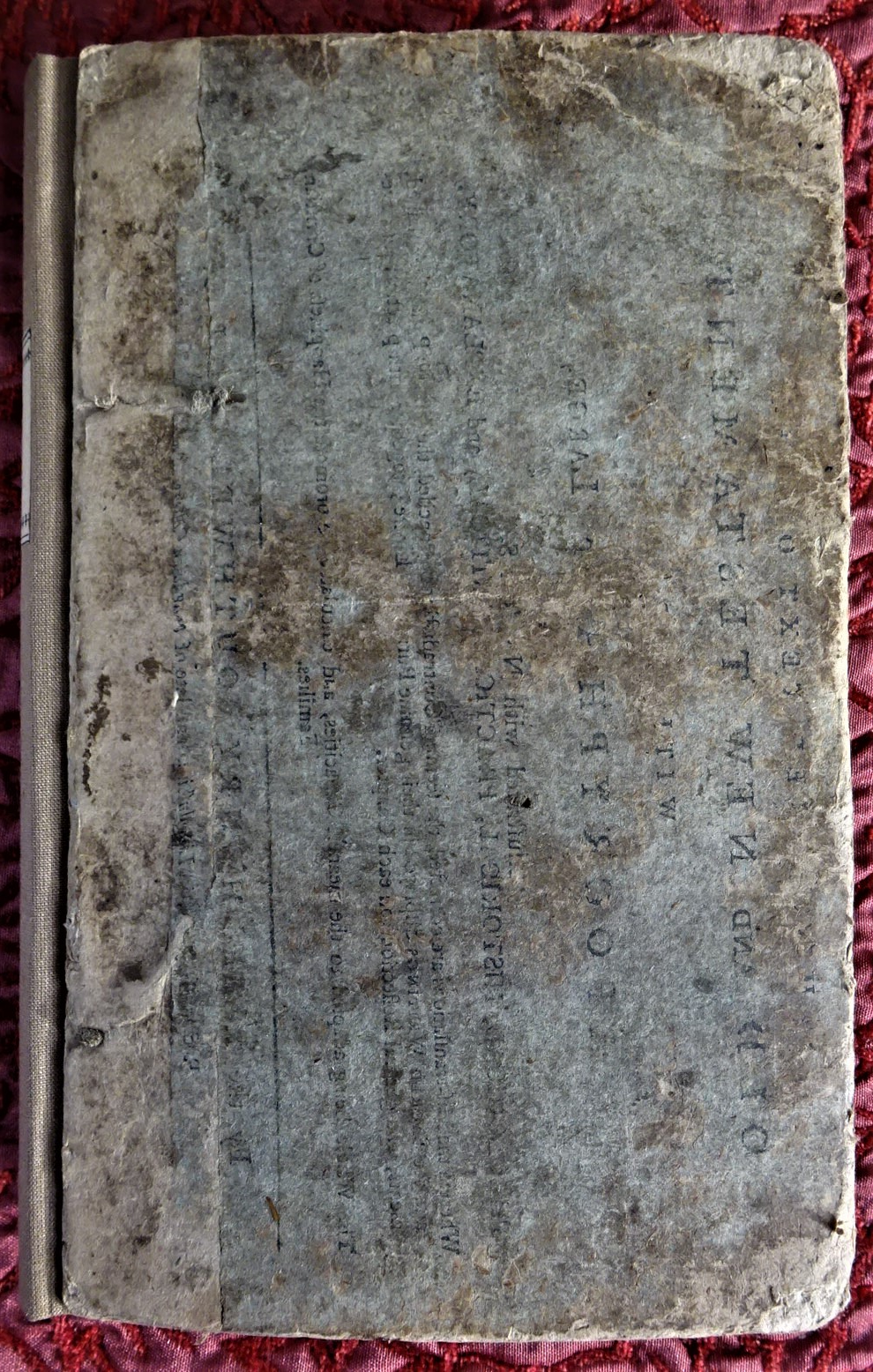
Uncut Edingurgh Edition in printers boards

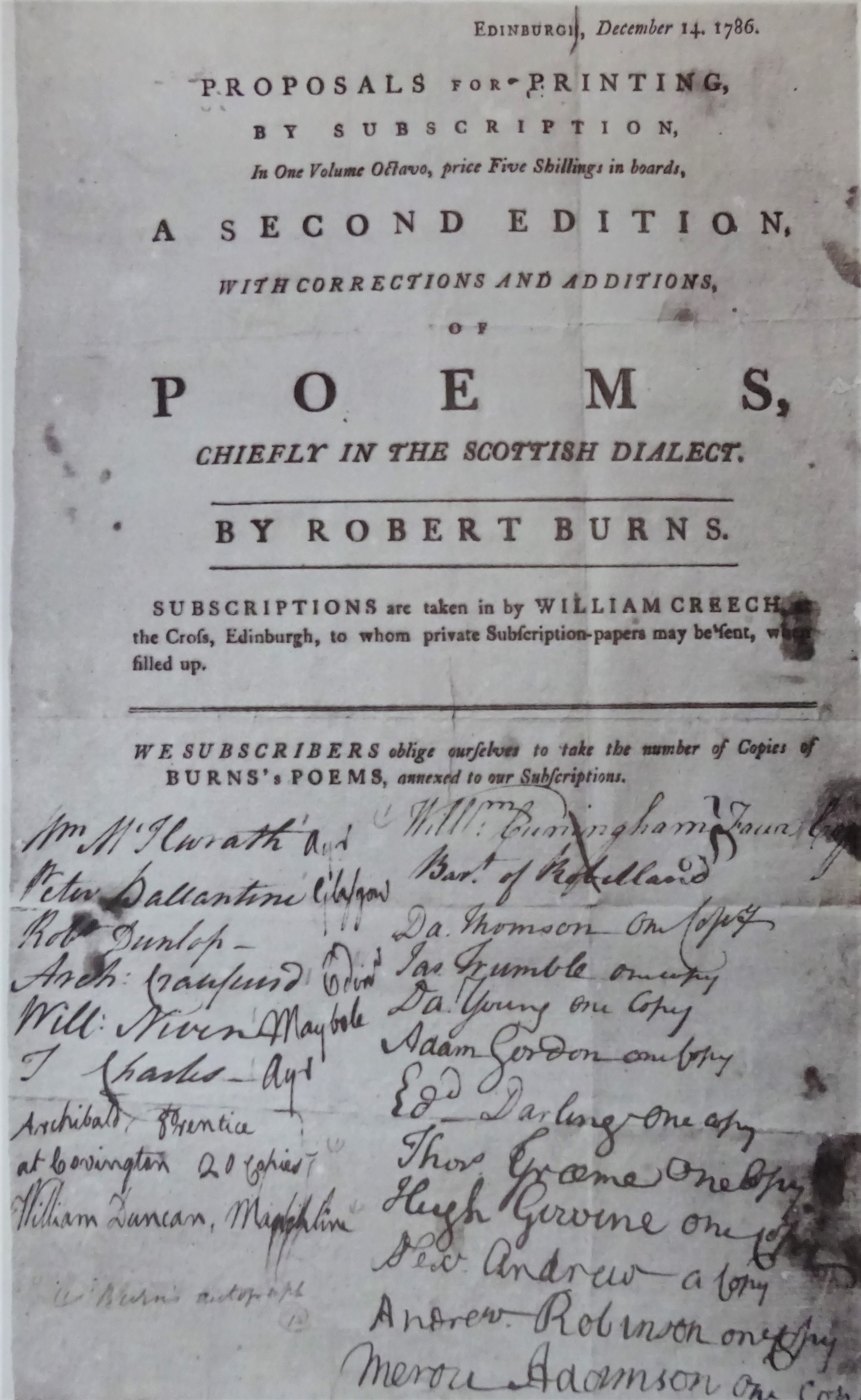
The Advertisement for the First Edinburgh Edition of 1787.

1. "The Twa Dogs. A Tale"
2. "Scotch Drink"
3. "The Author's Earnest Cry and Prayer to the Scotch Representatives in the House of Commons"
4. "The Holy Fair"
5. "Death and Doctor Hornbook. A True Story"*
6. "The Brigs of Ayr, A Poem"*
7. "The Ordination"*
8. "The Calf"*
9. "Address to the Deil"
10. "The Death and Dying Words of Poor Mailie"
11. "Poor Mailie's Elegy"
12. "To J. S****" (James Smith)
13. "A Dream"
14. "The Vision"
15. "Address to the Unco Guid, or the Rigidly Righteous"*
16. "Tam Samson's Elegy"*
17. "Halloween"
18. "The Auld Farmer's New-Year Morning's Salutation to his Auld Mare, Maggie"
19. "The Cotter's Saturday Night"
20. "To A Mouse"
21. "A Winter Night"*
22. "Epistle to Davie, a Brother Poet"
23. "The Lament"
24. "Despondency. An Ode"
25. "Man was made to Mourn. An Elegy"
26. "Winter. A Dirge"
27. "A Prayer, in the Prospect of Death"
28. "Stanzas on the same occasion"*
29. "Verses left at a Friend's House"*
30. "The First Psalm"*
31. "A Prayer"*
32. "The First Six Verses of the Ninetieth Psalm"*
33. "To a Mountain Daisy"
34. "To Ruin"
35. "To Miss L____, with Beattie's Poems for a New-year's Gift" (Logan)*
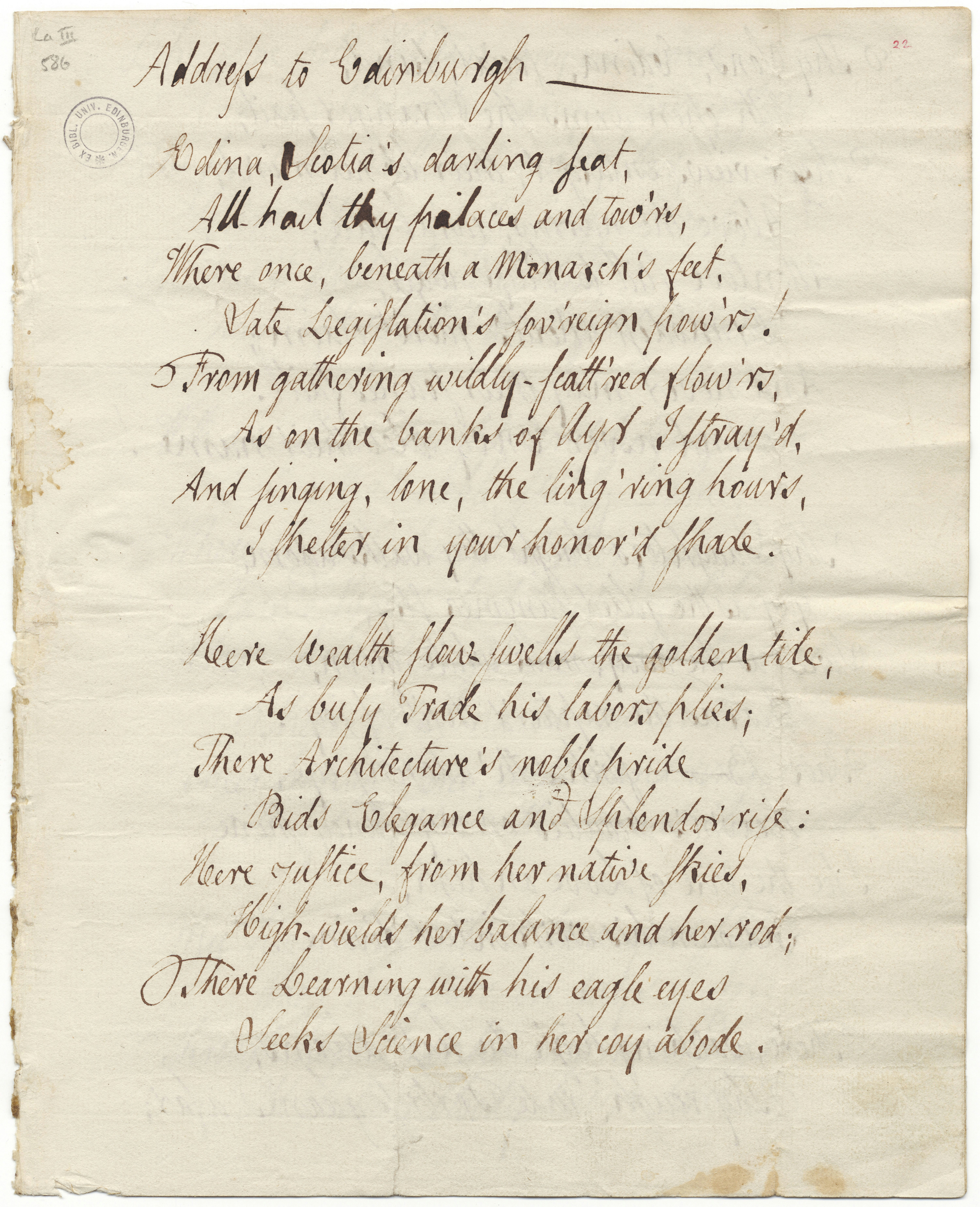
36. This manuscript copy of "Address to Edinburgh" written in Burns's hand, was sent in 1787 to Lady Henrietta Don (née Cunningham), sister to the Earl of Glencairn. The manuscript is now part of the Laing Collection at the University of Edinburgh.
  "Epistle to a Young Friend"
37. "On a Scotch Bard gone to the West Indies"
38. "To a Haggis"*
39. "A Dedication to G**** H******* Esq." (Gavin Hamilton)*
40. "To a Louse, on seeing one on a Lady's Bonnet at Church"
41. "Address to Edinburgh"*
42. "Epistle to J. L*****, an old Scotch Bard" (John Lapraik)
43. "To the same"
44. "Epistle to W. S*****, Ochiltree" (William Simpson)
45. "Epistle to J. R******, inclosing some Poems" (John Rankine)
46. "John Barleycorn. A Ballad"*
47. "A Fragment, 'When Guilford good our Pilot stood'"*
48. Song, "It was upon a Lammas night"
49. Song, "Now westlin winds and slaughtering guns"
50. Song, "Behind yon hills where Stinchar flows"*
51. Green grow the Rashes. A Fragment"*
52. Song, "Again rejoicing Nature sees"*
53. Song, "The gloomy night is gath'ring fast"*
54. Song, "From thee, Eliza, I must go"
55. "The Farewell. To the Brethren of St James's Lodge, Tarbolton"
56. Song, "No churchman am I for to rail and to rite"*
57. "Epitaph on a celebrated Ruling Elder"
58. "Epitaph on a noisy Polemic"
59. "Epitaph on Wee Johnie"
60. "Epitaph for the Author's Father"
61. "Epitaph for R. A. Esq." (Robert Aitken)
62. "Epitaph for G. H. Esq." (Gavin Hamilton)
63. "A Bard's Epitaph"

*A poem or song not printed in the Kilmarnock Edition of 1786.

( ) – The missing name from the poem or song.

Burns as illustrated above used a variety of methods to keep the names of individuals more or less hidden, such as with a series of asterisks between a first and last letter denoting missing letters, a solid line giving no clue to the number of letters or initials only.

== See also ==
- A Manual of Religious Belief
- Poems, Chiefly in the Scottish Dialect (Second Edinburgh Edition)
- Poems, Chiefly in the Scottish Dialect (London Edition)
- Poems, Chiefly in the Scottish Dialect (Dublin Variant)
- Robert Burns World Federation
- Burns Clubs
- Irvine Burns Club
- Poems by David Sillar
- Glenriddell Manuscripts
