= Robert Charles Bell (engraver) =

Scottish engraver (1806–1872)

Robert Charles Bell (15 September 1806 – 5 September 1872) was a Scottish engraver.

== Life ==
Bell was born at Edinburgh and at an early age he was articled to John Beugo, the friend of Robert Burns, and while in his studio he also attended the classes at the Trustees' Academy, then under the direction of Sir William Allan. After leaving Beugo he engraved a series of Scottish views and a considerable number of vignette portraits.

Bell died in Edinburgh on 5 September 1872. His son, Robert Purves Bell, A.R.S.A., was a Scottish painter of figure subjects.

== Works ==
The works which brought Bell into notice were 'The Rush Plaiters,' after Sir George Harvey, and the plates which he engraved for the Royal Scottish Association, among which were 'The Widow' and 'Roger and Jenny,' after Sir William Allan; 'The Expected Penny,' after Alexander Fraser; 'The Quarrel Scene in The Dowie Dens o' Yarrow,' after Sir J. Noel Paton and 'Baillie McWhirter at Breakfast,' after J. Eckford Lauder.

A major plate was 'The Battle of Preston Pans,' after Sir William Allan, upon which he was engaged at intervals for some years, and which he had only just completed at the time of his death. Several of his best plates appeared in The Art Journal between the years 1850 and 1872. They included 'The Duet,' after William Etty; 'The Philosopher,' after Henry Wyatt; 'The Bagpiper,' after Sir David Wilkie; and 'The Young Brother,' after William Mulready, from the pictures formerly in the Vernon Gallery; 'Teasing the Pet,' after that by Frans van Mieris the Elder in the Royal Collection; 'Sancho Panza,' after that by C. R. Leslie in the Sheepshanks Collection; 'Words of Comfort,' after Thomas Faed; 'Renewal of the Lease refused,' after Erskine Nicol; and 'Within a Mile of Edinbro' Town,' after John Faed.
