= Coadjutor =

The term "coadjutor" (literally "co-assister" in Latin) is a title qualifier indicating that the holder shares the office with another person, with powers equal to the other in all but formal order of precedence.

These include:

- Coadjutor bishop, or Coadjutor archbishop
- Coadjutor vicar, or Coadjutor apostolic vicar
- Coadjutor eparch, or Coadjutor archeparch
- Coadjutor exarch, or Coadjutor apostolic exarch

== Overview ==
The office is ancient. "Coadjutor", in the 1883 Catholic Dictionary, says:

One who helps a prelate, or a priest holding a benefice, in discharging the duties of his bishopric or benefice. Coadjutorship may be of two kinds: one temporary and revocable, allowed on account of sickness or other incapacity, and implying no right of succession; the other perpetual and irrevocable, and carrying with it the right to succeed the person coadjuted. In this latter sense it is expressly forbidden by the Council of Trent; nevertheless the Pope, for special causes, sometimes concedes it, the plenitude of his apostolic power enabling him legally to dispense with the law. If a coadjutor is required for a parish priest, it is for the bishop of the diocese to nominate one; if for a bishop, the nomination belongs to the Pope, any usage to the contrary notwithstanding. In the case of a priest, if the incapacity is temporary or curable, he must appoint a vicar or substitute, not a coadjutor. The various infirmities which justify coadjutorship—serious and incurable illness, leprosy, loss of speech, &c. —are specified in the canon law. In the case of a bishop, the terms "administrator " and "suffragan" mean much the same as coadjutor, the differences being, that the administrator's function ceases when the bishop resumes charge of the diocese or dies, and a suffragan assists the bishop in things which relate to his ministry, but has no jurisdiction; while a coadjutor has jurisdiction, and his rights may, as we have seen, by special Papal permission, subsist after the death of the coadjuted. Various points affecting the precedence, dignity, and ceremonial attaching to a coadjutor bishop have been settled from time to time by the Congregation of Rites.

Another source identifies three kinds of coadjutors:

(1) Temporal and revocable.
(2) Perpetual and irrevocable.
(3) Perpetual, with the right of future succession.

It describes:

As regards temporal coadjutors. Since a cleric who enjoys a benefice cannot be deprived of it on account of old age or infirmity, it is fitting that he should have someone to assist him in the work. This substitute or coadjutor has a claim in justice to share the fruits of the benefice in a reasonable proportion. The sacred Sess. xxi. canons only speak of parochial churches; and the Council of Trent orders the bishops, as delegates of the Holy See, to provide parish priests, who are ignorant but of good life, with coadjutors and vicars, and to assign these a sufficient share of the fruits of the benefice. As regards benefices without cure of souls, it is not the custom to give these temporary coadjutors, as the end in view can be attained by other means. As regards perpetual coadjutors. The Council of Trent forbids absolutely perpetual coadjutors except for bishops and abbots, and this only under the conditions—viz. (1) that the necessity is pressing and the utility evident; (2) and that the coadjutorship be not given with the hope of future succession.

== See also ==
- Bishop (disambiguation)
- Vicar (disambiguation)
- Exarch (disambiguation)
