= Poems, Chiefly in the Scottish Dialect (London Edition) =

1787 collection of poems by Robert Burns

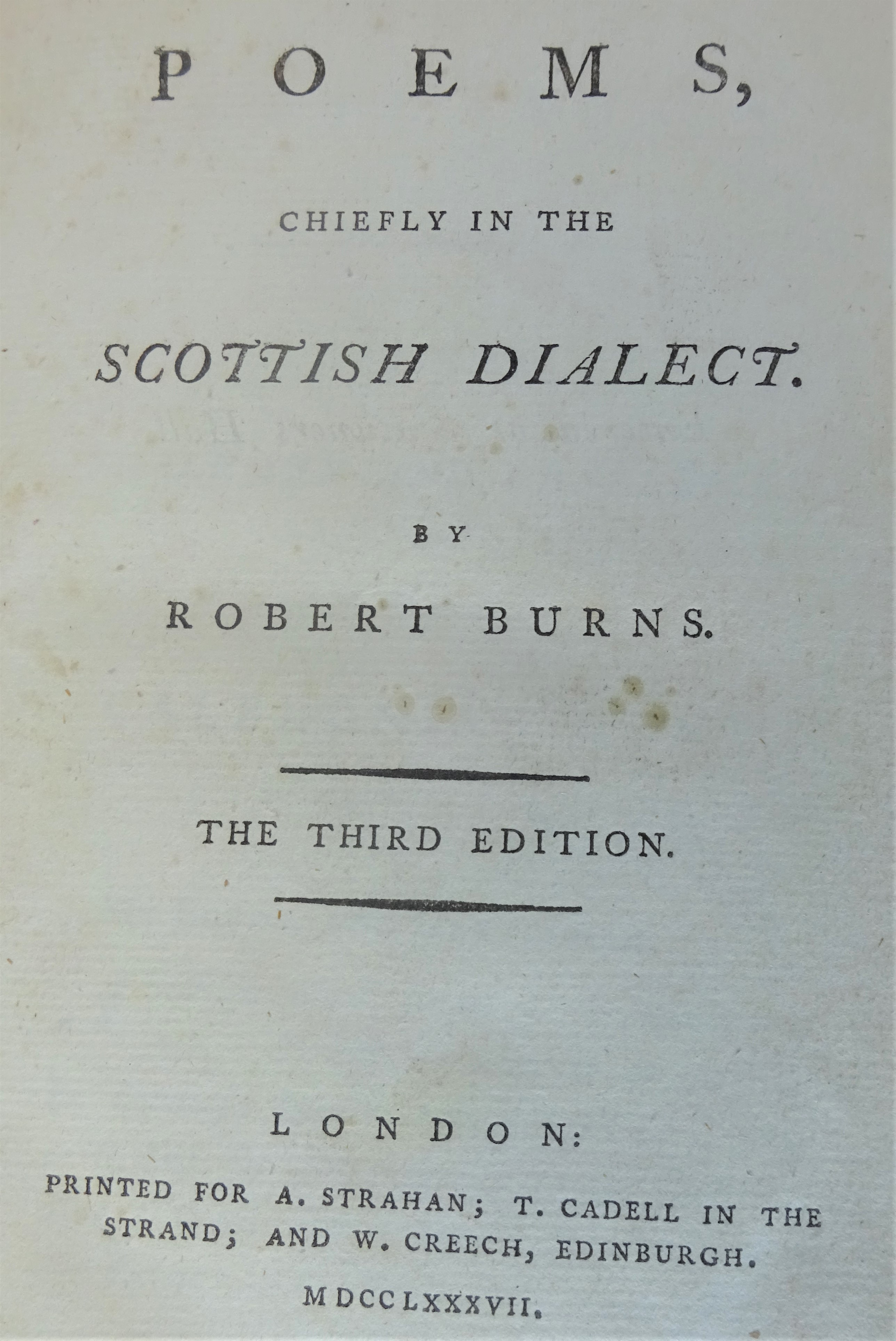
- Second edition of 1787 – portrait and title pages
- Author: Robert Burns
- Original title: Poems, Chiefly Scottish
- Cover artist: John Beugo after Alexander Nasmyth
- Language: Scots & English
- Genre: Poetry and Lyrics
- Publisher: Strahan & Cadell of London; William Creech of Edinburgh
- Publication date: 1787
- Publication place: Great Britain

Poems, Chiefly in the Scottish Dialect (London Edition) is commonly known as the Third or London Edition and sometimes the Stinking Edition. It is a collection of poetry and songs by Robert Burns, printed for A. Strahan; T. Cadell in the Strand; and W. Creech, Edinburgh. MDCCLXXXVII The date of publication for the London Edition was in November 1787, however Strahan and Cadell had previously advertised for sale the 'Second' or 'Edinburgh Edition' using the 500 or so copies that William Creech still had that were unsold. The successful selling of these made a truly new 'London Edition' a commercially viable enterprise.

The Kilmarnock Edition made Robert Burns Caledonia's Bard whilst the 'Edinburgh Edition' and the 'London Edition' elevated him into a position amongst the world's greatest poets.

== The Edition and its contents ==
It was called the third published edition of Burns's poems, his first edition having been printed in Kilmarnock in 1786, however pirated editions had already been published in Belfast and Dublin making it in reality the fifth edition. The true 'London Edition' cost 7 shillings. It is not known how many copies of the 'London Edition' were printed. Around 3,250 copies of the 'Edinburgh Edition' had been printed and only 612 copies of the Kilmarnock Edition of which 84 are known to survive, but no record exists of the number of the London and Edinburgh Editions that are extant.

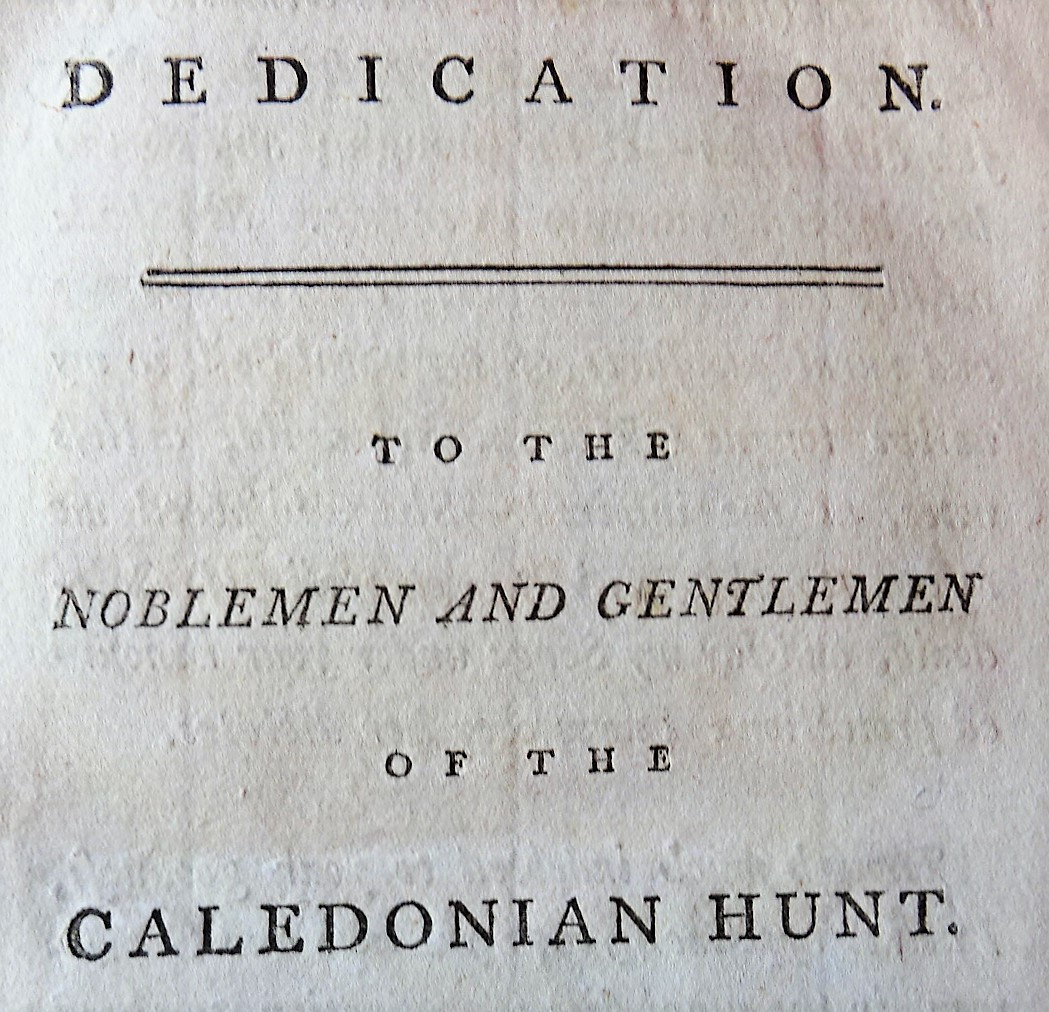
Dedication of the London Edition to the Caledonian Hunt.

The volume was again dedicated to the Noblemen and Gentlemen of the Caledonian Hunt. The 1787 London and Edinburgh editions contain an extra seventeen poems and five new songs. In addition most of the poems present in the 1786 Kilmarnock Edition are reprinted such as "Halloween", "The Twa Dogs", "The Cotter's Saturday Night", "To a Mouse", etc. New poems included Death and Doctor Hornbrook, The Brigs of Ayr, The Holy Fair, John Barleycorn, Address to the Unco Guid, or the Rigidly Righteous and significantly To a Haggis (often given elsewhere as Address to a Haggis). Of the seven new songs Green grow the Rashes. A Fragment is an example of Burns's gift for re-working traditional folk-verse.

The sequence of the contents is also slightly different with the dedication followed by the contents, then the subscribers list followed by the poems and songs and finally the glossary. It is unclear why the subscribers list needed to be printed in the 'London Edition' other than as an indication of the high status of the previous subscribers acting as a stimulus to prospective purchasers of this new edition. The addenda to the subscribers list is absent as the names were incorporated into the alphabetical listing by the printers and it is likely that those who Burns was unable to add to the list for the Edinburgh Edition were added here.

Nearly twice the length of the Kilmarnock Edition of 1786 it was printed in demy octavo format, measuring 8¾" by 5¾" (22.3 x 14.6 cm), untrimmed, had 372 pages, a 38-page subscribers list and the expanded 24-page glossary or 'dictionary' of Scots words for those unfamiliar with the language. It was published in French gray paper 'printers' boards with most copies subsequently being cut and ornately bound once purchased so that uncut copies in the original printer's boards with a cream paper spine and label are exceedingly rare. It is not clear whether or not the 500 or so 'Edinburgh Edition' copies had a new title page inserted bearing the names of Strahan and Cadell as well as Creech. London Editions are often in poor condition.

The 'chain and line' or laid paper used for the text, unlike the 'Edinburgh Edition' with its fleur-de-lis, does not carry a watermark and the portrait of Burns on the frontispiece is also printed on laid rather than the wove paper that was used for the 'Edinburgh Edition'.

Burns added a number of annotations to clarify or enhance the understanding of his works such as with Halloween on page 161 and his notes on the 'Cove of Colean' (Culzean) as the Elfhame or home of the fairies on page 159.

=== The Stinking Edition ===
The 'London Edition' is also sometimes confusingly known as the 'Stinking Edition' or 'Stinking Burns' because the original spelling mistake in the partial second inpression of the 'Edinburgh Edition' was used in error for the text of the true 'London Edition'. The origin of this error is because William Smellie had printed a first run of pages as far as the gathering or signature 'Mm' when he discovered that he had insufficient copies to cover all the subscribers and due to a shortage of type he was forced to reset the printing blocks and repeat the run as a partial second impression. In the haste to reset the blocks a large number of mainly minor errors were introduced, the most famous of which is the substitution of a 't' for a 'k' that converted the Scots word 'skinking' (meaning watery) into 'stinking'. This error has resulted in the term Stinking Burns or the Stinking Edition being applied to this rarer impression as well as the 'London Edition', around 1000 out of 3000 copies being so altered.

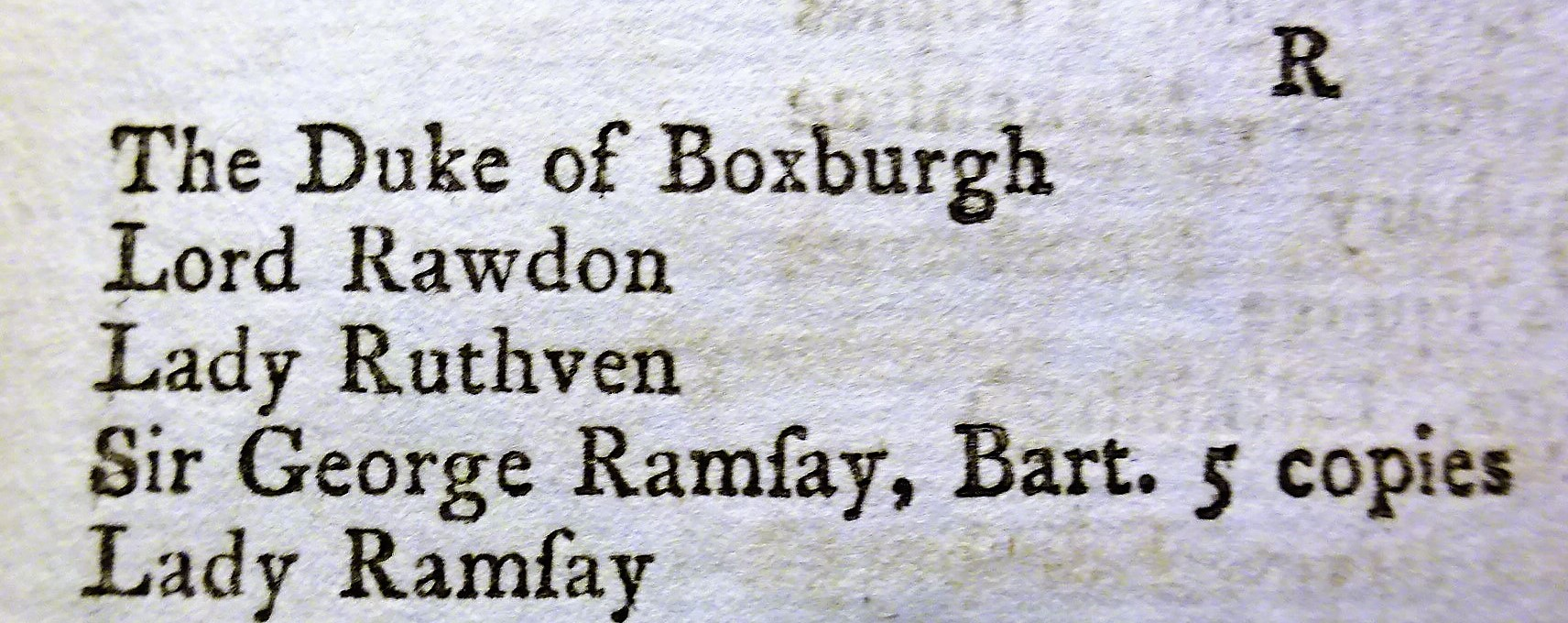
The 'Boxburgh' misprint in the subscribers section.

The other well known error 'Duke of Boxburgh' for 'Duke of Roxburgh' was corrected.

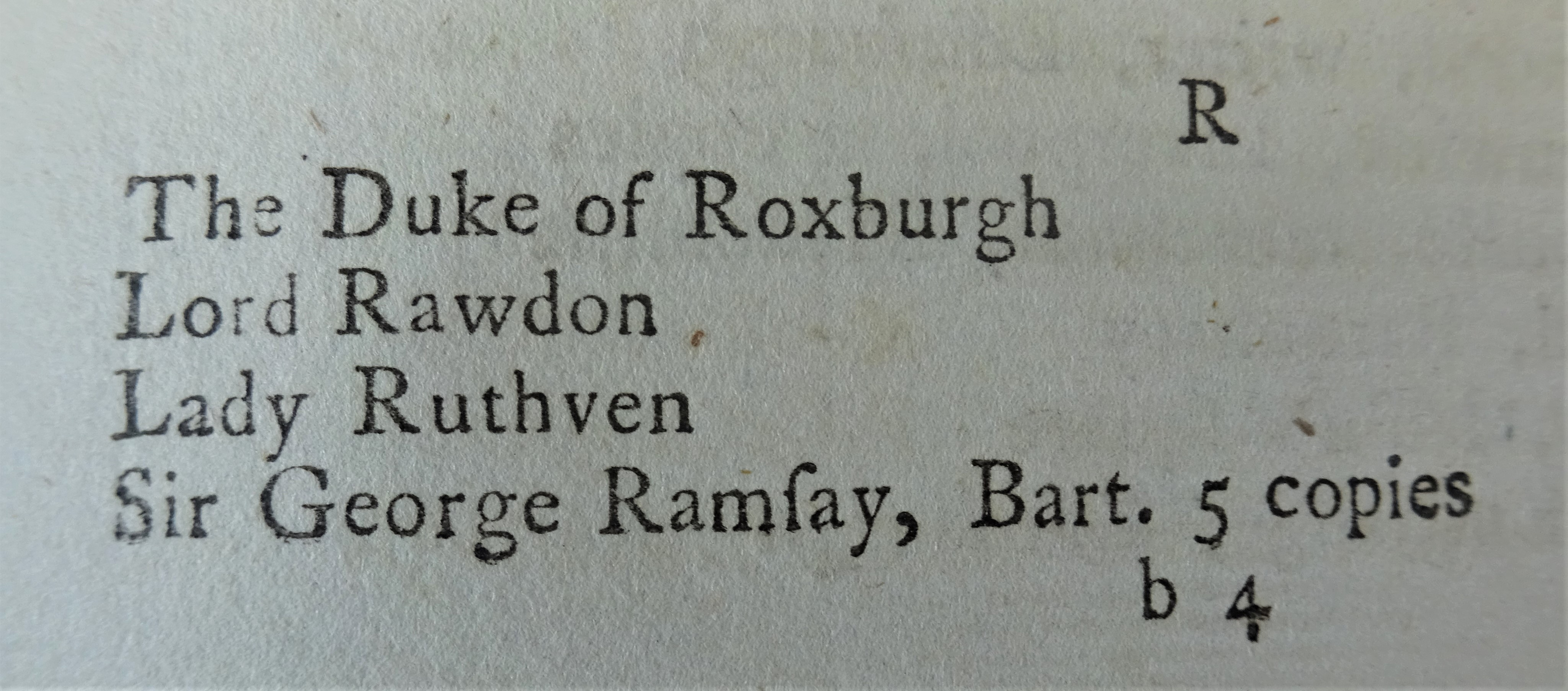
The corrected spelling of Roxburgh in the 'London Edition'.

Six of the original holograph manuscript versions of the poems published in the Kilmarnock, Edinburgh, London and later editions are in the possession of the Irvine Burns Club in North Ayrshire, who also possess a copy of the 1786 Kilmarnock Edition and the 1787 Edinburgh Edition.

=== The publishers ===
A. Strahan; T. Cadell in the Strand; and W. Creech, Edinburgh were the publishers of the 1787 'London Edition', however the 500 or so 'Second Edition' copies originated from the original subscription by William Creech for 'Edinburgh Editions'. These copies would differ considerably from the true 'London Editions' with a different typeface, various corrections and minor differences in layout, etc. The title page may also differ.

== The Portrait of Robert Burns ==
William Creech commissioned Alexander Nasmyth to paint Burns' portrait from which John Beugo engraved the copper plate required for the printing process. Nasmyth was a landscape painter and was reluctant to take on the work however he met with Burns and they became friends resulting in Nasmyth producing a portrait which he never fully completed due to his concern over spoiling what he had already achieved. John Beugo the engraver arranged several sittings with Burns and produced a better likeness as confirmed by Gilbert Burns. Nasmyth refused payment from Creech and gave the painting to Jean Armour.

An intriguing incident is that Burns had heard that Creech was secretly publishing another edition and to prove this he visited Beugo and asked for the engraved plate used to print the frontispiece portrait. Beugo engraved a 'distinguishing mark' on it and this secret mark subsequently appeared on a large number of copies of the Edinburgh edition and by extension, the first of the 'London Editions'.

== Subsequent editions ==
In 1793 a two volume Second Edinburgh Edition was published, much enlarged and for the first time containing the poem Tam o' Shanter, although It had already appeared in such publications as the second volume of Francis Grose's Antiquities of Scotland, for which it was originally written.

Other 18th century editions are those published in Dublin, Belfast, London and New York, not always with the authors knowledge or with the permission of William Creech, the copyright holder.

Thomas Stewart's 1802 edition is notorious for having included a section with twenty-five letters written by Sylvander Robert Burns to Clarinda Agnes Maclehose without the permission of the copyright holders.

The copyright for the 1787 'Edinburgh Edition' expired in 1801.

== The poems and songs of the 1787 Robert Burns London edition ==
1. The Twa Dogs. A Tale
2. Scotch Drink
3. The Author's Earnest Cry and Prayer to the Scotch Representatives in the House of Commons
4. The Holy Fair *
5. Death and Doctor Hornbook *
6. The Brigs of Ayr *
7. The Ordination *
8. The Calf *
9. Address to the Deil
10. The Death and Dying Words of Poor Mailie
11. Poor Mailie's Elegy
12. To J. S**** (James Smith)
13. A Dream
14. The Vision
15. Address to the Unco Guid, or the Rigidly Righteous *
16. Tam Samson's Elegy *
17. Halloween
18. The Auld Farmer's New-Year Morning's Salutation to his Auld Mare, Maggie
19. The Cotter's Saturday Night
20. To A Mouse
21. A Winter Night *
22. Epistle to Davie, a Brother Poet
23. The Lament
24. Despondency. An Ode.
25. Man was made to Mourn. An Elegy
26. Winter. A Dirge
27. A Prayer, in the Prospect of Death
28. Stanzas on the same occasion *
29. Verses left at a Friend's House *
30. The First Psalm*
31. A Prayer *
32. The First Six Verses of the Ninetieth Psalm *
33. To a Mountain Daisy
34. To Ruin
35. To Miss L____, with Beattie's Poems for a New-year's Gift (Logan) *
36. Epistle to a Young Friend
37. On a Scotch Bard gone to the West Indies
38. To a Haggis *
39. A Dedication to G**** H******* Esq; (Gavin Hamilton) *
40. To a Louse, on seeing one on a Lady's Bonnet at Church
41. Address to Edinburgh *
42. Epistle to J. L*****, an old Scotch Bard (John Lapraik)
43. To the same
44. Epistle to W. S*****, Ochiltree (William Simpson)
45. Epistle to J. R******, inclosing some Poems (John Rankine)
46. John Barleycorn. A Ballad *
47. A Fragment, 'When Guilford good our Pilot stood,' *
48. Song, 'It was upon a Lammas night'
49. Song, 'Now westlin winds and slaughtering guns'
50. Song, 'Behind yon hills where Stinchar flows' *
51. Green grow the Rashes. A Fragment *
52. Song, 'Again rejoicing Nature sees' *
53. Song, 'The gloomy Night is gath'ring fast' *
54. Song, 'From thee, Eliza, I must go'
55. The Farewell. To the Brethren of St James's Lodge, Tarbolton
56. Song, 'No churchman am I for to rail and to write' *
57. Epitaph on a celebrated Ruling Elder
58. _______ on a noisy Polemic
59. _______ on Wee Johnie
60. _______ for the Author's Father
61. _______ for R. A. Esq; (Robert Aitken)
62. _______ for G. H. Esq; (Gavin Hamilton)
63. A Bard's Epitaph
- A poem or song not printed in the 'Kilmarnock Edition' of 1786.

( ) – The missing name from the poem or song.

Burns as illustrated above used a variety of methods to keep the names of individuals more or less hidden, such as with a series of asterisks between a first and last letter denoting missing letters, a solid line giving no clue to the number of letters or initials only.

== See also ==
- A Manual of Religious Belief
- Poems, Chiefly in the Scottish Dialect (Edinburgh Edition)
- Poems, Chiefly in the Scottish Dialect (Dublin Variant)
- Poems, Chiefly in the Scottish Dialect (Second Edinburgh Edition)
- Robert Burns World Federation
- Burns Clubs
- Irvine Burns Club
- Poems by David Sillar
