= A Manual of Religious Belief =

1777 manual of religious belief by William Burnes

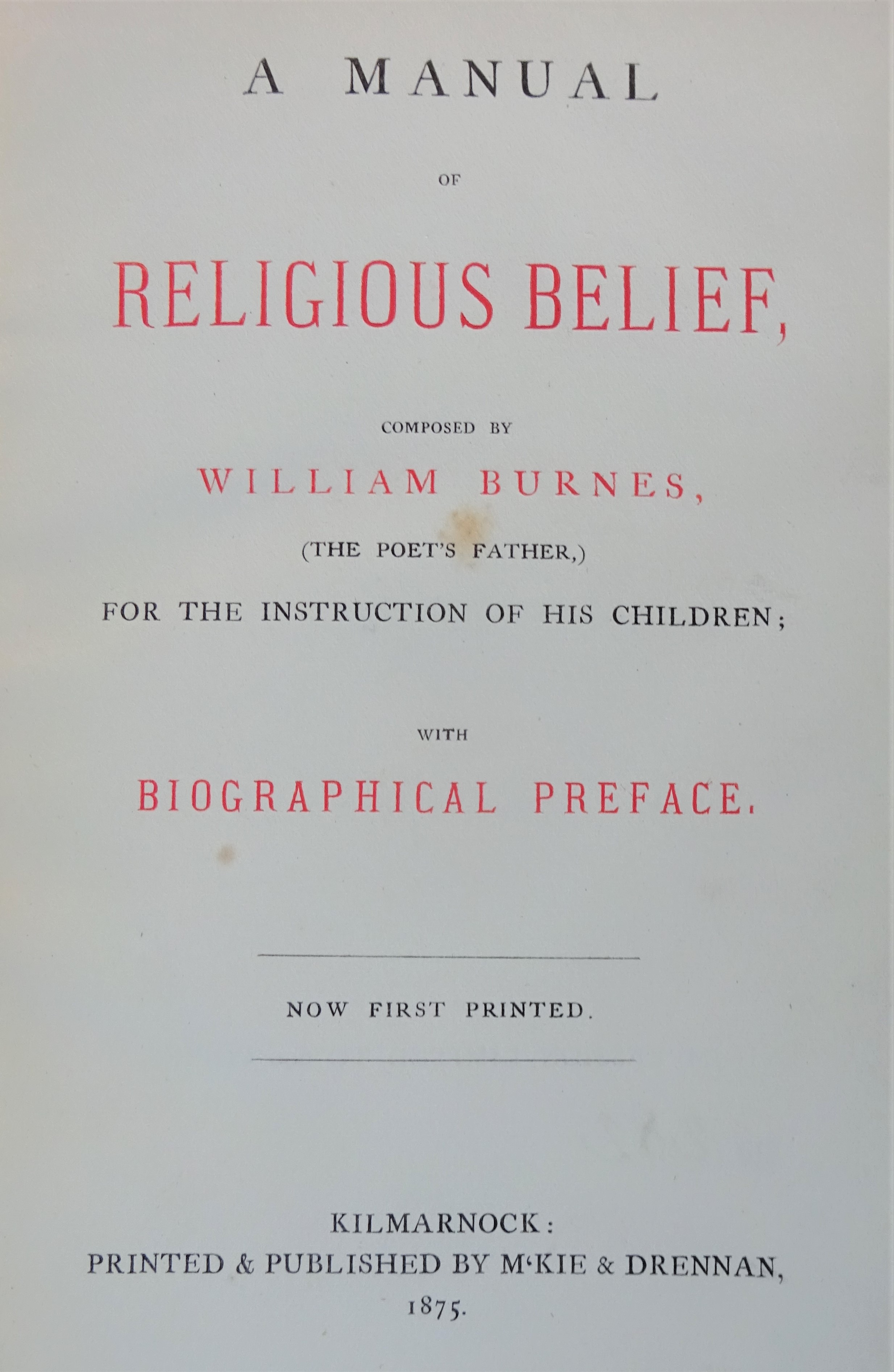
- First Edition with preface by James McKie
- Author: William Burnes
- Translator: John Murdoch
- Language: Scots & English
- Genre: Letters
- Publication place: Great Britain

The surviving manuscript of the instructional work A Manual of Religious Belief is written in the form of a theological dialogue between father and child written out in holograph by John Murdoch for William Burnes, Robert Burns's father. William had started to compose and compile the work before Robert Burns's birth and wrote the first rough draft that has not survived. This work was originally composed with a stronger Scots language content that Murdoch modified, as well as making grammatical corrections.

== History of the manuscript ==
The manuscript is unbound and is made up of only six leaves, quarto size, that is 16.5cms by 21 cms. The document is devoid of a title, contents page, pagination or even a record of authorship. It is lightly tied with a piece of red thread, and John Murdoch's legible and elegant handwriting is found on all the sheets except the final verso.

Burns's biographer, James Currie, stated that Gilbert Burns, Robert's brother, had the manual in his possession after his father's death and unlike many other Burns manuscripts used by Currie, it remained in the hands of the family, for in 1875 it passed from Gilbert to his youngest son, also Gilbert, who lived in Chapelizod, Dublin. The family of Gilbert Burns of Chapelizod donated the manuscript to the Robert Burns Birthplace Museum at Alloway in South Ayrshire.

== The manuscript and its contents ==
As stated William Burnes had been working on his theological manual for religious guidance since Robert's birth and probably before. The ponderous religious jargon used shows the religious influences of the 18th-century ministers, but producing the manual as a dialogue was very innovative for the time.

Murdoch had similar religious views to William, and probably transcribed the manuscript in 1765 when he was working at Alloway, adding only grammatical corrections and language alterations. William had used "douther" for "daughter" and his handwriting was not as readable as Murdoch's copperplate hand.

In 1875 the manual was transcribed and published for the first time by McKie and Drennan of Kilmarnock with a largely biographical introductory essay by a noted Burnsian, James Gibson of Liverpool. In 1896 Chambers-Wallace published a version which reached a wide audience and they first provided the now accepted name in their title :

A MANUAL OF RELIGIOUS BELIEF, IN A DIALOGUE
BETWEEN FATHER AND SON, COMPILED BY
WILLIAM BURNES, FARMER AT MOUNT
OLIPHANT, AYRSHIRE, AND TRANSCRIBED
WITH GRAMMATICAL CORRECTIONS
BY JOHN MURDOCH, TEACHER

== Introduction and questions asked in the dialogue ==
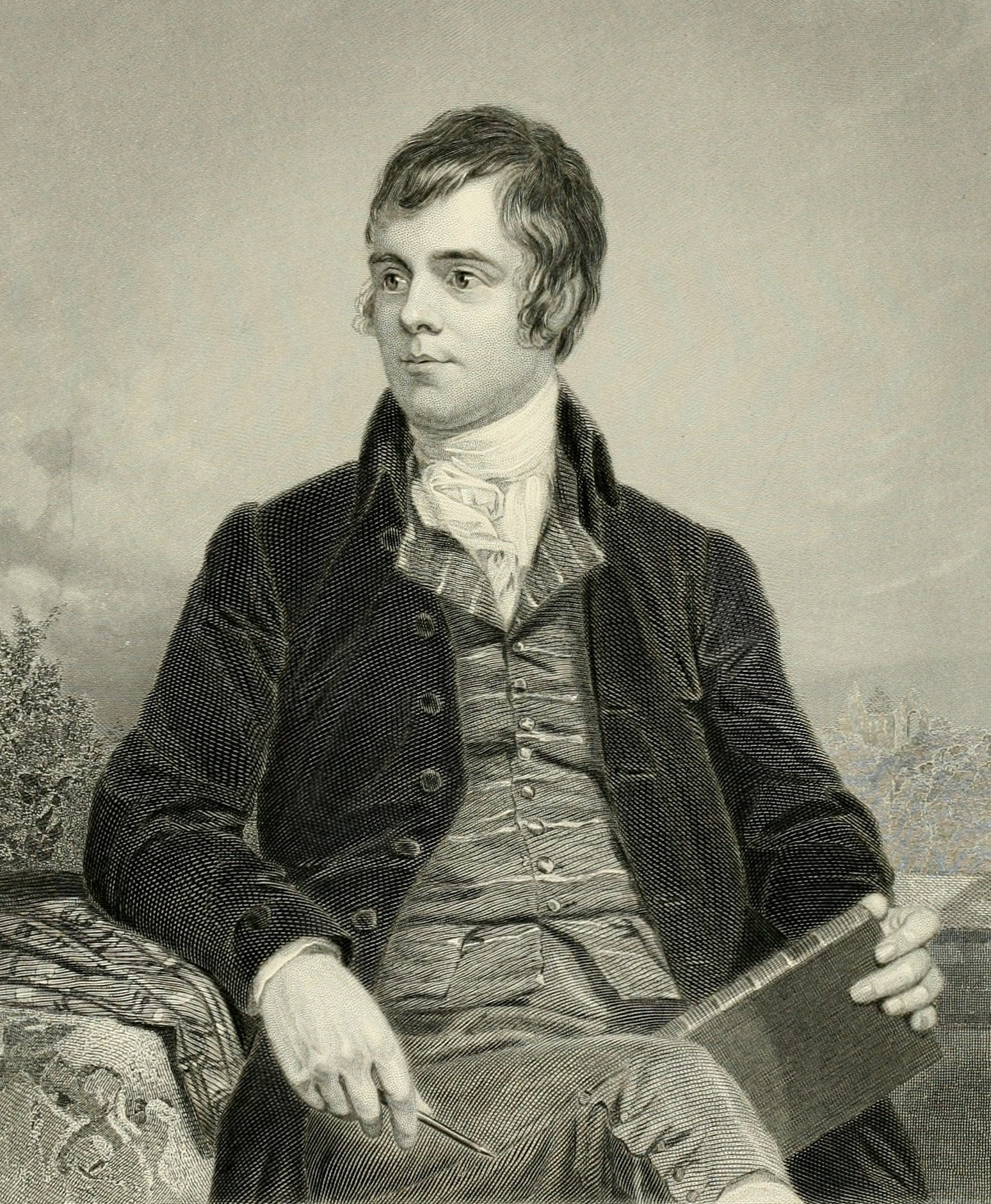
Robert Burns

The following questions give the essence of the approach taken by William Burnes and an insight into the religious terminology and religious attitude of the author. The answers composed by William Burnes are generally extensive and can be found in the specifically cited reference volume.

Son. Dear Father, you have often told me, while you were initiating me into the Christian religion, that you stood bound for me, to give me a Christian education, and recommend a religious life to me. I would therefore, if you please, ask you a few questions that may tend to confirm my faith, and clear its evidences to me.

Father. My Dear Child, with gladness I will resolve to you, (as far as I am able,) any questions you ask; only with this caution, that you will believe my answers, if they are founded in the word of God.

1. How will I evidence to myself that there is a God?
2. If God be possessed of all possible perfection, ought we not then to love him, as well as fear and serve him?
3. Then one would think this were sufficient to determine all men to love God, but how shall we account for so much wickedness in the world?
4. But has God left his own rational offspring thus, to the tyranny of his and their enemy?
5. But by what shall I know that this is a revelation of God, and not a cunningly devised fable?
6. Seeing the Scriptures are proven to be a revelation of God, am not I indispensably bound to believe and obey them?
7. Am I equally bound to obey all the laws delivered to Moses upon Mount Sinai?
8. If the Moral Law be of indispensable obligation, I become bound to perfect and perpetual obedience, of which I am incapable, and on that account cannot hope to be justified and accepted with God
9. Seeing the assistance of the Spirit of God is necessary absolutely for Salvation; hath not God clearly revealed by what mean we may obtain this great blessing?
10. What do you understand by faith?
11. By what shall I know that Jesus Christ is really the person that was prophesied in the Old Testament; or that he was that seed of the woman that was to destroy the kingdom of sin
12. You speak of repentance as absolutely necessary to salvation; I would know what you mean by repentance?
13. I should be glad to hear you at large upon religion giving pleasure to animal life; for it is represented as taking up our cross and following Christ.

== Commentary on the religious beliefs expressed ==
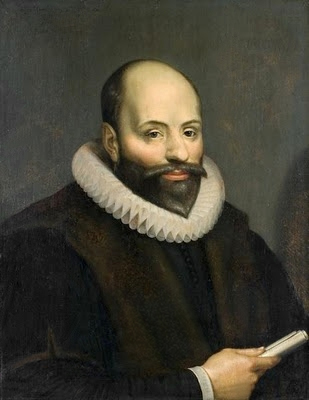
Jacobus Arminius

The paternal affection and that of the son for the father are expressed in the terms "Dear Son and Dear Father". The religious views expressed are more relaxed than rigid Scottish Calvinism and have been compared to Arminianism, named for the 17th-century theologian, Jacobus Arminius, of the University of Leyden. John Calvin insisted on salvation by grace alone whilst Arminians emphasised God's mercy and the freedom of Will, proposing that salvation might be conditional upon an individual good works in life, and that grace can be resisted and lost, that Christ died for all men. The "Auld Licht" orthodox Presbyterians frequently used the term "Arminian" as a criticism of the more liberal views of the 'New Licht' ministers such as William Dalrymple whom Robert Burns mentions in "The Kirk's Alarm":

"D'rymple mild, D'rymple mild,
Though your heart's like a child,
And your life like the new-driven snaw,
Yet that winna save ye,
Auld Satan must have ye,
For preaching that three's ane an' twa."

The pious "Old Cotter" in Burns's The Cotter's Saturday Night is often thought to have been based on William Burnes, but on closer inspection the views he expresses are too severe to match William's liberal theology. The manual for instance insists that pleasure and desire together with the animal soul have a role in Christian life. Such sentiments may have inspired Robert Burns's poetry such as the somewhat controversial lines "the light that led astray, was light from Heaven" delivered by Coila in "The vision", the implications of which were of theological concern to the likes of William Wordsworth.

== See also ==
- Robert Burns's Commonplace Book 1783–1785
- Glenriddell Manuscripts
- Poems, Chiefly in the Scottish Dialect (Edinburgh Edition)
- Poems, Chiefly in the Scottish Dialect (Second Edinburgh Edition)
- Poems, Chiefly in the Scottish Dialect (London Edition)
- Robert Burns's Interleaved Scots Musical Museum
- The Geddes Burns
- Robert Burns World Federation
- Burns Clubs
