= Archbishop (disambiguation) =

An archbishop is a type of priest. Most archbishops are referred to in terms of the area for which they are responsible.

Archbishop may also refer to:

- "The Archbishop", an episode of Blackadder
- Archbishop (chess), a Fairy Chess piece
- Archbishop (dinosaur), a fossil dinosaur which has yet to be properly identified

== See also ==
- All articles beginning with "Archbishop"
