= Exarch (disambiguation) =

An exarch /ˈɛksɑːrk/ is primarily a regional (administrative, military, or ecclesiastical) official in various jurisdictions, both historical and modern:

- Exarch (Roman Empire), a variant name for the office of imperial vicar, a civilian governor of an imperial diocese in the late Roman Empire
- a regional governor in the Byzantine Empire, with both civilian and military powers:
  - Exarch of Africa
  - Exarch of Ravenna
- Ecclesiastical exarch, an ecclesiastical official in various Christian denominations, both historical and modern

In biology, exarch can mean:

- A pattern of Xylem development

In fiction, exarch can mean:

- In the Dark Ages continuation of BattleTech, the title of Exarch is that of the elected chief executive of the Republic of the Sphere.
- In the fictional Warhammer 40,000 universe, the title of Exarch is given to squad leaders of the various Aspect Warrior Shrines of the Eldar race.
- In the fictional Warcraft universe, the title of Exarch is given to military leaders of the Draenei race, as seen in World of Warcraft: The Burning Crusade.
- In Mage: the Awakening, the Exarchs are rumored to be the secret masters of reality, ancient Atlantean mages who ascended to the throne of godhood and now rule the world invisibly through their puppets, the Seers of the Throne.
