= John Beugo =

Scottish engraver and printmaker

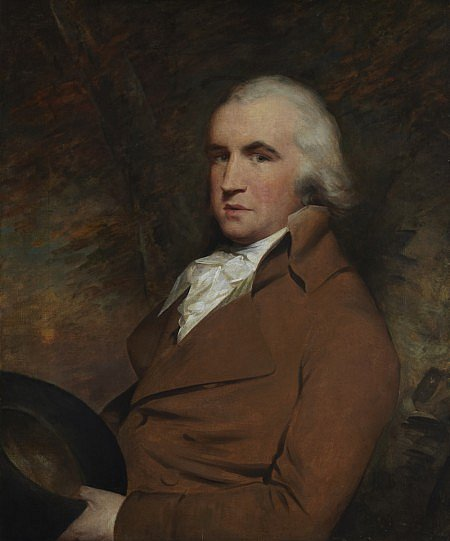
- John Beugo by George Willison.
- Born: 7 May 1759; Edinburgh
- Died: 13 December 1841 (aged 82); Edinburgh
- Occupation: Engraver

John Beugo (7 May 1759 – 13 December 1841) was a Scottish engraver and printmaker. His most famous work was the engraved version of Alexander Nasmyth's portrait of Robert Burns.

== Biography ==
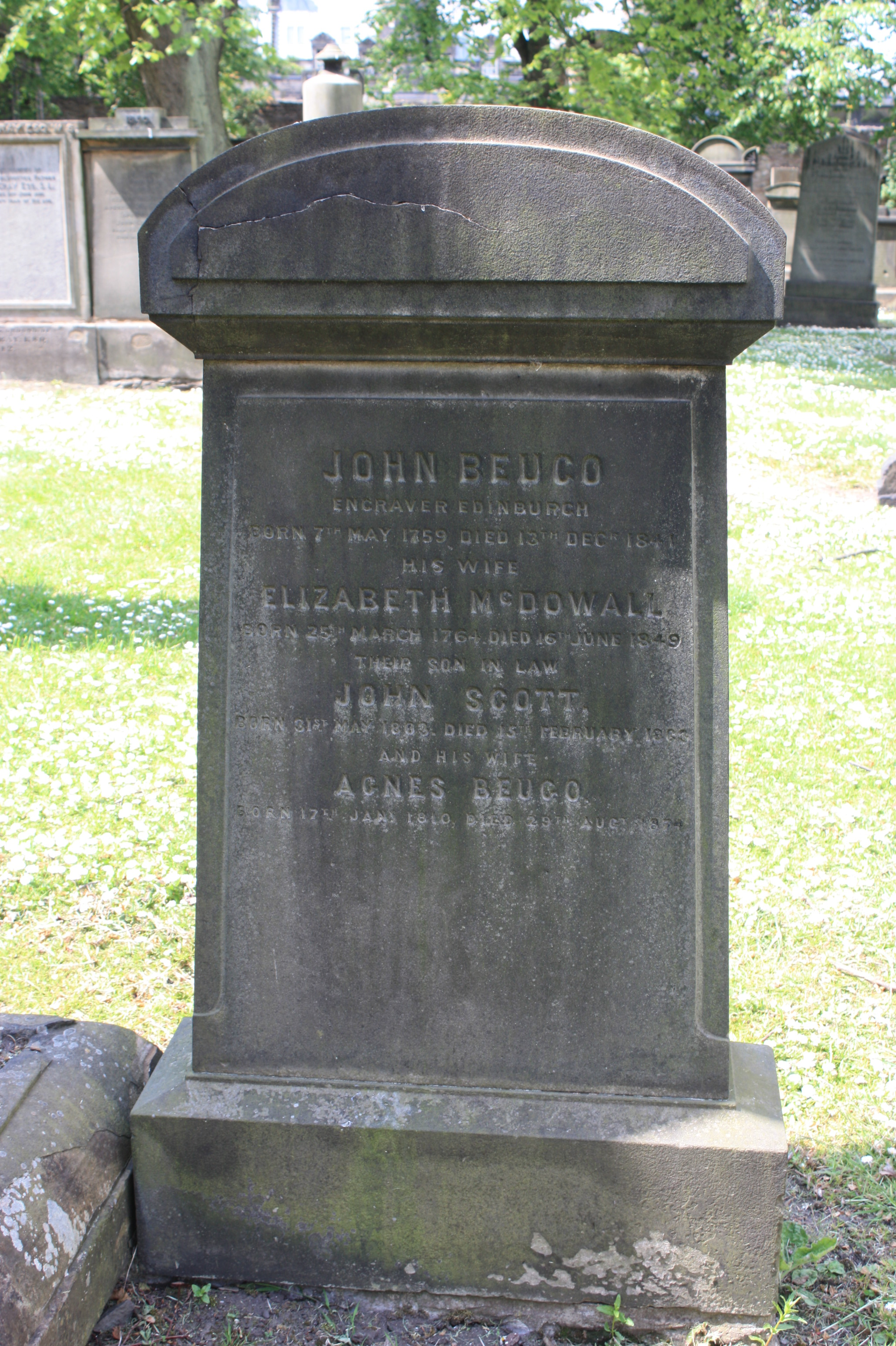
John Beugo's grave, Greyfriars Kirkyard.

Beugo was born in Edinburgh on 7 May 1759.

He was a prosperous reproductive engraver who made prints after the likes of Henry Raeburn, Joshua Reynolds and Alexander Nasmyth. He also made prints after the anatomical works of John Bell. Beugo became the teacher of engraver Robert Charles Bell. He was friends with and engraved portraits of the poet Robert Burns. He published a book called "Poetry, Miscellaneous and Dramatic, by an Artist" in 1797. and The Cabinet or a Natural history of Quadrupeds, Birds, Fishes and Insects (1801) Buego also made notes for the Commercial and the British Linen Banks. He married Elizabeth McDowall in 1808 and together they had one daughter.

His address in 1832 is known to have been 54 South Bridge in the Old Town.

He died in Edinburgh on 13 December 1841 and was buried in Greyfriar's Churchyard. His grave lies to the south side of the church.

== Gallery ==
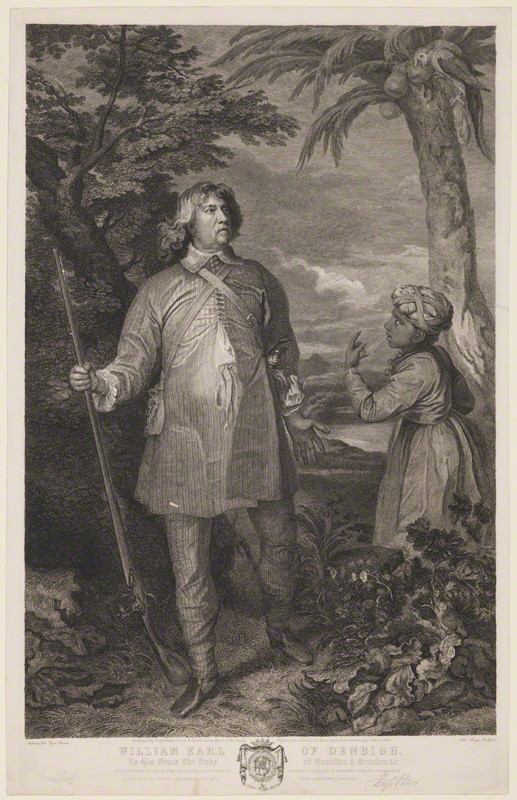

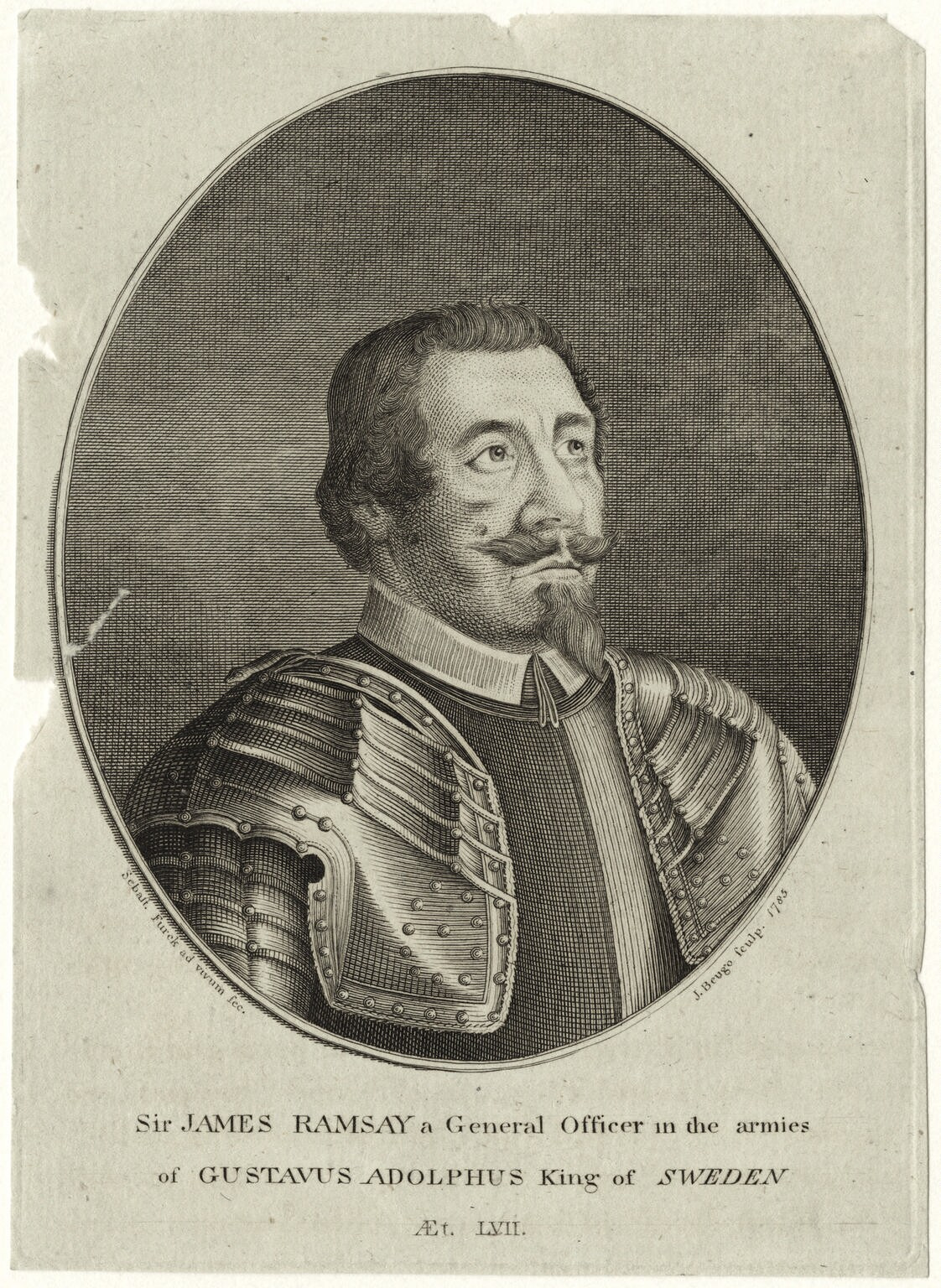

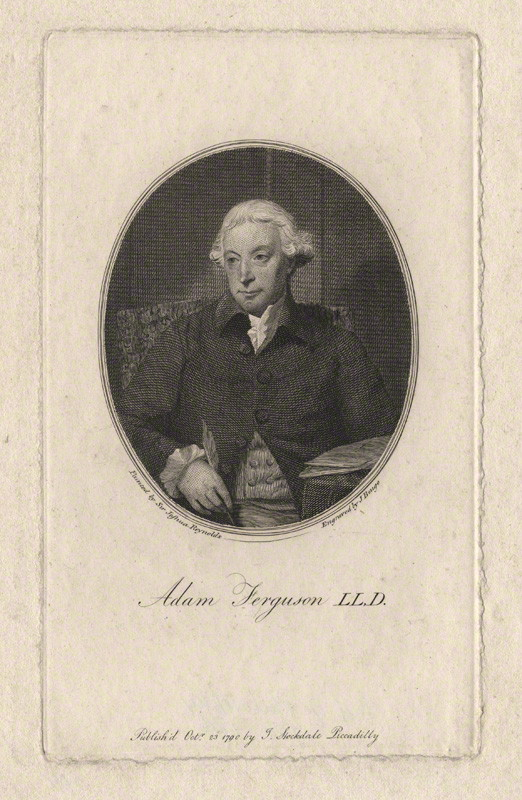

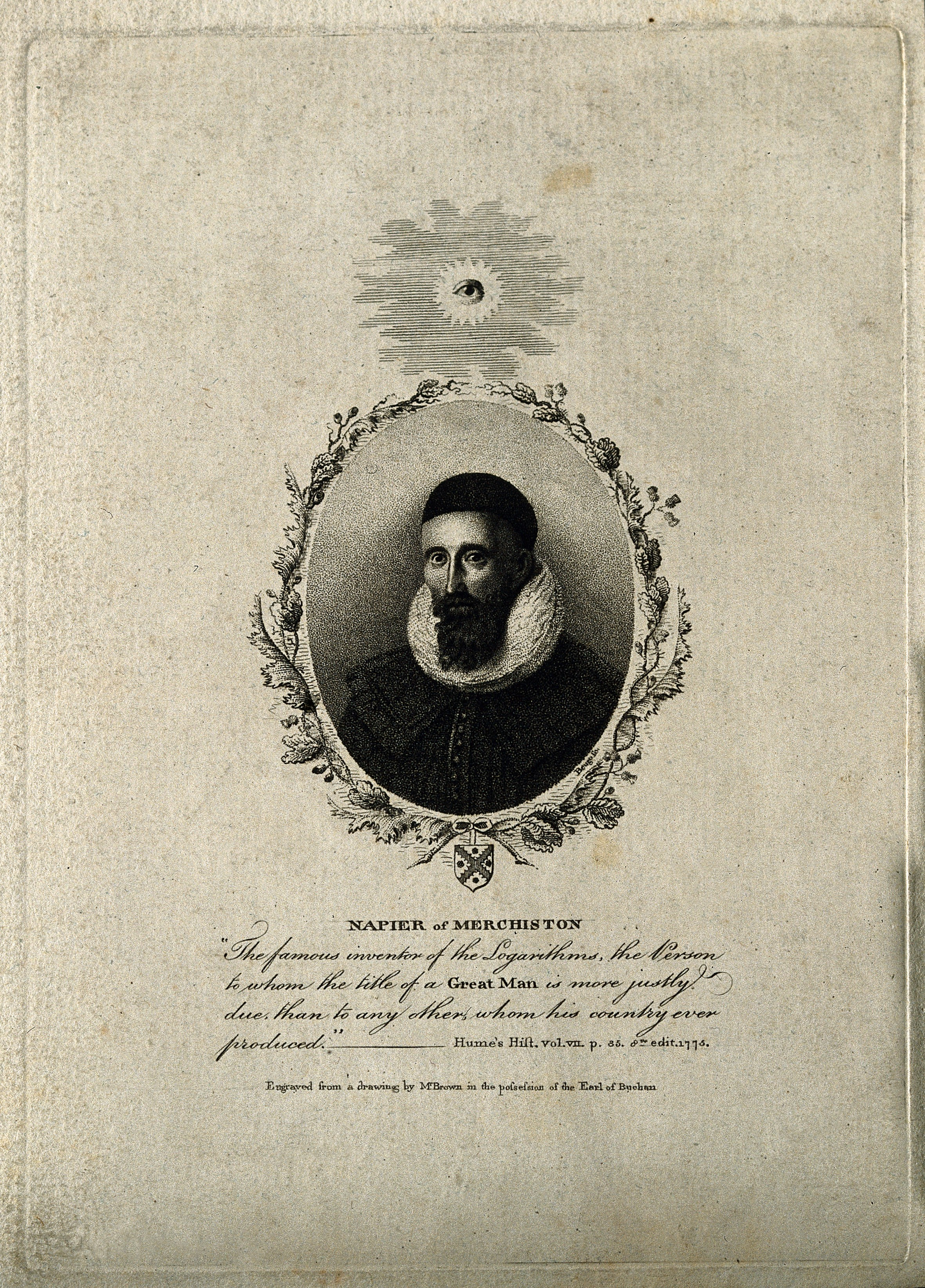

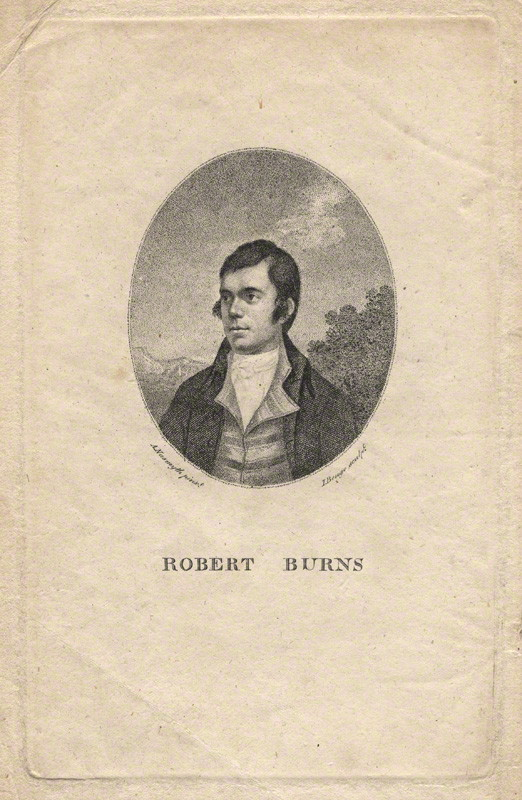
