= The Voice Brasil season 13 =

The Voice Brasil
- Season 13
- Promotional poster featuring coaches Mumuzinho, Matheus & Kauan, Duda Beat, and Péricles, and host Tiago Leifert
- Hosted by: Tiago Leifert; Gaby Cabrini (backstage)
- Coaches: Matheus & Kauan; Duda Beat; Péricles; Mumuzinho
- No. of contestants: 48 artists
- Winner: Thiago Garcia
- Winning coach: Mumuzinho
- Runners-up: Bell Éter; Jamah; Jade Salles
- No. of episodes: 12

Release
- Original network: SBT; Disney+
- Original release: October 6 – December 22, 2025

Season chronology
- ← Previous; Season 12 Next → Season 14

The thirteenth season of the Brazilian reality television series The Voice Brasil premiered on October 6, 2025, at 10:30 p.m. (BRT) on SBT, with a simultaneous stream on Disney+. This season marks the show's first airing on SBT following its cancellation by TV Globo in 2023.

On December 22, 2025, Thiago Garcia, from Team Mumu, won the competition with 41.76% of the public vote, followed by runner-up Bell Éter (Team Duda), third place Jamah (Team Péricles), and fourth place Jade Salles (Team Matheus & Kauan). With this victory, Mumuzinho won his first title in the adult version of the program. Furthermore, he became the second coach in the adult version, after Michel Teló, to win his debut season. Mumuzinho also became the third coach in the program's history to win both the adult and children's versions (he was the winning coach of The Voice Kids season 8), following Carlinhos Brown and Teló.

== Overview ==
=== Development ===
After several rumours, it was revealed on March 14, 2025, that the series would return for its thirteenth season. On April 15, the reboot was officially unveiled by SBT's CEO Daniela Beyruti. Later, on July 18, 2025, the network confirmed that production had begun, with filming commencing on September 2, 2025.

This season debuts a new stage design and expands the broadcast format. Following the television airing on SBT, episodes and exclusive extras, including guest performances, new coach–contestant interactions and reaction videos, stream on Disney+.

=== Coaches and hosts ===
Coaches and Host of The Voice Brasil Season 13

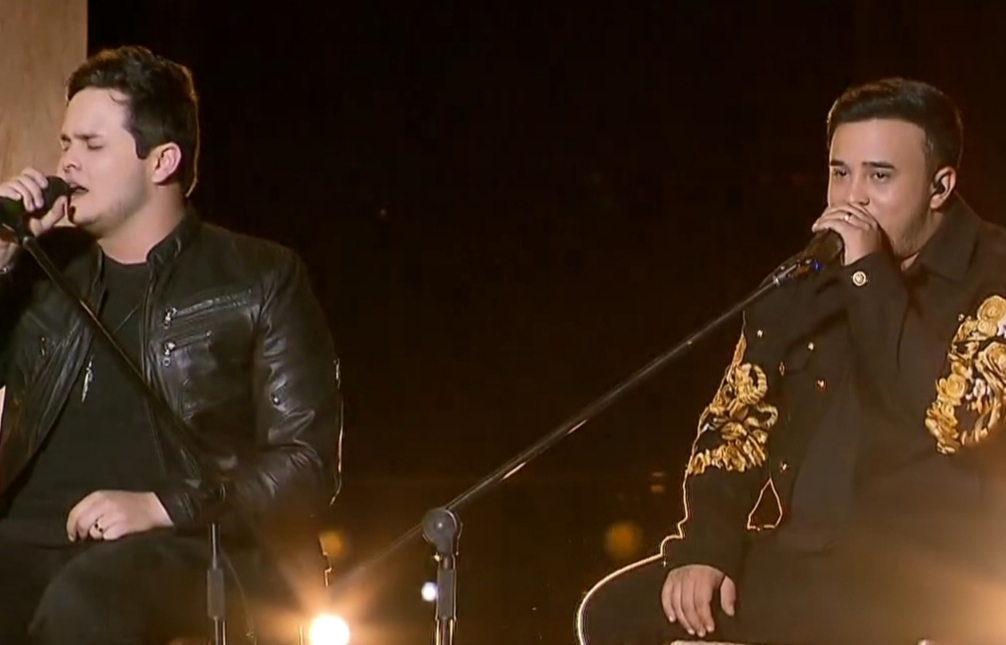
Matheus & Kauan

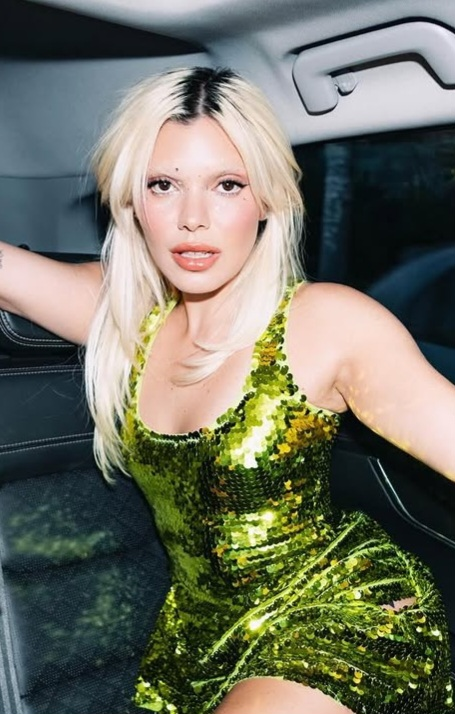
Duda Beat

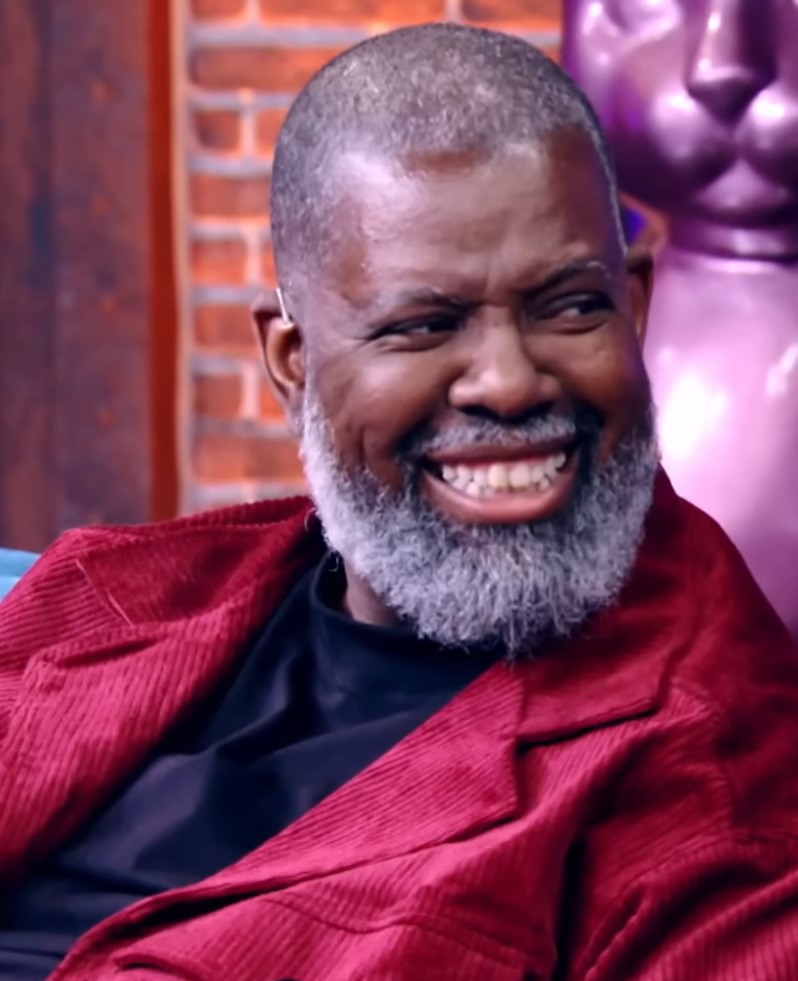
Péricles

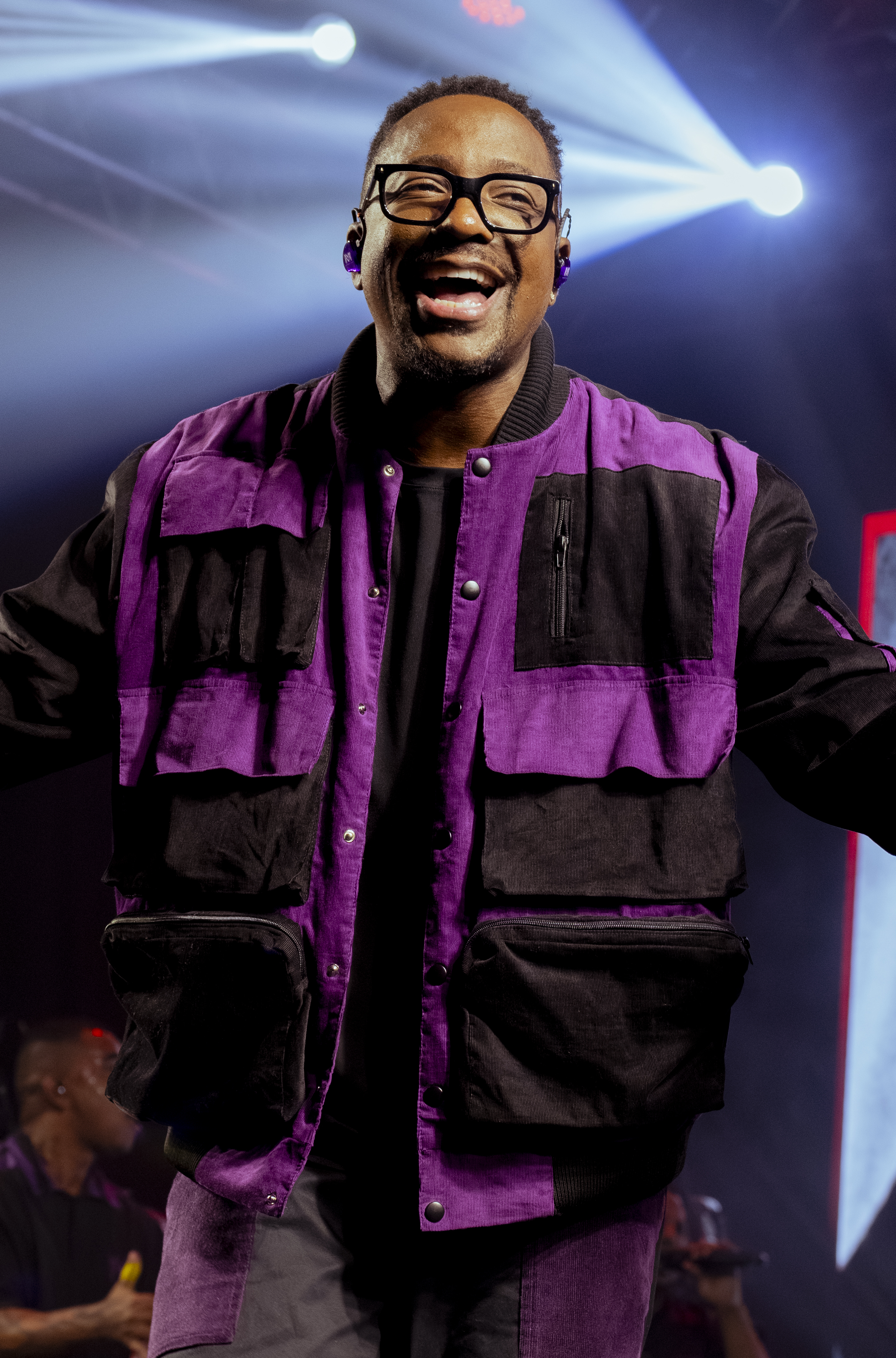
Mumuzinho

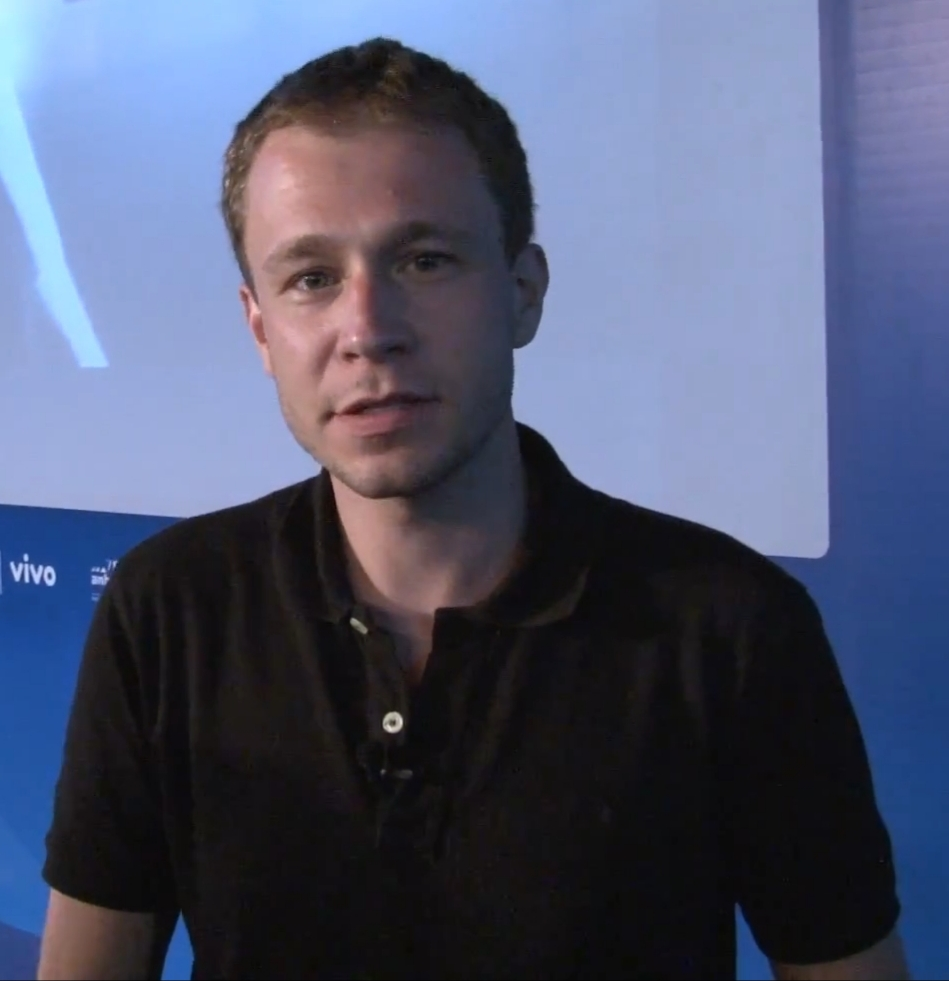
Tiago Leifert

Tiago Leifert returns as host, having previously led the first nine complete seasons of the series. He left the show after recording the blind auditions of the tenth season in 2021, subsequently leaving TV Globo and being replaced by André Marques for the remainder of that season.

Fofocalizando panelist Gaby Cabrini makes her debut as the backstage host, providing behind-the-scenes coverage and exclusive interactions with the contestants.

The coaching panel has been revamped and features pop singer Duda Beat, sertanejo duo Matheus & Kauan, samba artist Mumuzinho and pagode vocalist Péricles.

Mumuzinho is the only coach returning from the previous incarnation of the series, having coached in the first season of The Voice +, won the eighth season of The Voice Kids and also assisted Iza in forming her team during the blind auditions of season 12, as part of the twist introduced in what was then billed as the farewell season of The Voice Brasil. With Lulu Santos leaving the show, the thirteenth season is the first not to feature any coaches from the inaugural season.

== Teams ==
Key

Winner
Runner-up

Eliminated in the Live Shows
Eliminated in the Showdowns

Stolen in the Battles
Eliminated in the Battles

Coaches' teams
Coach	Top 48 Artists				
Matheus & Kauan					
Matheus & Kauan	Jade Salles	André & Luiz Otávio	Raiza & Cris	Dielle Anjos	Gabriel Oliveira
Matheus & Kauan	Enry Sanches	Juli	Erik Escobar	~~Adna Santana~~	Stephanie Lii
Matheus & Kauan	Barbara Kaialla	RosaLu	Michelle & Ariádina	Amanda Santi	
Duda Beat					
Duda Beat	Bell Éter	Lara Vieira	Natascha Falcão	Jezrrel	Nataly Jovió
Duda Beat	Mandáh	Tássya Brielly	Dada Yute	~~Kamatos~~	~~Thales Cesar~~
Duda Beat	~~Juli~~	Enzo Yuki	Luccas Simoneto	Rafaela Pfeifer	
Péricles					
Péricles	Jamah	Thales Cesar	Hector.	Vits	Vitória Laporaes
Péricles	Artu & Leke	Nil Guimarães	Giulia Werner	~~Mandáh~~	Gui Amority
Péricles	Edra Veras	Sara Braz	Isaque Santos	Ster	
Mumuzinho					
Mumuzinho	Thiago Garcia	Gabriel Lima	Ellen Santos	Joana Kezia	Kamatos
Mumuzinho	Adna Santana	Pedro Mussum	Erick Jordan	~~Nataly Jovió~~	~~Enry Sanches~~
Mumuzinho	~~Giulia Werner~~	Gabi Monteiro	Enzo Ferro	Duda Rocha	
Note: Italicized names are artists stolen from another team during the battles (names struck through within former teams). Bold names are recipients of "Rescue" button

== Blind Auditions ==
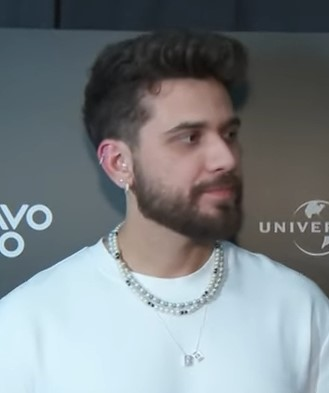
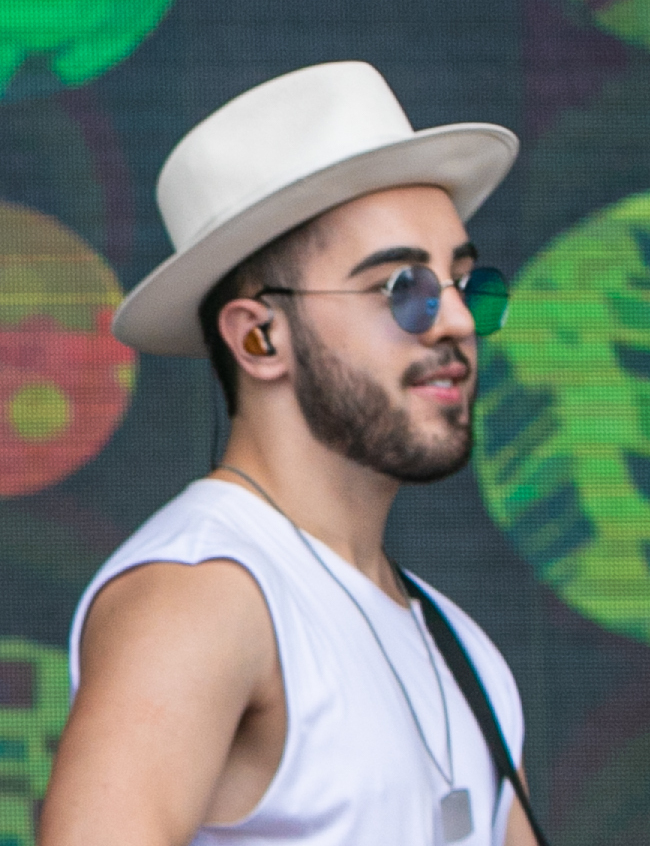
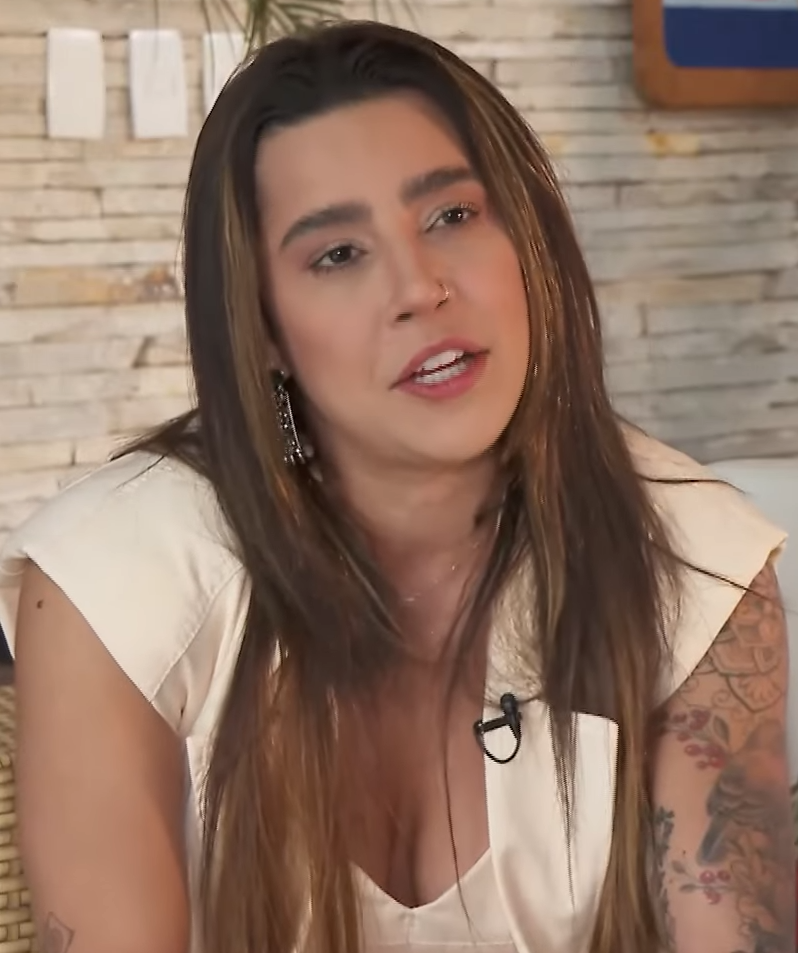
Gustavo Mioto,Rod Melim, Lauana Prado and MC Daniel served as guests.

The season begins with the Blind Auditions on October 6, 2025. During this stage, artists perform while the coaches' chairs are turned away from the stage. If a coach is interested, they press their button to turn around. When only one coach turns, the artist automatically joins their team; if multiple coaches turn, the artist gets to choose. Each coach has two "Blocks" to stop another coach from recruiting a particular artist, and a new "Rescue" feature allows them to bring back one artist who didn’t receive any turns for a second chance. By the end of this round, each coach will have 12 artists, making a total of 48 contestants moving on to the Battles. At the end of the blind auditions, Péricles did not use either of his two blocks, while Mumu only used his block once.

Key

✔	Coach pressed "I WANT YOU" button
	Artist defaulted to this coach's team
	Artist picked a coach's team
	Artist was recipient of the "Rescue" button
	Artist is an 'All Star' contestant
	Artist eliminated with no coach pressing their "I WANT YOU" button
✘	Coach pressed "I WANT YOU" button, but was blocked by another coach from getting the artist
	Blocked by Matheus & Kauan; Blocked by Duda; Blocked by Péricles; Blocked by Mumu

Blind auditions results
Episode	Order	Artist	Age	Hometown	Song	Coach's and contestant's choices			
Episode	Order	Artist	Age	Hometown	Song	Matheus & Kauan	Duda	Péricles	Mumu
Episode 1 (October 06, 2025)	1	Hector.	31	São Paulo	"Meu Lugar"	✔	✔	✔	✘
Episode 1 (October 06, 2025)	2	Natascha Falcão	36	Recife	"Pau de Arara"	—	✔	—	✔
Episode 1 (October 06, 2025)	3	Jamah	39	São Paulo	"Through the Fire"	✔	✔	✔	✔
Episode 1 (October 06, 2025)	4	André & Luiz Otávio	31/32	Boa Esperança	"Apaga, Apaga, Apaga"	✔	✔	✔	✔
Episode 1 (October 06, 2025)	5	Bell Éter	26	Campo Grande	"Love in the Dark"	—	✔	✔	✔
Episode 1 (October 06, 2025)	6	Duda Rocha	27	Brasília	"Daqui Pra Sempre"/"Tattoo"	—	—	—	✔
Episode 1 (October 06, 2025)	7	Jade Salles	29	São Bernardo do Campo	"Sorry Not Sorry"	✔	✔	✔	✔
Episode 1 (October 06, 2025)	8	Gui Amority	18	Aquidauana	"Ele Vive"	✔	—	✔	✔
Episode 1 (October 06, 2025)	9	Enry Sanches	21	Rio de Janeiro	"Vai a 100"	✔	✔	✘	✔
Episode 1 (October 06, 2025)	10	Adna Santana	24	Baraúna	"Nuvem de Lágrimas"	✔	—	—	—
Episode 1 (October 06, 2025)	11	Lilly	32	Porto Alegre	"Estranho"	—	—	—	—
Episode 1 (October 06, 2025)	12	Pedro Mussum	29	Rio de Janeiro	"Perfume"	—	—	—	✔
Episode 1 (October 06, 2025)	13	Tássya Brielly	27	Recife	"Sinais de Fogo"	—	✔	—	—
Episode 2 (October 13, 2025)	1	Artu & Leke	28/23	Uberlândia	"Hackearam-Me"	✔	—	✔	✔
Episode 2 (October 13, 2025)	2	Sara Braz	26	Taubaté	"Stand Up"	✔	✔	✔	✔
Episode 2 (October 13, 2025)	3	Gabi Monteiro	23	Rio de Janeiro	"O Mundo é Um Moinho"	✔	—	—	✔
Episode 2 (October 13, 2025)	4	Amanda Santi	28	Teresina	"O Filho do Dono"	✔	—	—	—
Episode 2 (October 13, 2025)	5	Dada Yute	38	São Paulo	"Samurai"	—	✔	—	—
Episode 2 (October 13, 2025)	6	Rebeca Oliveira	36	Campinas	"Just the Two of Us"	—	—	—	—
Episode 2 (October 13, 2025)	7	Gabriel Lima	28	Rio de Janeiro	"Fica Com Deus"	—	—	—	✔
Episode 2 (October 13, 2025)	8	Michele & Ariádina	30/26	Goiânia	"Dancing Queen"	✔	✔	—	✔
Episode 2 (October 13, 2025)	9	Thales Cesar	26	São Paulo	"É Natural"	—	✔	—	—
Episode 2 (October 13, 2025)	10	Nil Guimarães	30	Ribeirão Preto	"Piece of My Heart"	—	✔	✔	—
Episode 2 (October 13, 2025)	11	Thiago Garcia	40	Rio de Janeiro	"Outono"	—	✔	—	✔
Episode 2 (October 13, 2025)	12	Enzo Yuki	24	Niterói	"Mystical Magical"	✔	✔	—	—
Episode 2 (October 13, 2025)	13	Raiza & Cris	24/22	Timon	"Trevo (Tu)"	✔	—	—	—
Episode 3 (October 20, 2025)	1	Nataly Jovió	28	Várzea Grande	"All by Myself"	✔	✔	✔	✔
Episode 3 (October 20, 2025)	2	Erick Jordan	34	São Paulo	"Melhor Eu Ir"	—	✔	—	✔
Episode 3 (October 20, 2025)	3	Lara Vieira	29	Poços de Caldas	"Por Supuesto"	✔	✔	✔	✔
Episode 3 (October 20, 2025)	4	RosaLu	27/27	Saquarema	"Beija Flor"	✔	—	✔	✔
Episode 3 (October 20, 2025)	5	Ster	28	Fortaleza	"Birds of a Feather"	—	—	✔	—
Episode 3 (October 20, 2025)	6	Fernanda Vasconcellos	27	Rio de Janeiro	"Eu Choro"	—	—	—	—
Episode 3 (October 20, 2025)	7	Gabriel Oliveira	26	Vicente Pires	"Notificação Preferida"	✔	—	—	—
Episode 3 (October 20, 2025)	8	Mandáh	23	Belém	"Run to You"	✔	✔	✔	✔
Episode 3 (October 20, 2025)	9	Juli	29	Criciúma	"Olha"	—	✔	—	—
Episode 3 (October 20, 2025)	10	Enzo Ferro	22	São Paulo	"Castle on the Hill"	—	—	—	✔
Episode 3 (October 20, 2025)	11	Rafaela Pfeifer	29	Porto Alegre	"Love You I Do"	—	✔	✔	✔
Episode 3 (October 20, 2025)	12	Edra Veras	37	Campina Grande	"Forró do Xenhenhém"	—	✔	✔	—
Episode 3 (October 20, 2025)	13	Erik Escobar	46	Sumaré	"Love X Love"	✔	—	—	—
Episode 4 (October 27, 2025)	1	Giulia Werner	20	Rio de Janeiro	"Turning Tables"	✔	✔	✔	✔
Episode 4 (October 27, 2025)	2	Barbara Kaialla	29	Campo do Meio	"Foi Você Quem Trouxe "/("I Want To Know What Love Is")	✔	—	✔	✔
Episode 4 (October 27, 2025)	3	Jezrrel	33	São Paulo	"Apaguei Pra Todos"	—	✔	—	—
Episode 4 (October 27, 2025)	4	Kamatos	34	Rio de Janeiro	"Disk Me"	✔	✔	✔	✔
Episode 4 (October 27, 2025)	5	Joana Kezia	31	Recife	"You Say"	—	✘	—	✔
Episode 4 (October 27, 2025)	6	Rodrigo Lorio	34	Rio de Janeiro	"Pontes Indestrutíveis"	—	—	—	—
Episode 4 (October 27, 2025)	7	Vits	23	Fortaleza	"Tua"	✔	—	✔	—
Episode 4 (October 27, 2025)	8	Stephanie Lii	39	Porto Alegre	"Beautiful Things"	✔	✔	—	—
Episode 4 (October 27, 2025)	9	Vitória Laporaes	23	Vespasiano	"Melhor Lugar"	—	—	✔	✔
Episode 4 (October 27, 2025)	10	Dielle Anjos	25	Guanambi	"Saber Quem Sou "/ "How Far I'll Go"	✔	—	—	—
Episode 4 (October 27, 2025)	11	Isaque Santos	26	Itapevi	"Caso Indefinido"	Team full	—	✔	—
Episode 4 (October 27, 2025)	12	Ellen Santos	21	Belo Horizonte	"Don't You Worry 'bout a Thing"	Team full	✔	Team full	✔
Episode 4 (October 27, 2025)	13	Luccas Simoneto	28	Limeira	"Lose Control"	Team full	✔	Team full	Team full

Non-competition performances
Order	Performers	Song
1.1	Matheus & Kauan, Duda Beat, Péricles, Mumuzinho	"Gita"
1.2	Gustavo Mioto	"Com ou Sem Mim"
2	Rod Melim	"Cupido"
3	Lauana Prado	"Escrito Nas Estrelas"
4	MC Daniel	"Vamo de Pagodin"

== Battles ==
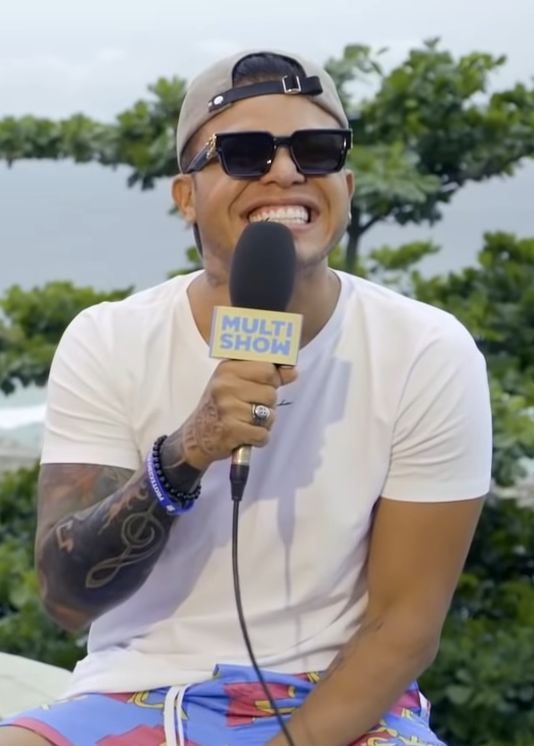
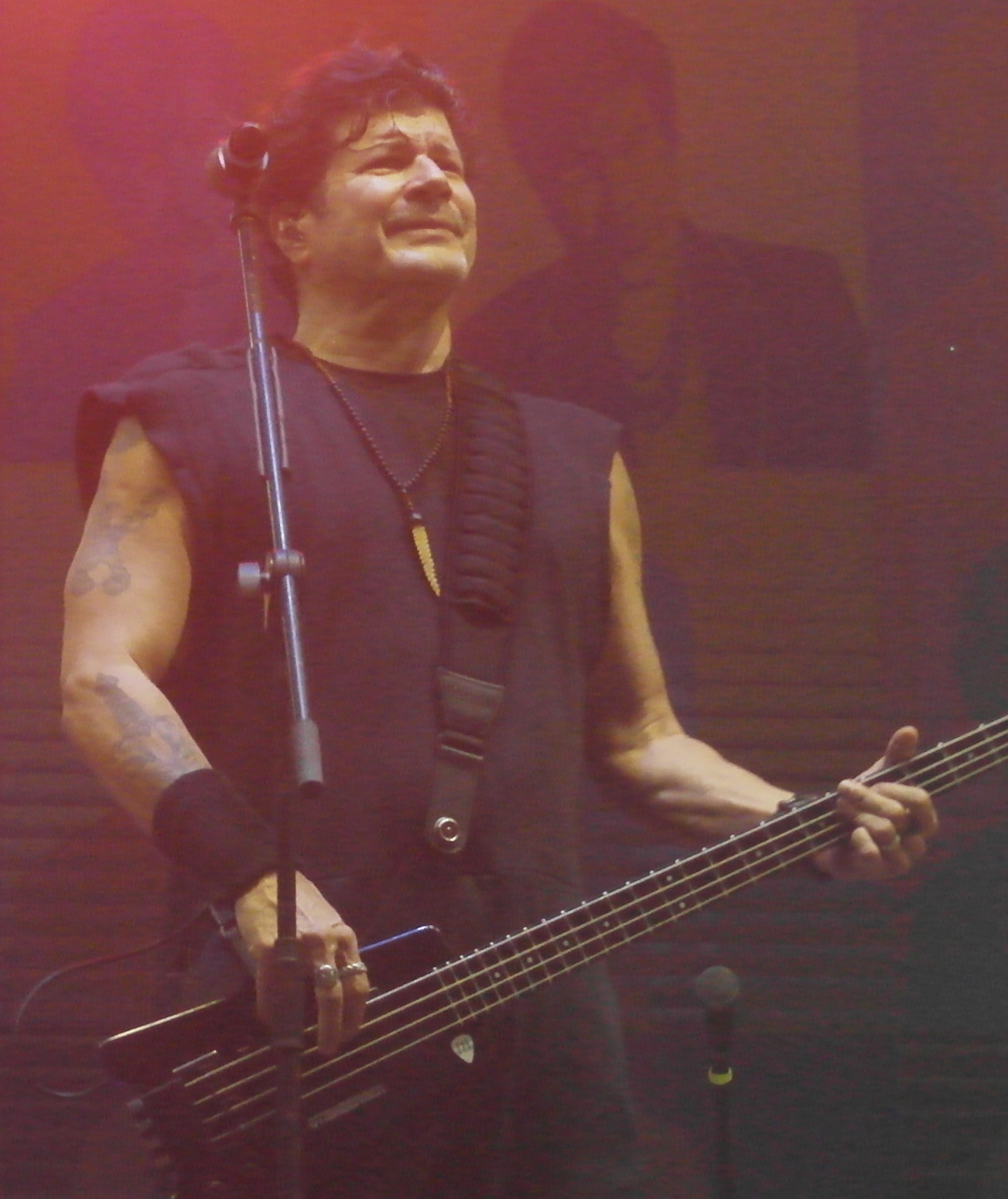
Tierry, Paulo Ricardo, and Léo Foguete served as guests.

The Battle phase began on November 3, 2025 and concluded on November 17, 2025. Each coach puts two artists to duel with the same song. The coach then picks a winner from the battle and the loser is eligible for a "Steal", which allows another coach to bring the losing artist to his/her team. Each coach receives two "Steals".

Artist won the Battle and advanced to the Showndowns
Artist lost the Battle but was stolen by another coach and advanced to the Showndowns
Artist lost the Battle and was eliminated

Battles results
Episode	Coach	Order	Winner	Song	Loser	Steal result			
Episode	Coach	Order	Winner	Song	Loser	Matheus & Kauan	Duda	Péricles	Mumu
Episode 5 (November 03, 2025)	Péricles	1	Jamah	"Love Never Felt So Good"	Mandáh	—	✔	N/A	—
Episode 5 (November 03, 2025)	Duda	2	Natascha Falcão	"O Quereres"	Juli	✔	N/A	—	—
Episode 5 (November 03, 2025)	Mumu	3	Erick Jordan	"Nunca Mais"	Duda Rocha	—	—	—	N/A
Episode 5 (November 03, 2025)	Duda	4	Bell Éter	"Caju"	Thales Cesar	—	N/A	✔	—
Episode 5 (November 03, 2025)	Péricles	5	Vits	"Die with a Smile"	Ster	—	—	N/A	—
Episode 5 (November 03, 2025)	Matheus & Kauan	6	André & Luiz Otávio	"Tudo Que Você Quiser"	Adna Santana	N/A	—	—	✔
Episode 5 (November 03, 2025)	Mumu	7	Pedro Mussum	"All of Me"	Giulia Werner	—	—	✔	N/A
Episode 5 (November 03, 2025)	Matheus & Kauan	8	Dielle Anjos	"Só Você e Eu"	Amanda Santi	N/A	—	Team full	—
Episode 6 (November 10, 2025)	Mumu	1	Gabriel Lima	"Coragem"	Enry Sanches	✔	—	Team full	N/A
Episode 6 (November 10, 2025)	Péricles	2	Artu & Leke	"Amor I Love You"	Isaque Santos	Team full	—	Team full	—
Episode 6 (November 10, 2025)	Matheus & Kauan	3	Gabriel Oliveira	"De Quem é a Culpa?"	Michele & Ariádina	Team full	—	Team full	—
Episode 6 (November 10, 2025)	Péricles	4	Nil Guimarães	"Flowers"	Sara Braz	Team full	—	Team full	—
Episode 6 (November 10, 2025)	Duda	5	Tássya Brielly	"Tangerina"	Rafaela Pfeifer	Team full	N/A	Team full	—
Episode 6 (November 10, 2025)	Mumu	6	Ellen Santos	"True Colors"	Enzo Ferro	Team full	—	Team full	N/A
Episode 6 (November 10, 2025)	Matheus & Kauan	7	Raiza & Cris	"Dois Corações"	RosaLu	Team full	—	Team full	—
Episode 6 (November 10, 2025)	Duda	8	Lara Vieira	"Abracadabra"	Kamatos	Team full	N/A	Team full	✔
Episode 7 (November 17, 2025)	Péricles	1	Hector	"Separação"	Edra Veras	Team full	—	Team full	Team full
Episode 7 (November 17, 2025)	Mumu	2	Joana Kezia	"When You Believe"	Nataly Jovió	Team full	✔	Team full	Team full
Episode 7 (November 17, 2025)	Duda	3	Jezrrel	"Flamingos"	Luccas Simoneto	Team full	Team full	Team full	Team full
Episode 7 (November 17, 2025)	Matheus & Kauan	4	Jade Salles	"Believer"	Barbara Kaialla	Team full	Team full	Team full	Team full
Episode 7 (November 17, 2025)	Duda	5	Dada Yute	"Balada do Amor Inabalável"	Enzo Yuki	Team full	Team full	Team full	Team full
Episode 7 (November 17, 2025)	Mumu	6	Thiago Garcia	"Memória do Prazer"	Gabi Monteiro	Team full	Team full	Team full	Team full
Episode 7 (November 17, 2025)	Péricles	7	Vitória Laporaes	"Apenas Mais Uma de Amor"	Gui Amority	Team full	Team full	Team full	Team full
Episode 7 (November 17, 2025)	Matheus & Kauan	8	Erik Escobar	"The Show Must Go On"	Stephanie Lii	Team full	Team full	Team full	Team full

Non-competition performances
Order	Performers	Song
5	Péricles	"Bixinho"
5.1	Tierry	"Cadê a Localização"
6	Paulo Ricardo	"Rádio Pirata"
7.1	Duda Beat	"Fulminante"
7.2	Léo Foguete	"Beija Beija-Flor"

== The Showdowns ==
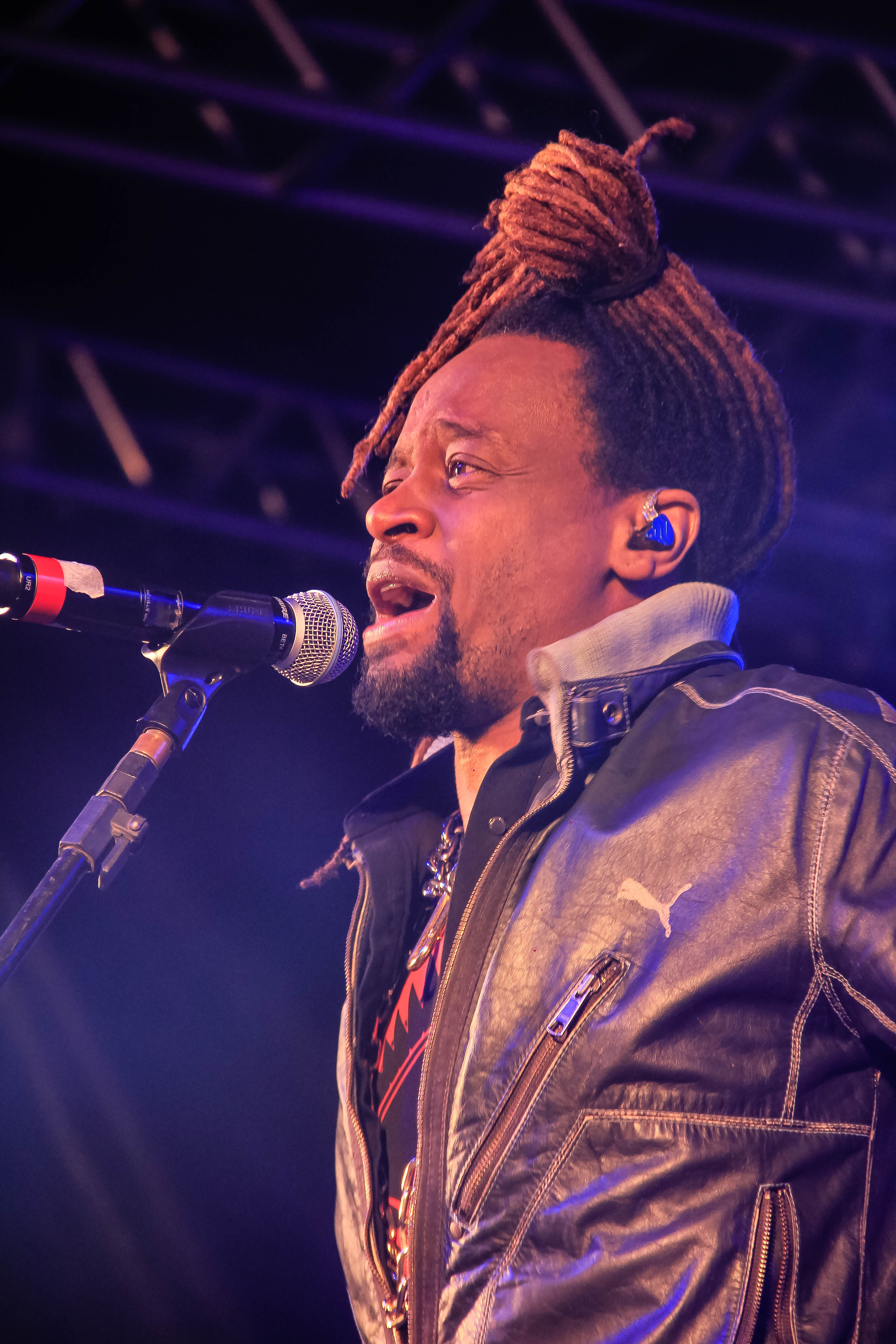
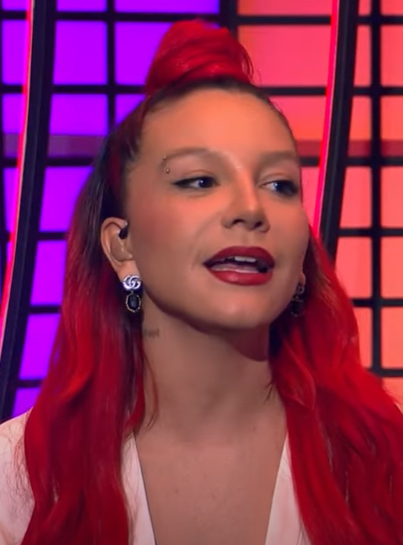
Toni Garrido , Priscilla and Fabi Bang served as a guest.

In this phase, the 32 artists from the 4 coaches perform individually, in trios or duos from each team. The coach chooses the winning artist, who advances to the semi-finals, and the others are eliminated from the competition.

Artist was chosen by their coach and advanced to the Live Finals
Artist was eliminated

Showdowns results
Episode	Coach	Order	Artist	Song	Result
Episode 8 (November 24, 2025)	Duda Beat	1	Bell Éter	"Stay"	Coach's choice
Episode 8 (November 24, 2025)	Duda Beat	2	Dada Yute	"Easy"	Eliminated
Episode 8 (November 24, 2025)	Duda Beat	3	Tássya Brielly	"Reconvexo"	Eliminated
Episode 8 (November 24, 2025)	Matheus & Kauan	4	André & Luiz Otávio	"Cuida Bem Dela"	Coach's choice
Episode 8 (November 24, 2025)	Matheus & Kauan	5	Erik Escobar	"Outstanding"	Eliminated
Episode 8 (November 24, 2025)	Matheus & Kauan	6	Juli	"Pagu"	Eliminated
Episode 8 (November 24, 2025)	Péricles	7	Giulia Werner	"Rise Up"	Eliminated
Episode 8 (November 24, 2025)	Péricles	8	Nil Guimarães	"Proud Mary"	Eliminated
Episode 8 (November 24, 2025)	Péricles	9	Thales Cesar	"Apaga a Luz"	Coach's choice
Episode 8 (November 24, 2025)	Mumuzinho	10	Erick Jordan	"Um Dia,Um Adeus"	Eliminated
Episode 8 (November 24, 2025)	Mumuzinho	11	Gabriel Lima	"Flashback"	Coach's choice
Episode 8 (November 24, 2025)	Mumuzinho	12	Pedro Mussum	"I'm Not the Only One"	Eliminated
Episode 9 (December 01, 2025)	Péricles	1	Artu & Leke	"Deixa Tudo Como Tá"	Eliminated
Episode 9 (December 01, 2025)	Péricles	2	Hector	"Lembrei de Nós"	Coach's choice
Episode 9 (December 01, 2025)	Péricles	3	Vitória Laporaes	"Feliz,Alegre e Forte"	Eliminated
Episode 9 (December 01, 2025)	Mumuzinho	4	Adna Santana	"Você Mudou"	Eliminated
Episode 9 (December 01, 2025)	Mumuzinho	5	Kamatos	"Bang"	Eliminated
Episode 9 (December 01, 2025)	Mumuzinho	6	Thiago Garcia	"Drão"	Coach's choice
Episode 9 (December 01, 2025)	Duda Beat	7	Mandáh	"Diamonds"	Eliminated
Episode 9 (December 01, 2025)	Duda Beat	8	Natascha Falcão	"Banquete de Signos"	Coach's choice
Episode 9 (December 01, 2025)	Duda Beat	9	Nataly Jovió	"Never Enough"	Eliminated
Episode 9 (December 01, 2025)	Matheus & Kauan	10	Enry Sanches	"Me Bloqueia"	Eliminated
Episode 9 (December 01, 2025)	Matheus & Kauan	11	Jade Salles	"Oscar Winning Tears"	Coach's choice
Episode 9 (December 01, 2025)	Matheus & Kauan	12	Gabriel Oliveira	"Estrela Perdida"	Eliminated
Episode 10 (December 08, 2025)	Mumuzinho	1	Ellen Santos	"Um Mundo Ideal" ("A Whole New World")	Coach's choice
Episode 10 (December 08, 2025)	Mumuzinho	2	Joana Kezia	"Parte do Seu Mundo" ("Part of Your World")	Eliminated
Episode 10 (December 08, 2025)	Duda Beat	3	Jezrrel	"No Meu Coração Você Vai Sempre Estar" ("You'll Be in My Heart")	Eliminated
Episode 10 (December 08, 2025)	Duda Beat	4	Lara Vieira	"Can You Feel the Love Tonight"	Coach's choice
Episode 10 (December 08, 2025)	Péricles	5	Jamah	"Ninguém Me Cala" ("Speechless")	Coach's choice
Episode 10 (December 08, 2025)	Péricles	6	Vits	"Sentimentos São" ("Beauty and the Beast")	Eliminated
Episode 10 (December 08, 2025)	Matheus & Kauan	7	Dielle Anjos	"Livre Estou" ("Let It Go")	Eliminated
Episode 10 (December 08, 2025)	Matheus & Kauan	8	Raiza & Cris	"Amigo Estou Aqui" ("You've Got a Friend in Me")	Coach's choice

Non-competition performances
Order	Performers	Song
8	Mumuzinho	"Te Assumi Pro Brasil"
8.1	Toni Garrido	"Me Libertei"
9.1	Matheus & Kauan	"Até Que Durou"
9.2	Priscilla	"Boyzinho"
10.1	Matheus & Kauan, Duda Beat, Péricles, Mumuzinho	"Ciclo Sem Fim" ("Circle of Life")
10.2	Fabi Bang	"Parte do Seu Mundo" ("Part of Your World")

== Live Shows ==
=== Semifinals ===
Artist was chosen by their coach and advanced to the Finals
Artist was eliminated
Artist save by public vote.

Semifinals results
Episode	Coach	Order	Artist	Song	Result
Episode 11 (December 15, 2025)	Matheus & Kauan	1	André & Luiz Otávio	"Facas"	Public's vote
Episode 11 (December 15, 2025)	Matheus & Kauan	2	Jade Salles	"Unstoppable"	Coach's choice
Episode 11 (December 15, 2025)	Matheus & Kauan	3	Raiza & Cris	"Eu Só Quero um Xodó"	Eliminated
Episode 11 (December 15, 2025)	Mumuzinho	4	Ellen Santos	"Into You"	Eliminated
Episode 11 (December 15, 2025)	Mumuzinho	5	Gabriel Lima	"Ainda Bem"	Coach's choice
Episode 11 (December 15, 2025)	Mumuzinho	6	Thiago Garcia	"Codinome Beija-Flor"	Public's vote
Episode 11 (December 15, 2025)	Péricles	7	Hector.	"Desafio"	Eliminated
Episode 11 (December 15, 2025)	Péricles	8	Jamah	"Sweet Love"	Coach's choice
Episode 11 (December 15, 2025)	Péricles	9	Thales Cesar	"Supera"	Public's vote
Episode 11 (December 15, 2025)	Duda Beat	10	Bell Éter	"Flutua"	Coach's choice
Episode 11 (December 15, 2025)	Duda Beat	11	Lara Vieira	"Penhasco"	Public's vote
Episode 11 (December 15, 2025)	Duda Beat	12	Natascha Falcão	"Melhor Assim"	Eliminated

=== Round 1: Finals ===
Artist was chosen by their coach and advanced
Artist was eliminated

Round 1: Finals results
Episode	Coach	Order	Artist	Song	Result
Episode 12 (December 22, 2025)	Péricles	1	Jamah	"If I Ain't Got You"	Coach's choice
Episode 12 (December 22, 2025)	Péricles	2	Thales Cesar	"Zero a Cem"	Eliminated
Episode 12 (December 22, 2025)	Matheus & Kauan	3	André & Luiz Otávio	"Tá Chorando Por Quê?"	Eliminated
Episode 12 (December 22, 2025)	Matheus & Kauan	4	Jade Salles	'Dream On"	Coach's choice
Episode 12 (December 22, 2025)	Duda Beat	5	Bell Éter	'Somebody to Love"	Coach's choice
Episode 12 (December 22, 2025)	Duda Beat	6	Lara Vieira	"Love by Grace"	Eliminated
Episode 12 (December 22, 2025)	Mumuzinho	7	Gabriel Lima	"Até O Sol Quis Ver"	Eliminated
Episode 12 (December 22, 2025)	Mumuzinho	8	Thiago Garcia	"Veludo Marrom"	Coach's choice

=== Round 2: Finals ===
Winner
Runner-up
Third place
Fourth place

Round 2: Finals results
Episode	Coach	Order	Artist	Song	Result
Episode 12 (December 22, 2025)	Duda Beat	1	Bell Éter	"Sobrevivi"	Runner-up
Episode 12 (December 22, 2025)	Matheus & Kauan	2	Jade Salles	"Quero Você do Jeito Que Quiser"	Fourth place
Episode 12 (December 22, 2025)	Péricles	3	Jamah	"O Que é o Amor"	Third place
Episode 12 (December 22, 2025)	Mumuzinho	4	Thiago Garcia	"Coleção"	Winner (41.76%)

== Elimination chart ==
Teams colour key

- Team Matheus & Kauan
- Team Duda
- Team Péricles
- Team Mumu

Results colour key

- Winner
- Runner-up
- Third place
- Fourth place
- Saved by public vote
- Eliminated
- Saved by their coach

Results
Artist	Semifinal	Finale
Thiago Garcia	Safe	Winner
Bell Éter	Safe	Runner-up
Jamah	Safe	Third place
Jade Salles	Safe	Fourth place
Gabriel Lima	Safe	Eliminated
Lara Vieira	Safe	Eliminated
André & Luiz Otávio	Safe	Eliminated
Thales Cesar	Safe	Eliminated
Natascha Falcão	Eliminated	Eliminated (Semifinals)
Hector.	Eliminated	Eliminated (Semifinals)
Ellen Santos	Eliminated	Eliminated (Semifinals)
Raiza & Cris	Eliminated	Eliminated (Semifinals)

=== Per team ===
Elimination chart for The Voice Brazil season 13 per team
Artists	Semifinal	Finale
Jade Salles	Advanced	Fourth place
André & Luiz Otávio	Advanced	Eliminated
Raiza & Cris	Eliminated	
Bell Éter	Advanced	Runner-up
Lara Vieira	Advanced	Eliminated
Natascha Falcão	Eliminated	
Jamah	Advanced	Third place
Thales Cesar	Advanced	Eliminated
Hector.	Eliminated	
Thiago Garcia	Advanced	Winner
Gabriel Lima	Advanced	Eliminated
Ellen Santos	Eliminated	

== Ratings and reception ==
=== Brazilian ratings ===
All numbers are in points and provided by Kantar Ibope Media.

Episode	Title	Air date	Timeslot (BRT)	SP viewers (in points)	Source
1	Blind Auditions 1	October 6, 2025	Monday 10:30 p.m.	4.1	
2	Blind Auditions 2	October 13, 2025	Monday 10:30 p.m.		
3	Blind Auditions 3	October 20, 2025	Monday 10:30 p.m.		
4	Blind Auditions 4	October 27, 2025	Monday 10:30 p.m.		

- In 2025, each point represents 270.631 households in 15 market cities in Brazil (77.488 households in São Paulo).
