= 2020 Nickelodeon Meus Prêmios Nick =

2020 Brazilian award show

2020 Meus Prêmios Nick
- Date: September 27, 2020
- Location: São Paulo
- Country: Brazil
- Hosted by: Bruno Gagliasso
- Most awards: Manu Gavassi (6)
- Most nominations: Manu Gavassi (6)
- Website: meuspremiosnick.com.br

Television/radio coverage
- Network: Nickelodeon

The 2020 Meus Prêmios Nick Awards were held on September 27, 2020, in São Paulo, Brazil. Due to the ongoing coronavirus pandemic, the event did not have an audience and was broadcast live on television and on Nickelodeon's social media networks simultaneously.

== Winners and nominees ==
Nominees were revealed on July 22, 2020. Singer and actress Manu Gavassi is the most-nominated with six nominations to her name. Maísa Silva is the second most-nominated with 5, and Larissa Manoela and Any Gabrielly each have 4. On August 13, the finalists were announced, in addition to having opened the voting for the 2nd phase with 3 new categories and Manu Gavassi is still the most nominated with now 5 categories.

Indicates the winner within each category.

Female TV Artist	Male TV Artist
Marina Ruy Barbosa; Maisa; Larissa Manoela; Sophia Valverde	João Guilherme; Lucas Burgatti; Felipe Simas; Caio Castro
Favorite Music Artist	Favorite International Artist
Manu Gavassi; Pabllo Vittar; Anitta; Melim	Now United; BTS; Billie Eilish; Camila Cabello
Favorite YouTube Channel	Gamer of the Year
Enaldinho; Rezendeevil; Loud; Camila Loures	Flakes Power; TazerCraft; Cherryrar; Ingredy Barbi Games
Fandom of the Year	Favorite National Hit
Uniters (Now United); Avocados (Billie Eilish); BTS Army (BTS); Blink (Blackpink)	"Áudio de Desculpas" – Manu Gavassi; "Fica" – BFF Girls; "Menina Solta" – Giulia Be; "Bambolê" – Camila Loures e MC WM
Favorite International Hit	Inspiration of the Year
"Come Together" – Now United; "Everything I Wanted" – Billie Eilish; "Break My Heart" – Dua Lipa; "How You Like That" – Blackpink	Manu Gavassi; Any Gabrielly; Larissa Manoela; Bruna Marquezine
Instagram of the Year	TikToker of the Year
Manu Gavassi; Maisa; Larissa Manoela; Any Gabrielly	Any Gabrielly; Maisa; Camilla de Lucas; Doarada
Style of the Year	Favorite Cartoon
Manu Gavassi; JP Mota; João Guilherme; Luh Setra	Bob Esponja; The Loud House; O Incrível Mundo de Gumball; Os Jovens Titãs em Ação
Favorite TV Show	Favorite Nickelodeon TV Show
Bia; Henry Danger; Programa da Maisa; As Aventuras de Poliana	Henry Danger; Bob Esponja; Sam & Cat; The Thundermans
Movie of the Year	Best Live
Modo Avião; Ele disse, Ela disse; Frozen 2; Jumanji - Próxima Fase	Marília Mendonça; Alok; Larissa Manoela; Melim
