= List of cover versions of Shakira songs =

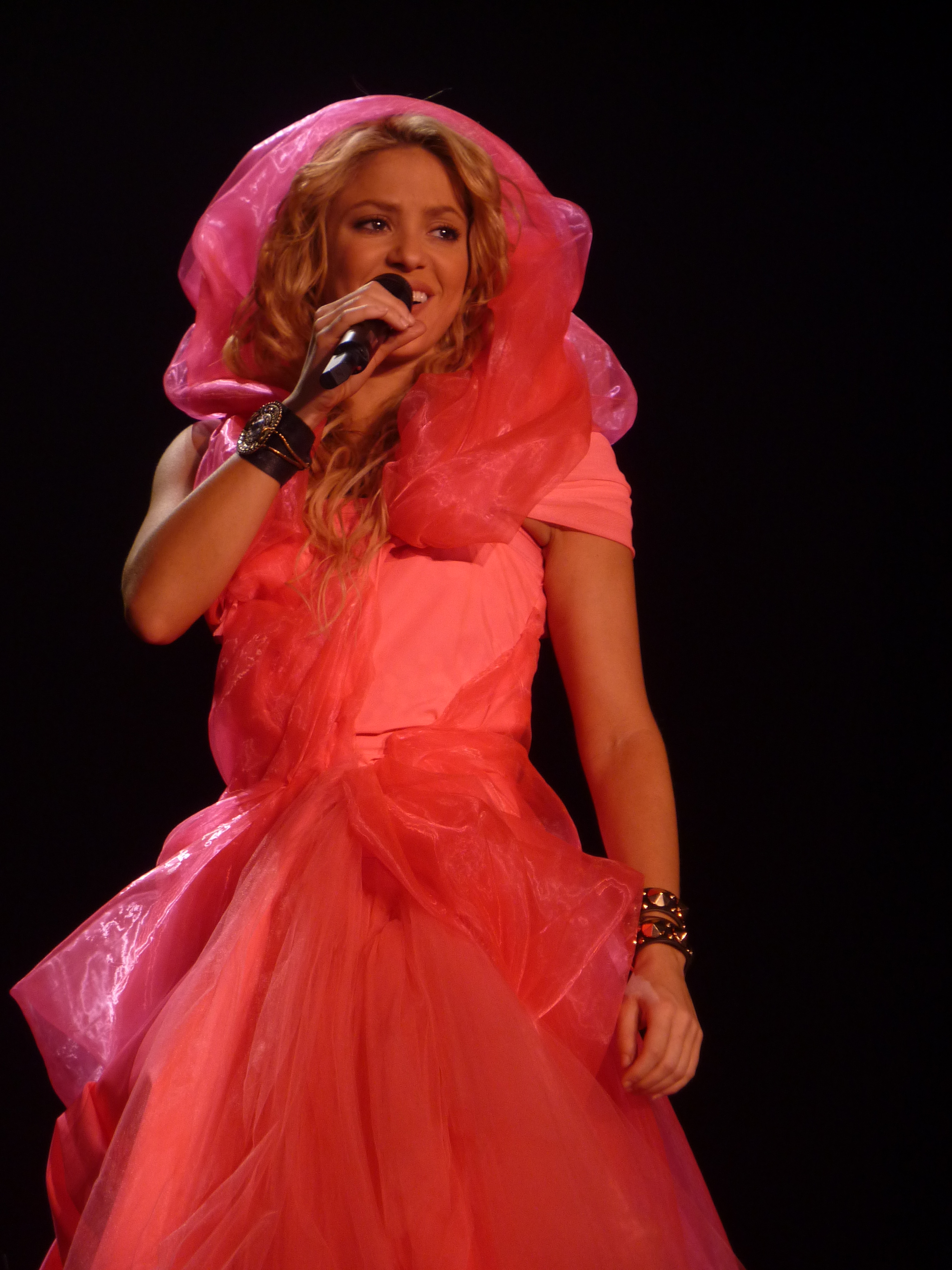
Various artists have covered Shakira's greatest hits.

This is a list of notable music artists who have recorded one or more songs written and recorded by Colombian singer-songwriter Shakira. Many artists started covering her songs as early as the 2000s. These versions are recorded in different styles and some in another language.

According to journalist Ana Bejarano, Shakira has been the soundtrack of an entire generation, focusing its impact on Colombian society at the time. According to Billboard, Shakira's songs can range from heartbreaking ballads to "pop anthems".

Songs like "Whenever Wherever", "Waka Waka" and "Hips Don't Lie" which were Shakira's biggest hits worldwide are the most covered while the most covered song in Spanish is "Ojos Así" by various artists from countries outside the continent and being used as a soundtrack for Middle Eastern movies. Artists like Li Yuchun were discovered thanks to a cover of Shakira performed on talent shows in the early 2000s.

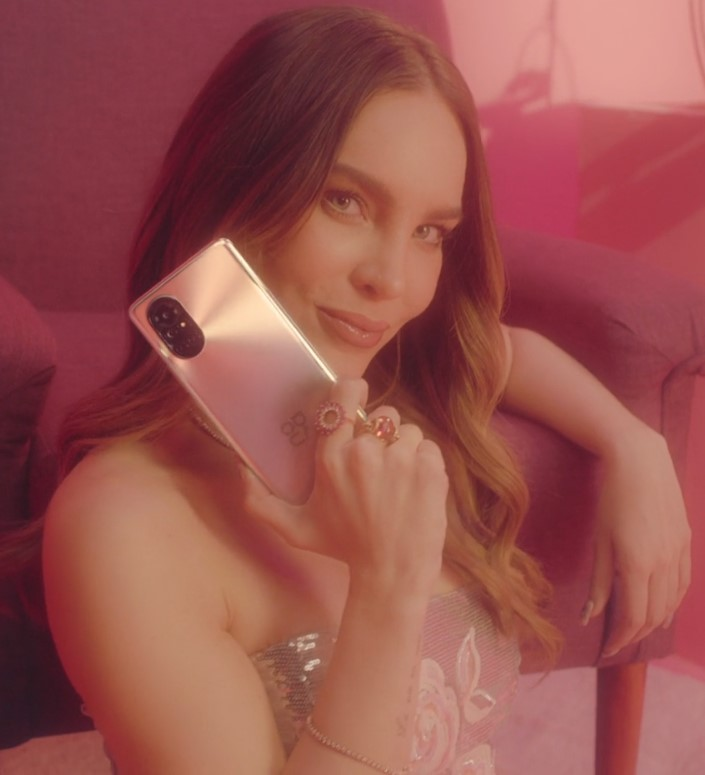
Belinda performed Shakira songs at concerts and auditions.

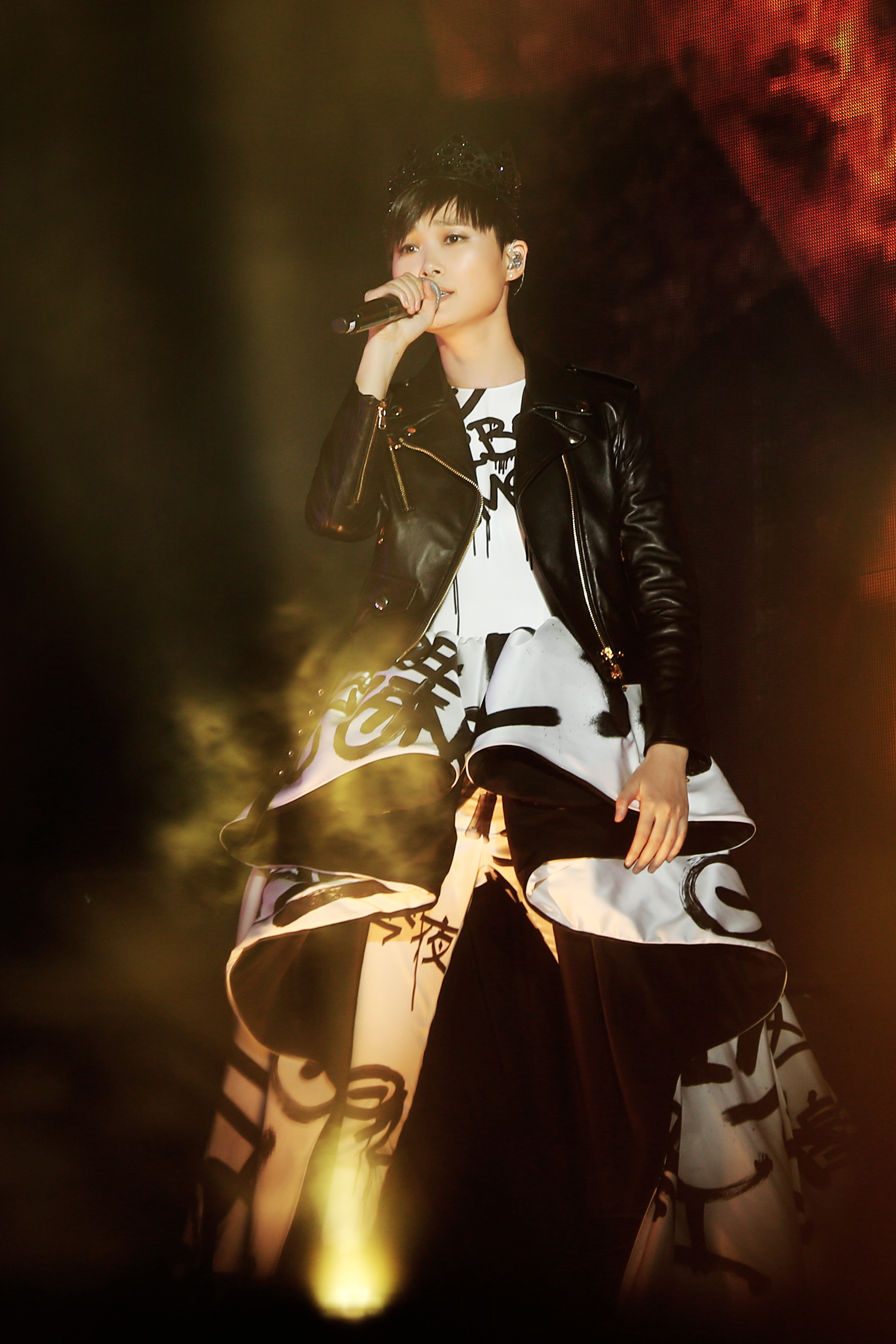
Singer Li Yuchun was discovered thanks to her cover of Shakira.

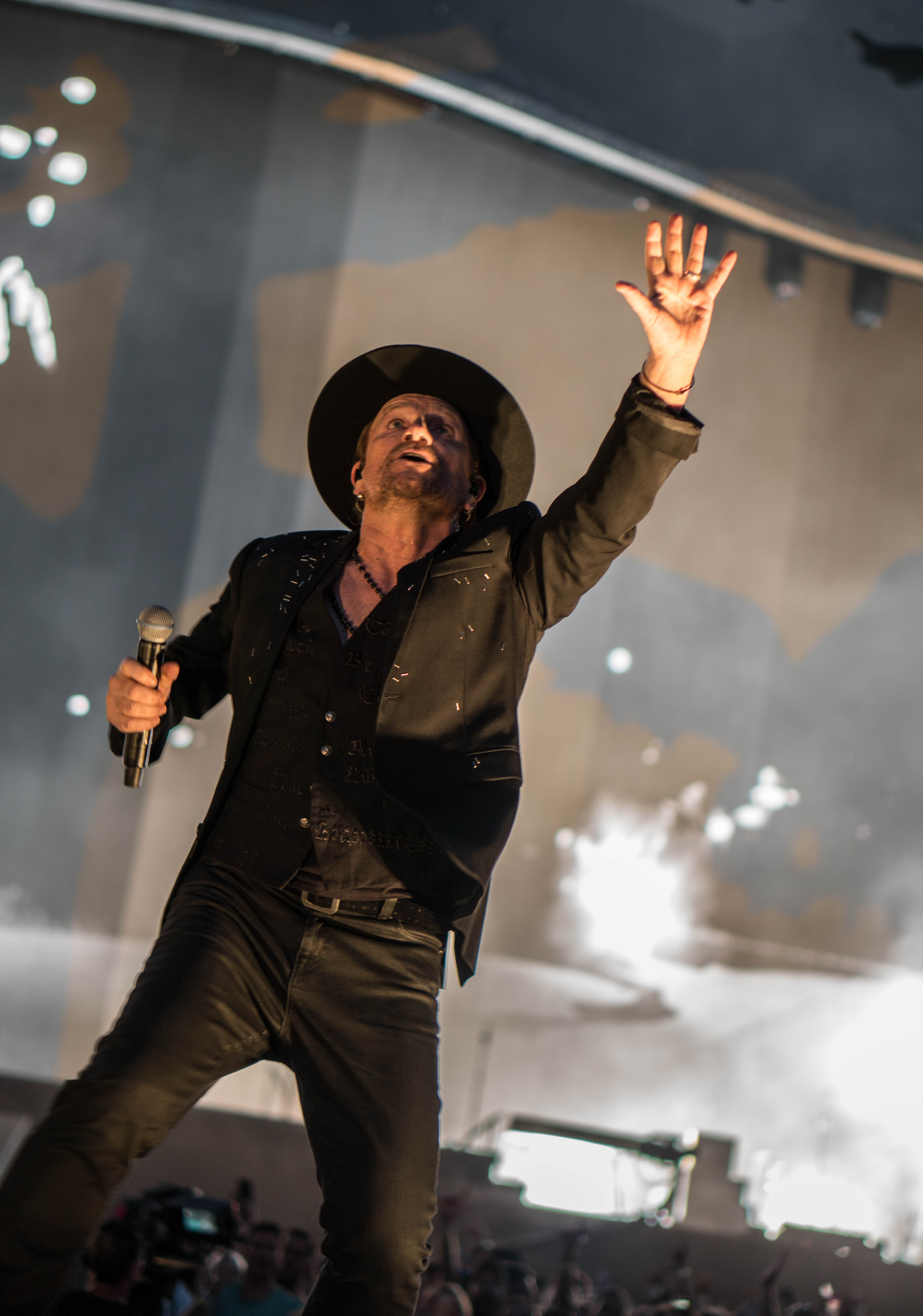
The Irish band U2 covered Shakira during their concert in 2017.

== Selected list ==
Artist	Country of origin	First Year of Appearance	Song	Appearance(s)	Note(s)
Gilberto Santa Rosa	Puerto Rico	2011	"La Tortura"	Latin Grammys Tribute	
Belinda	Mexico	2006	"Hips Don't Lie"	MTV Latino Awards	
Belinda	Mexico	2021	"Estoy Aquí"	Audition	
Natasa Theodoridou	Greece	2001	"Ojos Así"	Album	
Manel	Spain	2010	"La Tortura"	Concert	
Marquess	Germany	2016	"Whenever, Wherever"	Album	
The Fray	United States	2007	"Hips Don't Lie"	Album	
Milly Quezada	Dominican Republic	2014	"Lo Que Más"	Single	
Milena Warthon	Peru	2021	"Whenever, Wherever"	Audition	
Li Yuchun	China	2001	"Underneath Your Clothes"	Audition	
Li Yuchun	China	2015	"Ojos Así"	Concert	
Zhou Shen	China	2021	"Try Everything"	Album	
Jane Zhang; Jocelyn Chan Ming Hei	China / Hong Kong	2018	"Try Everything"	Live Performance	
Home Free	United States	2018	"Try Everything"	Music Video	
One Voice Children's Choir	United States	2021	"Try Everything"	Music Video	
Alejandra Guzmán	Mexico	2011	"Ciega, Sordomuda"	Latin Grammys Tribute	
Lauren Jauregui	United States	2018	"Ojos Así"	Concert	
Leo Jiménez	Spain	2016	"Ojos Así"	Album	
Amy Diamond	Sweden	2004	"Underneath Your Clothes"	Album	
Out of the Blue	England	2014	"Hips Don't Lie"	Medley	
Out of the Blue	England	2014	"Whenever Wherever"	Medley	
Out of the Blue	England	2014	"Waka Waka"	Medley	
Christian Ice	Italy	2007	"Whenever Wherever"	Music Video	
Hot Chip	England	2010	"She Wolf"	Music Sesion	
Daniela Andrade	Honduras / Canada	2015	"Hips Don't Lie"	Music Video	
Aleks Syntek	Mexico	2011	"Estoy Aquí"	Latin Grammys Tribute	
Victor Manuelle	Puerto Rico	2011	"Inevitable"	Latin Grammy Tribute	
Jorge Celedón	Colombia	2011	"Inevitable"	Latin Grammys Tribute	
Vesna Pisarović	Croatia	2001	"Ciega, Sordomuda"	Album	
Rouge	Brazil	2004	"Underneath Your Clothes"	—	
Jorge Drexler	Uruguay	2011	"Devoción"	Latin Grammys Tribute	
Pepe Aguilar	México / United States	2011	"Que Me Quedes Tú"	Latin Grammys Tribute	
Karol G	Colombia	2022	"Hips Don't Lie"	Coachella	
Dream Ami	Japan	2015	"Try Everything"	Music Video	
Kieran Goss	Ireland	2003	"Underneath Your Clothes"	Album	
Mundy	Ireland	2003	"Whenever, Wherever"	Album	
Arca	Venezuela	2015	"Hips Don't Lie"	Audio	
Cravity	South Korea	2022	"Waka Waka"	—	
Paty Cantu	Mexico	2013	"Inevitable"	Pocket Show	
Ventino	Colombia	2016	"Shakira Discography"	Medley	
Natalia Jiménez	Spain	2011	"Ciega, Sordomuda"	Latin Grammys Tribute	
U2	Ireland	2017	"Whenever Wherever"	The Joshua Tree Tour	
Christian Castro	Mexico	2002	"Moscas en la casa"	Latin Grammys Tribute	
Marilina bertoldi	Argentina	2022	"Inevitable"	Concert	
Anand Raj Anand	India	2012	"Ojos Así"	Soundtrack	
Franco De Vita	Venezuela	2011	"No"	Latin Grammys Tribute	
Estopa	Spain	2012	"Te aviso, te anuncio"	Latin Grammys Tribute	
Alba Reche	Spain	2022	"Inevitable"	Concert	
Lele Pons	Venezuela / United States	2022	"Can't Remember to Forget You"	—	
Carla Morrison	Mexico	2022	"Estoy Aquí"	Album	
Carla Morrison	Mexico	2023	"Inevitable"	Concert	
Ximena Sariñana	Mexico	2023	"Inevitable"	Concert	
GOYO	Colombia	2020	"Antología"	Album	
Purple Kiss	South Korea	2020	"Try Everything"	—	
Mon Laferte	Mexico / Chile	2022	"Inevitable"	Concert	
BFF Girls	Brazil	2018	"Estoy Aquí"	—	
Sofia Reyes	Mexico	2017	"Me Enamoré"	—	
Sofia Reyes	Mexico	2017	"La Tortura"	—	
Edén Muñoz	Mexico	2022	"Antología"	—	
Natanael Cano	Mexico	2022	"Antología"	—	
Elsa y Elmar	Colombia	2023	"Inevitable"	Concert	
Elsa y Elmar	Colombia	2023	"Antología"	Concert	
LP	United States	2023	"Whenever, Wherever"	Interview	
Abraham Mateo	Spain	2023	"Shakira: Bzrp Music Sessions, Vol. 53 "	Concert	
Jackson Wang	Hong Kong	2023	"Shakira: Bzrp Music Sessions, Vol. 53"	—	
Jo Mingyu	South Korea	2023	"Waka Waka (This time for Africa)"	Concert	
Judeline	Spain	2023	"La Tortura"	Single	
Kenia Os	Mexico	2023	"Antología"	Concert	
Paramore	United States	2023	"She Wolf"	Concert	
Liz	South Korea	2023	"Acrostico"	Concert	
Rozalén	Spain	2023	"Inevitable"	Single	
Gale	Puerto Rico	2024	"Inevitable"	Single	
Tharatorn Jantharaworakarn	Thailand	2024	"La La La"	Concert	
Nella	Venezuela	2024	"Te Espero Sentada"	Album	
Girls Aloud	England	2024	"Waka Waka (This time for Africa)"	Concert	
Abel Pintos	Argentina	2025	"No"	Single	
Camila Cabello	Mexico / Cuba	2025	"Si te vas"	TikTok Video	
Dua Lipa	England	2025	"Antología"	Concert	
Damiano David	Italia	2025	"La Tortura"	Concert	
Cazzu	Argentina	2025	"Hay Amores"	Concert	

== See also ==
- Shakira discography
- List of songs recorded by Shakira
