= Any Gabrielly =

Brazilian musician (born 2002)

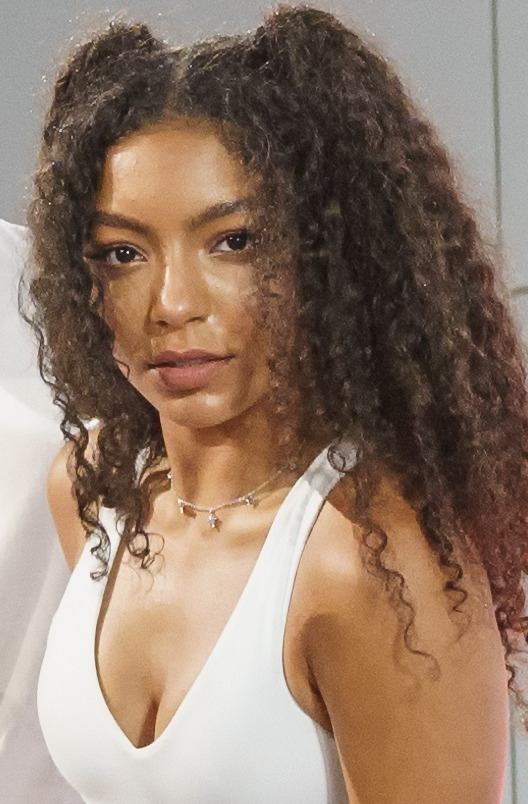
- Any Gabrielly in 2021
- Born: Any Gabrielly Rolim Soares; October 9, 2002 (age 24); Guarulhos, São Paulo, Brazil
- Occupations: Musician; dancer; actress; model; singer
- Years active: 2013–present
- Agent: Simon Fuller (2017–present)
- Notable work: Now United (2017–2022)
- Musical career
- Genres: Pop; Dance-pop; Musical; R&B
- Instruments: Vocals; piano; guitar
- Years active: 2016–present
- Labels: Republic; Universal; AWAL; XIX Entertainment
- Formerly of: Now United
- Website: anygabriellyofficial.com

Signature
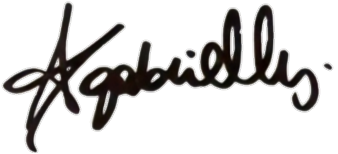

Any Gabrielly Rolim Soares (Brazilian Portuguese: [ˈɐni ɡabɾiˈɛli]; born October 9, 2002) is a Brazilian musician, dancer and actress. Born in Guarulhos, São Paulo, she began dancing at a young age and performed at some of the city's theaters while attending the São Paulo Municipal Ballet School. In 2013, she made her debut playing young Nala in the musical The Lion King. Her big break came in 2016 when she was chosen as the voice of Disney Princess Moana Waialiki on the Brazilian version of the animated film Moana. In addition to her voice acting work, Any Gabrielly also recorded a few songs for the film's soundtrack, including "Saber Quem Sou," the Portuguese version of the track "How Far I'll Go." Over the next few years, she represented Brazil in the global pop group Now United. The group's hits include the singles "Summer in the City" (2017) and "Paraná" (2019), as well as the musical Love, Love, Love (2021). In 2022 she left the group to focus on her solo career, managed by Simon Fuller.

== Career ==
Gabrielly's singing talent was first noticed by her family at the age of six, especially by her aunt Laura Carolinah.

At the age of eight, Gabrielly attended the São Paulo Municipal Ballet School, performing at the Grande Otelo, Cacilda Becker and Teatro Municipal theaters.

=== 2013–2015: Debut in Broadway musical and first works on TV ===
At the age of nine, Gabrielly was chosen to be one of the young Nalas in the São Paulo staging of The Lion King. The production had a long audition process divided into five stages, added to a 15-day workshop, from which Any came out approved and willing to live a new routine, which would involve three months of rehearsals from Monday to Saturday and, after the debut, a season of presentations twice a week.

In 2015, Gabrielly recorded the series Boo! A Call for Adventure, playing the nerd Chica.

=== 2016–2022: Moana, Now United and MPN ===
After auditioning in July 2016, Gabrielly debuted as a voice actress in the Brazilian version of the animation Moana, dubbing the title character and the first Polynesian Disney Princess, Moana Waialiki. The film had Any recording some songs, including the local version of "How Far I'll Go", "Saber Quem Sou". She followed it by dubbing Jade Alleyne's character Kaylee in the Brazilian version of The Lodge.

On November 14, 2017, Gabrielly's name was revealed as one of the members of the global pop group Now United, being the sixth until then. In December of the same year, the group Now United released their first single, "Summer in the City". In June 2019, the music video for "Paraná" was released by Now United, where Any stands out. And in September of the same year the song "Legends" was released on digital platforms, where Any is also the most prominent, the song has a Portuguese version called "Lendas", released in November 2019 on the eve of Now United's Dreams Come True Tour.

On August 19, 2020, Gabrielly was introduced as one of the hosts of 2020 Nickelodeon Meus Prêmios Nick, being the first black host in the history of Meus Prêmios Nick.

On September 22, 2022, Gabrielly announced in an interview with Rolling Stone, her departure from the musical group Now United to pursue a solo career.

=== 2023–present: Solo career ===
On April 4, 2023, Any Gabrielly signed a recording contract with Republic Records for the release of her work as a solo artist.

On August 12, 2024, Any Gabrielly announced her debut solo single titled "Sweat", which was released on August 23. On October 25, Any Gabrielly released "Waste Your Love".

== Filmography ==
=== Films ===
Original Voice
Year	Title	Character	Ref.
2018	The Red Scroll	Idril	
2026	As Dez Vantagens de Morrer Depois de Você	Gabriela Muniz	

Dubbing
Year	Title	Character	Notes	Reference
2017	Moana: Um Mar de Aventuras	Moana	Main Character	
2017	A Bela e a Fera	—N/a	Additional Voices / Choir	
2017	The Lodge: Música e Segredos	Kaylee	Main Cast	
2018	Coco	—N/a	Choir	
2019	WiFi Ralph	Moana	Cameo	
2019	Aladdin	—N/a	Choir	
2019	O Rei Leão	—N/a	Choir	
2021	Sing 2	Nooshy	Secondary Character	
2023	As Tartarugas Ninja: Caos Mutante	April O'Neil	Main Character	
2023	Lego Disney Princess: The Castle Quest	Moana	Main Character	
2023	Once Upon a Studio	Moana	Main Character	
2024	Moana 2	Moana	Main Character	

=== Television ===
Year	Title	Character	Notes	Reference
2015	Buuu – Um Chamado para a Aventura	Chica	Main Cast	
2018	Dreams Come True: The Documentary	Herself	Documentary on the creation of the NU	
2020	Meus Prêmios Nick	Presenter	Ambassador of audiovisual categories	
2022	Poliana Moça	Herself	Special participation; chapter 73	
2026	Habeas Corpus	Marina / Larissa Linhares	Main Cast	
2027	Paraíso Perdido		Telenovela for Globoplay	

=== Internet ===
Year	Title	Character	Notes	Reference
2020 2023	Any Gabrielly Convida	Herself	Talk Show on YouTube	
2021	Love, Love, Love. A Musical	Any	Short film	
2021	Any Gabrielly Cozinha	Herself	Talk Show on YouTube	
2021	Especial de Natal	Herself	Talk Show on YouTube	

=== Theater ===
Year	Title	Character	Reference
2013	O Rei Leão: O Musical	Nala (Young)	
2014	Menino Maluquinho, o Musical	Shirley Valerias' Cover	
2017	Broadway in Concert		

== Discography ==
=== Singles ===
==== As lead artist ====
List of singles as lead artist, showing year released, with selected chart positions and album name
Title	Year	Peaks			Album
Title	Year	BRA	US Latin	USA	Album
"Sweat"	2024	8	—	—	TBA
"Waste Your Love"	2024	9	—	—	TBA
"—" denotes a recording that did not chart or was not released in that territory.

==== Promotional singles ====
List of promotional singles, showing year released and album name
Title	Year	Album
"Fazer História"	2016	Non-album promotional single
"Além" (Versão Créditos Finais) (featuring Te Vaka)	2024	Moana 2 (Trilha Sonora Original)

==== Guest appearances ====
List of other appearances, showing year released, other artist(s) credited and album name
Title	Year	Other artist(s)	Album
"Seu Lugar"	2016	Saulo Javan, Mariana Elisabetsky and Rejani Humphreys	Moana: Um Mar de Aventuras (Trilha Sonora Original em Português)
"Saber Quem Sou"	2016	—N/a	Moana: Um Mar de Aventuras (Trilha Sonora Original em Português)
"Saber Quem Sou, Segunda Parte (Bis)"	2016	—N/a	Moana: Um Mar de Aventuras (Trilha Sonora Original em Português)
"Canção Ancestral"	2016	Rejani Humphreys	Moana: Um Mar de Aventuras (Trilha Sonora Original em Português)
"Teu Nome eu Sei"	2016	Vai Mahina, Olivia Foa'i, Opetaia Foa'i and Matthew Ineleo	Moana: Um Mar de Aventuras (Trilha Sonora Original em Português)
"Voltar"	2024	Villagers of Motunui	Moana 2 (Trilha Sonora Original)
"Além"	2024	Rejani Humphreys	Moana 2 (Trilha Sonora Original)
"A Vida é Boa no Mar"	2024	Ítalo Luiz, Eri Correia e Walter Cruz	Moana 2 (Trilha Sonora Original)
"Além (Reprise)"	2024	—N/a	Moana 2 (Trilha Sonora Original)
"Pra Ir Além (Te Fenua te Malie)"	2024	Olivia Foa'i, Opetaia Foa'i e Te Vaka	Moana 2 (Trilha Sonora Original)

== Awards and nominations ==
Year	Award	Category	Nominee	Result	Ref.
2020	Prêmio Jovem Brasileiro	Best TikToker	Any Gabrielly	Nominated	
2020	Prêmio Jovem Brasileiro	Best Instagram	Any Gabrielly	Nominated	
2020	Prêmio Jovem Brasileiro	Digital Development	Any Gabrielly	Nominated	
2020	Prêmio Jovem Brasileiro	Best Dance Video	Any Gabrielly	Nominated	
2020	Prêmio Jovem Brasileiro	Young with More Style	Any Gabrielly	Nominated	
2020	Meus Prêmios Nick	Challenger of the Year	Any Gabrielly	Won	
2020	Meus Prêmios Nick	Instagram of the Year	Any Gabrielly	Nominated	
2020	Meus Prêmios Nick	Inspiration of the Year	Any Gabrielly	Nominated	
2020	Meus Prêmios Nick	Digital Content	#AnyGabriellyConvida	Nominated	
2020	Capricho Awards	Style Inspiration	Any Gabrielly	Nominated	
2020	Capricho Awards	BR Icon	Any Gabrielly	Nominated	
2020	Prêmio Contigo!	Musical Revelation	Any Gabrielly	Won	
2021	Meus Prêmios Nick	Genius Creator	Any Gabrielly	Nominated	
2022	MTV Miaw	From Brazil!	Any Gabrielly	Won	
2023	Kids' Choice Awards	Favorite Brazilian Artist	Any Gabrielly	Won	

=== With Now United ===
At 17 years old, Any Gabrielly was the first Brazilian in history to be identified at MTV's Video Music Awards. She competed for the Best Group award with Now United.
