= The Red Scroll =

2020 Brazilian animated adventure fantasy film

The Red Scroll (Portuguese: O Pergaminho Vermelho) is a 2020 Brazilian animated adventure fantasy film directed by Nelson Botter Jr. and written by the same with the help of Fernando Alonso, Keka Reis e Leo Lousada. It was produced by the animation studio Tortuga Studios and distributed by Vitrine Filmes. The film premiered in 2020 at the 44th São Paulo International Film Festival and the following year being added to the Disney+ catalog.

== Synopsis ==
Nina is an ordinary 13-year-old girl, full of personal conflicts. One day, after finding a mysterious red scroll, she is transported to the fantastical universe of Tellurian. In this mysterious world analogous to Earth, inhabited by several fantastic creatures, Nina has to overcome several challenges in search of a mysterious object to return home.

== Voice cast ==
- Marina Sirabello as Nina/The Queen
- Nelson Machado as Lorde Dark
- Any Gabrielly as Idril
- Viny Takahashi as Victor
- Marcello Palermo as Wupa
- Alex Morales as Sérgio
- Thayná Cavalcanti as Juliana
- Alex Minei as Kim
