= No Rancho Fundo =

- Genre: Telenovela
- Created by: Mário Teixeira
- Inspired by: A Capital Federal by Artur Azevedo
- Written by: Marcos Lazarini; Angélica Lopes; Dino Cantelli; Renata Sofia
- Directed by: Allan Fiterman
- Starring: Larissa Bocchino; Túlio Starling; Andréa Beltrão; Alexandre Nero; José Loreto; Luisa Arraes; Débora Bloch; Eduardo Moscovis
- Theme music composer: Ary Barroso; Lamartine Babo
- Opening theme: "No Rancho Fundo" by Elba Ramalho ft. Natascha Falcão
- Country of origin: Brazil
- Original language: Portuguese
- No. of seasons: 1
- No. of episodes: 171

Production
- Producer: Silvana Feu
- Production company: Estúdios Globo

Original release
- Network: TV Globo
- Release: 15 April – 1 November 2024

Related
- Mar do Sertão

No Rancho Fundo is a Brazilian telenovela created by Mário Teixeira. It aired on TV Globo from 15 April 2024 to 1 November 2024. The telenovela is loosely inspired by the play A Capital Federal, written by Artur Azevedo. It stars Larissa Bocchino, Túlio Starling, Andréa Beltrão, Alexandre Nero, José Loreto, Luisa Arraes, Débora Bloch and Eduardo Moscovis.

In spite of being seen as a direct continuation of Mar do Sertão, the telenovela is officially presented as a kind of epilogue to the aforementioned story, since the main plot takes place shortly after the death of the character Tertulinho (Renato Góes), in addition to the absence of the other main characters from Mar do Sertão. However, several characters were brought back by Teixeira.

== Plot ==
Quinota is a naive young woman from the backcountry, leading a simple life in the arid lands of the Cariri region, in the fictional inland district of Lasca Fogo, Paraíba. Her life changes when she meets Marcelo, a man from the fictional Lapão da Beirada, a larger and more developed city. While on a date, Quinota and Marcelo kiss, but a dilemma arises when Quinota's mother, the strict gold miner Zefa Leonel, witnesses the situation. In a conservative and traditional family where a young woman's honor is non-negotiable, Quinota's reputation is at stake without an official union.

However, Marcelo abandons Quinota and flees to the big city, refusing to marry. Determined to resolve the situation, Zefa sets out to find Marcelo with her daughter, but without success, as she ends up facing a very different scenario in Lapão da Beirada. Later, to the despair of Quinota and her husband Tico Leonel, without money to support the family, Zefa decides to take a risk by mining in the grotto on her family's land, known as the Blue Grotto, because it once contained the Paraíba tourmaline, which everyone believes to be extinct. Hope is renewed when Zefa finds the blue stone, completely transforming the lives of the Leonel family. The story unfolds with encounters and misunderstandings, scams, deceptions, revelations, and plot twists. Quinota, in Lapão da Beirada, finds a new love, Artur, without knowing that he is Marcelo's best friend.

=== Connection to Mar do Sertão ===
Years later, Deodora is released from prison after being convicted of killing her son Tertulinho and decides to change her life. To do so, she opens a cabaret called Voltagem and adopts a new surname: Montijo. However, she remains involved in some scams and relies on the help of Quintino Ariosto, her new suitor, to carry out her plans. The biggest obstacle in her path is Zefa Leonel, her enemy from the past, and when they meet again, they end up settling their scores, rekindling a strong rivalry. Furthermore, Sabá Bodó becomes mayor of Lapão da Beirada, but continues to get into trouble and is accompanied by Nivalda, Vespertino, Cira, Floro Borromeu, and his loyal sidekick Dona Escolástica . Bodó also sees an opportunity to get richer, especially when the Leonel family finds the blue tourmaline.

The center of the entire plot becomes the Grand Hotel São Petersburgo, a luxurious establishment in Lapão da Beirada, run by Quintilha, who left her famous inn to manage her new venture. She will remain informed about the latest events in the region, and it is there that Quinota, Zefa, Tico, and the entire Leonel family will live.

== Cast ==
=== Main ===
- Larissa Bocchino as Maria Quirina Belmont Leonel "Quinota"
- Túlio Starling as Artur Ariosto
- Andréa Beltrão as Josefa "Zefa" Belmont Leonel
- Alexandre Nero as Eurico "Tico" Leonel Limoeiro
- José Loreto as Marcelo Gouveia
- Luisa Arraes as Blandina Rivera
- Débora Bloch as Deodora Montijo / Deodora Limeira Aguiar
- Eduardo Moscovis as Quintino Ariosto Evaristo
- Alejandro Claveaux as Jordão Nicácio
- Mariana Lima as Salete Maria Pietrelcina da Consolação
- Clara Moneke as Caridade do Coração Eucarístico de Jesus
- Welder Rodrigues as Prefeito Sebastião Bodó Vindouro Menezes "Sabá Bodó"
- Titina Medeiros as Nivalda Menezes
- Thardelly Lima as Vespertino Limoeiro
- Igor Jansen as Aldenor Belmont Leonel
- Guthierry Sotero as Anastácio "Nastácio" Belmont Leonel
- Heloísa Honein as Maria Margarida "Margaridinha" Belmont Leonel
- Dandara Queiroz as Benvinda Belmont Leonel
- Igor Fortunato as José Albertino "Zé Beltino" Belmont Leonel
- Rhaisa Batista as Fé do Coração Eucarístico de Jesus
- Andréa Bak as Esperança do Coração Eucarístico de Jesus
- Haroldo Guimarães as Cícero Eucarístico de Jesus
- Nina Tomsic as Dracena Muribel de Blumenau
- Suzy Lopes as Cira Aparecida de Gênova
- Leandro Daniel as Floro Borromeu
- Ju Colombo as Quintilha das Chagas
- Tomás de França as José Carlos Belmont Leonel "Juquinha"
- Duda Rios as Tobias Aldonço
- Natascha Falcão as Lola
- Vitória Rodrigues as Blanchette
- Nanego Lira as Padre Zezo Gusmão / Monsenhor José de Botas
- Valdineia Soriano as Manuela Ariosto
- Zahy Tentehar as Doctor Paula Alexandre
- Alex Patrício as Celso Batistão
- Rafael Saraiva as Guilherme Tell
- Isis Broken as Corina Castello
- Fatima Patricio as Castorina Rivera
- Ana Maria Mangeth as Escolástica
- Jorge Ritchie as Torquato Tasso
- Renan Motta as Marconi
- Ivson Rainero as Sivuplê
- Esther Brollo as Rafaela
- Evaldo Macarrão as Antonio Bello
- Lukete as Palmito Repentista
- Juzé as Totonho Repentista

=== Guest stars ===
- Enrique Díaz as Francisco Itamar Miroel Timbó
- Letícia Salles as Zélia Noronha
- Maria Sílvia Radomille as Doctor Alba
- Carlos Betão as Gonçalves Dias
- Juliana Teixeira as Antônia Gonçalves Dias
- Tatá Werneck as herself
- Tati Machado as herself

== Ratings ==
Season	Episodes	First aired		Last aired		Avg. viewers (points)
Season	Episodes	Date	Viewers (points)	Date	Viewers (points)	Avg. viewers (points)
1	171	15 April 2024	20.1	1 November 2024	21.0	19.2
