= Mumuzinho =

Brazilian musician

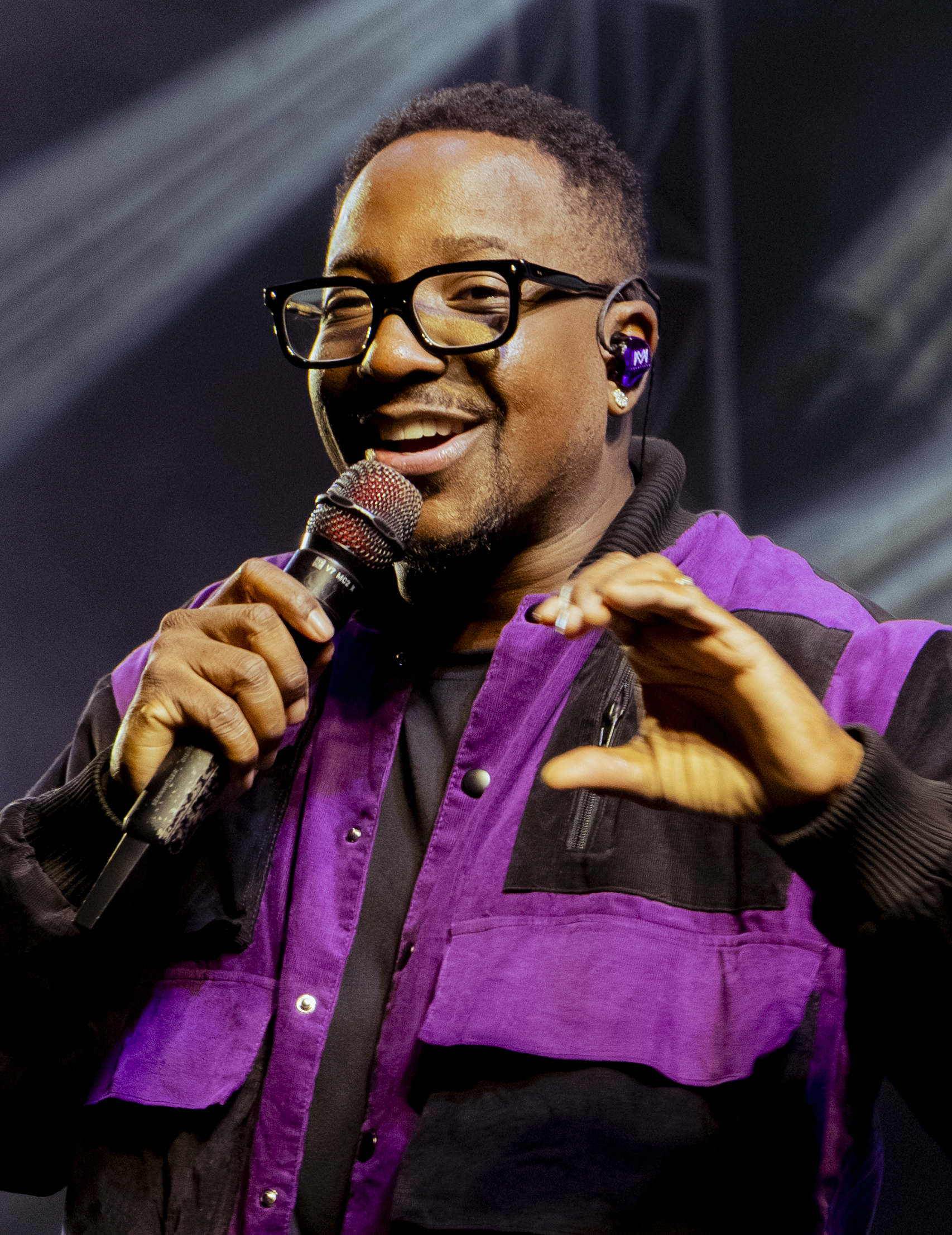
- Mumuzinho in 2025

Background information
- Born: Márcio da Costa Batista; 14 December 1983 (age 42); Realengo, Rio de Janeiro, Brazil
- Genres: Pagode; samba
- Occupation: Singer, composer
- Instrument: Vocals

Márcio da Costa Batista (born 14 December 1983), better known by his stage name Mumuzinho, is a Brazilian singer, composer, and actor. Mumuzinho gained national attention in the early 2000s following his roles in several films such as Xuxa Popstar, City of God, City of Men, Elite Squad. Since his acting roles, Mumuzinho has become popular in the Brazilian music scene, being signed to Universal Music Group. He sings in the pagode and samba genres.

== Early life ==
Mumuzinho was born Márcio da Costa Batista in Realengo, Rio de Janeiro on 14 December 1983. His stage name comes from a perceived resemblance of him in the comedian and musician Mussum, as well as being the younger brother of Marcelo Batista.

== Career ==
=== 2000–2010: Career beginnings and film roles ===
Through the early 2000s, Mumuzinho landed several acting roles in popular Brazilian films. Xuxa Popstar (2000), City of God (2002), City of Men (2007), Elite Squad (2007). From these productions, Mumuzinho gained notoriety as a musician. In 2007, he served as an opening act to shows of prominent musicians such as Belo and Exaltasamba. In 2008, he was a backing vocalist for Dudu Nobre and has since collaborated with him on numerous singles.

=== 2011–2019: Music career and record deal ===
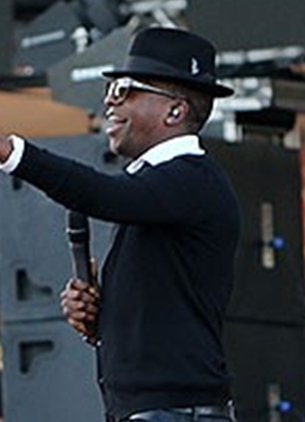
Mumuzinho performing in 2014

In 2011, Mumuzinho released the CD, Transpirando amor. It had the track "Curto-circuito", which achieved success throughout Brazil. At the invitation of Zeca Pagodinho, he participated in the recording of the DVD Quintal do Pagodinho, in which he interpreted the song "A voz do meu samba", his partnership with André Renato. The same year, he was hired by Rede Globo on the show Esquenta!, which was presented by Regina Casé. The show emphasized samba and pagode musical genres in the Rio de Janeiro area, bolstering Mumuzinho's reputation in the region.

In 2012, he started recording the miniseries Preamar on the HBO channel. That same year he released, through his Universal Music lavel, the CD Dom de Sonhar, produced by Bruno Cardoso, Sérgio Jr. and Lelê, members of the group Sorriso Maroto. The album includes some of the songs released on the CD Transpirando amor, such as "Curto-circuito" (Claudemir and Felipe Silva), "Te amo" (Carlos Caetano and Adriano Ribeiro), "Mande um sinal" (André Renato and Felipe Silva), "Se eu tinha o poder" (André Renato and Leandro Fabi) and "Calma" (Felipe Silva and Claudemir). In 2014, Mumuzinho returned to film in the production Made in China. In the following years, Mumuzinho released several singles while performing in Brazil.

In 2018, Mumuzinho released his album A Voz do Meu Samba (Ao Vivo), which includes six singles.

=== 2020–present: Further releases and various appearances on The Voice Brasil ===
In 2020, Mumuzinho released the singles "Mantra", "Guerra de Almofada", "Confiança", and "Playlist". From 2021 to 2024, he released five songs.

Since 2020, Mumuzinho has appeared on several Brazilian versions of The Voice. In 2020, he replaced Claudia Leitte on the fifth season of The Voice Kids. In 2021, he debuted as a coach on the first season of The Voice +. In 2023, Mumuzinho returned to The Voice Kids as a coach for the eighth season, winning the season with his artist Henrique Lima. In late 2023, he filled in for Iza during the blind auditions of the twelfth season of The Voice Brasil. In 2025, he debuted as a coach on the thirteenth season of The Voice Brasil. Mumuzinho was the winning coach again when his final artist, Thiago Garcia, won the season.

== Discography ==
=== Albums ===
==== Studio albums ====
- 2012: Dom de Sonhar
- 2015: Fala Meu Nome Aí

==== Live albums ====
- 2013: Mumuzinho Ao Vivo
- 2018: A Voz do Meu Samba

=== Singles ===
- 2012 : "Curto Circuito"
- 2013 : "Mande Um Sinal/Calma/ Dom De Sonhar" (Ao Vivo)
- 2015 : "Fulminante"
- 2018 : "Eu Mereço Ser Feliz Agora" (Ao Vivo)
- 2018 : "Curto Circuito/Fala/Te Amo" (Ao Vivo)
- 2018 : "Não Quero Despedida" (Ao Vivo)
- 2018 : "Fulminante" (Ao Vivo)
- 2018 : "A Loba" (Ao Vivo)
- 2018 : "Homen Perfeito"
- 2020 : "Mantra"
- 2020 : "Guerra de Almofada"
- 2020 : "Confiança"
- 2020 : "Playlist"
- 2021 : "Tomara"
- 2022 : "Sem Vestígios" (Ao Vivo No Rio de Janeiro/2022)
- 2024 : "Porradão / Deixa Alagar"
- 2024 : "A Três"
- 2025 : "Por Enquanto /Citação: Meu Bem Querer"
