= Tierry =

Brazilian singer

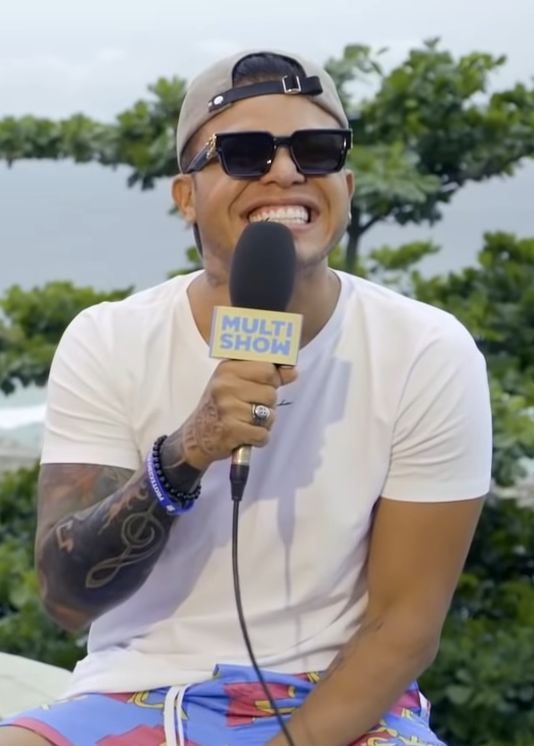

Background information
- Born: Salvador, Bahia, Brazil
- Genres: arrocha; Sertanejo
- Occupations: Singer; songwriter
- Years active: 2015–present

Tierre de Araújo Paixão da Costa, known only as Tierry, is a Brazilian singer and songwriter.

== Biography and career ==
Before his fame as a singer, he gained prominence as a composer, working in great successes of Brazilian music that became popular in the voices of singers such as Gusttavo Lima, Ivete Sangalo e Claudia Leitte. In 2015 he started his own solo singing career.

At the turn of 2019 year to 2020, Tierry achieved great success with the song "Cracudo", appearing on Spotify's Top 50 songs in Brazil. During 2020, Tierry achieved success with two other songs as a singer in the top 200 of Spotify Brasil, "Rita" and "HB20". The single "Rita" reached the position 8 in November 2020 and the position 10 in December 2020 in the Top 50 Streaming in Brazil.
