= BFF Girls =

Brazilian girl group

- Origin: Brazil
- Genres: Pop
- Instruments: Vocals; guitar; piano; sampler
- Years active: 2013–present
- Label: Sony Music Brasil
- Members: Bia Torres; Laura Castro; Giulia Nassa
- Website: www.bffgirls.com.br

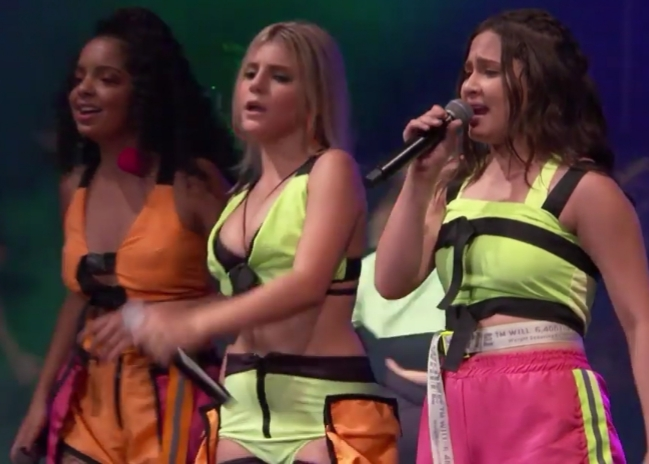
BFF Girls, 2019

BFF Girls is a Brazilian girl group formed in the first season of the reality show The Voice Kids. Currently, the group is formed by Bia Torres, Giulia Nassa and Laura Castro. The original line-up included Laura Schadeck, who officially announced her departure in January 2019. The group owns the number one hit "Fica" on Billboard Brasil. The group is hired by Sony Music.

== Biography and career ==
Formed by Bia Torres, Giulia Nassa and Laura Schadeck after meeting on the TV show The Voice Kids in 2016 and 2017, the BFF Girls began their journey by covering national and international songs. The trio's YouTube channel entered the Top 10 of the highest number of views on Vevo in 2018, giving visibility to the copyright works that would follow.

In March 2018, the group released a series of copyright songs always accompanied by clips, such as "BFF", "Eu Shippo" and "Meu Crush". Hit by Brazilian teen pop, “Meu Crush” also won a Spanish version, written by Erika Ender, [6] winner of the Latin Grammy and co-author of the mega hit "Despacito", produced by Umberto Tavares. In January 2019, Laura Schadeck announced her departure, and Laura Castro stepped in.

In 2019, the trio released their first authorial EP, entitled "Nossa Vibe". The 3 unpublished tracks ("Minha Vibe", "Flashback" and "Com Você") presented also won clips with different scenarios, but that are part of the same narrative. Stop ”in the soundtrack of the Angry Birds 2 film and participated in the Vevo Live Performance, presenting the acoustic version of the hit“ Meu Crush ”and then launching“ Eu Sou ”, and to close the year," Fica "was released.

== Discography ==
=== Extended plays (EPs) ===
Título	Detalhes
Nossa Vibe	Released: May 29, 2019; Format(s): Digital Download, streaming; Label: Sony Music

=== Singles ===
Year	Song	Best positions in the tables		Album
Year	Song	BRA	BRA Pop	Album
2018	"BFF"	—	—	Not added to any album
2018	"Meu Crush"	—	—	Not added to any album
2018	"Pode Parar"	—	—	Not added to any album
2018	"Eu Shippo"	—	—	Not added to any album
2019	"Flashback"	—	—	Nossa Vibe
2019	"Com Você"	—	—	Nossa Vibe
2019	"Minha Vibe"	—	—	Nossa Vibe
2019	"Eu Sou"	—	—	Not added to any album
2019	"Fica"	32	1	Not added to any album
2020	"Timidez (I Will Say Love You)"	—	—	Not added to any album
2020	"Promete"	—	—	Not added to any album
"—" denotes songs that did not enter the charts or were not released in Brazil.

== Filmography ==
=== Television and web series ===
- The Voice Kids Brazil
- Use sua Voz
- Malu Cast

== Awards and nominations ==
Year	Award	Category	Nomination	Result	Ref.
2018	Meus Prêmios Nick	YouTuber Musical Favorito	BFF Girls	Won	
2018	Meus Prêmios Nick	Revelação Musical	BFF Girls	Indicadas	
2019	Kids' Choice Awards	Influencer Musical Brasileiro Favorito	BFF Girls	Won	
2019	Prêmio F5	Melhor dupla ou banda musical	BFF Girls	Indicadas	
2019	Premio Jovem Brasileiro	Qual é o Rookie do Ano (Novo Artista ou Grupo)	BFF Girls	Indicadas	
2020	Meus Prêmios Nick	Hit Nacional Favorito	"Fica"	Indicadas	
2020	Meus Prêmios Nick	Conteúdo Digital do Ano	Websérie Por trás da Música	Indicadas	
2020	Meus Prêmios Nick	Vencedores Épicos do KCA	BFF Girls	Indicadas	
