= Natascha Falcão =

Natascha Falcão (born Recife, Pernambuco, Brazil) is a Brazilian actor, dancer, and singer.

Natascha specializes in regional music from Brazil's Northeast, including forró, samba, frevo, maracatu, and ciranda. Natascha was nominated for a Best New Artist Award at the 2023 Latin Grammys. Her album Universo de Paixão was nominated for Best Portuguese Language Roots Album at the 2025 Latin Grammy Awards. Natascha was a semi-finalist on The Voice Brazil in 2025.

As an actress, Natascha played Lola in the 2024 Globo telenovela No Rancho Fundo. She also contributed to the theme song. In 2023, she played the role of Carmen in the tenenovela Vai na Fé.

== Early life ==
Natascha received a scholarship to study English in London. She then returned to Recife to complete coursework in fashion and journalism.

Later Natascha moved from Recife to Rio de Janeiro in 2013 to pursue her formal dance education at the Escola Angel Vianna. While there, she joined the band Pirarucu Psicodélico.

== Discography ==
- Kitsch Completo (EP, 2019)
- Ave Mulher (2023)
- Universo de Paixão (EP, 2024)
- Universo de Paixão II (EP, 2025)
