= The Voice Kids (Brazilian TV series) season 8 =

The Voice Kids
- Season 8
- Hosted by: Fátima Bernardes
- Coaches: Carlinhos Brown; Iza; Mumuzinho
- No. of contestants: 54 artists
- Winner: Henrique Lima
- Winning coach: Mumuzinho
- Runners-up: Emanuel Motta; Isa Camargo
- No. of episodes: 14

Release
- Original network: TV Globo; Multishow
- Original release: April 9 – July 9, 2023

Season chronology
- ← Previous; Season 7

The eighth and final season of The Voice Kids premiered on TV Globo on April 9, 2023, in the 2:30 / 1:30 p.m. (BRT / AMT) daytime slot.

Fátima Bernardes replaced Márcio Garcia as the main host, thus becoming the show's first and only female host. Carlinhos Brown returned for his eighth and last season as coach and was joined by Iza and Mumuzinho, who replaced Maiara & Maraisa and Michel Teló, thus making it the first and only season to have all afro-Brazilian coaches.

On July 9, 2023, Henrique Lima from Team Mumuzinho won the competition with 45.11% of the final vote over Emanuel Motta (Team Brown) and Isa Camargo (Team Iza).

This was the final season of The Voice Kids before Globo announced that season 12 of the regular series would be the last.

== Teams ==
Key

Winner
Runner-up

Eliminated in the Live Finals
Eliminated in the Semifinals
Eliminated in the Super Battles

Eliminated in the Showdowns
Eliminated in the Battles

Coaches	Top 54 artists					
Carlinhos Brown						
Carlinhos Brown	Emanuel Motta	Laura Medeiros	Vitória Forrozeira	Cecília Nascimento	Alejandro Rodrigues	Wellinton Pedro
Carlinhos Brown	Dani Harumi	Emily Santos	Eros & Lorenzo	Gabriella Cavaco	Igor Mattos	Julia Rodrigues
Carlinhos Brown	Luana Sousa	Manu Luque	Marlysson Reis	Renan Santos	Rhyan Gabriel	Sofia Simplício
Iza						
Iza	Isa Camargo	Israelly Bonfim	Elloá Vanacci	Duda Mazolini	Giulia Amaral	Mirelly Raiane
Iza	Ana Julia Rodrigues	Anna Bheatriz	Bia Moura	Bernardo Caliman	Carol Harumi	Giovanna Ferreira
Iza	Júlia Cleff	Laura Lago	Luisa Pinheiro	Luísa Trinxet	Maria Alice Farias	Mika Donadoni
Mumuzinho						
Mumuzinho	Henrique Lima	TAY	Alicia Rachel	Lunna Beatriz	Ben Medeiros	Clara Castro
Mumuzinho	Ana Pérola	Giovanna Amolinário	Isa de Souza	Juan Peter	Larah Bia	Louise Dominato
Mumuzinho	Luiz Gustavo	Luiza Luz	Maria Antônia Corrêa	Maria Clara Davite	Mirella Campos	Theu Henrique

== Blind auditions ==
Key

✔	Coach pressed "I WANT YOU" button
	Artist defaulted to a coach's team
	Artist picked a coach's team
	Artist eliminated with no coach pressing their "I WANT YOU" button

Blind auditions results
Episode	Order	Artist	Age	Hometown	Song	Coach's and contestant's choices		
Episode	Order	Artist	Age	Hometown	Song	Brown	Iza	Mumu
Episode 1 (April 9, 2023)	1	Laura Medeiros	9	Brasília	"Carcará"	✔	✔	✔
Episode 1 (April 9, 2023)	2	TAY	14	Novo Hamburgo	"Still Loving You"	✔	✔	✔
Episode 1 (April 9, 2023)	3	Bernardo Caliman	9	Aracruz	"Sinônimos"	–	✔	–
Episode 1 (April 9, 2023)	4	Larah Bia	12	Belo Horizonte	"Something's Got a Hold on Me"	✔	✔	✔
Episode 1 (April 9, 2023)	5	Cecília Nascimento	9	São José	"Saber Quem Sou (How Far I'll Go)"	✔	–	✔
Episode 1 (April 9, 2023)	6	Emanuel Motta	13	Ourinhos	"Highway To Hell"	✔	✔	✔
Episode 1 (April 9, 2023)	7	Luísa Trinxet	10	Rio Bonito	"All I Want"	✔	✔	✔
Episode 1 (April 9, 2023)	8	Murilo Araújo	12	Jacareí	"O Vento"	–	–	–
Episode 1 (April 9, 2023)	9	Alicia Rachel	14	Rio de Janeiro	"Ben"	✔	✔	✔
Episode 2 (April 16, 2023)	1	Júlia Cleff	14	Florianópolis	"No Time to Die"	✔	✔	✔
Episode 2 (April 16, 2023)	2	Lunna Beatriz	9	Rio de Janeiro	"Vou Festejar"	✔	✔	✔
Episode 2 (April 16, 2023)	3	Bia Moura	11	Aracaju	"Rise Up"	–	✔	–
Episode 2 (April 16, 2023)	4	Henrique Lima	13	Senhor do Bonfim	"Mentes Tão Bem (Mientes tan Bien)"	–	–	✔
Episode 2 (April 16, 2023)	5	Emily Santos	13	Cândido Sales	"Sinto Sua Falta"	✔	✔	✔
Episode 2 (April 16, 2023)	6	Wellinton Pedro	14	Mafra	"A Mulher Maravilha"	✔	✔	✔
Episode 2 (April 16, 2023)	7	Luisa Pinheiro	10	Jacareí	"Don't Stop Believin'"	–	✔	✔
Episode 2 (April 16, 2023)	8	Arthur Brussolo	13	Jales	"Coração Bandido"	–	–	–
Episode 2 (April 16, 2023)	9	Luiza Luz	13	São Lourenço	"Eu Hein, Rosa!"	✔	✔	✔
Episode 2 (April 16, 2023)	10	Dani Harumi	10	Brasília	"O Caderno"	✔	✔	✔
Episode 3 (April 23, 2023)	1	Eros & Lorenzo	12–10	Campo Grande	"Vivendo Aqui No Mato"	✔	✔	✔
Episode 3 (April 23, 2023)	2	Maria Alice Farias	10	Belém	"Imagem (Reflection)"	–	✔	–
Episode 3 (April 23, 2023)	3	Sofia Simplício	11	São José do Sabugi	"Feira de Mangaio"	✔	–	✔
Episode 3 (April 23, 2023)	4	Ana Pérola	10	Açailândia	"Hackearam-me"	–	–	✔
Episode 3 (April 23, 2023)	5	Mika Donadoni	13	Indaiatuba	"Girls Just Want To Have Fun"	✔	✔	✔
Episode 3 (April 23, 2023)	6	Theu Henrique	10	Chapecó	"Vestido de Seda"	–	–	✔
Episode 3 (April 23, 2023)	7	Carol Harumi	9	Tupã	"Shallow"	✔	✔	✔
Episode 3 (April 23, 2023)	8	Sanah	14	Rio do Sul	"Sorte Que Cê Beija Bem"	–	–	–
Episode 3 (April 23, 2023)	9	Giovanna Amolinário	12	Rio Bonito	"Waka Waka (This Time for Africa)"	✔	✔	✔
Episode 3 (April 23, 2023)	10	Luana Sousa	12	Campo Maior	"Panis angelicus"	✔	✔	–
Episode 4 (April 30, 2023)	1	Clara Castro	14	Salvador	"Melhor Sozinha"	✔	–	✔
Episode 4 (April 30, 2023)	2	Manu Luque	10	Mogi das Cruzes	"Girl on Fire"	✔	✔	✔
Episode 4 (April 30, 2023)	3	Laura Lago	14	Canoas	"Love in the Dark"	–	✔	–
Episode 4 (April 30, 2023)	4	Renan Santos	10	Goiânia	"Cowboy Fora da Lei"	✔	✔	✔
Episode 4 (April 30, 2023)	5	Louise Dominato	11	São João da Boa Vista	"A Thousand Miles"	–	–	✔
Episode 4 (April 30, 2023)	6	Arthur Vaz	13	São Paulo	"Telefone Mudo"	–	–	–
Episode 4 (April 30, 2023)	7	Israelly Bonfim	11	São João de Meriti	"Me Refez"	✔	✔	✔
Episode 4 (April 30, 2023)	8	Juan Peter	11	Fortaleza	"Heal the World"	–	–	✔
Episode 4 (April 30, 2023)	9	Anna Bheatriz	13	Uauá	"Estranho"	–	✔	–
Episode 4 (April 30, 2023)	10	Julia Rodrigues	12	Osasco	"Como Nossos Pais"	✔	✔	✔
Episode 5 (May 7, 2023)	1	Isa de Souza	13	Viamão	"See You Again"	✔	✔	✔
Episode 5 (May 7, 2023)	2	Igor Mattos	11	Campo Grande	"Boiada"	✔	–	–
Episode 5 (May 7, 2023)	3	Isa Camargo	9	São Francisco do Sul	"Um Degrau na Escada"	–	✔	–
Episode 5 (May 7, 2023)	4	Edu Gaiteiro	11	São João do Oeste	"Os Corações Não São Iguais"	–	–	–
Episode 5 (May 7, 2023)	5	Mirelly Raiane	13	Recife	"Stay"	–	✔	✔
Episode 5 (May 7, 2023)	6	Alejandro Rodrigues	10	Brasília	"Andorinha Machucada"	✔	✔	✔
Episode 5 (May 7, 2023)	7	Maria Antônia Corrêa	13	Porto Alegre	"If I Ain't Got You"	✔	✔	✔
Episode 5 (May 7, 2023)	8	Ana Julia Rodrigues	11	Porto dos Gaúchos	"Meu Violão e o Nosso Cachorro"	–	✔	–
Episode 5 (May 7, 2023)	9	Maria Clara Davite	10	Belo Horizonte	"Sweet Child o' Mine"	–	–	✔
Episode 5 (May 7, 2023)	10	Marlysson Reis	9	Santa Cruz	"Café e Amor"	✔	✔	✔
Episode 6 (May 14, 2023)	1	Gabriella Cavaco	14	Salvador	"They Don't Know About Us"	✔	✔	✔
Episode 6 (May 14, 2023)	2	Giulia Amaral	11	Boa Vista	"Let's Twist Again"	–	✔	–
Episode 6 (May 14, 2023)	3	Giovanna Ferreira	9	Nova Friburgo	"Pra Ver Se Cola"	✔	✔	✔
Episode 6 (May 14, 2023)	4	Ben Medeiros	10	Curitiba	"Nuvem de Lágrimas"	✔	✔	✔
Episode 6 (May 14, 2023)	5	Duda Mazolini	13	Lindóia	"Chora Peito"	–	✔	–
Episode 6 (May 14, 2023)	6	Mirella Campos	11	Juazeiro	"Alvejante"	✔	–	✔
Episode 6 (May 14, 2023)	7	Geysian Kelly	12	Lagoa Seca	"Amor Abusivo"	–	–	–
Episode 6 (May 14, 2023)	8	Rhyan Gabriel	11	Siqueira Campos	"O Homem"	✔	✔	–
Episode 6 (May 14, 2023)	9	Elloá Vanacci	10	Campinas	"Stand by Me"	–	✔	✔
Episode 6 (May 14, 2023)	10	Luiz Gustavo	13	Teófilo Otoni	"Página de Amigos"	–	Team full	✔
Episode 6 (May 14, 2023)	11	Vitória Forrozeira	13	Boa Saúde	"De Volta Pro Aconchego"	✔	Team full	Team full

== The Battles ==
Artist won the Battle and advanced to the Showdowns
Artist lost the Battle and was eliminated

Battles results
Episode	Coach	Order	Winner	Song	Losers	
Episode 7 (May 21, 2023)	Brown	1	Vitória Forrozeira	"Asa Branca"	Luana Sousa	Sofia Simplício
Episode 7 (May 21, 2023)	Mumuzinho	2	Clara Castro	"Hey Jude"	Larah Bia	Louise Dominato
Episode 7 (May 21, 2023)	Iza	3	Isa Camargo	"Superfantástico"	Bernardo Caliman	Giovanna Ferreira
Episode 7 (May 21, 2023)	Iza	4	Mirelly Raiane	"My Universe"	Júlia Cleff	Laura Lago
Episode 7 (May 21, 2023)	Brown	5	Alejandro Rodrigues	"Meteoro"	Renan Santos	Rhyan Gabriel
Episode 7 (May 21, 2023)	Mumuzinho	6	Alicia Rachel	"Edelweiss"	Juan Peter	Maria Clara Davite
Episode 8 (May 28, 2023)	Brown	1	Laura Medeiros	"Várias Queixas"	Emily Santos	Julia Rodrigues
Episode 8 (May 28, 2023)	Iza	2	Duda Mazolini	"De Quem É A Culpa?"	Ana Julia Rodrigues	Anna Bheatriz
Episode 8 (May 28, 2023)	Mumuzinho	3	Lunna Beatriz	"Água de Beber"	Isa de Souza	Luiza Luz
Episode 8 (May 28, 2023)	Brown	4	Emanuel Motta	"Enquanto Houver Sol"	Gabriella Cavaco	Igor Mattos
Episode 8 (May 28, 2023)	Mumuzinho	5	Ben Medeiros	"Alô"	Luiz Gustavo	Theu Henrique
Episode 8 (May 28, 2023)	Iza	6	Giulia Amaral	"Circles"	Bia Moura	Mika Donadoni
Episode 9 (June 4, 2023)	Mumuzinho	1	Henrique Lima	"Na Hora da Raiva"	Ana Pérola	Mirella Campos
Episode 9 (June 4, 2023)	Iza	2	Israelly Bonfim	"Dance Monkey"	Luísa Trinxet	Maria Alice Farias
Episode 9 (June 4, 2023)	Brown	3	Cecília Nascimento	"Doce Mel (Bom Estar Com Você)"	Dani Harumi	Manu Luque
Episode 9 (June 4, 2023)	Mumuzinho	4	TAY	"Triste, Louca ou Má"	Giovanna Amolinário	Maria Antônia Corrêa
Episode 9 (June 4, 2023)	Iza	5	Elloá Vanacci	"Brisa"	Carol Harumi	Luisa Pinheiro
Episode 9 (June 4, 2023)	Brown	6	Wellinton Pedro	"Maria, Maria"	Eros & Lorenzo	Marlysson Reis

== Showdowns ==
Artist was chosen by their coach and advanced to the Super Battles
Artist was eliminated

Showdowns results
Episode	Coach	Order	Artist	Song	Result
Episode 10 (June 11, 2023)	Carlinhos Brown	1	Alejandro Rodrigues	"Quem Sou Eu Sem Ela"	Eliminated
Episode 10 (June 11, 2023)	Carlinhos Brown	2	Cecília Nascimento	"Era Uma Vez"	Coach's choice
Episode 10 (June 11, 2023)	Carlinhos Brown	3	Emanuel Motta	"Your Love"	Coach's choice
Episode 10 (June 11, 2023)	Iza	4	Duda Mazolini	"Malagueña Salerosa"	Coach's choice
Episode 10 (June 11, 2023)	Iza	5	Giulia Amaral	"Velha Roupa Colorida"	Eliminated
Episode 10 (June 11, 2023)	Iza	6	Isa Camargo	"Halo"	Coach's choice
Episode 10 (June 11, 2023)	Mumuzinho	7	Alicia Rachel	"Fim De Tarde"	Coach's choice
Episode 10 (June 11, 2023)	Mumuzinho	8	Clara Castro	"Se Eu Não Te Amasse Tanto Assim"	Eliminated
Episode 10 (June 11, 2023)	Mumuzinho	9	Lunna Beatriz	"Insensato Destino"	Coach's choice
Episode 11 (June 18, 2023)	Mumuzinho	1	Ben Medeiros	"Versos Simples"	Eliminated
Episode 11 (June 18, 2023)	Mumuzinho	2	Henrique Lima	"Bijouteria"	Coach's choice
Episode 11 (June 18, 2023)	Mumuzinho	3	TAY	"A Palo Seco"	Coach's choice
Episode 11 (June 18, 2023)	Carlinhos Brown	4	Laura Medeiros	"Doralice"	Coach's choice
Episode 11 (June 18, 2023)	Carlinhos Brown	5	Vitória Forrozeira	"Tropicana"	Coach's choice
Episode 11 (June 18, 2023)	Carlinhos Brown	6	Wellinton Pedro	"Não Aprendi Dizer Adeus"	Eliminated
Episode 11 (June 18, 2023)	Iza	7	Elloá Vanacci	"Flor e o Beija-Flor"	Coach's choice
Episode 11 (June 18, 2023)	Iza	8	Israelly Bonfim	"I Have Nothing"	Coach's choice
Episode 11 (June 18, 2023)	Iza	9	Mirelly Raiane	"(não) era amor"	Eliminated

== Super Battles ==
Key

Artist won the Super Battle and advanced to the Semifinals
Artist lost the Super Battle and performed again in Round 2
Artist was chosen by their coach and advanced to the Semifinals
Artist was eliminated

Super battles results
Episode	Coach	Order	Artist	Song	Result
Episode 12 (June 25, 2023)	Carlinhos Brown	1	Cecília Nascimento	"É Preciso Saber Viver"	Not Chosen
Episode 12 (June 25, 2023)	Carlinhos Brown	1	Emanuel Motta	"É Preciso Saber Viver"	Not Chosen
Episode 12 (June 25, 2023)	Carlinhos Brown	1	Laura Medeiros	"É Preciso Saber Viver"	Coach's choice
Episode 12 (June 25, 2023)	Carlinhos Brown	1	Vitória Forrozeira	"É Preciso Saber Viver"	Not Chosen
Episode 12 (June 25, 2023)	Iza	2	Duda Mazolini	"Ninguém Me Cala (Speechless)"	Not Chosen
Episode 12 (June 25, 2023)	Iza	2	Elloá Vanacci	"Ninguém Me Cala (Speechless)"	Coach's choice
Episode 12 (June 25, 2023)	Iza	2	Isa Camargo	"Ninguém Me Cala (Speechless)"	Not Chosen
Episode 12 (June 25, 2023)	Iza	2	Israelly Bonfim	"Ninguém Me Cala (Speechless)"	Not Chosen
Episode 12 (June 25, 2023)	Mumuzinho	3	Alicia Rachel	"Rosa de Hiroshima"	Coach's choice
Episode 12 (June 25, 2023)	Mumuzinho	3	Henrique Lima	"Rosa de Hiroshima"	Not Chosen
Episode 12 (June 25, 2023)	Mumuzinho	3	Lunna Beatriz	"Rosa de Hiroshima"	Not Chosen
Episode 12 (June 25, 2023)	Mumuzinho	3	TAY	"Rosa de Hiroshima"	Not Chosen
Episode 12 (June 25, 2023)	Carlinhos Brown	1	Cecília Nascimento	"Menina Solta"	Eliminated
Episode 12 (June 25, 2023)	Carlinhos Brown	2	Emanuel Motta	"Rock and Roll All Nite"	Coach's choice
Episode 12 (June 25, 2023)	Carlinhos Brown	3	Vitória Forrozeira	"Bate Coração"	Coach's choice
Episode 12 (June 25, 2023)	Iza	4	Duda Mazolini	"Na Sua Estante"	Eliminated
Episode 12 (June 25, 2023)	Iza	5	Isa Camargo	"Flowers"	Coach's choice
Episode 12 (June 25, 2023)	Iza	6	Israelly Bonfim	"Stand Up"	Coach's choice
Episode 12 (June 25, 2023)	Mumuzinho	7	Henrique Lima	"A Hora É Agora"	Coach's choice
Episode 12 (June 25, 2023)	Mumuzinho	8	Lunna Beatriz	"Opinião"	Eliminated
Episode 12 (June 25, 2023)	Mumuzinho	9	TAY	"Será"	Coach's choice

== Semifinals ==
Key

Artist was chosen by their coach and advanced to the Finals
Artist was eliminated

Semifinals results
Episode	Coach	Order	Artist	Song	Result
Episode 13 (July 2, 2023)	Mumuzinho	1	Alicia Rachel	"Pesadão"	Eliminated
Episode 13 (July 2, 2023)	Mumuzinho	2	Henrique Lima	"Você Mudou (Making Love Out Of Nothing At All)"	Coach's choice
Episode 13 (July 2, 2023)	Mumuzinho	3	TAY	"Sailing"	Coach's choice
Episode 13 (July 2, 2023)	Iza	4	Elloá Vanacci	"Sonho de Amor"	Eliminated
Episode 13 (July 2, 2023)	Iza	5	Isa Camargo	"Chandelier"	Coach's choice
Episode 13 (July 2, 2023)	Iza	6	Israelly Bonfim	"For Your Love"	Coach's choice
Episode 13 (July 2, 2023)	Carlinhos Brown	7	Emanuel Motta	"Locked Out of Heaven"	Coach's choice
Episode 13 (July 2, 2023)	Carlinhos Brown	8	Laura Medeiros	"Vou Deitar e Rolar (Qua Qua Ra Qua Qua)"	Coach's choice
Episode 13 (July 2, 2023)	Carlinhos Brown	9	Vitória Forrozeira	"Baião"	Eliminated

== Live Finals ==
Key

Artist was saved by public's vote and advanced to Round 2
Artist was eliminated

Live Finals results
Episode	Coach	Order	Artist	Song	Result
Episode 14 (July 9, 2023)	Iza	1	Isa Camargo	"Easy on Me"	Public's vote (71.84%)
Episode 14 (July 9, 2023)	Iza	2	Israelly Bonfim	"Pra Sempre Vou Te Amar (Forever by Your Side)"	Eliminated
Episode 14 (July 9, 2023)	Mumuzinho	3	Henrique Lima	"Na Hora de Amar"	Public's vote (66.00%)
Episode 14 (July 9, 2023)	Mumuzinho	4	TAY	"The Winner Takes It All"	Eliminated
Episode 14 (July 9, 2023)	Carlinhos Brown	5	Emanuel Motta	"Esse Tal de Roque Enrow"	Public's vote (68.63%)
Episode 14 (July 9, 2023)	Carlinhos Brown	6	Laura Medeiros	"Madalena"	Eliminated
Episode 14 (July 9, 2023)	Carlinhos Brown	1	Emanuel Motta	"You Shook Me All Night Long"	Runner-up
Episode 14 (July 9, 2023)	Mumuzinho	2	Henrique Lima	"Disparada"	Winner (45.11%)
Episode 14 (July 9, 2023)	Iza	3	Isa Camargo	"Fogão de Lenha"	Runner-up

== Elimination chart ==
Key

- Team Brown
- Team Iza
- Team Mumuzinho

Results

- Winner
- Runner-up
- Won Super Battle
- Lost Super Battle
- Immune
- Saved by public
- Saved by coach
- Eliminated

Final shows' results
Artist	Week 1		Week 2	Week 3	
Artist	Round 1	Round 2	Week 2	Round 1	Round 2
Henrique Lima	Not Chosen	Safe	Safe	Safe	Winner
Emanuel Motta	Not Chosen	Safe	Safe	Safe	Runner-up
Isa Camargo	Not Chosen	Safe	Safe	Safe	Runner-up
Israelly Bonfim	Not Chosen	Safe	Safe	Eliminated	Eliminated (week 3)
Laura Medeiros	Safe	Immune	Safe	Eliminated	Eliminated (week 3)
TAY	Not Chosen	Safe	Safe	Eliminated	Eliminated (week 3)
Alicia Rachel	Safe	Immune	Eliminated	Eliminated (week 2)	
Elloá Vanacci	Safe	Immune	Eliminated	Eliminated (week 2)	
Vitória Forrozeira	Not Chosen	Safe	Eliminated	Eliminated (week 2)	
Cecília Nascimento	Not Chosen	Eliminated	Eliminated (week 1)		
Duda Mazolini	Not Chosen	Eliminated	Eliminated (week 1)		
Lunna Beatriz	Not Chosen	Eliminated	Eliminated (week 1)		

== Ratings and reception ==
=== Brazilian ratings ===
All numbers are in points and provided by Kantar Ibope Media.

Episode	Title	Air date	Timeslot (BRT)	SP viewers (in points)	Source
1	The Blind Auditions 1	April 9, 2023	Sunday 2:30 p.m.	10.0	
2	The Blind Auditions 2	April 16, 2023	Sunday 2:30 p.m.	10.1	
3	The Blind Auditions 3	April 23, 2023	Sunday 2:30 p.m.	10.6	
4	The Blind Auditions 4	April 30, 2023	Sunday 2:30 p.m.	09.1	
5	The Blind Auditions 5	May 7, 2023	Sunday 2:30 p.m.	10.0	
6	The Blind Auditions 6	May 14, 2023	Sunday 2:30 p.m.	08.2	
7	The Battles 1	May 21, 2023	Sunday 2:30 p.m.	09.9	
8	The Battles 2	May 28, 2023	Sunday 2:30 p.m.	11.8	
9	The Battles 3	June 4, 2023	Sunday 2:30 p.m.	10.5	
10	Showdowns 1	June 11, 2023	Sunday 2:30 p.m.	10.5	
11	Showdowns 2	June 18, 2023	Sunday 2:30 p.m.	09.8	
12	Super Battles	June 25, 2023	Sunday 2:30 p.m.	10.9	
13	Semifinals	July 2, 2023	Sunday 2:30 p.m.	11.4	
14	Finals	July 9, 2023	Sunday 2:30 p.m.	11.0	

- In 2023, each point represents 268.083 households in 15 market cities in Brazil (76.953 households in São Paulo).
