= Melim =

Brazilian musical trio

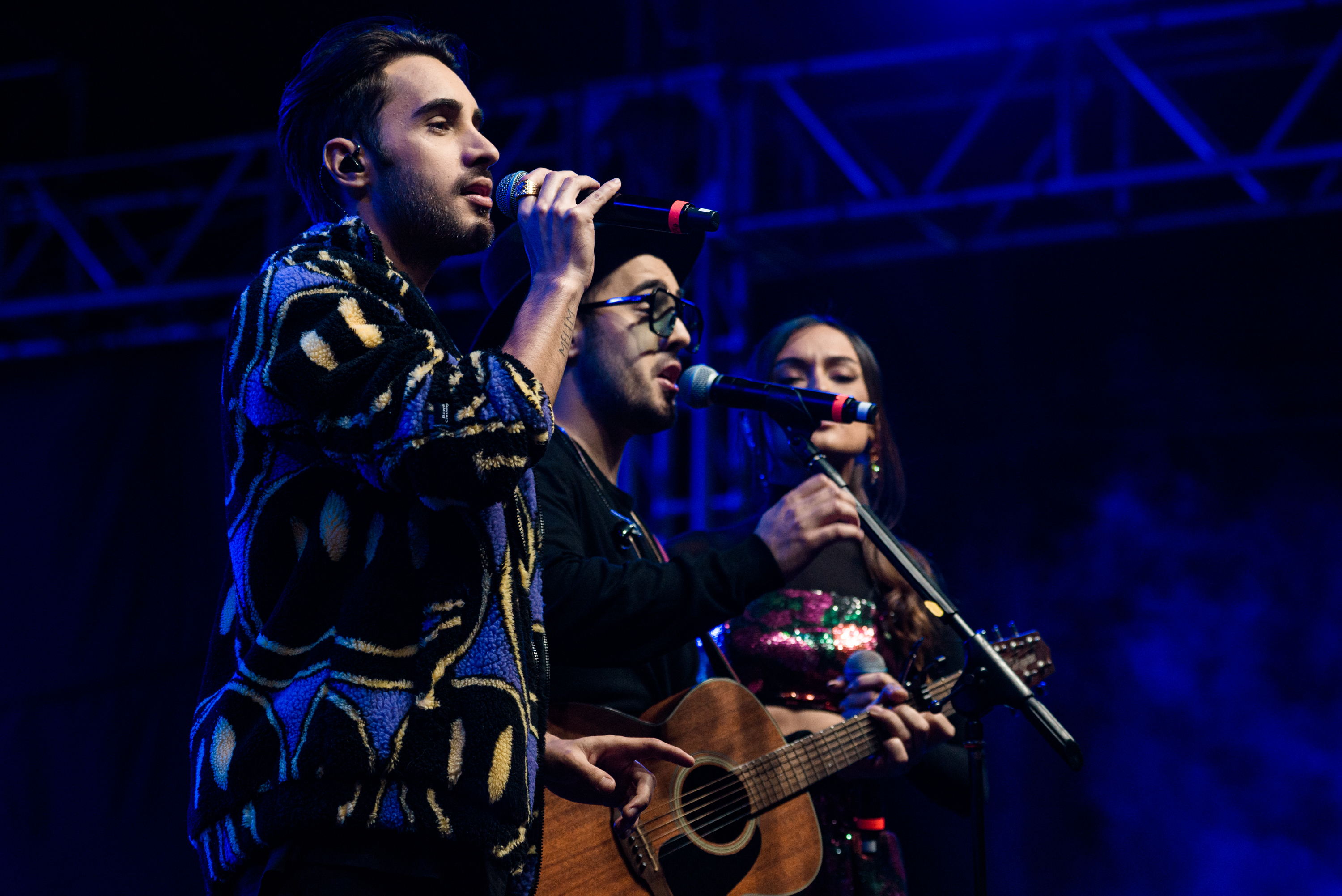
- Melim in 2022

Background information
- Origin: Niterói, Rio de Janeiro, Brazil
- Genres: MPB; reggae; Folk pop
- Years active: 2015–2023 (Note: Indefinite hiatus)
- Labels: Universal
- Members: Rodrigo Melim Gabriela Melim Diogo Melim
- Website: melimoficial.com.br

Melim is a Brazilian trio of siblings consisting of Rodrigo, Gabriela, and Diogo Melim. In 2016, they took part in the musical reality show Superstar on TV Globo, reaching the semi-finals, not advancing to the finals. In 2018, they signed a recording contract with Universal Music and released their first EP called Melim.

In 2021, their song "Amores e Flores" was nominated for the Latin Grammy Award for Best Portuguese Language Song.

== Discography ==
=== Studio albums ===
- Melim (2018)
- Deixa Vir do Coração (2021)
- Quintal (2023)

=== Extended plays ===
- Melim (2018)
- Eu Feat. Você (2020)
- Amores E Flores (2021)
