= Meus Prêmios Nick =

Annual Brazilian children's awards ceremony show

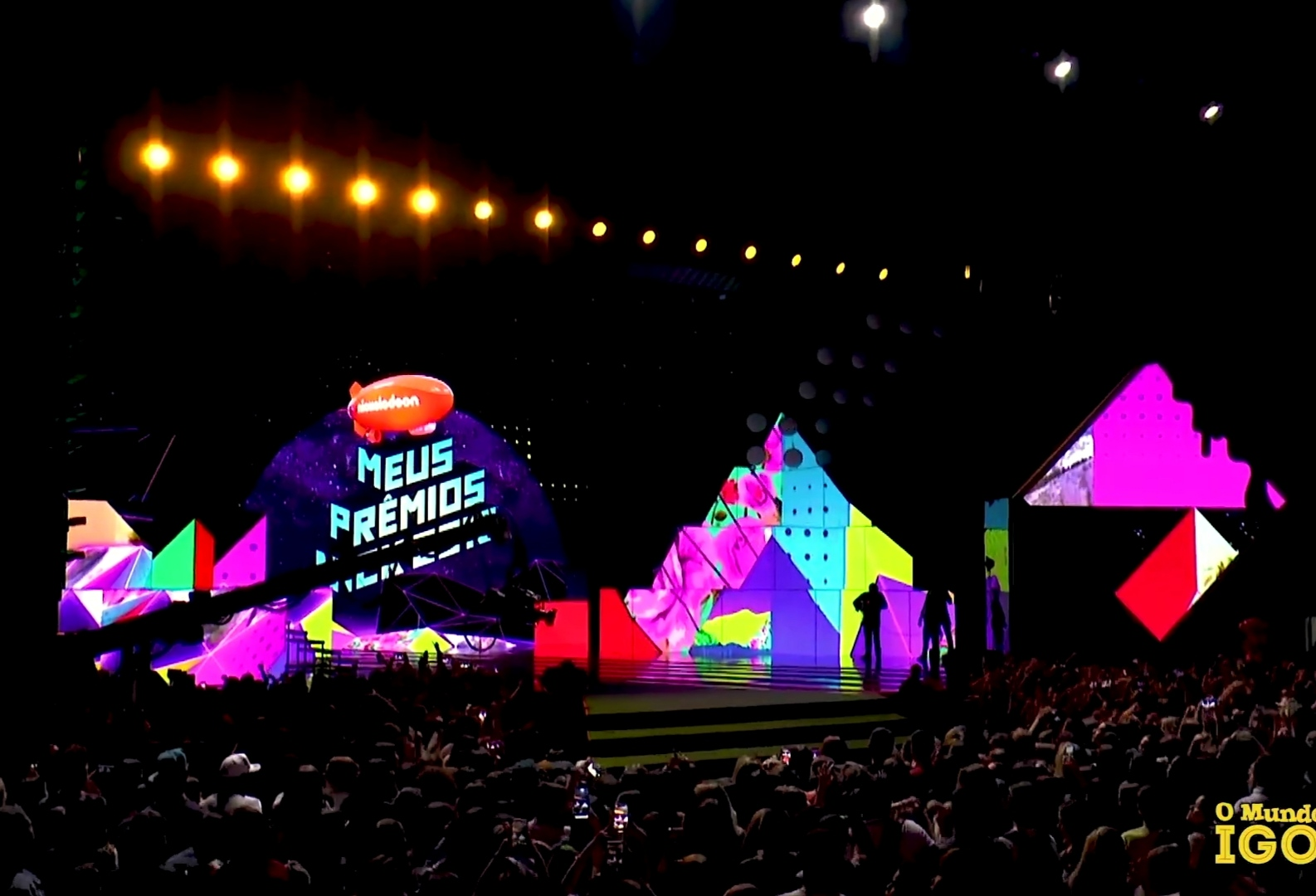
- Stage at 2019 Meus Prêmios Nick
- Awarded for: Brazilian Award
- Country: Brazil
- Presented by: Nickelodeon Brazil
- First award: 2000; 26 years ago
- Final award: September 28, 2021; 5 years ago
- Website: meuspremiosnick.com.br

Television/radio coverage
- Network: Nickelodeon Brazil

Meus Prêmios Nick (lit. My Nick Awards), often abbreviated as MPN, was the Brazilian version of the Nickelodeon Kids' Choice Awards (KCA). The event is one of the largest award shows for children's television in the country. The Brazilian version is one of the eleven countries in the world that holds a localised version of the Kids' Choice Awards. The first bout of the Meus Prêmios Nick was held in 2000, hosted by Márcio Garcia.

== Ceremonies ==
Years	Locations	Hosts
2001	Km de Vantagens Hall (then called ATL Hall)	Márcio Garcia
2002	Hopi Hari	Márcio Garcia
2003	Playcenter	Márcio Garcia
2004	Hopi Hari	Patrulha Nick
2005	Hopi Hari	Márcio Garcia
2006	Km de Vantagens Hall (then called Citibank Hall) and Tom Brasil	Patrulha Nick and Nick TôNicko
2007	Pepsi on Stage, Credicard Hall and Km de Vantagens Hall (then called Citibank Hall)	Fresno and NX Zero
2008	Pepsi on Stage, Credicard Hall and Km de Vantagens Hall (then called Citibank Hall)	NX Zero
2009	Km de Vantagens Hall (then called Citibank Hall) and Credicard Hall	Jullie, Marcelo Mancini and Lucas Silveira
2010	Km de Vantagens Hall (then called Citibank Hall) and Credicard Hall	Di Ferrero and Lucas Silveira
2011	Credicard Hall	Restart
2012	Credicard Hall	Rodrigo Faro
2013	Credicard Hall	Lucas Silveira
2014	Credicard Hall	Richard Rasmusen and Sabrina Sato
2015	Credicard Hall	Fábio Porchat
2016	Credicard Hall	Christian Figueiredo
2017	Credicard Hall	Larissa Manoela
2018	Credicard Hall	Maisa Silva
2019	Credicard Hall	João Guilherme
2020	Nickelodeon Brazil studio	Bruno Gagliasso
2021	Nickelodeon Brazil studio	Bianca Andrade and Fred

== Categories ==
=== Television ===
- Favourite Actress
- Favourite Actor
- Favourite Television Programme
- Favourite Drama
- Favourite Sitcom

=== Film ===
- Movie of the Year

=== Music ===
- Musician of the Year
- Musical Discovery
- Favourite Band
- Favourite Female Singer
- Favourite Male Singer
- Favourite National Hit
- Favourite International Hit
- Favourite International Artist

=== Sports ===
- Athlete of the Year
- Play of the Year

=== Beauty ===
- Cat of the Year (Female)
- Cat of the Year (Male)
- Trending Topics (TT)

=== Humour ===
- Favourite Comedian

=== Games ===
- Favourite Game

== See also ==
- Latin American television awards
- Nickelodeon Kids' Choice Awards
