= The Voice Brasil season 14 =

The Voice Brasil
- Season 14
- Promotional poster featuring coaches Matheus & Kauan, Prado, Ricardo, Nogueira, and host Leifert.
- Hosted by: Tiago Leifert; Gaby Cabrini (backstage)
- Coaches: Matheus & Kauan; Lauana Prado; Paulo Ricardo; Diogo Nogueira

Release
- Original network: SBT; Disney+
- Original release: 27 September 2026 – present

Season chronology
- ← Previous; Season 13

The fourteenth season of The Voice Brasil is the 2026 edition of the Brazilian musical talent show, premiering on September 27 at 6:00 PM on Sundays. For the second year, the program is broadcast on free-to-air television via SBT and on the streaming platform Disney+.

== Overview ==
Coaches and host

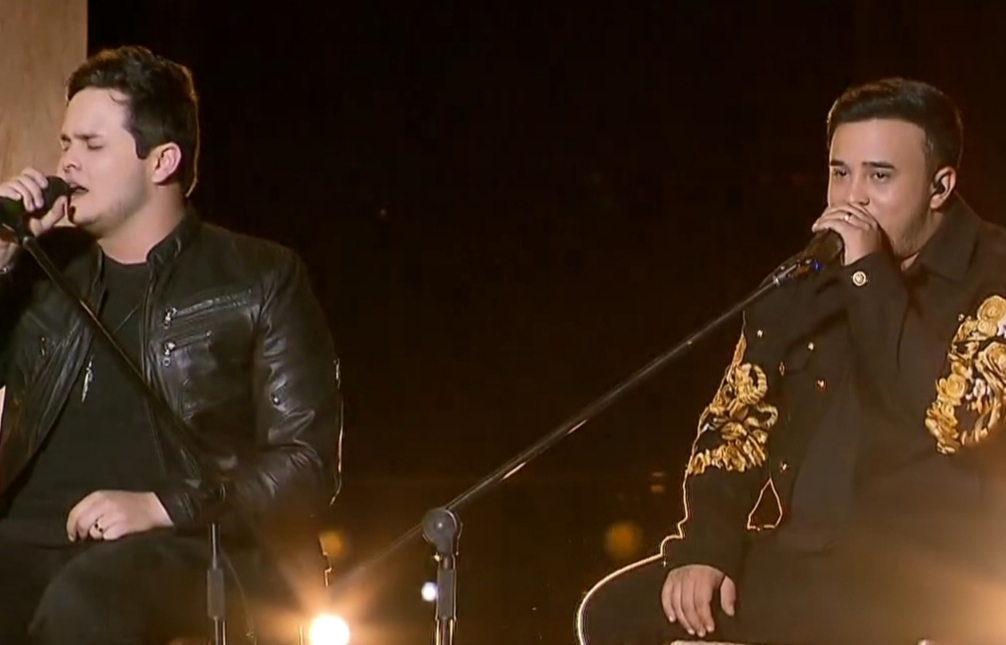
Matheus & Kauan

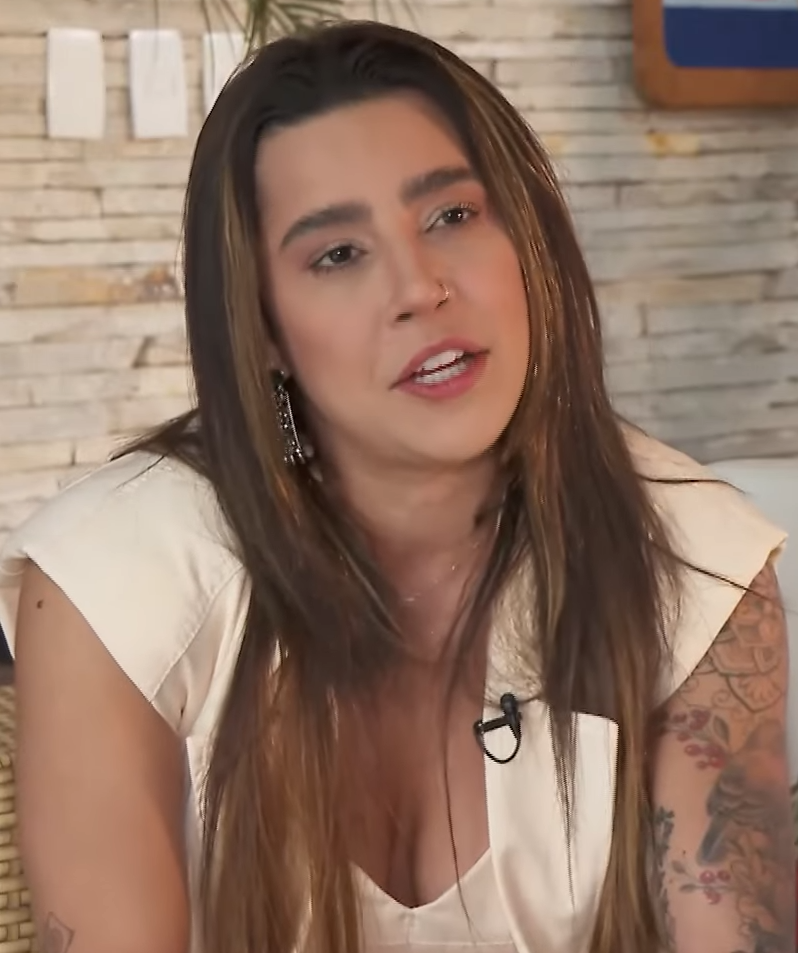
Lauana Prado

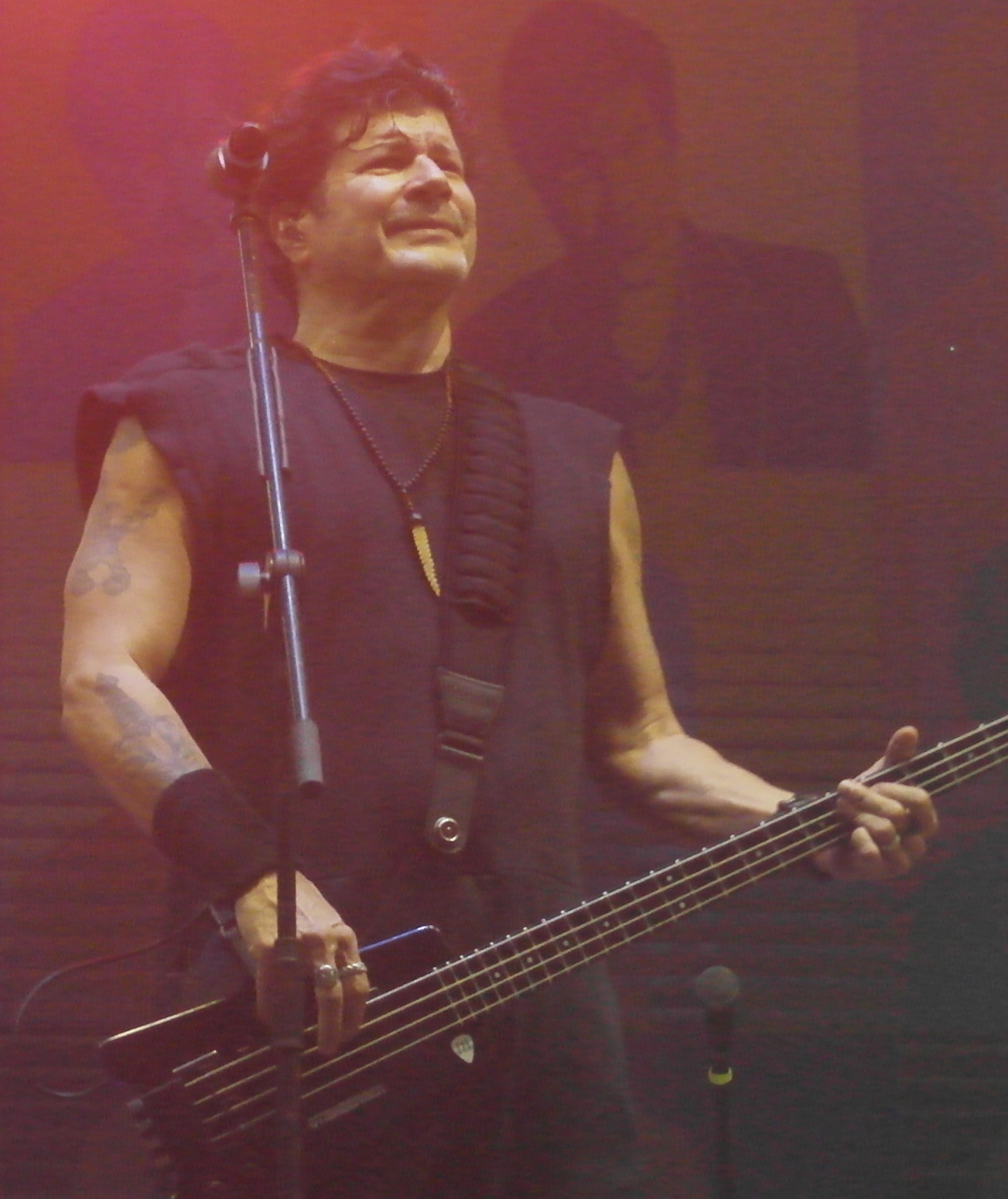
Paulo Ricardo

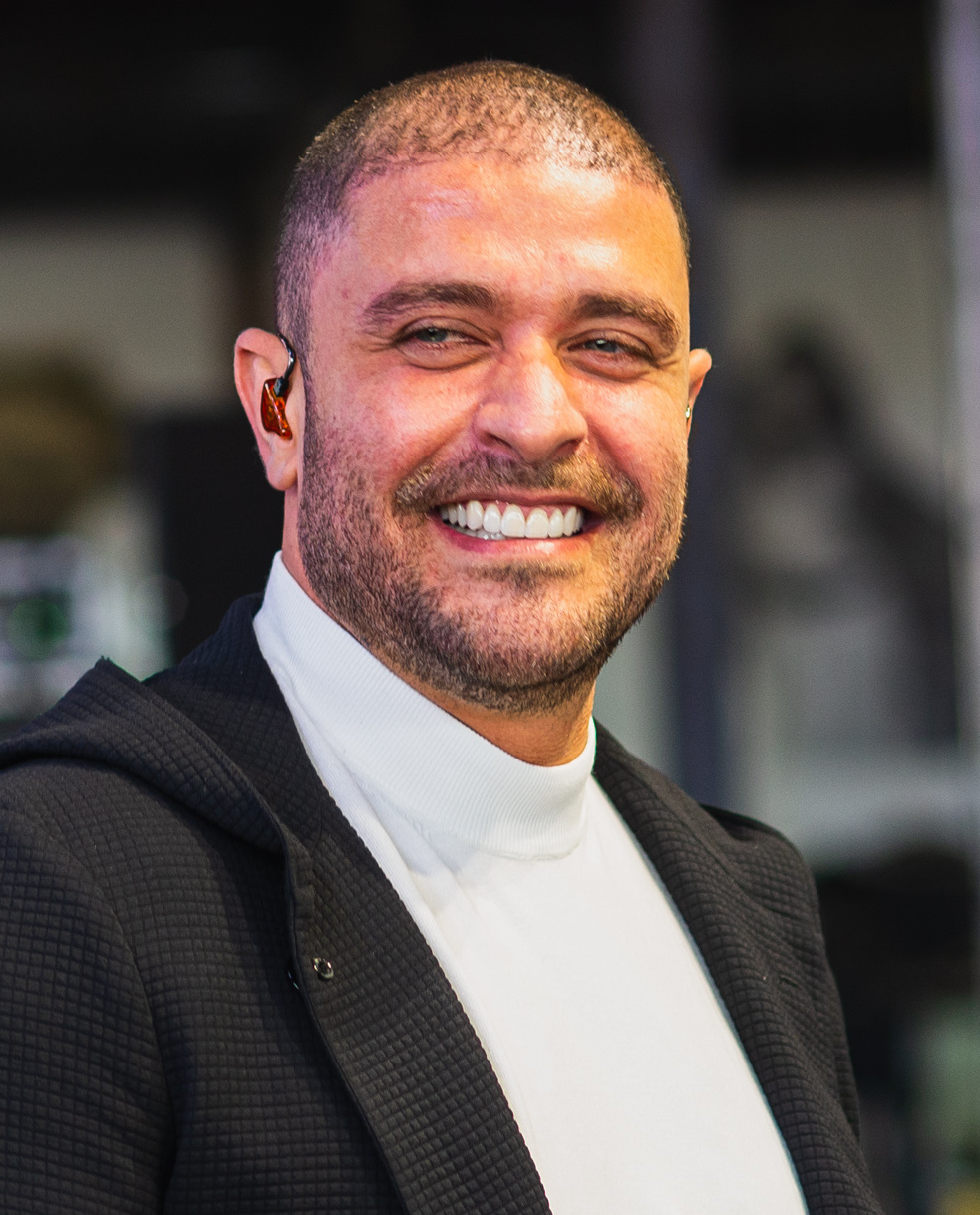
Diogo Nogueira

Priscilla (Guest coach)

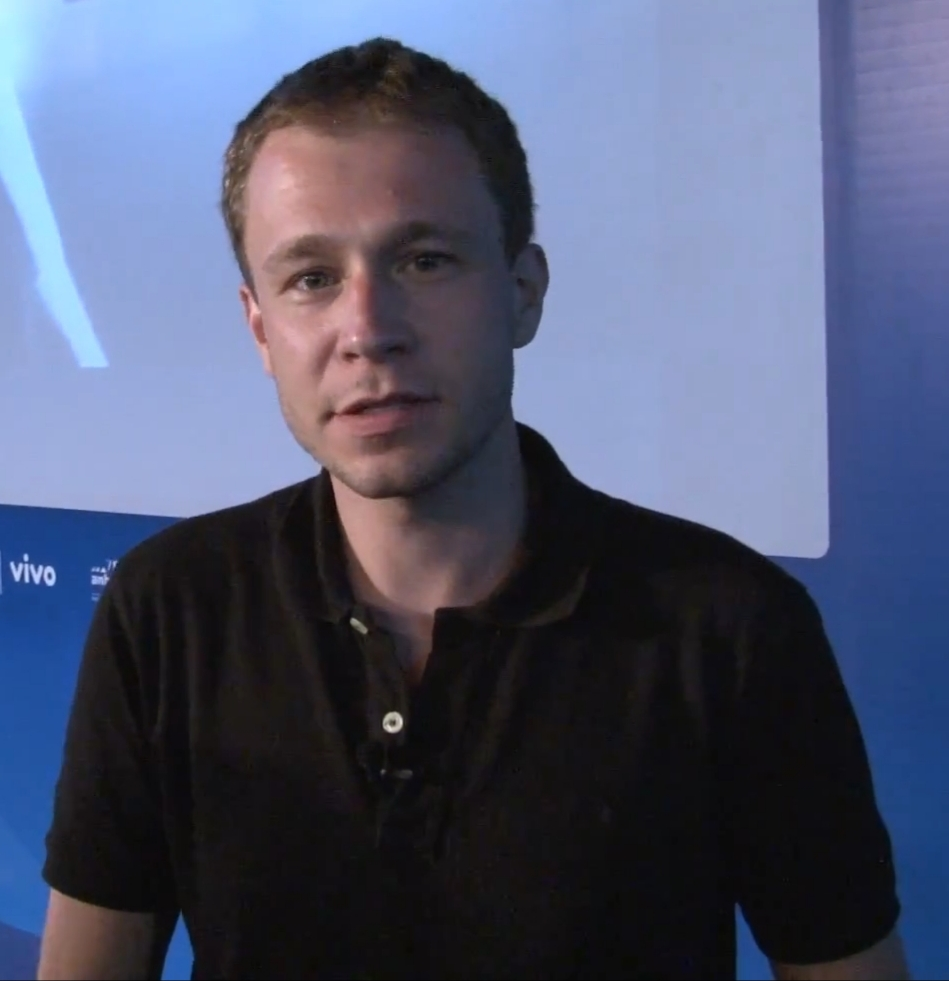
Tiago Leifert (host)

Tiago Leifert continues as the main host of the reality show, while Gaby Cabrini oversees backstage coverage and interviews with the contestants' families. The panel of coaches responsible for evaluating and training the participants features four prominent figures from the Brazilian music scene: the sertanejo duo Matheus & Kauan, returning to share a double chair; sertanejo singer Lauana Prado, a former contestant from the show's first season who becomes the first to return as a judge; and rock singer Paulo Ricardo and samba artist Diogo Nogueira, who also join the team as newcomers.

== Teams ==
Teams color key
Winner	Eliminated in the Live shows
Runner-up	Eliminated in the Showdowns
Third place	Stolen in the Battles
Fourth place	Eliminated in the Battles

Coaches' teams
Coach	Top 52 Artists				
Matheus & Kauan	Lia Lira	Maluê	Malu Casqueiro	Joe Trindade	Bia Vasconcellos
Matheus & Kauan	Jhonny	Tefi Sommer	Cristopher Clark	Ruby	~~Amá Reis~~
Matheus & Kauan	Kallen	Vini Costa	Raissa Barbosa	Gioli	
Lauana Prado	Bidesão	Junior Azevedo	Damatta	Elines Gomes	Karine
Lauana Prado	Mali	Juan Marcus & Vinícius	Rute Lífer	Anne Louise	~~Amadeu Brutus~~
Lauana Prado	~~Enická~~	Duda Torrez	Hudson Araújo	Vivi Alves	
Paulo Ricardo	Bella Kahun	Clara Carolina	Luna Voice	Camilla Marotti	Caroline Masioli
Paulo Ricardo	Mayra	Hugo Rafael	Judye Salles	Amadeu Brutus	~~Christopher Clark~~
Paulo Ricardo	~~Elines Gomes~~	~~Ruby~~	Anderson Mell	Rafa Queiroz	
Diogo Nogueira	Isaac Lima	Enická	Bell Spalla	Milena Amaral	Taigo
Diogo Nogueira	Mariana Lourenço	Amá Reis	Philippe Sapucaia	ElNatan	~~Bidesão~~
Diogo Nogueira	~~Carolina Masioli~~	Rafinha Bessa	Paulo Bentes	Everton Pretinho	
Note: Italicized names are artists stolen from another team during the battles (names struck through within former teams). Bold names are recipients of "Rescue" button

== Blind Auditions ==
In this stage, the coaches remained with their backs to the stage and selected participants based solely on their voices, without seeing who was performing. Each coach aimed to build their team throughout the auditions. When a coach liked a performance, they would press the red button, causing their chair to turn toward the stage. If two or more coaches turned for the same candidate, it was up to the participant to decide which team to join. The "Block" feature returned for the season. Each coach had a limit of two blocks to prevent another coach from vying for a specific candidate during the Blind Auditions. This season introduced a dynamic never before seen anywhere in the world: the "Diamond." In addition to the Blind Audition participants, each coach selected a former contestant from previous seasons of "The Voice Brasil" to join their team as a Diamond . The Diamonds played a dual role in the competition: while assisting their respective coaches in preparing and mentoring candidates throughout the season, they also returned to the contest as competitors themselves. Each Diamond represented exclusively the team of the coach who selected them and competed alongside the other participants, following their own unique path within the competition. Each coach could utilize the Diamond feature only once, selecting a single former contestant to fill this special role on their team.

Blind auditions color key
✔	Coach pressed "I WANT YOU" button
	Artist selected a coach's team
	Artist defaulted to a coach's team
	Artist was eliminated
	Artist was originally eliminated, but a coach pressed the "Rescue"
	Artist is an 'All Star' contestant
	Artist is an 'Diamond' contestant
✘	Coach pressed "I WANT YOU" button, but was blocked by another coach from getting the artist
	Blocked by Matheus & Kauan; Blocked by Lauana; Blocked by Paulo; Blocked by Diogo

- The coaches performed "Pro Dia Nascer Feliz" together at the start of the episode to kick off the season

Episode 1 (September 27,2026)	Order	Artist	Age	Hometown	Song	Coach's and artist's choices			
Episode 1 (September 27,2026)	Order	Artist	Age	Hometown	Song	Matheus & Kauan	Lauana	Paulo	Diogo
Episode 1 (September 27,2026)	1	Lia Lira	25	Freguesia do Ó	"Purple Rain"	✔	✔	✔	✔
Episode 1 (September 27,2026)	2	Bella Kahun	25	Garanhuns	"Mala e Cuia"	—	—	✔	—
Episode 1 (September 27,2026)	3	Bidesão	34	Curitiba	"Lose Control"	—	✔	✔	✔
Episode 1 (September 27,2026)	4	Jade Baraldo	27	Brusque	"Desapaixonar"	✔	✔	✔	✔
Episode 1 (September 27,2026)	5	Maluê	38/36	Senador Canedo	"Tubarões"	✔	—	—	✘
Episode 1 (September 27,2026)	6	Paulo Bentes	23	São Paulo	"Idiota"	—	—	✔	✔
Episode 1 (September 27,2026)	7	Laizz Ellie	33	Nova Iguaçu	"Mó Paz"	—	—	—	—
Episode 1 (September 27,2026)	8	Clara Carolina	41	São Gonçalo	"Miss Celie's Blues"	✔	✔	✔	✔
Episode 1 (September 27,2026)	9	Junior Azevedo	32	Salvador	"Eu, Você, o Mar e Ela"	✘	✔	✔	✔
Episode 2 (October 04, 2026)	1	Luna Voice	22	Ribeirão Preto	"Tua Voz"	✔	✔	✔	✔
Episode 2 (October 04, 2026)	2	Amá Reis	29	São Paulo	"Put Your Records On"	✔	✔	—	✔
Episode 2 (October 04, 2026)	3	Vivi Alves	39	Jacareí	"Saudade Burra"	—	✔	—	✔
Episode 2 (October 04, 2026)	4	Will	33	Goiânia	"Desafio"	✔	✔	✔	✔
Episode 2 (October 04, 2026)	5	Camilla Marotti	35	Petrópolis	"Skyfall"	✘	✔	✔	—
Episode 2 (October 04, 2026)	6	Hudson Araújo	33	Atalaia	"Displicente"	—	✔	—	—
Episode 2 (October 04, 2026)	7	Joe Trindade	24	João Pessoa	"Creep"	✔	✘	—	✔
Episode 2 (October 04, 2026)	8	Milena Amaral	26	Niterói	"Best Part"	—	—	✔	✔
Episode 2 (October 04, 2026)	9	Carlly	18	Ipatinga	"Melhor Sozinha"	—	—	—	—
Episode 2 (October 04, 2026)	10	Caroline Masioli	32	Rio de Janeiro	"Right to Be Wrong"	✔	—	✔	✔
Episode 3 (October 11,2026)	1	Mariana Lourenço	23	Americana	"Troca de Calçada"	✘	✔	✔	✔
Episode 3 (October 11,2026)	2	Amadeu Brutus	42	São Paulo	"Ordinary"	—	✔	—	✔
Episode 3 (October 11,2026)	3	Everton Pretinho	36	Almirante Tamandaré	"Falta Você"	—	—	—	✔
Episode 3 (October 11,2026)	4	Bia Vasconcellos	20	São Paulo	"Where Is My Husband!"	✔	✔	✔	✔
Episode 3 (October 11,2026)	5	Felipe & Benjamin	30/34	Nova Prata do Iguaçu	"Asas"	—	—	—	—
Episode 3 (October 11,2026)	6	Vini Costa	27	Maranguape	"A Noite"	✔	—	—	—
Episode 3 (October 11,2026)	7	Anderson Mell	33	Pirapetinga	"Hoje Eu Quero Sair Só"	—	—	✔	✔
Episode 3 (October 11,2026)	8	Mali	30	São José do Norte	"Olha Onde Eu Tô"	✔	✔	—	—
Episode 3 (October 11,2026)	9	Cristopher Clark	53	Santos	"Can't Stop Lovin' You"	—	—	✔	✔
Episode 3 (October 11,2026)	10	Tefi Sommer	23	Pipa Beach	"Sign of the Times"	✔	—	—	✔
Episode 4 (October 18,2026)	1	Philippe Sapucaia	36	Cururupu	"Razão Pra Sonhar (Jangadeiro)"	✔	✔	✔	✔
Episode 4 (October 18,2026)	2	Juan Marcus & Vinícius	33/31	Brasília	"Aí Já Era"	✔	✔	✔	✔
Episode 4 (October 18,2026)	3	Hugo Rafael	40	Sorocaba	"Fine China"	✔	✔	✔	✔
Episode 4 (October 18,2026)	4	Duda Torrez	23	Santos	"Iguaria"	✔	✔	—	✔
Episode 4 (October 18,2026)	5	Malu Casqueiro	18	Rio de Janeiro	"Material Lover"	✔	—	✔	—
Episode 4 (October 18,2026)	6	WD	33	Rio de Janeiro	"Eu Sou"	✔	✔	✔	✔
Episode 4 (October 18,2026)	7	Kallen	28	Caraguatatuba	"Blank Space"	✔	—	—	—
Episode 4 (October 18,2026)	8	ElNatan	30	Passos	"Me Bloqueia"	—	—	—	✔
Episode 4 (October 18,2026)	9	Zaki Santos	28	Cataguases	"Supera"	—	—	—	—
Episode 4 (October 18,2026)	10	Anne Louise	20	Boa Vista	"E.C.T"	—	✔	—	✘
Episode 4 (October 18,2026)	11	Isaac Lima	21	São Gonçalo	"A Lua e Eu"	✔	✔	—	✔
Episode 4 (October 18,2026)	12	Elines Gomes	31	São Paulo	"Heart Attack"	✘	—	✔	—
Episode 4 (October 18,2026)	13	Ruby	33	Florianópolis	"Side to Side"	✔	—	✔	✔
Episode 4 (October 18,2026)	14	Gioli	19	Rio de Janeiro	"Saudade da Gente"	✔	—	—	✔
Episode 5 (October 25,2026)	1	Karine	31	Campos dos Goytacazes	"Meu Talismã"	✔	✔	✘	✔
Episode 5 (October 25,2026)	2	Jhonny	33	Matão	"Apagar"	✔	✔	✔	✔
Episode 5 (October 25,2026)	3	OXA	36	Taquarituba	"Believe"	✔	✔	✔	✔
Episode 5 (October 25,2026)	4	Rute Lífer	31	Jaboatão dos Guararapes	"Dona de Mim"	✔	✔	—	✔
Episode 5 (October 25,2026)	5	Mayra	32	São Paulo	"Misery Business"	—	—	✔	—
Episode 5 (October 25,2026)	6	Taigo	23	São Gonçalo	"Paraquedas"	—	—	✔	✔
Episode 5 (October 25,2026)	7	Enická	24	São Paulo	"Unholy"	✔	✔	✔	✔
Episode 5 (October 25,2026)	8	Bel Spalla	33	Rio de Janeiro	"Se Eu Quiser Falar Com Deus"	—	—	✔	✔
Episode 5 (October 25,2026)	9	Judye Salles	28	São Paulo	"Radioactive"	—	—	✔	—
Episode 5 (October 25,2026)	10	Rafinha Bessa	32	Rio de Janeiro	"Um Dia, Um Adeus"	—	—	—	✔
Episode 5 (October 25,2026)	11	Maria Clara		João Pessoa	"Taste"	—	—	—	Team Full
Episode 5 (October 25,2026)	12	Damatta	28	Sátiro Dias	"Todo Homem"	✔	✔	—	Team Full
Episode 5 (October 25,2026)	13	Rafa Queiroz	31	Osasco	"Rock Your Body"	—	Team Full	✔	Team Full
Episode 5 (October 25,2026)	14	Raissa Barbosa	20	Ferraz de Vasconcelos	"Nome Proibido"	✔	Team Full	Team Full	Team Full

== Battles ==
At this stage, the program’s dynamic demands both the talent of the contestants and the strategic acumen of the coaches. The duels follow a structured set of rules. Each coach divides the members of their own team into pairs. These two contestants take the stage together to perform the same song as a duet, balancing vocal harmony with moments where each individual strives to stand out. Once the performance concludes, the other coaches offer their feedback, but the final decision rests solely with the coach of that team. They must select one winner to advance directly to the next stage of the competition, while the other is initially eliminated. Contestants who lose a duel have a chance to remain in the competition through the "Steal" feature. If rival coaches are interested in a contestant who was not chosen, they can press a button to "steal" that artist for their own team. Each coach is permitted to save up to two eliminated contestants throughout this entire phase. If more than one coach presses the button for the same artist, the power of choice shifts, and the contestant decides which team they will join. During the behind-the-scenes preparation process, the contestants are supported by "Diamonds"—individuals who serve as co-coaches or special mentors during rehearsals. They help the singers refine musical arrangements, distribute lyrical parts equitably, and manage pre-performance jitters before the live television broadcast.

Artist won the Battle and advanced to the Showndowns
Artist lost the Battle but was stolen by another coach and advanced to the Showndowns
Artist lost the Battle and was eliminated
Diamonds

- Ep.9: Lauana Prado perform "Whiskey Vagabundo"

Battles results
Episode 6 (November 01,2026)	Coach	Order	Diamonds	Winner	Song	Loser	Steal result			
Episode 6 (November 01,2026)	Coach	Order	Diamonds	Winner	Song	Loser	Matheus & Kauan	Lauana	Paulo	Diogo
Episode 6 (November 01,2026)	Matheus & Kauan	1	OXA	Lia Lira	"Lady Marmalade"	Bia Vasconcellos	N/A	—	—	—
Episode 6 (November 01,2026)	Lauana	2	—	Mali	"Coração Partido"	Vivi Alves	—	N/A	—	—
Episode 6 (November 01,2026)	Paulo	3	—	Camilla Marotti	"Chandelier"	Ruby	✔	—	N/A	—
Episode 6 (November 01,2026)	Diogo	4	Will	Philippe Sapucaia	"O Que é o Amor?"	Everton Pretinho	—	—	—	N/A
Episode 6 (November 01,2026)	Lauana	5	—	Juan Marcus & Vinícius	"Vem me Buscar"	Hudson Araújo	—	N/A	—	—
Episode 6 (November 01,2026)	Paulo	6	—	Mayra	"Stayin' Alive"	Elines Gomes	—	✔	N/A	—
Episode 6 (November 01,2026)	Diogo	7	—	Taigo	"Coisa Linda"	Caroline Masioli	—	—	✔	N/A
Episode 6 (November 01,2026)	Matheus & Kauan	8	—	Joe Trindade	"Veludo Marrom"	Amá Reis	N/A	—	—	✔
Episode 7 (November 08,2026)	Paulo	1	WD	Hugo Rafael	"Higher Ground"	Cristopher Clark	✔	—	N/A	—
Episode 7 (November 08,2026)	Matheus & Kauan	2	—	Jhonny	"Péssimo Negócio"	Gioli	Team Full	—	—	—
Episode 7 (November 08,2026)	Lauana	3	—	Junior Azevedo	"Apaixonadinha"	Anne Louise	Team Full	N/A	—	—
Episode 7 (November 08,2026)	Paulo	4	—	Clara Carolina	"Fé"	Rafa Queiroz	Team Full	—	N/A	—
Episode 7 (November 08,2026)	Diogo	5	—	Milena Amaral	"Crazy"	Paulo Bentes	Team Full	—	—	N/A
Episode 7 (November 08,2026)	Matheus & Kauan	6	—	Malu Casqueiro	"Nessas Horas"	Raissa Barbosa	Team Full	—	—	—
Episode 7 (November 08,2026)	Diogo	7	—	Mariana Lourenço	"Um Dia de Domingo"	Bidesão	Team Full	✔	—	N/A
Episode 7 (November 08,2026)	Lauana	8	—	Rute Lífer	"Tudo"	Duda Torrez	Team Full	Team Full	—	—
Episode 9 (November 15,2026)	Diogo	1	—	ElNatan	"A Carta"	Rafinha Bessa	Team Full	Team Full	—	N/A
Episode 9 (November 15,2026)	Lauana	2	Jade Baraldo	Karine	"Killing Me Softly"	Enická	Team Full	Team Full	—	✔
Episode 9 (November 15,2026)	Matheus & Kauan	3	—	Maluê	"Diz Pra Mim" (Just Give Me a Reason)	Vini Costa	Team Full	Team Full	—	Team Full
Episode 9 (November 15,2026)	Lauana	4	—	Damatta	"Chão de Giz"	Amadeu Brutus	Team Full	Team Full	✔	Team Full
Episode 9 (November 15,2026)	Paulo	5	—	Bella Kahun	"Beija-Flor"	Anderson Mell	Team Full	Team Full	Team Full	Team Full
Episode 9 (November 15,2026)	Matheus & Kauan	6	—	Tefi Sommer	"Wildflower"	Kallen	Team Full	Team Full	Team Full	Team Full
Episode 9 (November 15,2026)	Paulo	7	—	Luna Voice	"Não Quero Mais"	Judye Salles	Team Full	Team Full	Team Full	Team Full
Episode 9 (November 15,2026)	Diogo	8	—	Isaac Lima	"Resposta ao Tempo"	Bell Spalla	Team Full	Team Full	Team Full	Team Full

=== Second Chance Round (Special Phase) ===
Announced by host Tiago Leifert, this stage was designed to offer a second chance to contestants who did not win their "Battle" rounds and were not saved via the "Steal" mechanic. Format and Rules A total of 16 eliminated participants return to compete for just 4 spots to rejoin the reality show’s official cast. The format is divided into two key parts:

• Grouping of Candidates : The 16 singers are split across two special episodes, with 8 contestants featured in each.

• Performances : For this new evaluation, the candidates must perform the same song they sang during their original Blind Auditions.

• Guest Coach : This phase features singer Priscilla, who serves as a special coach and advisor. Together with the "Diamonds of the Season," she is responsible for selecting which contestants advance. At the end of each night, Priscilla chooses 2 participants, resulting in a total of 4 contestants who earn their way back into the competition.The Second Chance episodes are presented in different formats across the show's partner platforms. While the full, uncut episodes are available exclusively via the Disney+ streaming service, the broadcast network SBT airs a compilation featuring the highlights from both nights of performances.

Artist was chosen by the Diamonds and advanced to the second stage.
Artist was chosen by Priscilla based on technique and advanced to the Fire Rounds.
Artist was eliminated

- Ep.8 Priscilla perform "Sua Demais".
- Ep.10 Priscilla perform "Não Testa".

Showdowns results
Episode 8 (November 09,2026)	Diamonds	Order	Artist	Song	Result
Episode 8 (November 09,2026)	Diamonds	1	Bia Vasconcellos	'Where Is My Husband!"	Diamonds choice's
Episode 8 (November 09,2026)	Diamonds	2	Vivi Alves	"Saudade Burra"	Eliminated
Episode 8 (November 09,2026)	Diamonds	3	Everton Pretinho	"Falta Você"	Diamonds choice's
Episode 8 (November 09,2026)	Diamonds	4	Hudson Araújo	"Displicente"	Eliminated
Episode 8 (November 09,2026)	Diamonds	5	Gioli	"Saudade da Gente"	Eliminated
Episode 8 (November 09,2026)	Diamonds	6	Anne Louise	"E.C.T"	Diamonds choice's
Episode 8 (November 09,2026)	Diamonds	7	Paulo Bentes	"Idiota"	Diamonds choice's
Episode 8 (November 09,2026)	Diamonds	8	Rafa Queiroz	"Rock Your Body"	Eliminated
Episode 8 (November 09,2026)	Priscilla				
Episode 8 (November 09,2026)	Priscilla	1	Bia Vasconcellos	'Where Is My Husband!"	Coach choice's
Episode 8 (November 09,2026)	Priscilla	2	Everton Pretinho	"Falta Você"	Eliminated
Episode 8 (November 09,2026)	Priscilla	3	Anne Louise	"E.C.T"	Coach choice's
Episode 8 (November 09,2026)	Priscilla	4	Paulo Bentes	"Idiota"	Eliminated
Episode 10 (November 16,2026)	Diamonds	1	Raissa Barbosa	"Nome Proibido"	Eliminated
Episode 10 (November 16,2026)	Diamonds	2	Duda Torrez	"Iguaria"	Diamonds choice's
Episode 10 (November 16,2026)	Diamonds	3	Rafinha Bessa	"Um Dia, Um Adeus"	Eliminated
Episode 10 (November 16,2026)	Diamonds	4	Vini Costa	"A Noite"	Eliminated
Episode 10 (November 16,2026)	Diamonds	5	Anderson Mell	"Hoje Eu Quero Sair Só"	Diamonds choice's
Episode 10 (November 16,2026)	Diamonds	6	Kallen	"Blank Space"	Eliminated
Episode 10 (November 16,2026)	Diamonds	7	Judye Salles	"Radioactive"	Diamonds choice's
Episode 10 (November 16,2026)	Diamonds	8	Bell Spalla	"Se Eu Quiser Falar Com Deus"	Diamonds choice's
Episode 10 (November 16,2026)	Priscilla	1	Duda Torrez	"Iguaria"	Eliminated
Episode 10 (November 16,2026)	Priscilla	2	Anderson Mell	"Hoje Eu Quero Sair Só"	Eliminated
Episode 10 (November 16,2026)	Priscilla	3	Judye Salles	"Radioactive"	Coach choice's
Episode 10 (November 16,2026)	Priscilla	4	Bell Spalla	"Se Eu Quiser Falar Com Deus"	Coach choice's

== Showdowns ==
In this elimination round, participants perform individually in groups of three, and it is up to the coaches alone to decide who advances to the Semifinals—with no option for other teams to "save" (or "steal") any of the contestants. This stage also marks the return of four singers who earned a second chance through the "Repescagem" (a repechage round evaluated by the season’s "Diamonds" and guest judge Priscilla): Anne Louise, Bia Vasconcellos, Bel Spalla, and Judye Salles. Now reintegrated into their respective teams, they compete for the final spots on equal footing with the other contestants.

Artist was chosen by their coach and advanced to the Live Finals
Artist was eliminated

Showdowns results
Episode	Coach	Order	Artist	Song	Result
Episode	Lauana Prado	1	Bidesão	"Vou Deixar "	Eliminated
Episode	Lauana Prado	2	Damatta	I'm Not the Only One	Eliminated
Episode	Lauana Prado	3	Mali	"Foi Você Quem Trouxe"	Coach choice's
Episode	Diogo Nogueira	4	ElNatan	"Alucinado "	Eliminated
Episode	Diogo Nogueira	5	Milena Amaral	"Vapor Barato"	Coach choice's
Episode	Diogo Nogueira	6	Philippe Sapucaia	"Dois"	Eliminated
Episode	Matheus & Kauan	7	Cristopher Clark	"Cada Palavra"	Eliminated
Episode	Matheus & Kauan	8	Lia Lira	"Não Existe Amor em SP"	Coach choice's
Episode	Matheus & Kauan	9	Tefi Sommer	"Lovely"	Eliminated
Episode	Paulo Ricardo	10	Amadeu Brutus	"Human"	Coach choice's
Episode	Paulo Ricardo	11	Bella Kahun	"Ainda Bem"	Eliminated
Episode	Paulo Ricardo	12	Mayra	"Vênus"	Eliminated
