= The Voice Brasil season 4 =

The Voice Brasil
- Season 4
- Hosted by: Tiago Leifert; Daniele Suzuki
- Judges: Carlinhos Brown; Michel Teló; Lulu Santos; Claudia Leitte
- Winner: Renato Vianna

Release
- Original network: Rede Globo
- Original release: October 1 – December 25, 2015

Season chronology
- ← Previous; Season 3 Next → Season 5

The fourth season of The Voice Brasil premiered on October 1, 2015 on Rede Globo in the 10:30 p.m. slot immediately following the 9 p.m. telenovela A Regra do Jogo.

== Coaches and hosts ==
Three coaches (Lulu Santos, Claudia Leitte and Carlinhos Brown) return for their fourth season. Daniel was replaced by Michel Teló. Tiago Leifert, the host of the show, also returned. Actress Daniele Suzuki return to the show's social media correspondent, after two seasons hiatus.

== Teams ==
Color key

- Winner
- Runner-up
- Eliminated in the Live shows
- Eliminated in the Live playoffs
- Eliminated in the Live showdown
- Artist was stolen by another coach at the Battle rounds
- Eliminated in the Battle rounds

Coaches	Top 48 Artists			
Carlinhos Brown				
Carlinhos Brown	Junior Lord	Paula Sanffer	Agnes Jamille	Rebeca Sauwen
Carlinhos Brown	Gau Silva	Adna Souza	Dani Lino	Matheus Zuck
Carlinhos Brown	Aline Mendes	Júlia Rocha	Larissa Mello	Luísa Amaral
Carlinhos Brown	Maurílio de Oliveira	Selma Fernands		
Michel Teló				
Michel Teló	Renato Vianna	Renan Ribeiro	Edu Santa Fé	Matteus
Michel Teló	Mali	Franciele Karen	Cantor Xanndy	Leo Chaves
Michel Teló	~~Adna Souza~~	~~Brícia Helen~~	~~Paulynha Arrais~~	Eduardo Camiletti
Michel Teló	Marcelo Archetti	Victor Hugo		
Lulu Santos				
Lulu Santos	Ayrton Montarroyos	Joelma Santiago	Jonnata Lima	Tori Huang
Lulu Santos	Cris Silva	Marcos Matarazzo	Nando Vianna	Thais Moreira
Lulu Santos	~~Leo Chaves~~	~~Rebeca Sauwen~~	Ana Cigarra	Negra Mary
Lulu Santos	Rafael Dias	Sarah Lorena		
Claudia Leitte				
Claudia Leitte	Nikki	Brícia Helen	Allice Tirolla	Lorena Ly
Claudia Leitte	Vanessa Macedo	William San'Per	Paulynha Arrais	Tabatha Fher
Claudia Leitte	~~Cantor Xanndy~~	~~Cris Silva~~	~~Joelma Santiago~~	Bella Schneider
Claudia Leitte	Camilla Leonel	Del Feliz		
Note: Italicized names are stolen contestants (names struck through within "stolen from team").

== Blind auditions ==
Color key

✔	Coach hit his/her "I WANT YOU" button
	Artist defaulted to this coach's team
	Artist elected to join this coach's team
	Artist eliminated with no coach pressing his or her "I WANT YOU" button
	Artist is an 'All Star' contestant

=== Episode 1 ===
Aired: October 1, 2015

Group performance

- "Tudo Azul" – The Voice Brasil coaches

Order	Artist	Age	Hometown	Song	Coach's and contestant's choices			
Order	Artist	Age	Hometown	Song	Brown	Teló	Lulu	Claudia
1	Nikki	25	São B. do Campo	"Don't Wake Me Up"	✔	✔	✔	✔
2	Selma Fernands	38	Itapevi	"Travessia"	✔	✔	—	✔
3	Willian San'Per	29	Curitiba	"Velha Infância"	✔	✔	✔	✔
4	Luan Douglas	17	Palmares	"Hoje Eu Tô Terrível"	—	—	—	—
5	Sarah Lorena	18	Sousa	"Laranja"	—	—	✔	—
6	Maurilio de Oliveira	36	Blumenau	"Verdade"	✔	—	—	—
7	Renan Ribeiro	25	Conchal	"Implorando Pra Trair"	✔	✔	✔	✔
8	Rebeca Sauwen	20	Niterói	"Ando Meio Desligado"	✔	✔	✔	✔
9	Camila Profitti	22	São Paulo	"Price Tag"	—	—	—	—
10	Lorena Ly	28	Juscimeira	"Deixa Eu Dizer"	✔	✔	—	✔
11	Edu Santa Fé	36	Goiânia	"Poeira"	✔	✔	—	—
12	Tori Huang	18	Caxias	"Telegrama"	✔	✔	✔	—

=== Episode 2 ===
Aired: October 8, 2015

Coach performance

- "Torpedo" – Lulu Santos

Order	Artist	Age	Hometown	Song	Coach's and contestant's choices			
Order	Artist	Age	Hometown	Song	Brown	Teló	Lulu	Claudia
1	Thaís Moreira	23	Contagem	"Masterpiece"	✔	✔	✔	✔
2	Tabatha Fher	28	Linhares	"Marina"	✔	—	—	✔
3	Franciele Karen	17	Congonhas	"Real Love"	✔	✔	✔	✔
4	Ana Paula Nogueira	26	Barbalha	"Baião"	—	—	—	—
5	Marcos Matarazzo	27	São Fidélis	"Believe"	✔	✔	✔	—
6	Paulynha Arrais	26	Balsas	"Chão de Giz"	—	✔	—	✔
7	Agnes Jamille	27	Uberaba	"Azul"	✔	—	—	—
8	Bruno Faglioni	27	Araraquara	"Pensando em Você"	—	—	—	—
9	Ayrton Montarroyos	20	Recife	"Força Estranha"	—	—	✔	✔
10	Del Feliz	42	Riachão do Jacuípe	"Espumas Ao Vento"	✔	✔	✔	✔
11	Dani Lino	21	Brasília	"Meu Erro"	✔	—	—	—

=== Episode 3 ===
Aired: October 15, 2015

Coach performance

- "Sambo e Beijo" – Carlinhos Brown

Order	Artist	Age	Hometown	Song	Coach's and contestant's choices			
Order	Artist	Age	Hometown	Song	Brown	Teló	Lulu	Claudia
1	Negra Mary	32	Contagem	"Fim de Tarde"	✔	✔	✔	✔
2	Gau Silva	30	São Gonçalo	"Angela"	✔	—	—	—
3	Leo Chaves	37	Taubaté	"Condição"	✔	✔	✔	✔
4	Allice Tirolla	23	Campinas	"Mamma Knows Best"	✔	✔	✔	✔
5	Kassyano Lopes	20	Rondonópolis	"Super Bass"	—	—	—	—
6	Renato Vianna	21	São Paulo	"When a Man Loves a Woman"	✔	✔	✔	✔
7	Camilla Leonel	24	Presidente Prudente	"Pensando Em Você"	—	—	—	✔
8	Matheus Zuck	21	Alpinópolis	"Tudo Que Você Quiser"	✔	—	—	—
9	Pedro Schin	27	Londrina	"Diamonds on the Inside"	—	—	—	—
10	Adna Souza	17	Londrina	"Suíte 14"	✔	✔	✔	✔
11	Fernanda Azevedo	26	Areia Branca	"Xote das Meninas / Asa Branca"	—	—	—	—
12	Larissa Mello	24	Salvador	"Cabide"	✔	—	—	—

=== Episode 4 ===
Aired: October 22, 2015

Coach performance

- "Falando Sério" – Claudia Leitte

Order	Artist	Age	Hometown	Song	Coach's and contestant's choices			
Order	Artist	Age	Hometown	Song	Brown	Teló	Lulu	Claudia
1	Cris Silva	29	Diadema	"If I Ain't Got You"	✔	✔	—	✔
2	Aline Mendes	19	Curitiba	"Fora da Lei"	✔	—	—	—
3	Victor Hugo	23	Campinas	"Always on My Mind"	—	✔	—	—
4	Cobra	21	São Paulo	"XO"	—	—	—	—
5	Paula Sanffer	36	Feira de Santana	"Ai Que Saudade de Ocê"	✔	—	—	✔
6	Bella Schneider	22	Recife	"One"	—	—	—	✔
7	Junior Lord	19	Itaparica	"Sem Você A Vida É Tão Sem Graça"	✔	—	—	—
8	Eduardo Camiletti	21	Vargem Alta	"Escreve Aí"	—	✔	—	✔
9	Julia Rocha	32	Belo Horizonte	"O Homem Falou"	✔	—	—	—
10	Jonnata Lima	31	Rio de Janeiro	"Encontro das Águas"	✔	✔	✔	✔
11	Guilherme Prado	21	Taubaté	"Nocaute"	—	—	—	—
12	Vanessa Macedo	22	São J. dos Campos	"A Noite"	—	—	—	✔

=== Episode 5 ===
Aired: October 29, 2015

Coach performance

- "Tá Quente" – Michel Teló

Order	Artist	Age	Hometown	Song	Coach's and contestant's choices			
Order	Artist	Age	Hometown	Song	Brown	Teló	Lulu	Claudia
1	Matteus	24	São Paulo	"Estou Apaixonado"	✔	✔	✔	✔
2	Joelma Santiago	18	Brasília	"Love on Top"	✔	✔	—	✔
3	Mali	19	São José do Norte	"Sem Querer"	—	✔	✔	—
4	Nando Vianna	29	São Paulo	"Você é Linda"	—	—	✔	—
5	Carol Laudissi	26	Piracicaba	"Fullgás"	—	—	—	—
6	Rafael Dias	31	Belo Horizonte	"Oh Chuva"	✔	—	✔	✔
7	Marcelo Archetti	25	Pato Branco	"You've Got a Friend"	—	✔	✔	—
8	Ana Cigarra	29	Guarujá	"Num Corpo Só"	—	—	✔	—
9	Brícia Helen	19	Ceilândia	"Nobody's Perfect"	✔	✔	Team full	✔
10	Cantor Xanndy	28	Santos	"Meu Bem Querer"	✔	Team full	Team full	✔
11	Liz Rosa	29	Natal	"Fera Ferida"	—	Team full	Team full	Team full
12	Luísa Amaral	17	Manaus	"Hurt"	✔	Team full	Team full	Team full

== The Battle rounds ==
Coaches' advisors
Carlinhos Brown	Michel Teló	Lulu Santos	Claudia Leitte
Rogerio Flausino	Luiza Possi	Di Ferrero	Alexandre Pires

Color key

Artist won the Battle and advances to the Live shows
Artist lost the Battle but was stolen by another coach and advances to the Live shows
Artist lost the Battle and was eliminated

=== Episode 6 ===
Aired: November 5, 2015

Order	Coach	Winner	Song	Loser	Steal result			
Order	Coach	Winner	Song	Loser	Brown	Teló	Lulu	Claudia
1	Claudia	William San'Per	"Want to Want Me"	Cris Silva	—	—	✔	—N/a
2	Teló	Edu Santa Fé	"Tocando Em Frente"	Victor Hugo	—	—N/a	—	—
3	Teló	Renato Vianna	"I'm Not The Only One"	Marcelo Archetti	—	—N/a	—	—
4	Lulu	Thais Moreira	"Crazy"	Rebeca Sauwen	✔	—	—N/a	—
5	Claudia	Tabatha Fher	"Você Não Me Ensinou A Te Esquecer"	Camilla Leonel	—	—	—	—N/a
6	Brown	Paula Sanffer	"Meia Lua Inteira"	Júlia Rocha	—N/a	—	—	—
7	Teló	Matteus	"Fui Fiel"	Paulynha Arrais	—	—N/a	—	✔
8	Lulu	Tori Huang	"Flashlight"	Sarah Lorena	—	—	—N/a	—
9	Brown	Gau Silva	"Meu Lugar"	Selma Fernandes	—N/a	—	—	—
10	Lulu	Marcos Matarazzo	"Woman in Chains"	Ana Cigarra	—	—	—N/a	—
11	Lulu	Ayrton Montarroyos	"Certas Coisas"	Léo Chaves	—	✔	—N/a	—
12	Brown	Dani Lino	"Shake It Off"	Aline Mendes	—N/a	—	—	—

=== Episode 7 ===
Aired: November 11, 2015

Order	Coach	Winner	Song	Loser	Steal result			
Order	Coach	Winner	Song	Loser	Brown	Teló	Lulu	Claudia
1	Teló	Franciele Karen	"Dark Horse"	Brícia Helen	✔	N/A	✔	✔
2	Teló	Renan Ribeiro	"É Com Ela Que Eu Estou"	Adna Souza	✔	N/A	—	Team full
3	Brown	Matheus Zuck	"See You Again"	Luísa Amaral	Team full	—	—	Team full
4	Claudia	Allice Tirolla	"Chandelier "	Joelma Santiago	Team full	✔	✔	Team full
5	Claudia	Vanessa Macedo	"Dia Branco"	Del Feliz	Team full	—	Team full	Team full
6	Brown	Junior Lord	"Carolina"	Maurílio de Oliveira	Team full	—	Team full	Team full
7	Lulu	Jonnata Lima	"Lembra de Mim"	Negra Mary	Team full	—	Team full	Team full
8	Claudia	Lorena Ly	"Juízo Final"	Cantor Xanndy	Team full	✔	Team full	Team full
9	Teló	Mali	"Aquele 1%"	Eduardo Camiletti	Team full	Team full	Team full	Team full
10	Brown	Agnes Jamille	"Caçador de Mim"	Larissa Mello	Team full	Team full	Team full	Team full
11	Claudia	Nikki	"(I Can't Get No) Satisfaction"	Bella Schneider	Team full	Team full	Team full	Team full
12	Lulu	Nando Vianna	"Onde Você Mora?"	Rafael Dias	Team full	Team full	Team full	Team full

== Live shows ==
The live shows is the final phase of the competition. It consists of the showdown, the playoffs, two weekly shows and the season finale.

Viewers in the Amazon time zone (Acre, Amazonas, Rondônia and Roraima) are cued to vote to save artists on the show's official website during the delayed broadcast.

=== Elimination chart ===
Artist's info

- Artist from Team Brown
- Artist from Team Teló
- Artist from Team Lulu
- Artist from Team Claudia

Result details

- Artist was the winner
- Artist was runner-up
- Artist was saved by the fast pass
- Artist was saved by the public vote
- Artist was saved by his/her coach
- Artist did not perform
- Artist was part of the team's bottom three or two
- Artist was eliminated
- Artist advanced to the finals
- Artist received the fewest points and was eliminated

Live show results per week
Artist	Week 1	Week 2	Week 3	Week 4	Week 5	Finals
Renato Vianna	Safe		Safe	Safe	Advanced	Winner
Ayrton Montarroyos	Safe		Safe	Safe	Advanced	Runner-up
Junior Lord	Safe		Safe	Safe	Advanced	Runner-up
Nikki	Safe	Bottom two		Bottom three	Advanced	Runner-up
Brícia Helen	Safe		Safe	Safe	Eliminated	Eliminated (week 5)
Joelma Santiago	Safe		Bottom two	Bottom three	Eliminated	Eliminated (week 5)
Paula Sanffer	Safe	Bottom two		Bottom three	Eliminated	Eliminated (week 5)
Renan Ribeiro	Safe		Bottom two	Bottom three	Eliminated	Eliminated (week 5)
Agnes Jamille	Safe	Safe		Eliminated	Eliminated (week 4)	
Allice Tirolla	Safe	Safe		Eliminated	Eliminated (week 4)	
Edu Santa Fé	Safe	Safe		Eliminated	Eliminated (week 4)	
Jonnata Lima	Safe	Bottom two		Eliminated	Eliminated (week 4)	
Lorena Ly	Safe		Bottom two	Eliminated	Eliminated (week 4)	
Matteus	Safe	Bottom two		Eliminated	Eliminated (week 4)	
Rebeca Sauwen	Safe		Bottom two	Eliminated	Eliminated (week 4)	
Tori Huang	Safe	Safe		Eliminated	Eliminated (week 4)	
Cris Silva	Safe		Eliminated	Eliminated (week 3)		
Gau Silva	Safe		Eliminated	Eliminated (week 3)		
Mali	Safe		Eliminated	Eliminated (week 3)		
Vanessa Macedo	Safe		Eliminated	Eliminated (week 3)		
Adna Souza	Safe	Eliminated	Eliminated (week 2)			
Marcos Matarazzo	Safe	Eliminated	Eliminated (week 2)			
Franciele Karen	Safe	Eliminated	Eliminated (week 2)			
William San'Per	Safe	Eliminated	Eliminated (week 2)			
Cantor Xanndy	Eliminated	Eliminated (week 1)				
Dani Lino	Eliminated	Eliminated (week 1)				
Leo Chaves	Eliminated	Eliminated (week 1)				
Nando Vianna	Eliminated	Eliminated (week 1)				
Matheus Zuck	Eliminated	Eliminated (week 1)				
Paulynha Arrais	Eliminated	Eliminated (week 1)				
Tabatha Fher	Eliminated	Eliminated (week 1)				
Thais Moreira	Eliminated	Eliminated (week 1)				

=== Episode 8 ===
Aired: November 18, 2015

Live Showdown

In the Live Showdown round, 16 artists (4 per team) were given a "fast pass" by their coaches, while the remaining 16 competed for 8 spots in the Live Playoffs.

Fast Passes

Order	Coach	Artists			
1	Lulu	Joelma Santiago	Jonnata Lima	Marcos Matarazzo	Tori Huang
2	Teló	Edu Santa Fé	Franciele Karen	Matteus	Renato Vianna
3	Claudia	Allice Tirolla	Lorena Ly	Nikki	William San'Per
4	Brown	Adna Souza	Agnes Jamille	Paula Sanffer	Rebeca Sauwen

Order	Coach	Artist	Song	Result
1	Lulu	Ayrton Montarroyos	"Nunca"	44% (out of 4)
2	Lulu	Cris Silva	"Blues da Piedade"	Coach's choice
3	Lulu	Nando Vianna	"Kiss from a Rose"	Eliminated
4	Lulu	Thaís Moreira	"Marvin"	Eliminated
5	Teló	Cantor Xanndy	"Ainda Bem"	Eliminated
6	Teló	Leo Chaves	"Fly Away"	Eliminated
7	Teló	Mali	"Only Girl (In the World)"	46% (out of 4)
8	Teló	Renan Ribeiro	"Recaídas"	Coach's choice
9	Claudia	Brícia Helen	"Pretty Hurts"	42% (out of 4)
10	Claudia	Paulynha Arrais	"Logo Eu"	Eliminated
11	Claudia	Tabatha Fher	"Mercedes Benz"	Eliminated
12	Claudia	Vanessa Macedo	"Amado"	Coach's choice
13	Brown	Dani Lino	"Love Me like You Do"	Eliminated
14	Brown	Gau Silva	"O Mundo é Um Moinho"	Coach's choice
15	Brown	Junior Lord	"Coleção"	42% (out of 4)
16	Brown	Matheus Zuck	"Que Sorte a Nossa"	Eliminated

=== Episode 9 ===
Aired: November 26, 2015

Live Playoffs 1
Guest performance

- "Romaria" – Michel Teló & Daniel

Order	Coach	Artist	Song	Result
1	Brown	Adna Souza	"Uma Louca Tempestade"	Eliminated
2	Brown	Agnes Jamille	"Like a Star"	38% (out of 3)
3	Brown	Paula Sanffer	"Chove Chuva"	Coach's choice
4	Claudia	Allice Tirolla	"Skyfall"	46% (out of 3)
5	Claudia	Nikki	"Não Pára"	Coach's choice
6	Claudia	Willian San'Per	"Réu Confesso"	Eliminated
7	Lulu	Jonnata Lima	"Açai"	Coach's choice
8	Lulu	Marcos Matarazzo	"Bohemian Rhapsody"	Eliminated
9	Lulu	Tori Huang	"We Found Love"	45% (out of 3)
10	Teló	Edu Santa Fé	"Luar do Sertão"	53% (out of 3)
11	Teló	Franciele Karen	"Clarity"	Eliminated
12	Teló	Matteus	"Caso Indefinido"	Coach's choice

=== Episode 10 ===
Aired: December 3, 2015

Live Playoffs 2
Guest performance

- "Dia Iluminado" – Carlinhos Brown & David Bisbal

Order	Coach	Artist	Song	Result
1	Teló	Mali	"Domino"	Eliminated
2	Teló	Renan Ribeiro	"Cuida Bem Dela"	Coach's choice
3	Teló	Renato Vianna	"Billie Jean"	55% (out of 3)
4	Claudia	Brícia Helen	"No One"	60% (out of 3)
5	Claudia	Lorena Ly	"O Que é o Amor"	Coach's choice
6	Claudia	Vanessa Macedo	"Lost Stars"	Eliminated
7	Brown	Gau Silva	"Estranha Loucura"	Eliminated
8	Brown	Junior Lord	"A Lua e Eu"	64% (out of 3)
9	Brown	Rebeca Sauwen	"Right to Be Wrong"	Coach's choice
10	Lulu	Ayrton Montarroyos	"Carinhoso"	65% (out of 3)
11	Lulu	Cris Silva	"Cold War"	Eliminated
12	Lulu	Joelma Santiago	"Que Nem Maré"	Coach's choice

=== Episode 11 ===
Aired: December 10, 2015

Round of 16

Order	Coach	Artist	Song	Result
1	Brown	Agnes Jamille	"Let's Stay Together"	Eliminated
2	Brown	Junior Lord	"Pérola Negra"	54% (out of 4)
3	Brown	Paula Sanffer	"Uma Brasileira"	Coach's choice
4	Brown	Rebeca Sauwen	"She's Leaving Home"	Eliminated
5	Claudia	Allice Tirolla	"Minha Alma"	Eliminated
6	Claudia	Brícia Helen	"All About That Bass"	41% (out of 4)
7	Claudia	Lorena Ly	"Encontros e Despedidas"	Eliminated
8	Claudia	Nikki	"Wrecking Ball"	Coach's choice
9	Lulu	Ayrton Montarroyos	"Cálice"	44% (out of 4)
10	Lulu	Joelma Santiago	"Who Are You"	Coach's choice
11	Lulu	Jonnata Lima	"Coração Leviano"	Eliminated
12	Lulu	Tori Huang	"Bem Que Se Quis"	Eliminated
13	Teló	Edu Santa Fé	"Tristeza do Jeca"	Eliminated
14	Teló	Matteus	"Te Esperando"	Eliminated
15	Teló	Renan Ribeiro	"Maus Bocados"	Coach's choice
16	Teló	Renato Vianna	"Oh! Darling"	52% (out of 4)

=== Episode 12 ===
Aired: December 17, 2015

Semifinals

Performances

- "Noite" - Lulu Santos & Silva & Don L; "Corazón" - Claudia Leitte feat. Daddy Yankee

Order	Coach	Artist	Song	Points		
Order	Coach	Artist	Song	Coach	Public	Total
1	Lulu	Ayrton Montarroyos	"Olhos Nos Olhos"	20	62	82
2	Lulu	Joelma Santiago	"Mentira"	10	38	48
3	Brown	Junior Lord	"Céu Azul"	10	58	68
4	Brown	Paula Sanffer	"Azul Como A Cor do Mar"	20	42	62
5	Teló	Renan Ribeiro	"Azul"	10	22	32
6	Teló	Renato Vianna	"Who Wants to Live Forever"	20	78	98
7	Claudia	Brícia Helen	"Como 2 e 2"	10	44	54
8	Claudia	Nikki	"Hello"	20	56	76

=== Episode 13 ===
Aired: December 25, 2015

Final

Coach	Artist	Order	Solo song	Order	Duet song	Result
Claudia	Nikki	1	"Maluco Beleza/Metamorfose Ambulante/Gita"	7	"Is This Love" (with Claudia)	Runner-up
Teló	Renato Vianna	8	"Por Enquanto"	2	"A Minha Vida (My Way)" (with Teló)	Winner (56%)
Lulu	Ayrton Montarroyos	3	"Fascinação"	6	"Eu Só Quero Um Xodó" (with Lulu)	Runner-up
Brown	Junior Lord	5	"Primavera"	4	"Magamalabares" (with Brown)	Runner-up

Non-competition performances:

Order	Performer	Song
1	Top 4	"Óculos"
2	Lulu Santos	"Xibom Bom Bom"
3	Di Ferrero, Luiza Possi e Rogério Flausino	"Brasil"
4	Alexandre Pires e Bella Schneider	"Lança Perfume"
5	Claudia Leitte	"Shiver Down My Spine"
6	Michel Teló	"Ah Tá Peraê"
7	Carlinhos Brown	"Canção do Lar Natal"
8	Renato Vianna	"When a Man Loves a Woman" (Winner's song)

== Ratings ==
=== Brazilian ratings ===
All numbers are in points and provided by IBOPE.

Week	Episode	Air Date	Time slot (BRT)	Viewers (in points)	Rank Timeslot	Source
1	The Blind Auditions 1	October 1, 2015	Thursday 10:30 p.m.	20.2	1	
2	The Blind Auditions 2	October 8, 2015	Thursday 10:30 p.m.	18.8	1	
3	The Blind Auditions 3	October 15, 2015	Thursday 10:30 p.m.	19.8	1	
4	The Blind Auditions 4	October 22, 2015	Thursday 10:30 p.m.	20.1	1	
5	The Blind Auditions 5	October 29, 2015	Thursday 10:30 p.m.	21.7	1	
6	The Battles 1	November 5, 2015	Thursday 10:30 p.m.	21.6	1	
7	The Battles 2	November 11, 2015	Wednesday 10:30 p.m.	21.1	1	
8	Live Showdown	November 18, 2015	Wednesday 10:30 p.m.	20.1	1	
9	Live Playoffs 1	November 26, 2015	Thursday 10:30 p.m.	18.9	1	
10	Live Playoffs 2	December 3, 2015	Thursday 10:30 p.m.	19.9	1	
11	Round of 16	December 10, 2015	Thursday 10:30 p.m.	19.3	1	
12	Semifinals	December 17, 2015	Thursday 10:30 p.m.	20.8	1	
13	Final	December 25, 2015	Friday 10:30 p.m.	21.0	1	

- In 2015, each point represents 67.000 households in São Paulo.
