= The Voice Brasil =

Brazilian reality talent show

- Genre: Reality show
- Created by: John de Mol Jr.; Roel van Velzen
- Directed by: J. B. de Oliveira; Carlos Magalhães
- Presented by: Tiago Leifert; André Marques; Fátima Bernardes
- Judges: Lulu Santos; Carlinhos Brown; Claudia Leitte; Daniel; Michel Teló; Ivete Sangalo; Iza; Gaby Amarantos; Matheus & Kauan; Duda Beat; Péricles; Mumuzinho; Lauana Prado; Paulo Ricardo; Diogo Nogueira
- Country of origin: Brazil
- Original language: Portuguese
- No. of seasons: 13
- No. of episodes: 196

Production
- Producer: J. B. de Oliveira
- Production locations: Rio de Janeiro, Brazil
- Cinematography: Multi-camera
- Running time: 90 minutes
- Production companies: Talpa Media (2012–2019); Endemol Shine Brasil (2012–2019); ITV Studios (2020–2023); Formatta Produções (2025–present); The Walt Disney Company (2025–present)

Original release
- Network: TV Globo
- Release: 23 September 2012 – 28 December 2023
- Network: SBT
- Release: 6 October 2025 – present

Related
- The Voice (franchise); The Voice of Holland; The Voice Kids; The Voice +

The Voice Brasil is a Brazilian reality talent show which premiered on TV Globo on 23 September 2012. Based on the original The Voice of Holland, and part of an international franchise created by Dutch television producer John de Mol Jr.

The original coaches for the first three seasons were Lulu Santos, Carlinhos Brown, Claudia Leitte and Daniel. Daniel departed after season three and was replaced by Michel Teló. Leitte last coaches on season five, moving to the junior version, The Voice Kids, swapping roles with Ivete Sangalo. Carlinhos Brown did not return for season eight, being replaced by Iza; hence, Lulu Santos was the only coach left from the inaugural season.

On 28 August 2023, Globo announced that the twelfth season would be the last, thus cancelling the Brazilian version of the franchise entirely. Notwithstanding, it was announced on 20 January 2024, that the networks Record TV and SBT, were discussing about reviving the series. After several rumours, it has been confirmed on 14 March 2025 that the show would return for its thirteenth season, now broadcast on SBT, and hosted by Tiago Leifert, after a three-season hiatus, with confirmed coaches Mumuzinho, Duda Beat, Péricles and duo Matheus & Kauan.

== Format ==
The series is part of The Voice franchise and is based on a similar competition format in The Netherlands entitled The Voice of Holland. The winner is entitled to a R$ 500.000 prize and a recording contract with Universal Music Group.

=== Blind auditions ===
In The Blind Auditions, the four coaches form their team of artists whom they mentor through the remainder of the season. Each judge has the length of the auditionee's performance to decide if he or she wants that singer on his or her team; if two or more judges want the same singer then the singer gets to choose which coach they want to work with. Since season seven, a new twist called "Block" is featured, which allows one coach to block another coach from getting a contestant.

=== Battle rounds ===
In The Battles, each coach pairs two of his or her team members to perform together, then chooses one to advance. Coaches are given "steals" (3 in seasons 1–2 and 7-9; 2 in seasons 3–6), allowing each coach to select individuals who were eliminated during a battle round by another coach. In season 10, for the first time, no "steals" are available, and only the fifth coach, Teló, could select eliminated artists to participate in the Comeback Stage. In season 11, the steals then returned, with two steals available for each coach.

=== Live shows ===
In the final phase, the remaining contestants of each team will compete against each other in 4–7 weeks of live broadcasts. The television audience will help to decide who moves on. When one team member remains for each coach, these four contestants will compete against each other in the finale, with the most voted singer declared the season's winner.

==== Coaches' Battle ====
Introduced in season five, in the Coaches' Battle, two contestants from two teams battle against each other and the public vote determines who will advance. In season 10, the winner of the battle is decided by the three coaches not involved in the battle. In season 11, the winner is decided in consensus by the two coaches not involved in the battle.

==== Remix ====
Introduced in season five, the Remix round is a way to balance the teams after the Coaches' Battle, which works exactly like the Blind Auditions.

== Coaches ==
The original coaches were revealed in to be axé singer Claudia Leitte, pop rock singer-songwriter Lulu Santos, MPB singer-songwriter Carlinhos Brown and sertanejo singer, Daniel. All four coaches returned for seasons two and three. In 2015, it was announced that Daniel would not return for season four; sertanejo singer Michel Teló was named his replacement. Leitte took a hiatus after season five, swapping roles with Ivete Sangalo to become a coach on The Voice Kids.

In 2019, it was announced that Iza would join Santos, Teló and Sangalo as coach of season eight, making it the first season to feature two female coaches. With Brown's departure, Santos served as the last remaining coach from the show's inaugural season. In 2020, Globo announced that Sangalo, Iza, Santos, and Teló would be returning for the ninth season. However, on 29 July 2020, Brown was confirmed to return to the panel, replacing Sangalo, who had to leave due to her pregnancy.

In August 2021, the tenth season was confirmed to premiere in October, featuring coaches Brown, Iza, Lulu, and Leitte, the latter returning after a four-year hiatus. In addition, Teló, joins the panel as a "Comeback Stage" coach, selecting eliminated artists and giving them a chance to return to the competition. As phases go by, Teló joins the four coaches on the main stage, having a fifth chair in the scenario for the first time in the Brazilian series.

For the eleventh season, Lulu, Iza and Teló returned alongside The Voice Kids coach Gaby Amarantos. On 28 August 2023, it was confirmed that the program would return for a twelfth and final season. Two days later, the coaches for the final season were announced to be Brown, Iza, Santos, and Teló. During the blind auditions, The Voice+ coach Mumuzinho acted as a guest coach, taking turns with Iza in the coaches' chair.

Following the confirmation of a thirteenth season on SBT, on 16 April 2025, season 12 guest coach Mumuzinho was confirmed as an official coach for season 13. On 5 June, Duda Beat was confirmed as a panelist for the thirteenth season, and duo Matheus & Kauan were "in talks" about joining. Lulu Santos was initially quoted as a panelist but later denied. On 20 August, Matheus & Kauan were confirmed as panelists, along the with fourth confirmed coach, Péricles. On 3 July 2026, Lauana Prado was announced as a new coach, replacing Duda Beat for the fourteenth season. On 30 July 2026, it was announced that Matheus & Kauan would return for the fourteenth season alongside new coaches Paulo Ricardo and Diogo Nogueira, both of whom replace Péricles and Mumuzinho.

=== Timeline ===
Key
Full-time coach
Part-time coach
Advisor
Guest

Coach	Seasons													
Coach	1	2	3	4	5	6	7	8	9	10	11	12	13	14
Lulu Santos														
Carlinhos Brown														
Claudia Leitte														
Daniel														
Michel Teló														
Ivete Sangalo														
Iza														
Gaby Amarantos														
Matheus & Kauan														
Duda Beat														
Péricles														
Mumuzinho														
Lauana Prado														
Paulo Ricardo														
Diogo Nogueira														

=== Gallery ===
Coaches gallery

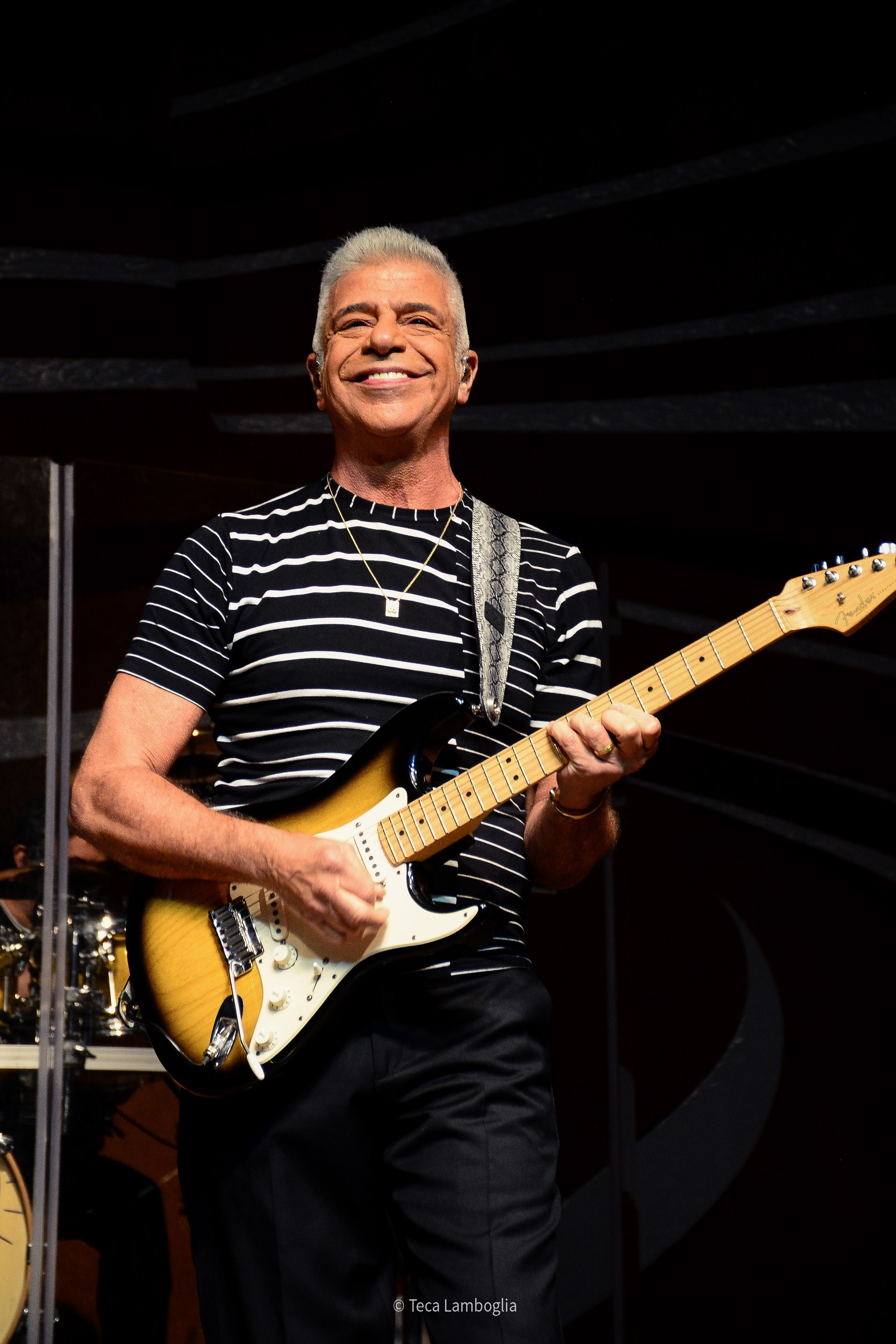
Lulu Santos (1–12)

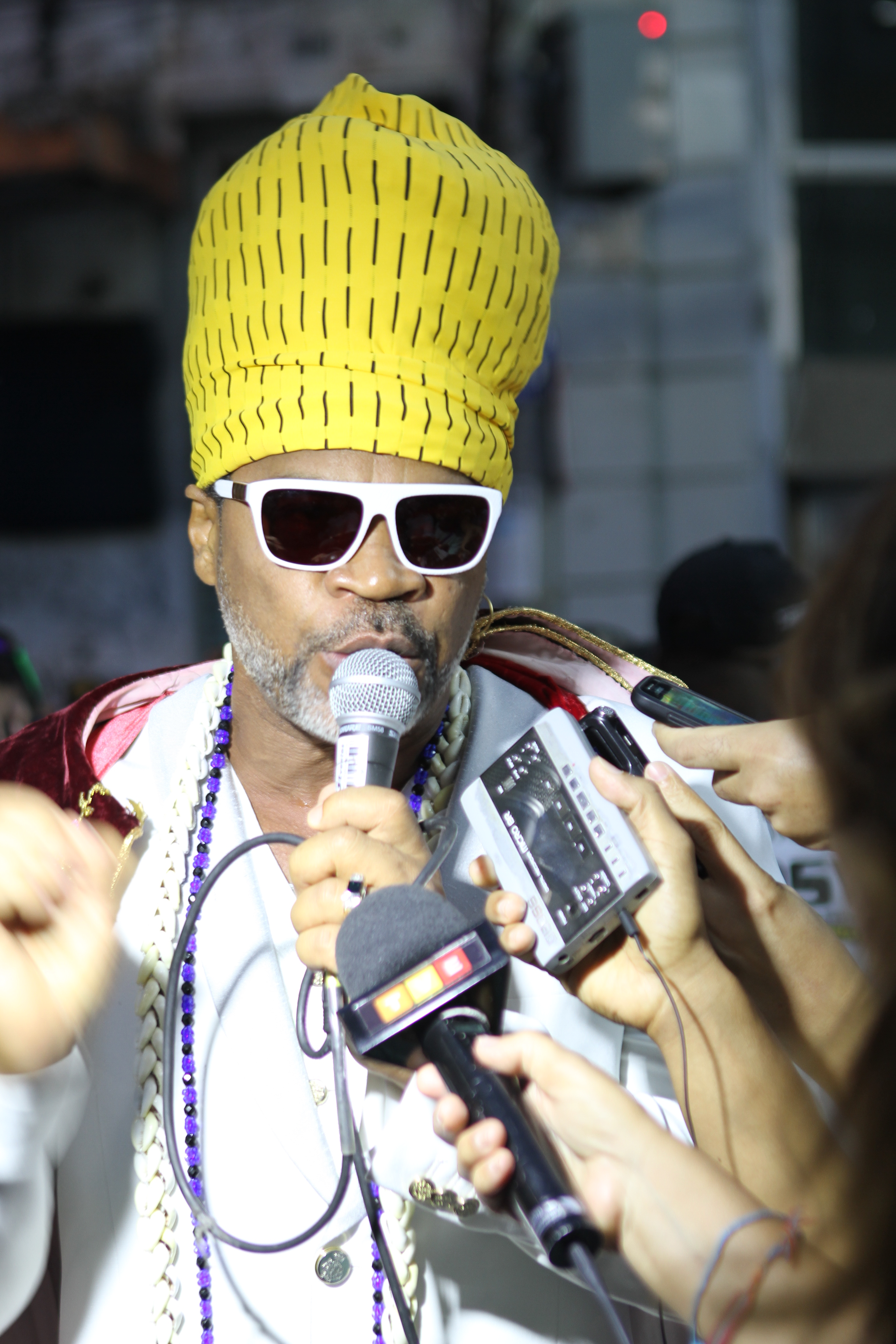
Carlinhos Brown (1–7, 9–10, 12)

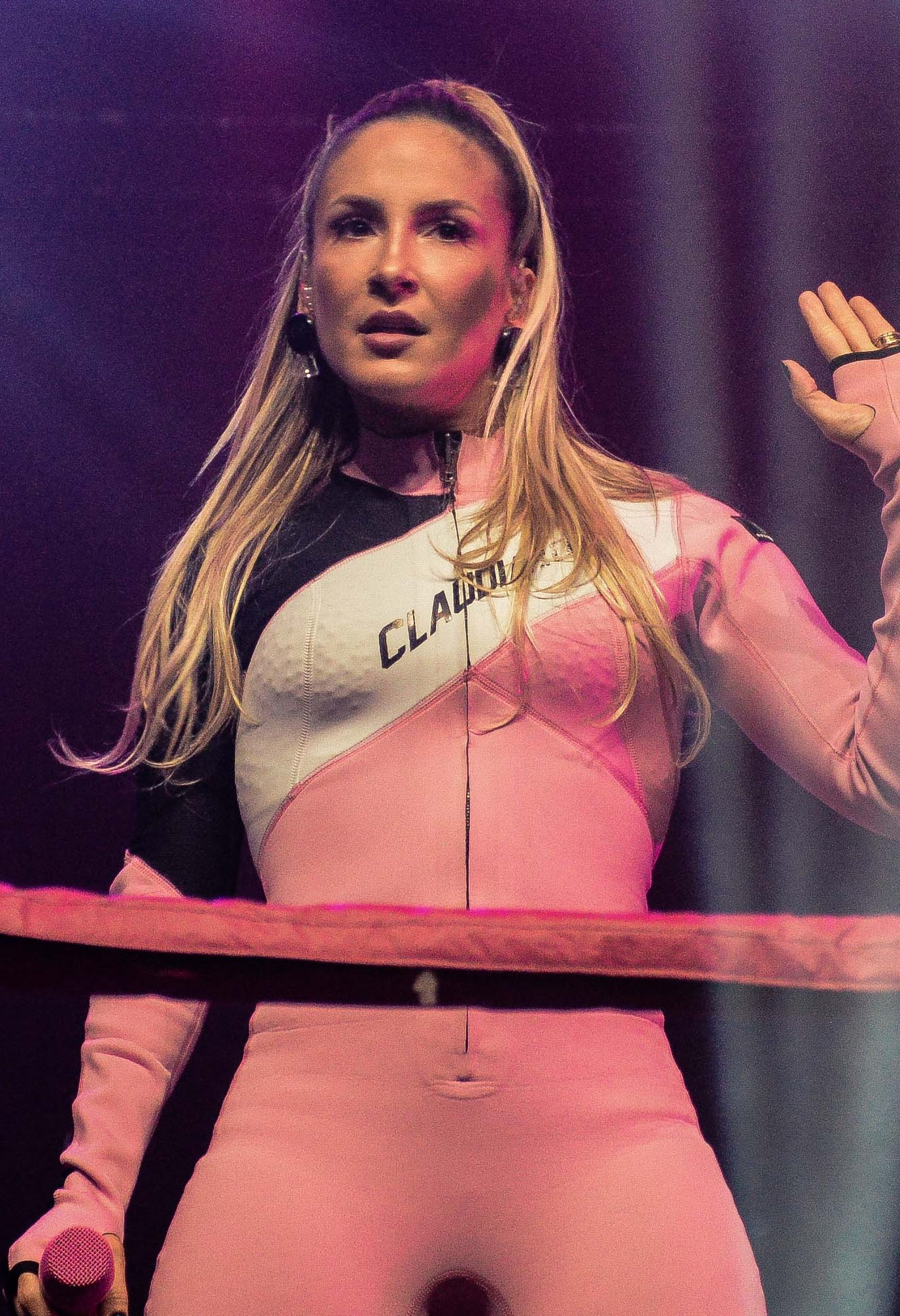
Claudia Leitte (1–5, 10)

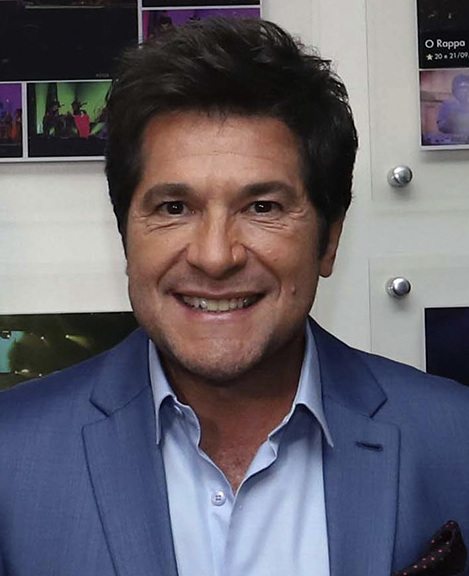
Daniel (1–3)

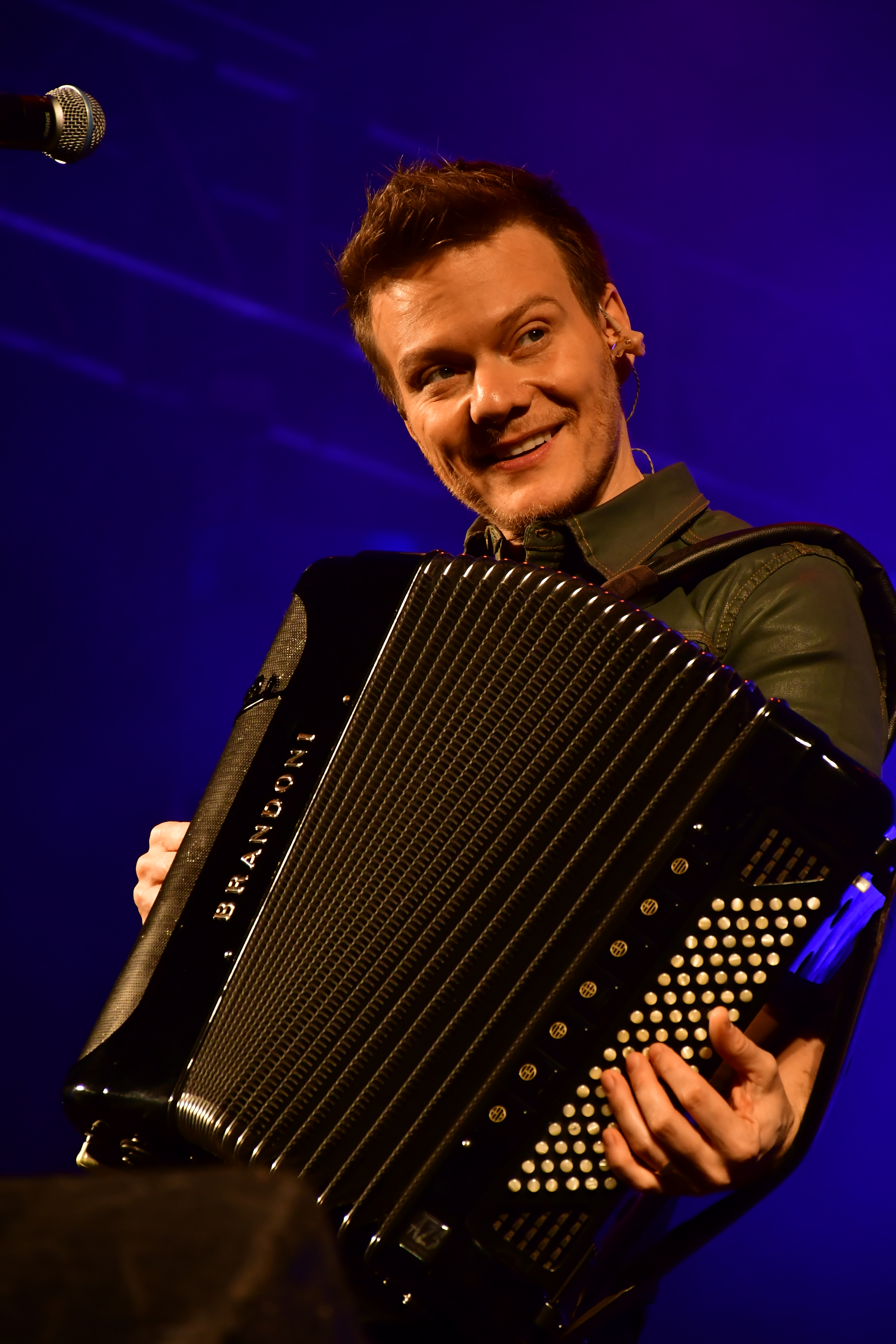
Michel Teló (4–12)

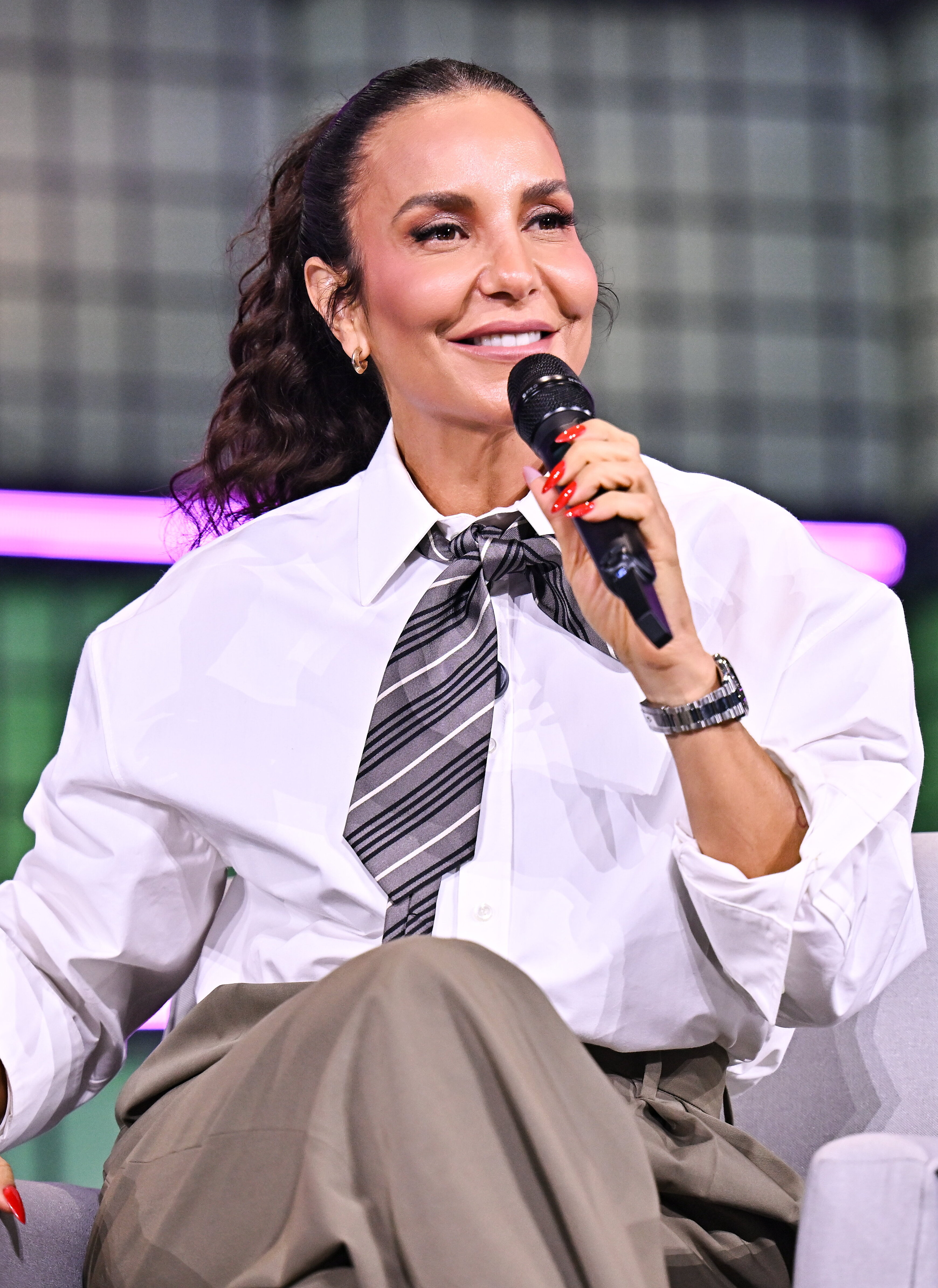
Ivete Sangalo (6–8)

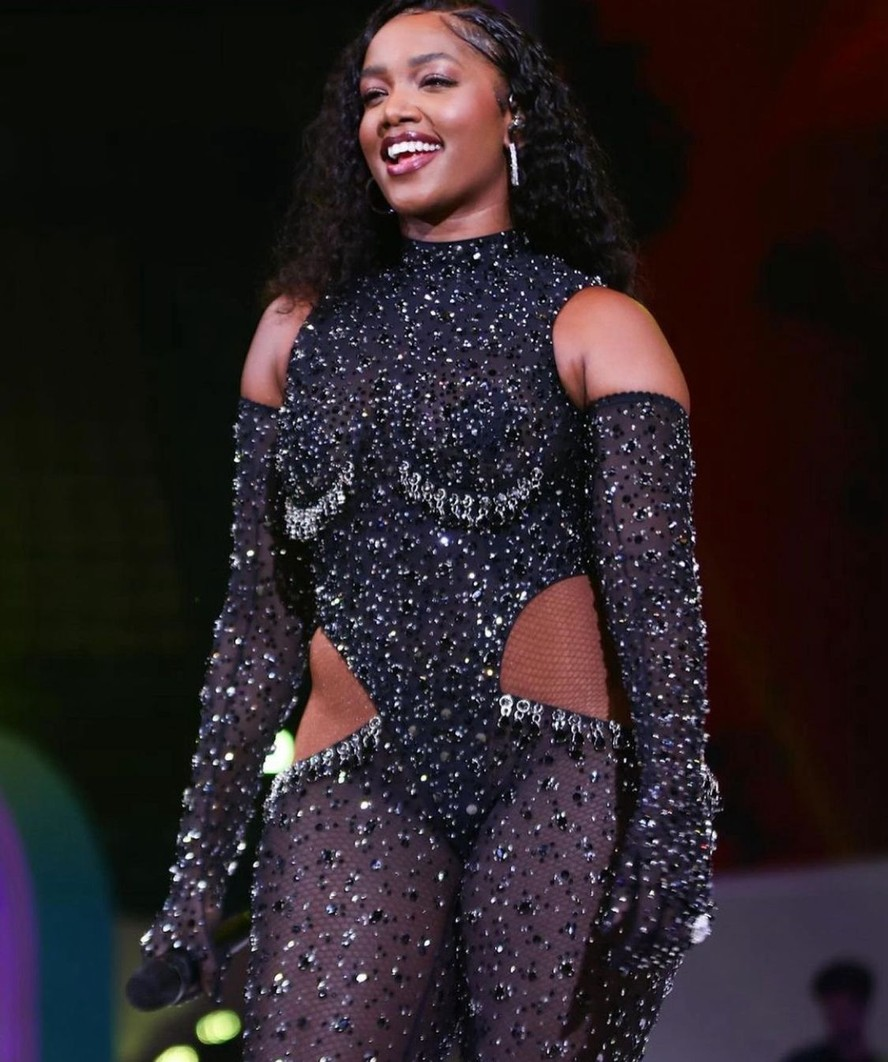
Iza (8–12)

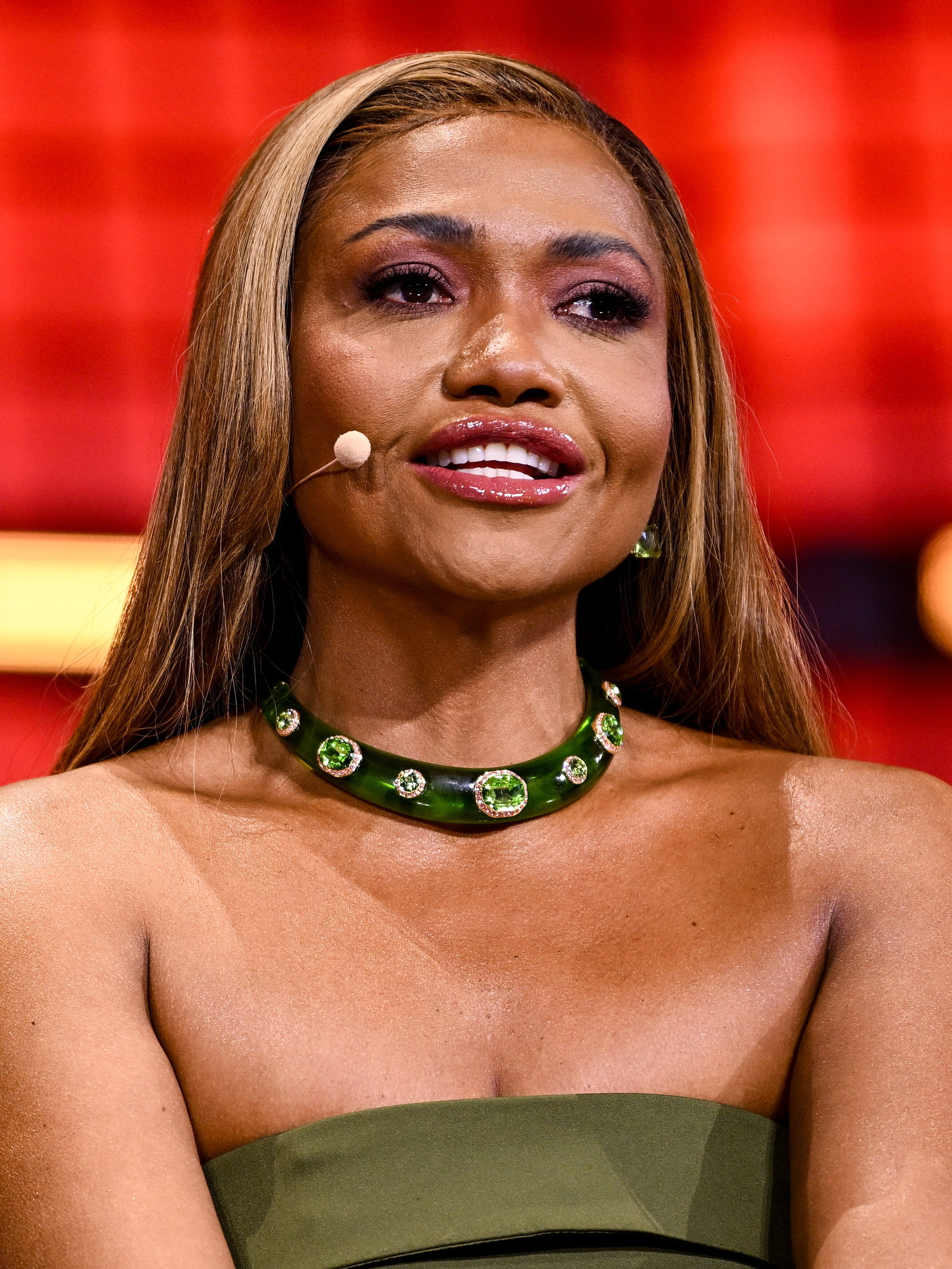
Gaby Amarantos (11)

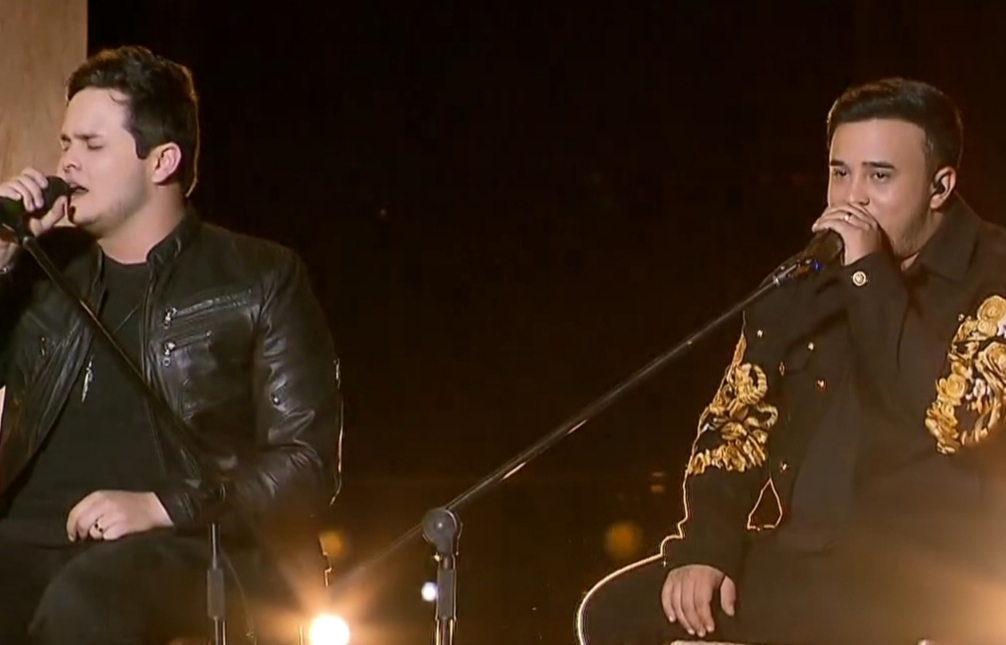
Matheus & Kauan (13–present)

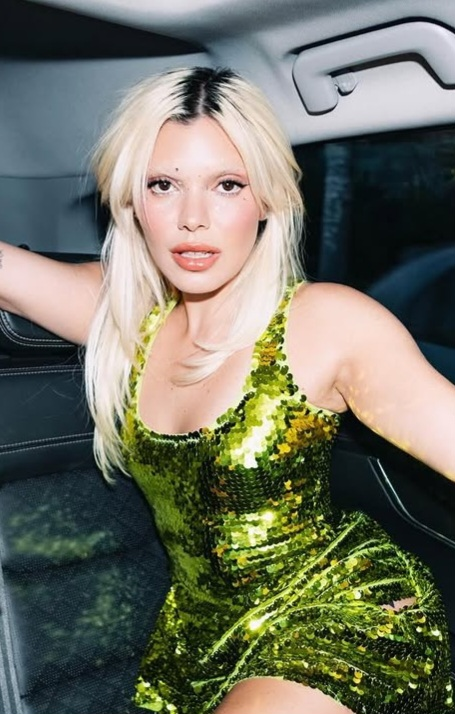
Duda Beat (13)

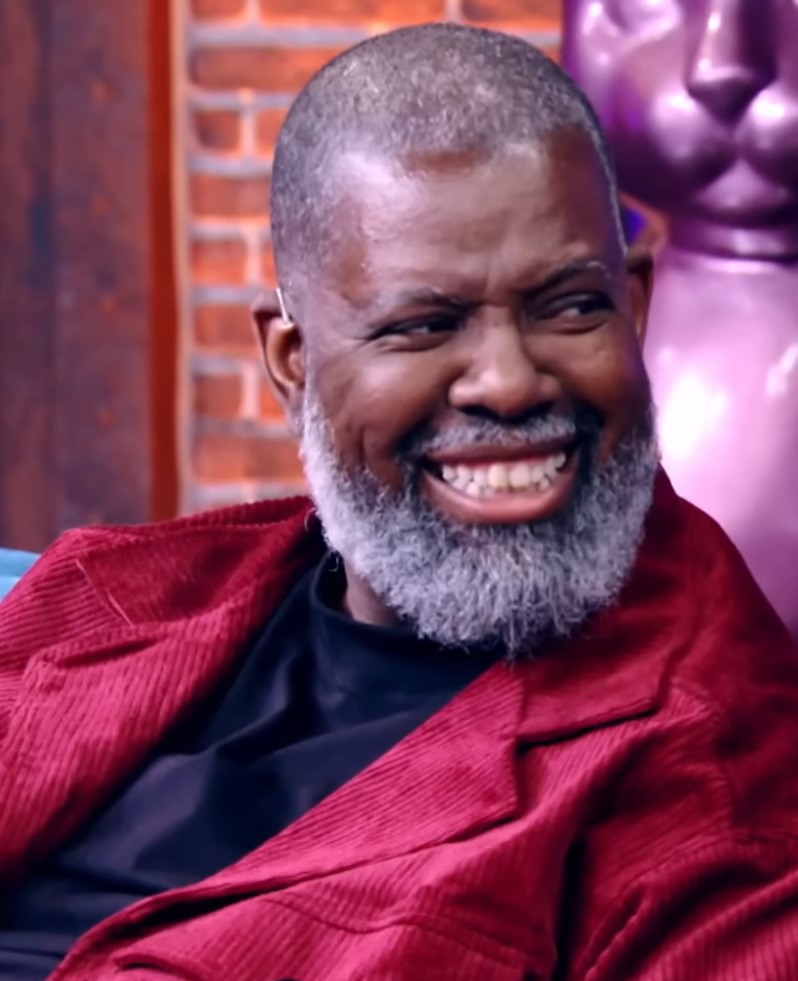
Péricles (13)

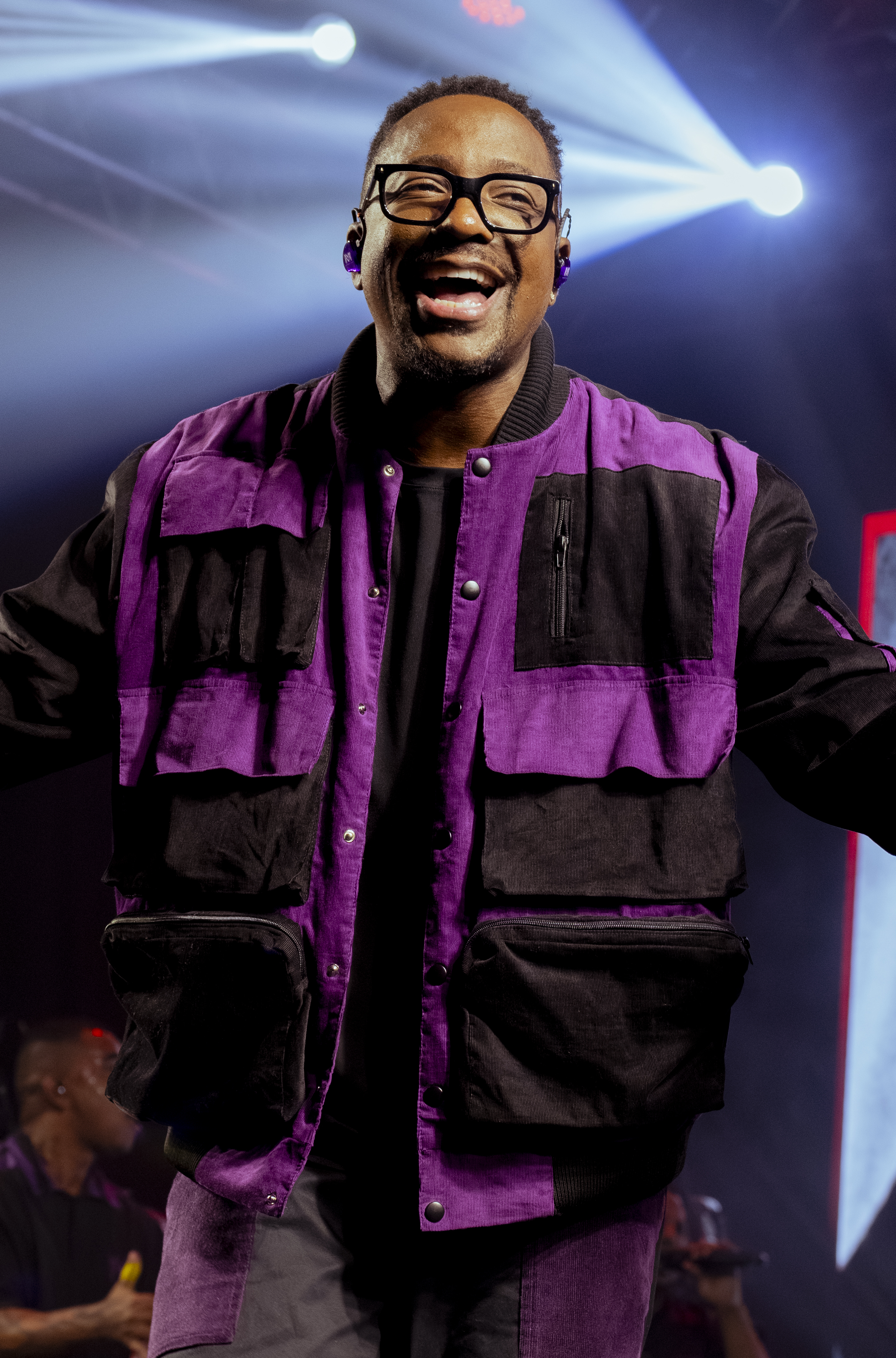
Mumuzinho (13)

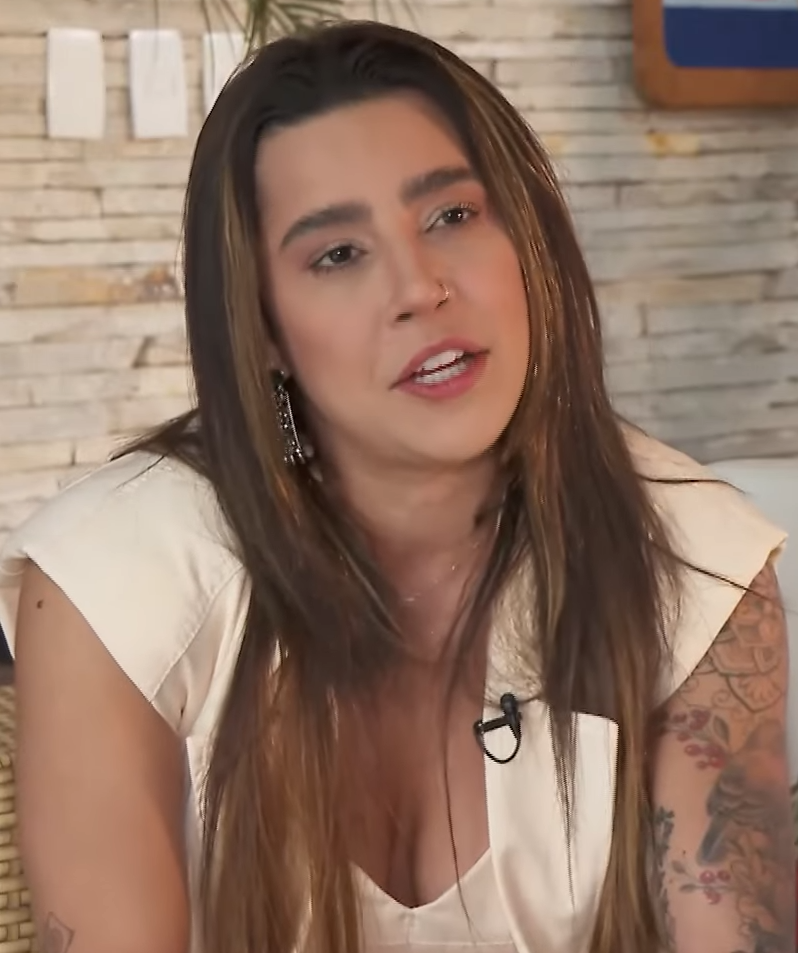
Lauana Prado (14–present)

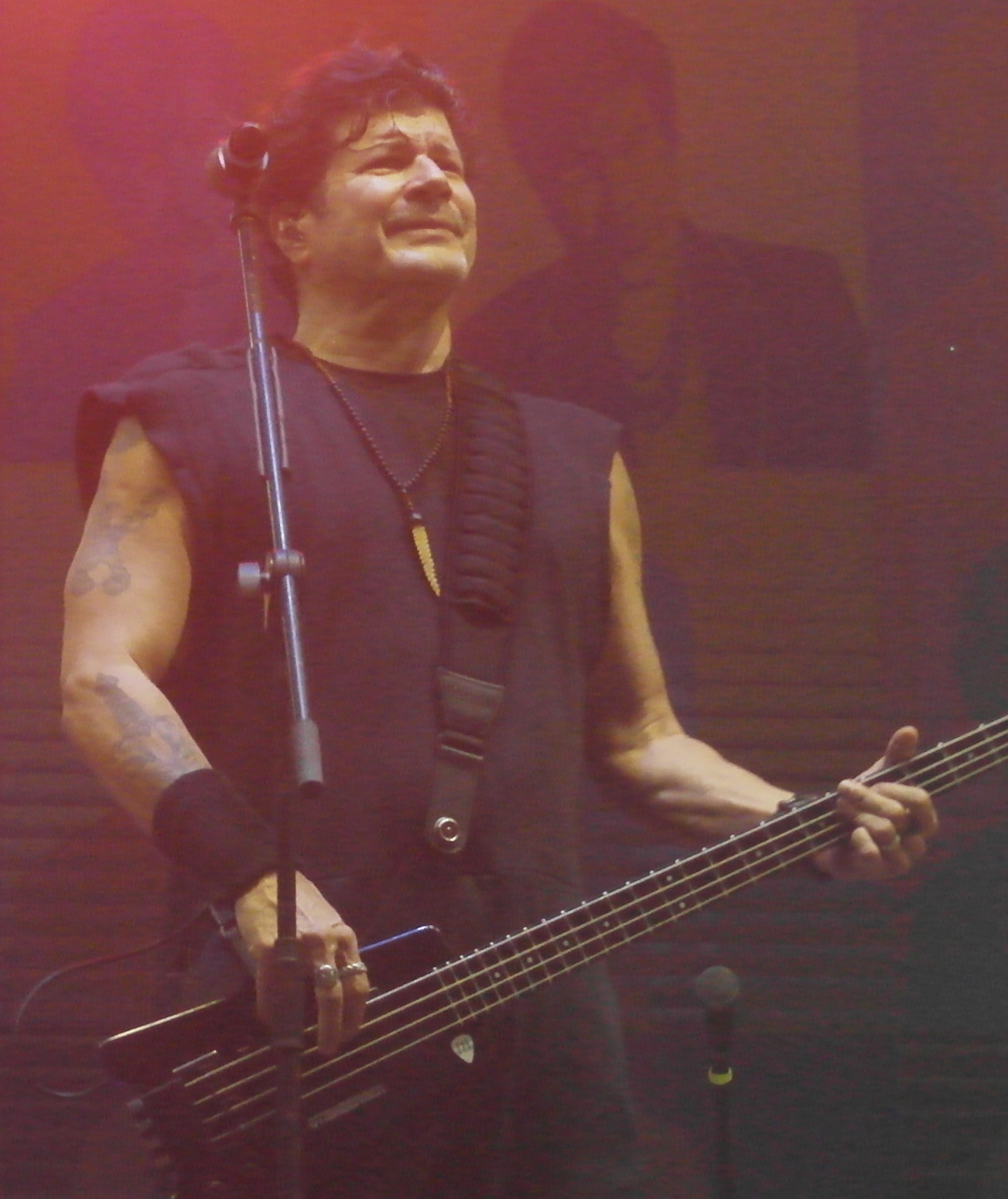
Paulo Ricardo (14–present)

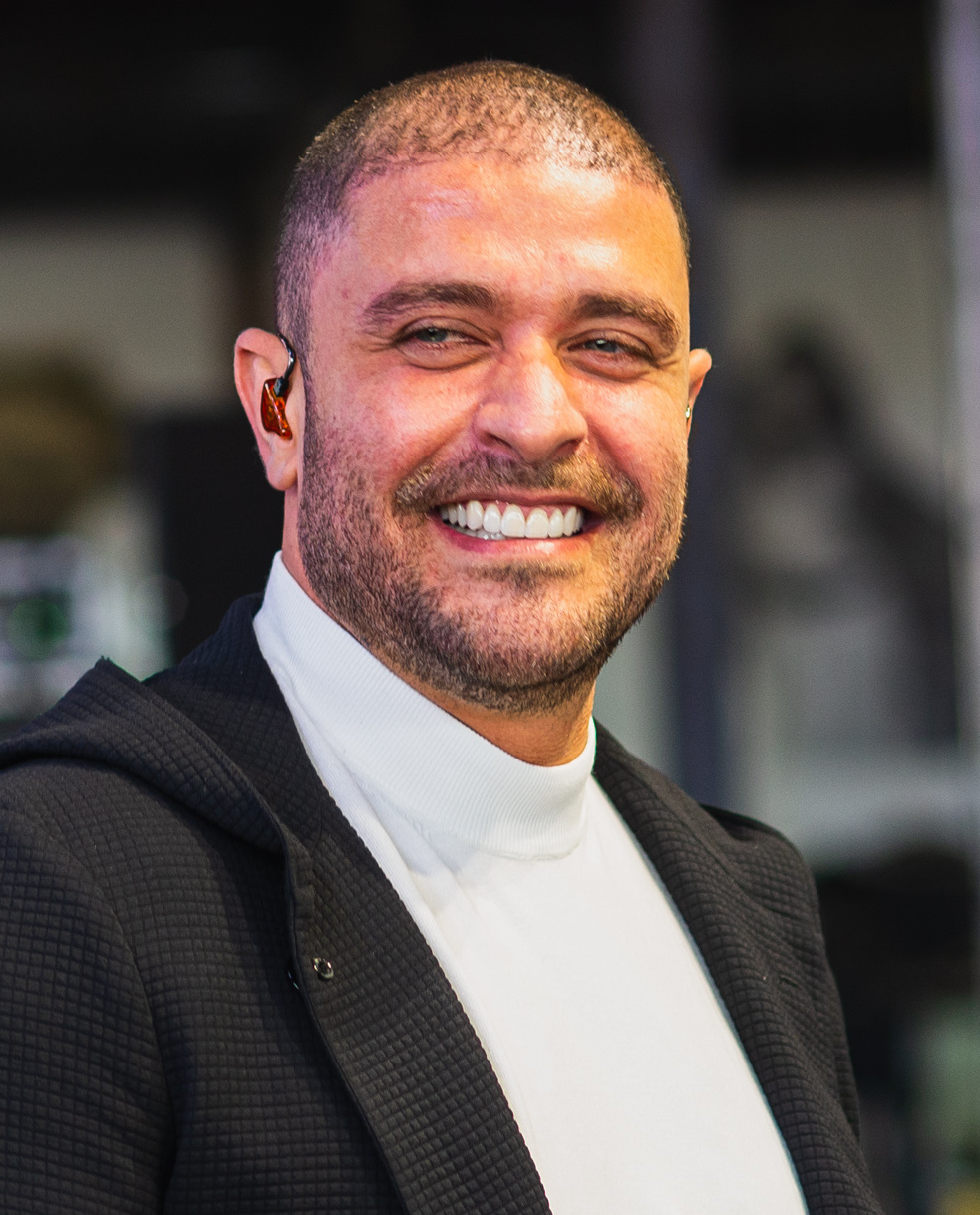
Diogo Nogueira (14–present)

=== Coaches' advisers and guests ===
Season	Coaches and respective adviser			
1	Lulu Santos	Carlinhos Brown	Claudia Leitte	Daniel
1	Preta Gil ^{†}	Rogerio Flausino	Ed Motta	Luiza Possi
1	Erasmo Carlos	Margareth Menezes	Ivete Sangalo	Alexandre Pires
1	—N/a	Sérgio Mendes	—N/a	
1	Lulu Santos	Carlinhos Brown	Claudia Leitte	Daniel
2	Gaby Amarantos	Rogerio Flausino	Maria Gadú	Luiza Possi
2	Gabriel o Pensador	—N/a	Zeca Baleiro	—N/a
2	Jota Quest			
3	Claudia Leitte	Lulu Santos	Daniel	Carlinhos Brown
3	Dudu Nobre	Di Ferrero	Luiza Possi	Rogério Flausino
3	MC Guimê	Mr. Catra	Guilherme Arantes	Luiz Caldas
3	—N/a		Pepeu Gomes	—N/a
4	Carlinhos Brown	Lulu Santo	Michel Teló	Claudia Leitte
4	Rogério Flausino	Luiza Possi	Di Ferrero	Alexandre Pires
4	David Bisbal	Daniel	Silva/ Don L	Daddy Yankee
5	Lulu Santos	Carlinhos Brown	Claudia Leitte	Michel Teló
5	Ivete Sangalo			
6	Carlinhos Brown	Michel Teló	Ivete Sangalo	Lulu Santos
6	Sandy	Chitãozinho & Xororó	—N/a	Tranqüilo Soundz
7	Carlinhos Brown	Michel Teló	Ivete Sangalo	Lulu Santos
7	Claudia Leitte			
7	Anitta			
7	Rael	—N/a	Melim	—N/a
8	Michel Teló	Ivete Sangalo	Iza	Lulu Santos
8	Paulo Ricardo; Daniel			
8	Bruno & Marrone	Maria Rita	Alcione	Gal Costa
12	Carlinhos Brown	Michel Teló	Iza	Lulu Santos
12	—N/a		Mumuzinho	—N/a
12	Fafá de Belém; Claudia Leitte; Daniel			
12	Gaby Amarantos; Toni Garrido			
13	Matheus & Kauan	Duda Beat	Péricles	Mumuzinho
13	Gustavo Mioto; Rod Melim; Lauana Prado; MC Daniel			
13	Tierry; Paulo Ricardo; Léo Foguete			
13	Toni Garrido; Priscilla; Fabi Bang			
14	Matheus & Kauan	Lauana Prado	Paulo Ricardo	Diogo Nogueira
14	Oxa	Jade Baraldo	WD	Will
14	Priscilla			
14	Saulo Vasconcelos			

=== Coaches' teams and their artists ===
- These are each of the coaches' teams throughout the seasons' live shows. Winners are in **bold** and finalists in italic.

Season	Coaches and contestants				
1	Team Lulu	Team Brown	Team Claudia	Team Daniel	—N/a
1	Maria Christina; Késia Estácio; Marquinho Osócio; Gabriel Levan; Lorena Lessa; Patricia Rezende	**Ellen Oléria**; Ludmillah Anjos; Mira Callado; Dani Morais; Quesia Luz; Rafah	Ju Moraes; Thalita Pertuzatti; Ana Rafaela; Bella Stone; Gustavo Fagundes; Nayra Costa	Liah Soares; Danilo Dyba; Júnior Meirelles; Alma Thomas; Carol Marques; Pedro Eduardo	—N/a
2					—N/a
2	Pedro Lima; Luana Camarah; Dom Paulinho Lima	Lucy Alves; Marcos Lessa; Rodrigo Castellani	**Sam Alves**; Gabby Moura; Khrystal; Rully Anne	Rubens Daniel; Cecília Militão; Marcela Bueno	—N/a
3					—N/a
3	**Danilo Reis & Rafael**; Nonô Lellis; Edu Camargo; Maria Alice	Romero Ribeiro; Rose Oliver; Joey Mattos; Paula Marchesini	Lui Medeiros; Leandro Buenno; Nise Palhares; Kall Medrado	Kim Lírio; Jésus Henrique; Vitor & Vanuti; Carla Casarim	—N/a
4	Team Brown	Team Teló	Team Lulu	Team Claudia	—N/a
4	Junior Lord; Paula Sanffer; Agnes Jamille; Rebeca Sauwen	**Renato Vianna**; Renan Ribeiro; Edu Santa Fé; Matteus	Ayrton Montarroyos; Joelma Santiago; Jonnata Lima; Tori Huang	Nikki; Brícia Helen; Allice Tirolla; Lorena Ly	—N/a
5	Afonso Cappelo; D'Lara; Brena Gonçalves	**Mylena Jardim**; Bruno Gadiol; Gabriel Correa	Dan Costa; Lumi; Gabriela Ferreira	Danilo Franco; Jade Baraldo; Alexey Martinez	—N/a
6	Team Brown	Team Teló	Team Ivete	Team Lulu	—N/a
6	Vinicius D'Black; Gab Ferreira	**Samantha Ayara**; Alysson & Adysson	Carol Biazin; Juliano Barreto	Day; Mariana Coelho	—N/a
7					—N/a
7	Erica Natuza; Murilo Bispo; David Nascimento; Kelvin Bruno	**Léo Pain**; Lais Yasmin; Dri; Morgana Rodrigues	Kevin Ndjana; Edson Carlos; Marine Lima; Flávia Gabê	Isa Guerra; Priscila Tossan; Arthur Henrique; Micaella Marinho	—N/a
8	Team Teló	Team Ivete	Team Iza	Team Lulu	—N/a
8	**Tony Gordon**; Mobi Colombo; Bia Ferraz; Tatila Krau	Willian Kessley; Ramon & Rafael; Rebeca Lindsay; Samara Alves	Ana Ruth; Edyelle Brandão; Alexa Marrie; Luana Berti	Lúcia Muniz; Pollyana Caires; EL1; Paula Araújo	—N/a
9	Team Brown	Team Teló	Team Iza	Team Lulu	—N/a
9	Izrra; Amanda Coronha; Carla Sceno; Cleane Sampaio	Douglas Ramalho; Glícia França; Larissa Vitorino; Manso	**Victor Alves**; Diva Menner; Luciana Ribeiro; Luli	Ana Canhoto; Dan Gentil; Ed Souza; Luana Granai	—N/a
10	Team Brown	Team Claudia	Team Teló	Team Iza	Team Lulu
10	Gustavo Matias; Nêgamanda; Lysa Ngaca; Ammora Alves; Cristiana de Paula; Serena	Bruno Fernandez; Danilo Moreno; Dielle Anjos; Wina; Ariane Zaine; Cibelle Hespanhol	**Giuliano Eriston**; Fernanda de Lima; EuLá; Nyah; Júlia Rezende; Thór Junior	Hugo Rafael; WD; Anna Júlia; Dona Preta; Criston Lucas; Luiza Dutra	Gustavo Boná; Júlia Paz; Carlos Filho; Thais Piza; Bruno Rodriguez; Léo Pinheiro
11	Team Teló	Team Iza	Team Gaby	Team Lulu	—N/a
11	**Keilla Júnia**; Duda & Isa Amorim; Makem	Bell Lins; Cesar Soares; Dgê	Mila Santana; Fellipe Dias; Nath Audizio	Juceir Jr; Brenda Hellen; Juniô Castanha	—N/a
12	Team Brown	Team Teló	Team Iza	Team Lulu	—N/a
12	Amanda Maria; Matu Miranda	Jhonny; Renan Zonta	Thais Ribeiro; Luana Camarah	**Ivan Barreto**; GUT	—N/a
13	Team Matheus & Kauan	Team Duda	Team Péricles	Team Mumu	—N/a
13	Jade Salles; André & Luiz Otávio; Raiza & Cris	Bell Éter; Lara Vieira; Natascha Falcão	Jamah; Thales Cesar; Hector.	**Thiago Garcia**; Gabriel Lima; Ellen Santos	—N/a
14	Team Matheus & Kauan	Team Lauana	Team Paulo	Team Diogo	—N/a

=== Line-up of coaches ===
Coaches' line-up by chairs order
Season	Year	Coaches				
Season	Year	1	2	3	4	C.S.
1	2012	Lulu	Brown	Claudia	Daniel	No fifth coach
2	2013	Lulu	Brown	Claudia	Daniel	No fifth coach
3	2014	Claudia	Lulu	Daniel	Brown	No fifth coach
4	2015	Brown	Teló	Lulu	Claudia	No fifth coach
5	2016	Lulu	Brown	Claudia	Teló	No fifth coach
6	2017	Brown	Teló	Ivete	Lulu	No fifth coach
7	2018	Brown	Teló	Ivete	Lulu	No fifth coach
8	2019	Teló	Ivete	Iza	Lulu	No fifth coach
9	2020	Brown	Teló	Iza	Lulu	No fifth coach
10	2021	Brown	Claudia	Iza	Lulu	Teló
11	2022	Teló	Iza	Gaby	Lulu	No fifth coach
12	2023	Brown	Teló	Iza	Lulu	No fifth coach
13	2025	Matheus & Kauan	Duda	Péricles	Mumu	No fifth coach
14	2026	Matheus & Kauan	Lauana	Paulo	Diogo	No fifth coach

== Hosts ==
Key
Main host
Backstage host

Host	Seasons													
Host	1	2	3	4	5	6	7	8	9	10	11	12	13	14
Tiago Leifert (Note: Leifert only hosted the Blind auditions on season 10, as he had to withdraw from the show for personal reasons. The Voice + host, Marques, took his place for the rest of the season.)														
Daniele Suzuki														
Miá Mello														
Fernanda Souza														
Mariana Rios														
Jeniffer Nascimento														
André Marques														
Fátima Bernardes														
Thaís Fersoza														
Gaby Cabrini														

== Series overview ==
The Voice Brasil series overview
Season	Aired	Winner	Runners-up				Winning coach	Hosts		Coaches (chairs' order)				
Season	Aired	Winner	Runners-up				Winning coach	Main	Backstage	1	2	3	4	5
1	2012	Ellen Oléria	Ju Moraes	Liah Soares	Maria Christina	No fifth finalist	Carlinhos Brown	Tiago Leifert	Daniele Suzuki	Lulu	Brown	Claudia	Daniel	None
2	2013	Sam Alves	Lucy Alves	Pedro Lima	Rubens Daniel	No fifth finalist	Claudia Leitte	Tiago Leifert	Miá Mello	Lulu	Brown	Claudia	Daniel	None
3	2014	Danilo & Rafael	Kim Lírio	Lui Medeiros	Romero Ribeiro	No fifth finalist	Lulu Santos	Tiago Leifert	Fernanda Souza	Claudia	Lulu	Daniel	Brown	None
4	2015	Renato Vianna	Ayrton Montarroyos	Junior Lord	Nikki	No fifth finalist	Michel Teló	Tiago Leifert	Daniele Suzuki	Brown	Teló	Lulu	Claudia	None
5	2016	Mylena Jardim	Afonso Cappelo	Dan Costa	Danilo Franco	No fifth finalist	Michel Teló	Tiago Leifert	Mariana Rios	Lulu	Brown	Claudia	Teló	None
6	2017	Samantha Ayara	Carol Biazin	Day	Vinicius D'Black	No fifth finalist	Michel Teló	Tiago Leifert	Mariana Rios	Brown	Teló	Ivete	Lulu	None
7	2018	Léo Pain	Erica Natuza	Isa Guerra	Kevin Ndjana	No fifth finalist	Michel Teló	Tiago Leifert	Mariana Rios	Brown	Teló	Ivete	Lulu	None
8	2019	Tony Gordon	Ana Ruth	Lúcia Muniz	Willian Kessley	No fifth finalist	Michel Teló	Tiago Leifert	Jeniffer Nascimento	Teló	Ivete	Iza	Lulu	None
9	2020	Victor Alves	Douglas Ramalho	Izrra	Ana Canhoto	No fifth finalist	Iza	Tiago Leifert	Jeniffer Nascimento	Brown	Teló	Iza	Lulu	None
10	2021	Giuliano Eriston	Gustavo Matias	Hugo Rafael	Bruno Fernandez	Gustavo Boná	Michel Teló	André Marques	Jeniffer Nascimento	Brown	Claudia	Teló	Iza	Lulu
11	2022	Keilla Júnia	Mila Santana	Bell Lins	Juceir Jr	No fifth finalist	Michel Teló	Fátima Bernardes	Thaís Fersoza	Teló	Iza	Gaby	Lulu	None
12	2023	Ivan Barreto	Thais Ribeiro	Amanda Maria	Jhonny	No fifth finalist	Lulu Santos	Fátima Bernardes		Brown	Teló	Iza	Lulu	None
13	2025	Thiago Garcia	Bell Éter	Jamah	Jade Salles	No fifth finalist	Mumuzinho	Tiago Leifert	Gaby Cabrini	Matheus & Kauan	Duda	Péricles	Mumu	None
14	2026	Current season				No fifth finalist	TBA	Tiago Leifert	Gaby Cabrini	Matheus & Kauan	Lauana	Paulo	Diogo	None

== Ratings and reception ==
Season	Timeslot (BRT)	Network	Premiered		Ended		TV season	SP viewers (in points)	Source
Season	Timeslot (BRT)	Network	Date	Viewers (in points)	Date	Viewers (in points)	TV season	SP viewers (in points)	Source
1	Sunday 02:30 p.m.	TV Globo	23 September 2012	15.5	16 December 2012	14.0	2012	14.62	
2	Thursday 10:30 p.m.	TV Globo	3 October 2013	24.3	26 December 2013	27.0	2013	25.78	
3	Thursday 10:30 p.m.	TV Globo	18 September 2014	21.1	25 December 2014	22.2	2014	22.15	
4	Thursday 10:30 p.m.	TV Globo	1 October 2015	20.2	25 December 2015	21.0	2015	20.25	
5	Thursday 10:30 p.m.	TV Globo	5 October 2016	22.9	29 December 2016	18.8	2016	21.57	
6	Thursday 10:30 p.m.	TV Globo	21 September 2017	25.2	21 December 2017	25.8	2017	23.44	
7	Tuesday 10:30 p.m. Thursday 10:30 p.m.	TV Globo	17 July 2018	22.0	27 September 2018	23.2	2018	23.65	
8	Tuesday 10:30 p.m. Thursday 10:30 p.m.	TV Globo	30 July 2019	24.6	3 October 2019	24.7	2019	25.09	
9	Tuesday 11:00 p.m. Thursday 11:00 p.m.	TV Globo	15 October 2020	16.9	17 December 2020	15.4	2020	16.17	
10	Tuesday 10:30 p.m. Thursday 10:30 p.m.	TV Globo	26 October 2021	18.5	23 December 2021	16.2	2021	15.87	
11	Tuesday 10:30 p.m. Thursday 10:30 p.m.	TV Globo	15 November 2022	15.1	29 December 2022	15.3	2022	15.13	
12	Tuesday 10:30 p.m. Thursday 10:30 p.m.	TV Globo	28 November 2023	14.8	28 December 2023	17.2	2023	16.63	
13	Monday 10:30 p.m	SBT; Disney +	6 October 2025	4.1	22 December 2025		2025		
14	Sunday 6:00 p.m	SBT; Disney +	27 september 2026	17.8	2026		2026		[60]

- Each point represents a specific number of households in São Paulo.
  - 2012: 60.000 households.
  - 2013: 62.000 households.
  - 2014: 65.000 households.
  - 2015: 67.000 households.
  - 2016: 69.000 households.
  - 2017: 70.500 households.
  - 2018: 71.855 households.
  - 2019: 73.015 households.
  - 2020: 74.987 households.
  - 2021: 76.577 households.
  - 2022: 74.666 households.
  - 2023: 76.953 households.
  - 2025: 77.488 households.
  - 2026:

== International broadcasting ==
Country / Region	Channel	Airing
Central America	TV Globo North America	23 September 2012
North America	TV Globo North America	23 September 2012
South America	TV Globo South America	23 September 2012
Africa	TV Globo Africa	30 September 2012
Asia	TV Globo Oceania	30 September 2012
Oceania	TV Globo Oceania	30 September 2012
Europe	TV Globo Europe	30 September 2012
Japan	TV Globo IPC	30 September 2012
Portugal	TV Globo Portugal	30 September 2012
