= Danni Suzuki =

Brazilian actress (born 1977)

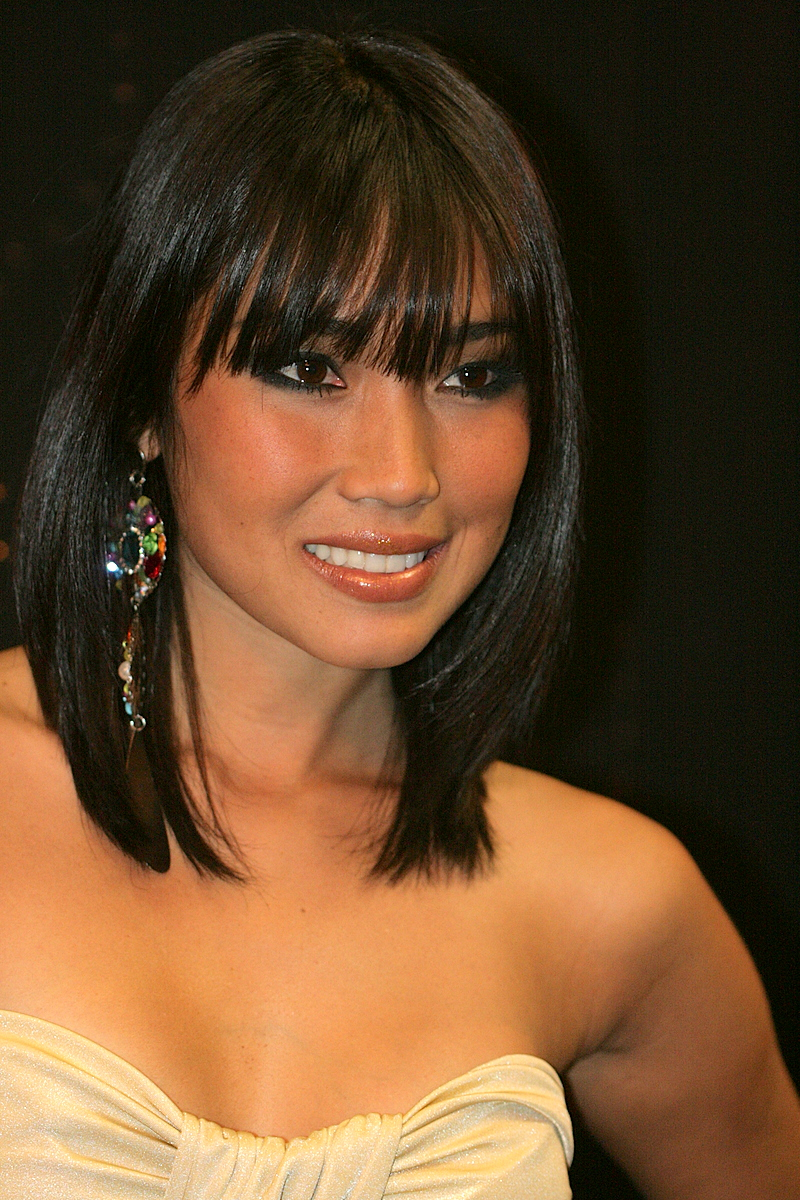
- Suzuki in 2008
- Born: 21 September 1977 (age 48); Rio de Janeiro, Brazil
- Education: Pontifical Catholic University of Rio de Janeiro
- Occupations: Actress; filmmaker; television host
- Years active: 1998–present
- Spouse: Fábio Novaes (m. 2011; div. 2013)
- Children: 1

Daniele Suzuki (Brazilian Portuguese: [dɐ̃niˈɛʎi suˈzuki]; born 21 September 1977) is a Brazilian actress, filmmaker, and television host.

== Biography ==
Born in Rio de Janeiro, Daniele Suzuki is the daughter of Hiroshi Suzuki, a second generation Japanese Brazilian from São Paulo, whose parents immigrated from Shizuoka. Her mother is Ivone Suzuki, a Brazilian from Minas Gerais, of German, Italian and Native Brazilian descent. Her father walked out on her family when she was 15 and moved back to São Paulo. Suzuki was raised in Rio de Janeiro by her mother and grandmother and faced financial difficulties; she had to live at her mother's friend home because her father sold the family house, leaving them with no options. Suzuki said about this period that she "didn't go angry because she always had supporting friends". Since then, she reportedly rarely sees her father.

== Career ==
When she was 15, Suzuki started her career as a model, despite finding that her Asian appearance somewhat limited her chances. She graduated in Industrial Design in Pontifical Catholic University of Rio de Janeiro. Later, she started acting, gaining fame as the Brazilian teenager Miyuki in the telenovela Malhação. Nowadays, Suzuki also works as a host in Pé no Chão show, on the Brazilian Multishow channel.

== Filmography ==
- 2020 – Arcanjo Renegado - Capitã Luciana Mayumi
- 2019 – Desjuntados - Patrícia
- 2017 – Um casal inseparável - Cristina
- 2016 – Baile de máscaras - Fernanda
- 2015 – Malhação Sonhos - Roberta
- 2012 – Cheias de Charme – Herself
- 2009 – Viver a Vida – Ellen
- 2008 – Ciranda de Pedra – Alice / Amélia
- 2006 – Pé na Jaca – Rosa Tanaka
- 2005 – Bang Bang – Yoko Bell
- 2004 – Malhação – Miyuki Shimahara
- 2003 – Malhação – Miyuki Shimahara
- 2003 – Sandy & Junior – Yoko
- 2000 – Uga-Uga – Sarah

Special

- 2010 – Diversão & Cia – Keila
- 2007 – Conexão Xuxa – Herself
- 2006 – Os Caras de Pau – Herself
- 2006 – Dança no Gelo – (reality show – Domingão do Faustão) (second place)

Host

- The Voice Brasil
- Pé no Chão
- Tribos
- Mandou Bem
- Demorô
- Destino Verão

=== Cinema ===
- 2024 – Kung Fu Panda 4 Zhen
- 2023 – Migration Chump | Lelê
- 2008 – O Guerreiro Didi e a Ninja Lili.... Yolanda
- 2000 – Sabor da Paixão
