= Matheus & Kauan =

Brazilian pop group

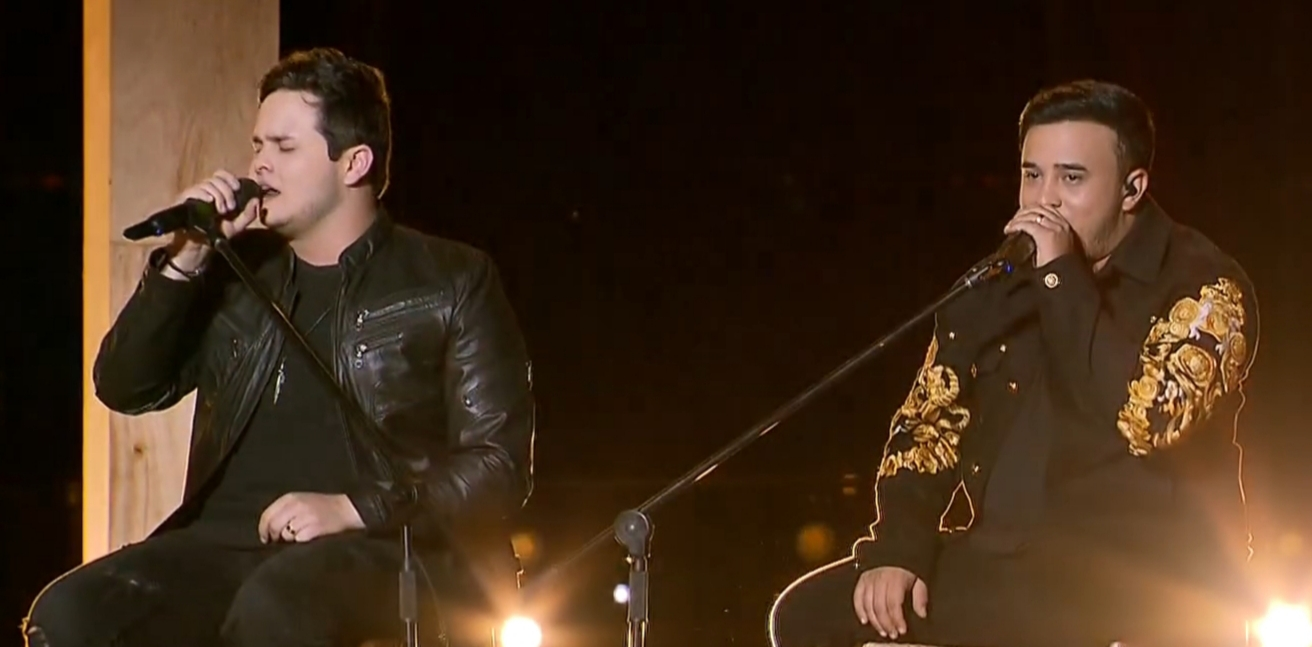
- Duo singers Brazilian Matheus & Kauan

Background information
- Origin: Itapuranga, Goiás
- Genres: Sertanejo universitário; Sertanejo
- Years active: 2010–present
- Labels: Audiomix; Universal Music
- Members: Matheus Aleixo Pinto Rosa; Osvaldo Pinto Rosa Filho
- Website: matheusekauan.com.br

Matheus & Kauan is a Brazilian musical duo consisting of brothers Matheus Aleixo Pinto Rosa (born October 4, 1994) and Osvaldo Pinto Rosa Filho (born December 7, 1988). They perform sertanejo and pop music. Since 2010, the duo has recorded original songs and written songs for other Brazilian musicians. They became prominent in 2015 when their version of the Paula Matto song "Que Sorte a Nossa" reached over 200 million views on YouTube.

The duo composes their own songs but often collaborates with other artists, including "Tudo que Você Quiser" with Luan Santana, "Se Tudo Fosse Fácil" with Michel Teló, and "Coisas de Quem Ama" covered by Jorge & Mateus. Their hit "Ao Vivo e a Cores" with Brazilian singer Anitta stayed at the top of the Spotify Brazil list for almost two months.

== History ==
Kauan began singing with his father at church in Itapuranga, Goiás (central Brazil). His mother took him to participate in contests. When Kauan was 10 years old, he released a CD of four Sertanejas songs which he had interpreted. At the age of 15, Kauan recorded another solo album. He visited the United States and returned to form a duo with his brother, Matheus, who at the time was singing and composing.

In 2012, the brothers released their first album Paraquedas. They funded the album's production by selling the family car. Their second album, Intensamente Hoje, was certified platinum. The brothers collaborated with the singer Anitta on the single "Ao Vivo e a Cores", which won a gold record award. The duo was nominated for the Multishow Brazilian Music Award in the experiment category, for the Internet trophy as best duo by the Brazilian TV channel SBT, and for the Nick Teen Choice Awards.

In 2020, their singles "Vou Ter Que Superar" and "Quarta Cadeira" were certified Triple Diamond in Brazil, along with "Mágica" and "Cerveja, Sal e Limão" being certified Diamond and their album Tem Moda Pra Tudo being certified Diamond.
