= Tiago Leifert =

Brazilian journalist and television presenter

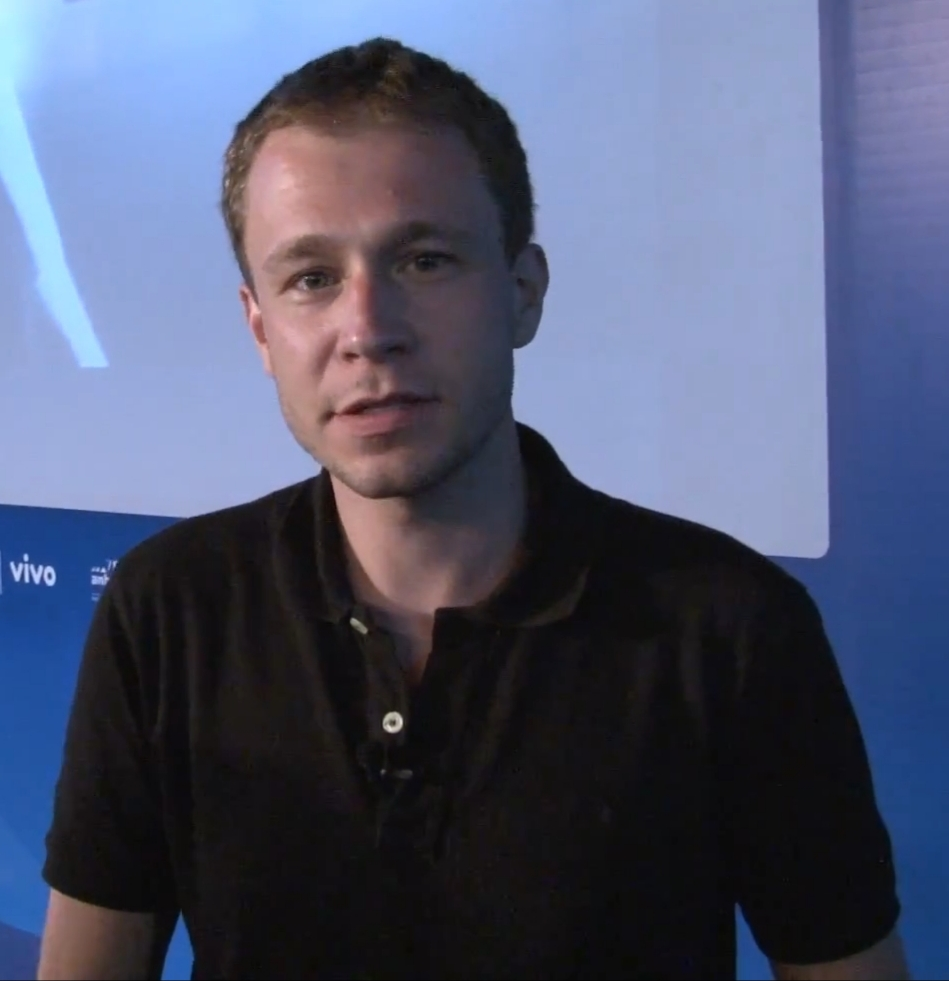
- Leifert in 2013
- Born: Tiago Rodrigues de Leifert; 22 May 1980 (age 46); São Paulo, Brazil
- Education: University of Miami
- Occupations: Journalist, television presenter
- Height: 1.76 m (5 ft 9 in)
- Spouse: Daiana Garbin (m. 2012)
- Children: 1

Tiago Rodrigues de Leifert (born 22 May 1980) is a Brazilian journalist and television presenter.

== Biography ==
Tiago was born in São Paulo, Brazil. He is the son of Gilberto Leifert, director of market relations for Rede Globo network. Tiago is of Jewish and Portuguese descent.

== Career ==
Leifert began his career as a reporter for the traditional "Desafio ao Galo", a program dedicated to amateur soccer. He majored in Journalism and Psychology from the University of Miami and was a trainee in Journalism from American network NBC. In 2004 he started working at TV Vanguarda, an affiliate of TV Globo in São José dos Campos, in the interior of São Paulo, where he was editor and presenter of Vanguarda Mix, the broadcaster's youth entertainment program. Leifert started working at Rede Globo presenting the Pro Rad in 2006 and videogame related stories for Esporte Espetacular. He covered the Brazilian football season in 2008, the 2007 Pan American Games in Rio de Janeiro and the 2008 Summer Olympics in Beijing.

In January 2009, he became the new editor-in-chief and presenter of Globo Esporte SP, when he introduced a new format, allowing the use of a teleprompter, the TP, a resource used by journalism to allow for the reading of the previously written text, to be dispensed with without looking away from the camera. The program's spontaneity, catchphrases and humorous frames became the program's trademarks, such as, for example, with the strikers Pedrão, from Grêmio Recreativo Barueri, now Grêmio Prudente, Nei Paraíba do Guarani and Val Baiano (whom he honored with a funk ao alive) of the Flamengo. At the invitation of the director Boninho, Tiago started to present The Voice Brasil on Globo since the first season (2012).

Leifert was the main commentator in the Brazilian version of the FIFA video game series from FIFA 13 to FIFA 20, alongside Caio Ribeiro. In July 2015, Leifert said goodbye to Globo Esporte SP after leaving journalism to start working in Globo's entertainment area. As her first job at Projac, she became an interim member of the team of presenters for the program Encontro com Fátima Bernardes during the presenter's vacation. In August 2015, he debuted as one of the hosts of the new show É de Casa, shown on Saturday mornings, under the direction of Boninho. Between January and March 2016, on Sundays, he presented the first season of The Voice Kids, a version of the reality show for children and young people from nine to fifteen years old. On August 27, his departure from É de Casa was announced to become the presenter of Big Brother Brasil from the 17th season, replacing Pedro Bial. It was also announced that Leifert would not headline The Voice Kids' second season, scheduled for January 2017, being replaced by André Marques. In 2016, he started to present the program Zero1, focusing on video games, culture, Geek, and the pop universe, under the direction of Alexandre Lannes and Eduardo Xocante, also from the Boninho nucleus. In 2017, he started to present the Big Brother Brazil. In 2021, after 16 years, Tiago left Globo. In January 2025, Tiago Leifert agreed to return to television and was hired as a sports commentator for SBT.

== Awards ==
Some awards won by the journalist: In 2009, "Revelation", awarded by the Association of sportswriters in the state of São Paulo (ACEESP); "Best of Broadcast Television Presenter" award by the São Paulo Association of Art Critics in 2010, 2011, 2012 and 2013, in 2010, the "Communicate Award Sports Journalist / Electronic Media". In 2011, Leifert won the "Best of the Year / Journalist" in Rede Globo's Domingão do Faustão, competing with Fátima Bernardes and William Bonner; award for "Best Presenter" award by the Sports Writers Association of the State of São Paulo (ACEESP) and "Featured Sports Journalist" Extra TV Award, sponsored by the newspaper Extra (RJ), by choice of the readers and netizens.
