= Bailey May =

Filipino-British actor and singer (born 2002)

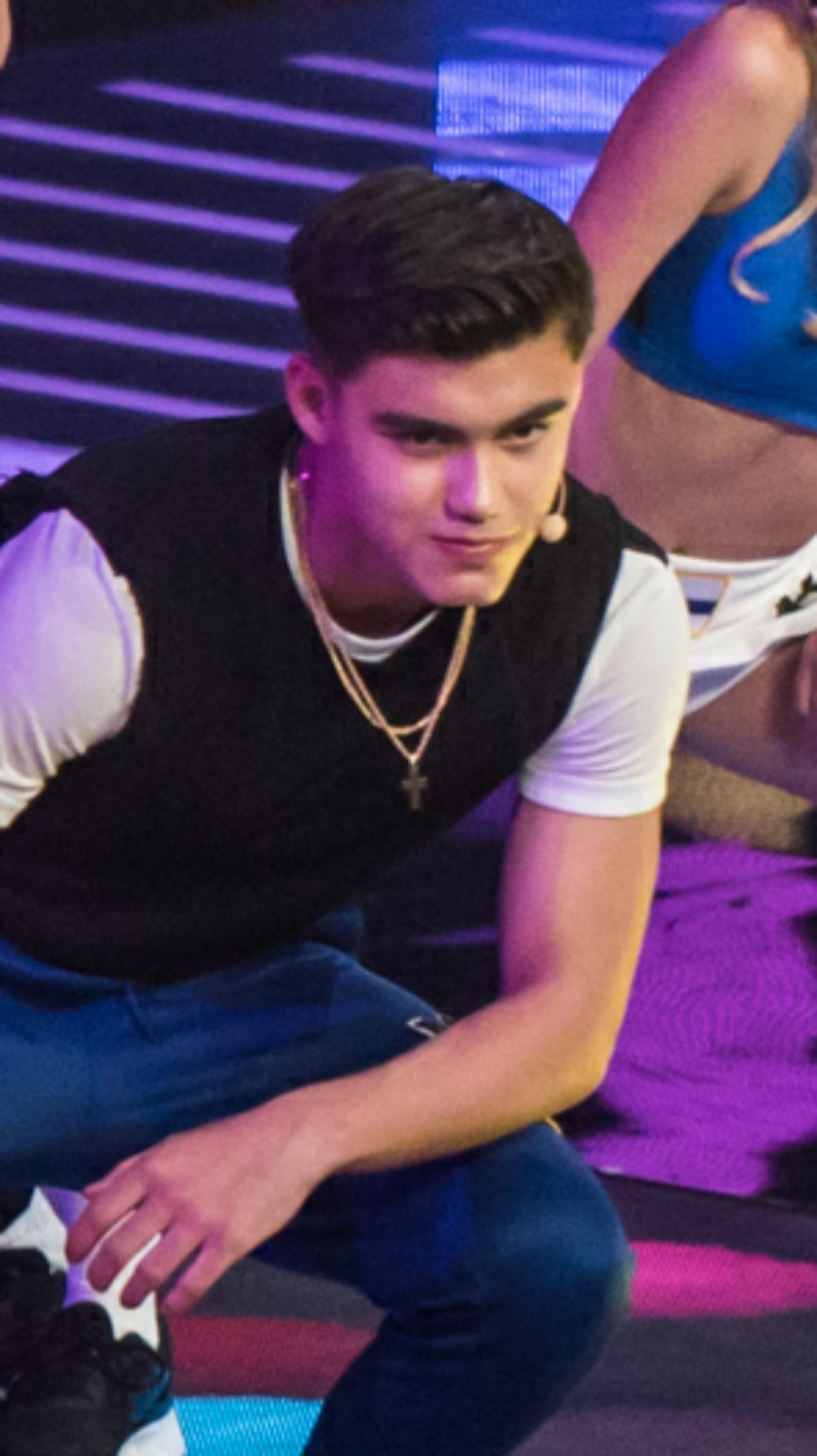
- May in 2018
- Born: Bailey Thomas Cabello May; 6 August 2002 (age 24); Cebu City, Cebu, Philippines
- Education: Notre Dame High School, Norwich
- Occupations: Actor; singer; model; dancer; songwriter
- Years active: 2015–present
- Agents: Star Magic (2015–2019); XIX Entertainment (2017–2023); Sparkle (2026–present)
- Musical career
- Genres: Pop; world; R&B; dance pop
- Instrument: Vocals
- Years active: 2015–present
- Labels: Star Music; AWAL; XIX Entertainment
- Formerly of: Now United
- Website: Bailey May on Instagram

Signature
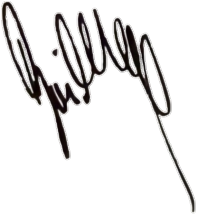

Bailey Thomas Cabello May (born 6 August 2002) is a Filipino and British singer, songwriter, model, actor, dancer and television personality. He first gained recognition through his Sean Kingston and Daniel Padilla covers. In 2015, he successfully auditioned for the 10th year edition of Pinoy Big Brother titled Pinoy Big Brother: 737, and eventually placed as the third runner-up (4th Teen Big Placer). In 2017, he joined the global pop group Now United, representing the Philippines, but left the group in 2023 to pursue his solo career.

== Early life and education ==
Bailey Thomas Cabello May was born on August 6, 2002 in Cebu City, Cebu, Philippines to a Cebuana mother, Vanessa May (née Cabello), and a British father, Matthew May who works for Serco as an escort custody officer, and is a worship leader at Soul Church, Norwich. He has a younger sister named Maya Luiza May. When he was four, his family moved from the Philippines to Norwich, England where he lived until he was twelve. As a result, he holds dual Filipino and British citizenship. His family often returned to the Philippines for holidays and special family gatherings. He attended Notre Dame High School in Norwich.

At the age of twelve, May returned permanently to the Philippines, and later became an official housemate after auditioning online for Pinoy Big Brother: 737.

== Acting career ==
May auditioned as a housemate for Pinoy Big Brother: 737 and successfully entered in 2015. He won as third runner-up (4th Teen Big Placer).

His Pinoy Big Brother appearance paved the way for his entrance into Philippine showbiz landing him his first acting stint in the primetime hit On the Wings of Love playing the role of Harry Fausto the younger cousin of Clark Medina played by James Reid and the love interest of Audrey Olivar played by Ylona Garcia.

== Music career ==
=== 2015–2016: Music career beginnings ===
In July 2015, May, together with fellow housemate Ylona Garcia, recorded their own version of "Magmahal Muli" (Lit. To Love Again). The next month, he recorded his own version of "Now We're Together" which was originally sung by Khalil Ramos. On 9 August 2015 both songs were released on Spotify. His self-titled debut EP Bailey May was released in November 2015.

=== 2017–2023: Now United ===
In November 2017, May was revealed as part of the final lineup for the global pop group Now United, representing the Philippines, being announced as the 9th member. The group has since embarked on three world tours, Promo World Tour (2018), World Tour 2019 - Presented by YouTube Music, and Dreams Come True Tour (2019), traveling to various cities in countries such as Mexico, India, Brazil, South Korea, the Philippines, and the United States. In 2019, the music video for 'Afraid Of Letting Go' was released by Now United, where May stands out and the lead singer in the song, and where it is shot in Intramuros and some premises in Letran in Manila, Philippines. Also in 2019, Now United released 'Sundin Ang Puso' together with Pepsi, where May sang the chorus in Tagalog with Any Gabrielly, and it was also shot in Manila.

In January 2020, Now United released 'Live This Moment', which includes the boys of the group along with May in the music video. Also in 2020, the song and music video for 'Nobody Fools Me Twice' was released, with May's vocals provided in Korean, along with Heyoon Jeong. At the beginning of 2021, the group released the single 'How Far We've Come' wherein he's the only male vocalist who sang the song. At the beginning of April 2021, May didn't participate in the music videos of 'Show You How To Love' which was filmed in Malibu, California, the live version of 'Let The Music Move You' and 'Nobody Like Us' in Hawaii due to the comeback of its fellow member Lamar Morris. On January 13, 2023, he announced his departure from the group to pursue his solo career. On January 14, Odo was released. This song is the last song with Bailey as a member of Now United.

=== 2023-present: Solo career ===
On August 9, 2023, a few days after his birthday, American choreographer, Matt Stefanina released Reason Why featuring Bailey. The music video, which was released on August 29, featured his fellow Now United member, Sofya Plotnikoya.

On October 18, 2024, Bailey released "Come Closer".

== Filmography ==
=== Television ===
Year	Title	Role	Type of role
2015	Pinoy Big Brother: 737	Himself / housemate	Contestant
2015	Trending: Love	Zach Rodriguez	Co-lead role
2015–2026	ASAP	Himself	Guest / performer
2015	It's Showtime	Himself	Guest / performer
2015–2016	On the Wings of Love	Harry Fausto	Extended cast
2016	Myx	Himself	Celebrity VJ
2016	We Love OPM: The Celebrity Sing-Offs	Himself (Voice Next Door)	Contestant
2017	Maalaala Mo Kaya: Autograph	Daniel Padilla	Cast episode
2022–2023	Dream Maker: Search for the Next Global Pop Group	Himself	Mentor
2024	It's Showtime	Himself	Guest / performer

=== Documentaries ===
Year	Title	Character	Notes	Reference
2018	Meet Bailey	Himself	Frame on the Now United YouTube channel, where he talks about his whole life story until he became a member of the group	
2018	Dreams Come True: The Documentary	Himself	Documentary showing the creation of the global pop group Now United	

== Discography ==
=== Extended plays ===
List of EPs and selected details
Title	Details
Bailey May	Released: November 27, 2015; Label: Star Music; Formats: Digital download, streaming

=== Singles ===
==== As lead artist ====
List of singles as lead artist, showing year released, with selected chart positions and album name
Title	Year	Peaks	Album
Title	Year	PHL	Album
"Gusto Kita"	2016	*	Bailey May
"O Pag-ibig" (with Ylona Garcia)	2016	*	Himig Handog P-Pop Love Songs (2016)
"Can You Be My Girl"	2016	*	Bailey May
"Boom Goes My Heart"	2017	*	Bailey May
"Come Closer"	2024	—	TBA
"—" denotes releases that did not chart or were not released in that territory. "*" denotes the chart did not exist at that time.

==== As featured artist ====
List of singles as featured artist, showing year released, with selected chart positions and album name
Title	Year	Peak	Album
Title	Year	PHL	Album
"Reason Why" (Matt Steffanina featuring Bailey May)	2023	—	Non-album single
"—" denotes releases that did not chart or were not released in that territory.

==== Guest appearances ====
List of other appearances, showing year released, other artist(s) credited and album name
Title	Year	Other artist(s)	Album
"Magmahal Muli"	2015	Ylona Garcia	Pinoy Big Brother 737

== Awards and nominations ==
Year	Film Awards/Critics	Award	Nominated work	Result
2015	Pinoy Big Brother: 737	4th Teen Big Placer	—N/a	Finalist
2015	Star Cinema Awards	Favorite TV Loveteam with Ylona Garcia	—N/a	Nominated
2015	ASAP Pop Viewers' Choice Awards	Pop Teen Heartthrob	—N/a	Nominated
2015	ASAP Pop Viewers' Choice Awards	Pop Teen Loveteam with Ylona Garcia	—N/a	Nominated
2015	RAWR Awards	Male Breakthrough Artist of the Year	—N/a	Won
2015	29th PMPC Star Awards for Television	Male Celebrity of the Night	—N/a	Won
2016	Himig Handog PPop Lovesong	MYX Best Music Video with Ylona Garcia	"O Pag-ibig" with Ylona Garcia	Won
2016	Himig Handog PPop Lovesong	One Music PH's Favorite Interpreter with Ylona Garcia	"O Pag-ibig" with Ylona Garcia	Won
2016	Himig Handog PPop Lovesong	MOR Choice Awards with Ylona Garcia	"O Pag-ibig" with Ylona Garcia	Won
2016	Himig Handog PPop Lovesong	TFC Global Choice Award with Ylona Garcia	"O Pag-ibig" with Ylona Garcia	Won
2016	Push Awards	Push Like Newcomer	—N/a	Won
2016	Yes! Magazine	Most Beautiful Stars (Love Team Category) with Ylona Garcia	—N/a	Included
2016	8th PMPC Star Awards for Music	Best New Male Recording Artist of the Year	—N/a	Nominated
2016	8th PMPC Star Awards for Music	Song of the Year	"Gusto Kita"	Nominated
2016	8th PMPC Star Awards for Music	Dance Album of the Year	Bailey	Nominated
2016	30th PMPC Star Awards for Television	Best New Male TV Personality	On the Wings of Love	Nominated
2016	ASAP Pop Viewers' Choice Awards	Pop Male Hottie	—N/a	Nominated
2017	Wish 107.9 Awards	Wish Young Artist of the Year	—N/a	Nominated
2017	12th Myx Music Awards	Favorite Music Video with Ylona Garcia	"O Pag-ibig" with Ylona Garcia	Nominated
2017	12th Myx Music Awards	Favorite Song with Ylona Garcia	"O Pag-ibig" with Ylona Garcia	Nominated
2017	12th Myx Music Awards	Favorite Myx Celeb VJ with Ylona Garcia	—N/a	Nominated
2017	48th GMMSF Box-Office Entertainment Awards	Most Promising Male Singer/Performer of the Year	Bailey	Won
2017	MOR Choice Awards	Song of the Year	"O Pag-ibig" with Ylona Garcia	Won
2017	30th Awit Awards	Best Pop Recording	"O Pag-ibig" with Ylona Garcia	Won
2017	30th Awit Awards	Best Engineered Recording	"O Pag-ibig" with Ylona Garcia	Nominated
2017	30th Awit Awards	Song of the Year	"O Pag-ibig" with Ylona Garcia	Nominated
