= Notre Dame High School, Norwich =

Sixth form and secondary school in Norwich, England

Notre Dame High School and Sixth Form College

Location
- Surrey Street; Norwich, Norfolk, NR1 3PB; England
- 52°37′22″N 1°17′48″E

Information
- Other name: NDHS
- Type: Academy
- Motto: Ah! Qu'il est bon, le bon Dieu! (How good is the good God!)
- Religious affiliation: Roman Catholic
- Established: 1864; 162 years ago
- Founder: Sisters of Notre Dame de Namur
- Local authority: Norfolk County Council
- Oversight: Roman Catholic Diocese of East Anglia
- Trust: St John the Baptist Catholic MAT
- Department for Education URN: 137913 Tables
- Ofsted: Reports
- Headmaster: Tom Pinnington
- Chaplain: Alex Savage
- Gender: Mixed
- Age range: 11-18
- Enrolment: 1,396
- Houses: Rome; Santiago; Walsingham; Jerusalem
- Colours: <r>Yellow, Green, Blue, Red
- Alumni: Old Notre Damians
- Website: www.ndhs.org.uk

Notre Dame High School (NDHS) is a Roman Catholic secondary school and sixth form with academy status in Norwich, Norfolk, England, United Kingdom. The school opened in 1864 the Roman Catholic Diocese of East Anglia, Norfolk County Council, and the Department for Education all support the school.

== History ==
In 1889 a new wing was built to accommodate around 70 boarding pupils, and in 1915 what is now Franchise House with adjoining land on Surrey Street, was purchased. On this land the present main building was erected and opened in 1926 when there were 238 girl pupils. A year later, the school became recognised by the Ministry of Education. In 1939 additional buildings became available for the dining hall and domestic science and in 1973 the Lady Julian Building, which had formerly housed its prep department, became part of Notre Dame High School. The prep department later became separate and is now an independent school.

A major development in the school took place on 1 September 1979 when ownership of the school was transferred from the Sisters of Notre Dame de Namur to the Diocese of East Anglia, and the school's status changed from girls' direct grant grammar school to a voluntary aided mixed comprehensive school.

Since 1980, the St Peter's Building (Science & Technology completed in 1994), the St Paul's Building (Sports Hall, 1985), the St Julie's Building (Reception and Administration, 1996) and St Catherine's Building (Modern Languages, 1996) have been acquired and modernised. In 1995 the Lady Julian Building (Library, Careers, History and Sixth Form Centre) was refurbished. In 2006, the St Paul's building was extensively refurbished, providing a Drama Studio and four new classrooms for Religious Education. This allowed the old Chapel, up until then used as a Drama studio, to be refurbished and turned back into a chapel. The new St Mary's building was completed by the end of October 2006, and houses a Sixth Form centre, a cafeteria, a library and extensive language classrooms. The St Catherine's building will then be used for staff training. The old St Mary's building, formerly the cafeteria, was demolished. The school has purchased a plot of land, once belonging to Norwich Union, for use as a playground for pupils.

Mr John Pinnington became the first lay headmaster of the school in January 1997, as successor of Sister Mary Cluderay. The school was awarded specialist school status for Languages in September 2000.

The school also has a new teacher training building. Ed Balls, the former Education Secretary, visited the school on 19 December 2008. Following a long internal and public consultation, it was decided that the school would acquire Academy status on 1 March 2012.

== Old Notre Damians ==
- Jack Bannon - English actor
- Margaret Beckett – MP for Derby South and former Secretary of State for Foreign and Commonwealth Affairs
- Tanya Burr – YouTube vlogger
- Jim Chapman – YouTube vlogger
- John Emms – chess Grandmaster
- Myleene Klass – Classical pianist, broadcaster and former member of the pop group Hear'Say
- Bailey May – Filipino-British singer and actor; Now United member
- Munya Chawawa - British-Zimbabwean comedian and Internet personality
- Anna Perrott - BBC Radio Norfolk presenter
- Ronan Sully - BBC Radio Leeds presenter
