= Savannah Clarke =

Australian singer, actress, musician and model

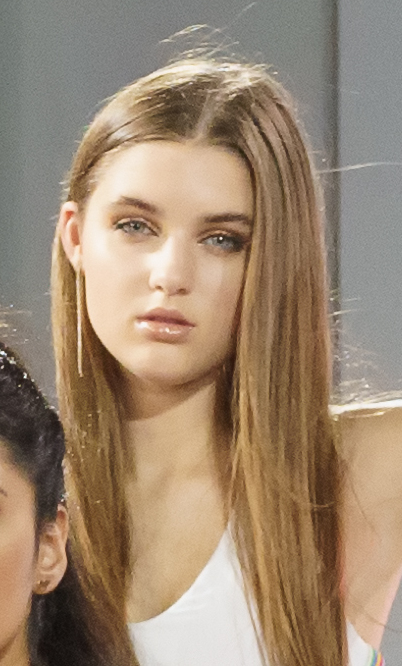
- Savannah Clarke in 2021
- Born: 9 July 2003 (age 23); Sydney, New South Wales, Australia
- Occupations: Singer; Songwriter; Actor; Dancer; Model; Musician
- Years active: 2019–present
- Agent(s): XIX Entertainment (2020–present), Platinum Management (Seoul, South Korea), BMEG Talent Management
- Musical career
- Genre: Pop
- Labels: XIX Entertainment; AWAL
- Member of: Now United

Savannah Clarke (born 9 July 2003) is an Australian singer, actor, dancer, and model. She is best known as an original member of the global pop group Now United. As a member of the group, Clarke received three Nickelodeon Kids' Choice Awards. In 2025, she was named to Forbes 30 Under 30 Australia.

Prior to joining Now United, Clarke worked in commercials, modelling, and musical theatre, including The Sound of Music. She later modelled in South Korea for three months.

In 2023, Clarke released her debut solo single, Bad Things.

== Awards and recognition ==
- Forbes 30 Under 30 Australia (2025)
- Nickelodeon Kids' Choice Awards, winning the Aussie/Kiwi Legend of the Year award for three consecutive years (2021, 2022, 2023).

== Biography ==
Clarke was born on 9 July 2003 in Sydney, Australia. She began training in music and dance at an early age, later learning to play the piano. She started her career appearing in commercials and working as a model.

She also performed in musical theatre, including The Sound of Music. Clarke later worked as a model in South Korea for three months.

In 2023, she released her debut solo single, Bad Things.

== Career ==
In 2019, Simon Fuller began searching for an additional member for Now United, with Australia selected as the country to be represented. Clarke was recruited into the group and, in February 2020, she met the group members in person.

Clarke was officially introduced as the Australian representative to the group on 28 February 2020. Her first music video with the group was "Come Together", which was released in March 2020. The group's first single with Clarke was "By My Side".

== Discography ==
=== As lead artist ===
List of singles as lead artist, showing year released and album name
Title	Year	Album
"Avalanche"	2022	Non-album single
"Bad Things"	2023	Non-album single

== Filmography ==
=== Film ===
Year	Title	Role	Notes
2019	The Light Beyond the Trees	Tash	Short film
2021	Love, Love, Love	Herself	Musical film / Now United project
2023	The Musical: Welcome to the Night of Your Life	Aster	Musical film
2023	Now United: Welcome to the Night of Your Life	Actress	Documentary / behind-the-scenes special

=== Documentaries ===
Year	Title	Role	Notes
2020	Meet Savannah	Herself	Documentary-style profile video released on Now United's YouTube channel.
2023	Now United: Welcome to the Night of Your Life	Herself	Behind-the-scenes documentary special.

== Awards and nominations ==
Year	Award	Category	Nominee	Result	Ref.
2021	2021 Kids' Choice Awards	Favorite Global Music Star	Savannah Clarke	Nominated	
2021	2021 Kids' Choice Awards	Aussie/Kiwi Legend of the Year	Savannah Clarke	Won	
2022	2022 Kids' Choice Awards	Aussie/Kiwi Legend of the Year	Savannah Clarke	Won	
2023	2023 Kids' Choice Awards	Aussie/Kiwi Legend of the Year	Savannah Clarke	Won	
2025	Forbes 30 Under 30 Australia	Entertainment	Savannah Clarke	Included	
