= Diarra Sylla =

French singer, dancer and model (born 2001)

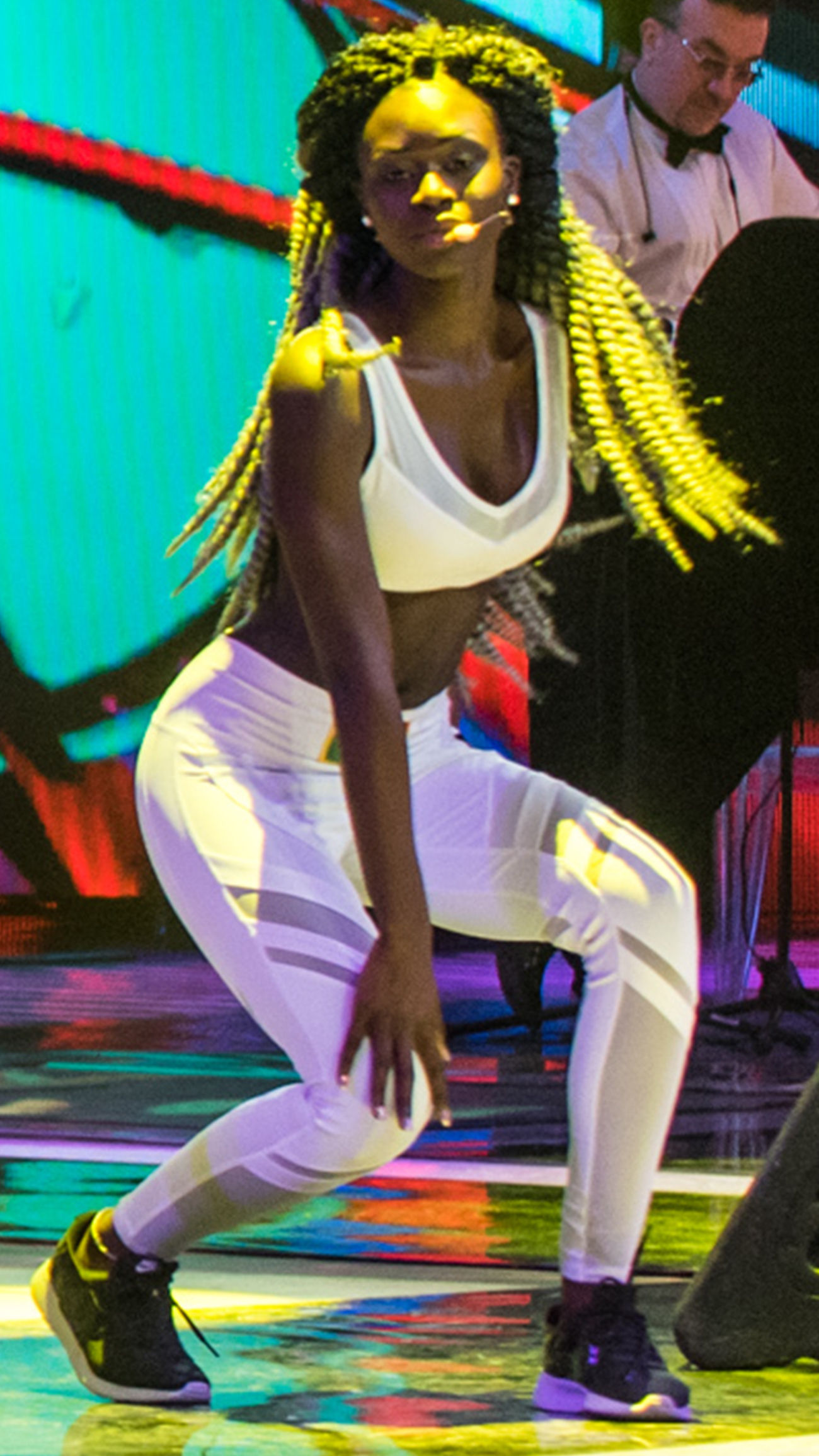
- Born: 30 January 2001 (age 25); Paris, France
- Other name: De-arra Sylla Diongue
- Citizenship: France; Senegal
- Occupations: Singer; dancer; model
- Years active: 2015–present
- Musical career
- Genres: Pop; R&B; afropop; afrobeat
- Years active: 2015–present
- Labels: XIX Entertainment (2017–2020); Syft / The Bad Guys (2021); Loki Artist Group (2022); Uncut Music Group (2022–2023); Cavviar Records (2024–present)

De-arra Sylla Diongue, more commonly known as Diarra Sylla (born 30 January 2001), is a French-Senegalese singer, dancer and model. She was part of the global pop group Now United, representing Senegal, and left the group in 2020 to pursue her solo career.

== Biography ==
Sylla was born in Paris, France, but later moved to Dakar, Senegal, where she grew up. She is estranged from her biological father, and has only met him a handful of times. During her childhood, she mainly lived with her cousin, as her mother frequently travelled. After performing onstage when she was six years old, she decided that her ultimate goal was to become a singer.

Sylla speaks three languages fluently: French, Wolof and English; she also speaks Turkish, but not fluently.

== Career ==
=== 2015–2016: Sen P'tit Gallé ===
After four years of discouraging her to pursue music, her mother finally allowed her to participate in the 2016 Sen P'tit Gallé, one of the most prominent singing competitions in Africa. She won first place and gained instant recognition.

=== 2017–2020: Now United ===
Sylla first heard about Now United through her sister and encouraged her to audition. After her successful audition, she was revealed as part of Now United's final lineup on 12 November 2017, being the group's only representative from Africa.

In March 2020, Sylla announced that she was preparing her solo career.

On 5 September 2020, she confirmed in a Hollywood Fix interview in Los Angeles that she had officially departed from the group to pursue solo endeavors. However, even after announcing her departure from the group, she appeared and even sang in some clips of the group, such as "Pas Le Choix", "Hewale" and "All Around The World".

=== 2021–present: Solo career ===
On 25 February 2021, Sylla released "Set Free", the debut song of her solo career.

On 12 March 2021, Bruno Martini, Luísa Sonza and Sylla released "Ain't Worried".

On 15 September 2021, Sylla and Marieme released "Catch a Vibe".

On 1 April 2022, Sylla and JayUncut released "Contagious".

On 19 August 2022, Rax and Sylla released "If I".

On 22 September 2022, Sylla and JayUncut released "Runaway".

On 4 November 2022, Sylla and JayUncut released "Comment Vas La Vie".

On 21 July 2023, Tones and I, Bia and Sylla released "Bring It On", the official song of the 2023 FIFA Women's World Cup.

On 10 January 2024, Sylla released "On It".

On 14 February 2024, Sylla released "Cupid".

On 4 October 2024, Sylla and Dior Mbaye released "La Famille Au Senegal Oui".

On 1 November 2024, Sylla and Mc Soffia released "Summer Love".

On 14 November 2024, Mason & Julez and Sylla released "Walked Away".

== Discography ==
=== As lead artist ===
List of singles as lead artist, with selected chart positions, showing year released
Title	Year	Peaks	Album
Title	Year	FRA	Album
"Set Free"	2021	—	Non-album single
"Ain't Worried" (with Bruno Martini and Luísa Sonza)	2021	—	Original
"Catch a Vibe" (with Marieme)	2021	—	Non-album singles
"Contagious" (with JayUncut)	2022	—	Non-album singles
"If I" (with Rax)	2022	—	Non-album singles
"Runaway" (with JayUncut)	2022	—	Non-album singles
"Comment Vas La Vie" (with JayUncut)	2022	—	Non-album singles
"Bring It On" (with Tones and I and Bia)	2023	—	Non-album singles
"On It"	2024	—	TBA
"Cupid"	2024	—	TBA
"La Famille Au Senegal Oui" (with Dior Mbaye)	2024	—	TBA
"Summer Love" (with Mc Soffia)	2024	—	TBA
"Walked Away" (with Mason & Julez)	2024	—	TBA
"—" denotes a recording that did not chart or was not released in that territory.

== Influence ==
Sylla is the most followed Senegalese woman on Instagram, with over 3 million followers on the social network.

She was featured on the cover and featured as a global icon of the North American magazine Bloom Xo, in June 2021.

Appeared on the cover of and was featured in the North American Grind Pretty Magazine, in the December/Winter 2021.

== Filmography ==
Year	Title	Grade(s)	Ref.
2016	Sen P'tit Gallé	Participant (1st Place)	

=== Documentaries ===
Year	Title	Character	Notes	Reference
2018	Meet Diarra	Herself	Frame on Now United's YouTube channel, where she talks about her entire life story until she reaches the group	
2018	Dreams Come True: The Documentary	Herself	Documentary showing the creation of the global pop group Now United	

In July 2021, Sylla appeared I one of the episodes of the documentary Trace Trends, which deals with Afro-urban culture.

In September 2021, Sylla made a special appearance on the WebSerie on the YouTube platform of the channel "ElhadjTV".

== Awards and nominations ==
Year	Awards	Category	Nominated	Result	Ref.
2020	You Pop Awards	Cat of the Year	Diarra Sylla	Nominated	
