= Krystian Wang =

Chinese singer (born 2000)

Krystian Wang 王南钧
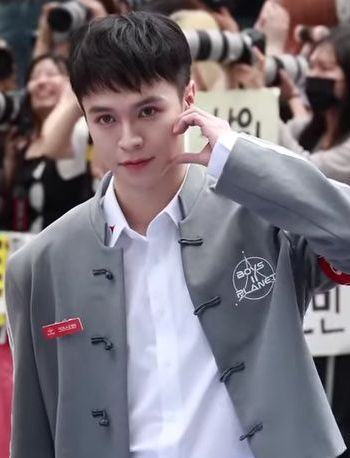
- Wang in June 2025

Background information
- Born: Wang Nanjun; 22 January 2000 (age 26); Beijing, China
- Origin: Chinese
- Genres: Pop; Mandopop
- Occupations: Singer; songwriter; dancer; model
- Instruments: Vocals
- Years active: 2017–present
- Labels: XIX Entertainment (2017–2020); BG Entertainment (2020–2023); TME (2023–present)
- Formerly of: Now United

Signature
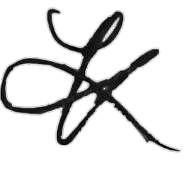

Wang Nanjun (Chinese: 王南钧; born January 22, 2000), known professionally as Krystian Wang, and also known mononymously as Krystian, is a Chinese singer, songwriter, dancer and model. He is best known as a member of the global pop group Now United, representing China, but is currently on hiatus. He was a contestant on Youth With You 3, and participated in the Chinese reality shows Super Boy. He also participated in the Korean reality show Boys Planet, in which he ranked 45th.

== Biography ==
Wang was born into a performing arts family in Beijing, China. His father is a military actor, and his mother is a model and theater actress. As a teenager, aged 15, Wang went to study alone in New York.

== Career ==
=== 2017–2021: Super Boy, Now United and Youth With You 3 ===
In 2017, Wang participated in an edition of the Chinese reality show Super Boy, where he came 7th place. He performed singing songs like "Gasoline", "Body Electric" and "All Around the World".

On 17 November, Wang was revealed as one of the members of Now United, being the twelfth until then. In December of the same year, the group released their first single, "Summer In The City". Among Now United's original songs, Wang's main musical solos are: "How We Do It" featuring Badshah, "Live This Moment" and "Chained Up".

On 22 October 2020, his participation in the 3rd season of the Chinese reality show Youth With You 3 was confirmed. Wang performed on the reality singing solo songs and in groups with striking choreography and costumes.

In February and April 2021, Wang performed on the program for the first time his authorial songs called "Inverse" and "yAo".

On 9 May, the official team (iQIYI) of Youth With You 3 confirmed the temporary cancellation of the season days before the final after controversies. With that, no group will be launched. According to the streaming platform, all voting for the contest has ended and the program will "review its rules". On 25 July 2021, at ChengDu Music Festival the top 9 of Youth With You season 3 were announced as a group called IXFORM. Wang was not part of the group, which means he did not make the top 9 on Youth With You season 3.

=== 2022–present: Solo career and Boys Planet ===
On 10 January 2022, Wang released his solo debut eponymous EP Krystian with two songs, "Divo" and "Lucifer".

On 28 November 2022, his participation in the Korean reality competition show Boys Planet was confirmed.

On 23 March 2023, he was eliminated from Boys Planet with a final ranking of 45th.

On 25 December 2023, Wang released his new single 喂 Serve.

== Filmography ==
=== Television shows ===
Year	Title	Grades	Ref.
2017	Super Boy	Participant (7th place)	
2020	618 Super Fight Night	Musical Attraction	
2020	The Irresistible	Episode 5 (participant)	
2020	The Wonderful Life	Musical Attraction	
2021	Youth With You 3	Participant (finalist)	
2023	Boys Planet	Participant (45th place)	
2025	Boys II Planet	Participant (Planet C - 33th place)	

=== Documentaries ===
Year	Title	Character	Notes	Reference
2018	Meet Krystian	Himself	Frame on the Now United YouTube channel, where he talks about the whole life story until he reaches the group	
2018	Dreams Come True: The Documentary	Himself	Documentary showing the creation of the global pop group Now United	

== Discography ==
=== Extended plays ===
Title	Details
Krystian	Released: 10 January 2022; Label: BG Entertainment; Formats: Digital download, streaming

=== Singles ===
==== As lead artist ====
List of singles as lead artist, showing year released, with selected chart positions and album name
Title	Year	Peaks	Album
Title	Year	CHN	Album
"Divo"	2022	—	Krystian
"Lucifer"	2022	—	Krystian
"喂 Serve"	2023	—	TBA
"—" denotes a recording that did not chart or was not released in that territory.

==== As featured artist ====
List of singles as featured artist, showing year released, with selected chart positions and album name
Title	Year	Peak chart positions	Album
Title	Year	KOR	Album
"Here I Am" (난 빛나) (as part of Boys Planet cast)	2023	— (Note: "Here I Am" did not enter the Circle Digital Chart, but appeared at number 199 on the component Download chart.)	Non-album single
"—" denotes releases that did not chart or were not released in that territory.
