= Nour Ardakani =

Lebanese singer, dancer and model (Born: 2001)

- نور عصام أردكاني
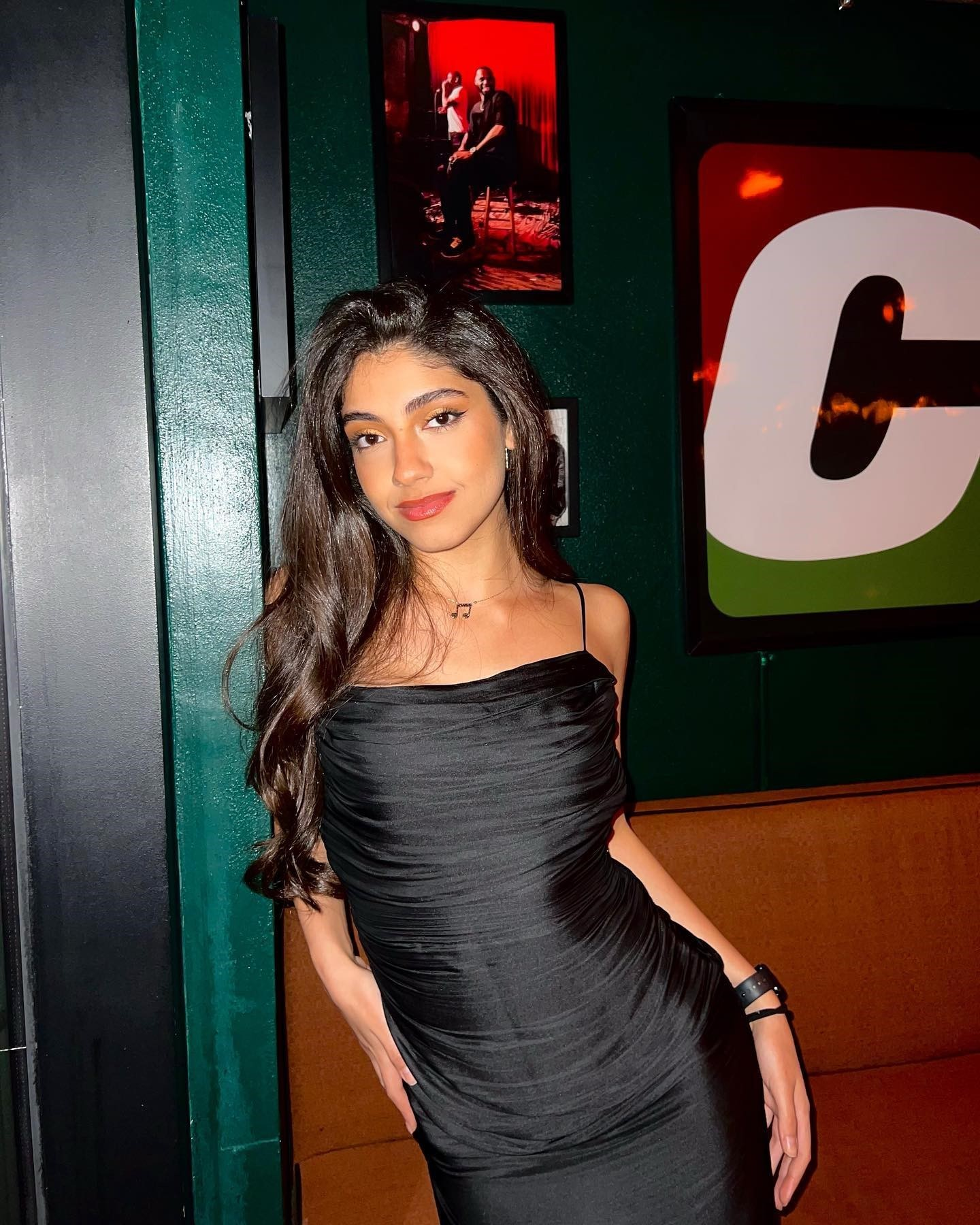
- Ardakani in 2022
- Born: Nour Issam Ardakani; 30 November 2001 (age 24); Beirut, Lebanon
- Citizenship: Lebanon
- Occupations: Singer; dancer; model
- Parent(s): Rana Ardakani (رنا أردكاني in Arabic) and Issam Ardakani (عصام أردكاني in Arabic)
- Relatives: Jad Issam Ardakani (جاد عصام أردكاني in Arabic) and Ryan Issam Ardakani (ريان عصام أردكاني in Arabic)
- Musical career
- Instruments: Vocals; piano; ukulêle
- Years active: 2020–present
- Labels: XIX Entertainment; AWAL
- Member of: Now United

Signature
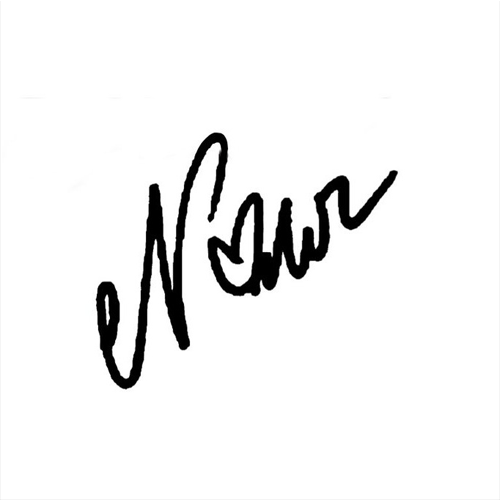

Nour Issam Ardakani (Arabic: نور عصام أردكاني; born November 30, 2001) is a Lebanese singer, dancer and model. She represented Lebanon and the MENA region in Now United, a global pop group founded by Spice Girls manager Simon Fuller. She left the band in September 2026 to pursue a solo career.

== Career ==
=== 2020–present: Now United ===
She was announced as the 16th member of the global pop group Now United on 21 September 2020 as Lebanon's representative, participated in the group's auditions and competed as a finalist with Alya Al Ali (عليا أل علي in Arabic), from the United Arab Emirates.

Before joining Now United, Nour had a band with her friends called Front Row.

Her first song as a member of Now United was "Habibi". She later released the Arabic version of the song called "حبيبي" ("Habibi" in Arabic).

With the group and at the age of 19, Nour was the first Lebanese to be nominated for Meus Prêmios Nick, the Brazilian version of Nickelodion's Kids' Choice Awards. Nour went on a global tour with Now United since 11 March 2022 (Wave Your Flag World Tour).

On September 17, 2026, she announced her departure from Now United to pursue a solo career. On the same day she released her debut single, "Keep Up".

=== Interviews and editorials ===
Nour was considered "arguably the biggest Gen Z role model in the Arab world" by Cosmopolitan Middle East in the article Nour Ardakani Is Putting Up a Now United Front. She has also been interviewed by ET Arabia, The Insider, MTV Lebanon, Jornal Al Khaleej, Al Arabiya and Al Jadeed.

Some major music websites such as Variety, The National News, NBC, and Harper's Bazaar Arabia covered Nour's performance and her career.

== Personal life ==
Nour is from a Baha’i family and she has Iranian roots on her father’s side specifically from the city of Ardakan. She used to live with her mother, father, and two siblings, Jad and Ryan, in Mansourieh, Lebanon, but now she currently lives in Los Angeles due to her work in Now United.

She is fluent in Arabic, English and French. She studied Nutrition and Business at the American University of Beirut.

She also composes songs, plays the piano, ukulele and is currently learning to play the guitar.

== Discography ==
=== As lead artist ===
List of singles as lead artist, showing year released and album name
Title	Year	Album
"So Good"	2023	Non-album singles
"Miles Above the Moon"	2024	Non-album singles
"Keep Up"	2026	TBA

== Awards and nominees ==
Year	Award	Category	Nominee	Results	Ref
2021	Murex d'Or	Best Arabic song	Habibi حبيبي (Arabic version) - Now United	Nominated	
2021	Murex d'Or	Public Award	Nour Ardakani	Nominated	
2021	Arab Woman Awards	Young Talent	Nour Ardakani	Winner	
