= Sabina Hidalgo =

Mexican singer and dancer (born 1999)

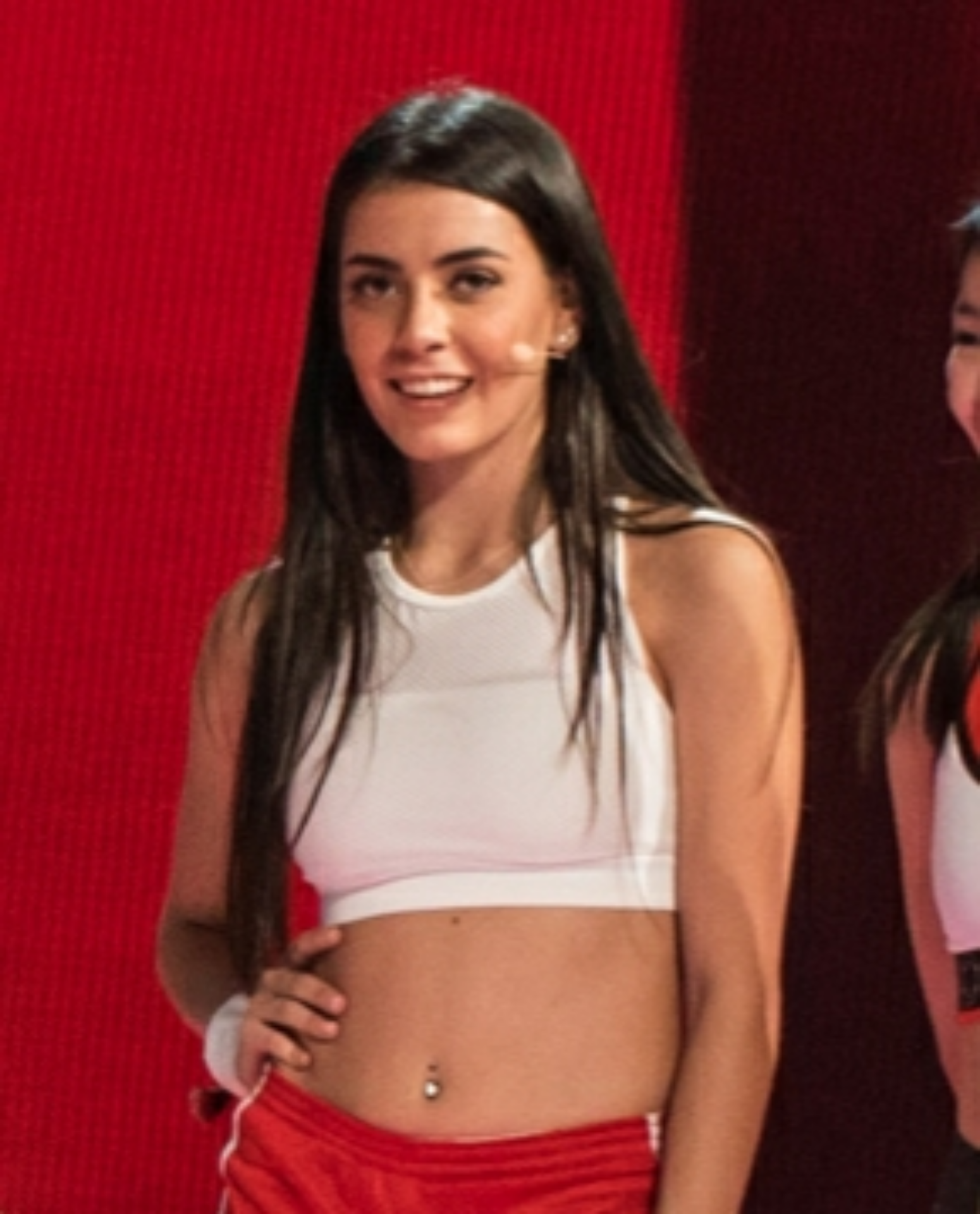
- Hidalgo in 2018
- Born: Maria Sabina Hidalgo Pano; September 20, 1999 (age 27); Guadalajara, Jalisco, Mexico
- Occupations: Singer; dancer
- Agent: XIX Entertainment (2017-2023)
- Spouse: Tepa González (2024-2025) Leon Leiden (2026-present)
- Children: 1
- Musical career
- Genre: Pop
- Instrument: Vocals
- Years active: 2017–present
- Label: XIX Entertainment
- Member of: Now United

María Sabina Hidalgo Pano (born September 20, 1999), better known as Sabina Hidalgo, is a Mexican singer and dancer. She was a member of the global pop group Now United, representing Mexico.

She became known after being signed by Simon Fuller, manager of the girl band Spice Girls, to join Now United, representing her home country.

== Early life ==
Hidalgo was born in Guadalajara, Mexico, on 20 September 1999. At the age of two, she realized her desire to become a dancer. Her singing and love for reggaeton started when she heard Daddy Yankee's "Gasolina", after which she began taking singing lessons.

In 2017, Hidalgo was announced as the Mexican representative of pop group Now United. In December of the same year, the group released their first single, "Summer In The City".

== Personal life ==
Hidalgo is married to Mexican footballer, Tepa González. They were dating on-and-off since 2017. On February 24, 2022, Hidalgo announced her pregnancy. She gave birth to a son (Enzo González Hidalgo) on August 4, 2022. On June 3, 2023, Hidalgo became engaged to González.

== Filmography ==
=== Music videos ===
| Year | Title | Artist | Ref. |
|---|---|---|---|
| 2017 | "Niña” | Carlos Unger | |

| Year | Title | Artista | |
|---|---|---|---|
| 2025 | "Tu final | Sabina hidalgo | |
| 2025 | ''So hot" | Sabina hidalgo | |
| 2026 | "Gatinha" | Sabina hidalgo | |
| 2026 | "Vicio" | Sabina Hidalgo | Single for her first EP |

=== Documentaries ===
| Year | Title | Character | Notes | Reference |
|---|---|---|---|---|
| 2018 | Meet Sabina | Herself | A video where Hidalgo tells her life story. | |
| 2018 | Dreams Come True: The Documentary | Herself | Documentary showing the creation of the global pop group Now United | |

== Awards and nominations ==
At 20 years old, Hidalgo was the first Mexican in history to be nominated for MTV's VMA (Video Music Awards). She competed for the Best Group award with Now United.
