= Noah Urrea =

American actor and singer (born 2001)

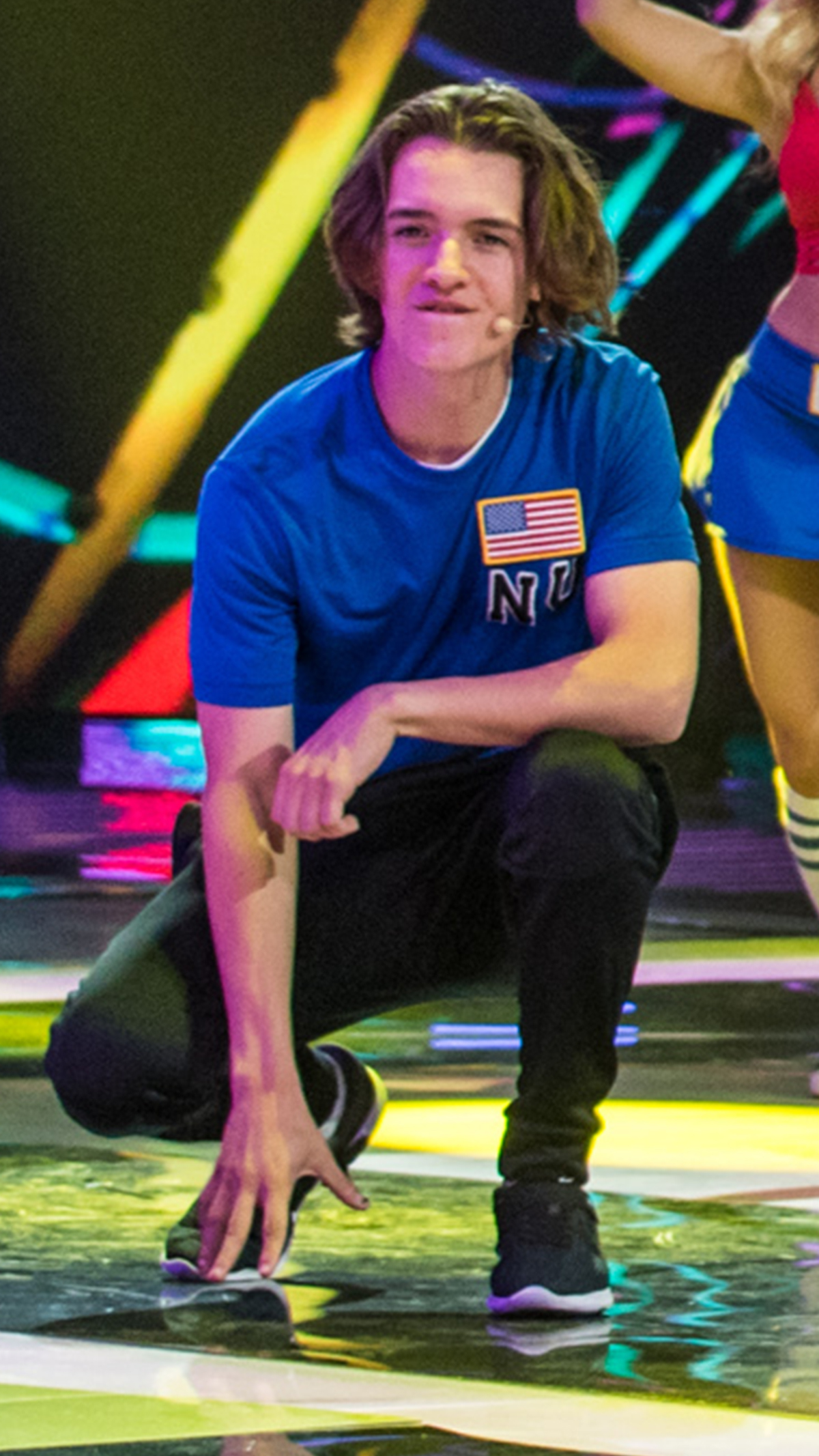
- Noah Urrea during The Voice Kids Russia in 2018
- Born: Noah Jacob Urrea; 31 March 2001 (age 25); Orange, California, U.S.
- Occupations: Singer; actor
- Years active: 2011–present
- Agent: LA Models
- Partner: Abby-Lynn Keen
- Musical career
- Genre: Pop
- Instrument: Vocals
- Labels: AWAL; XIX Entertainment; RCA Records; Nu Global Entertainment
- Formerly of: Now United
- Website: hellonoahnoah.com

Signature
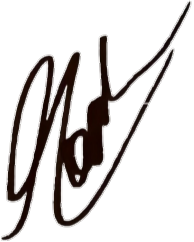

Noah Jacob Urrea (born March 31, 2001) is an actor and singer who was in the pop group Now United from 2017 to 2022. Afterward, he launched a solo career.

== Early life ==
Urrea was born to Marco and Wendy Urrea in Orange, California, on March 31, 2001. He is the youngest of three children. He is of Mexican descent on his father's side and has Dutch, French, English, Scottish, and German ancestry on his mother's side.

== Career ==
=== 2011–2015: Early acting career ===
He had his first chance as an artist in 2011, when he appeared in Blake Shelton's music video, "Honey Bee". In 2012, Urrea was selected as one of Nickelodeon's 'Groundlings', where he developed the talent for improvised comedy.

Urrea made his film debut in 2013 with a role in A Madea Christmas, in which he acted and sang. He played "Bailey McCoy", opposite Tyler Perry, Alicia Witt and Chad Michael Murray. In 2014, Urrea played "Ryan Wade" at the age of 9 in The Identical, another role in which he sang. For his interpretation of Jameses in the 2014 short film Eleven, Urrea won the 'Best Young Actor Award' at the 'Action on Film International Film Festival'. In 2015, Urrea acted as "Cody Mcbride" on Amazon Prime's The Kicks series. Urrea has also appeared in many TV series, including Childrens Hospital, Sam & Cat, Gortimer Gibbon's Life on Normal Street, The Fosters, See Dad Run, Speechless, Nicky, Ricky, Dicky & Dawn and My Super Sweet 16.

=== 2017–2022: Early career as a singer, Now United, A Wake, Netflix ===
In March 2017, he released his EP, Always. In June 2017, Urrea played the twins Mason and Mitchel in the independent film A Wake which premiered in 2020.

On November 13, 2017, Urrea was revealed as one of the members of Now United, being the fourth revealed at the time. In December of the same year, the group released their first single, "Summer in the City". On April 9, 2020, the song "Wake Up" was released on digital platforms, along with the music video, which was Noah who directed it. On October 18, 2022, Noah announced his departure of the group to pursue his solo career. On November 14 of the same year, Now United released "Good Intentions", which was his farewell solo song.

In October 2020, Urrea was scheduled to star in a movie on Netflix called Metal Lords, which was released in April 2022. He played Clay Moss.

=== 2024–present ===
In October 2024, Urrea signed with RCA Records. On September 29, 2025, Urrea released his first single, “Belly Dance”.

== Filmography ==
=== Film ===
Year	Title	Character	Notes
2011	Grand Escape	Charlie (young)	Short film
2013	A Madea Christmas	Bailey McCoy	
2014	The Identical	Drexel Hemsley/Ryan Wade (young)	
2014	Eleven	James (young)	Short film
2019	A Wake	Mason/Mitchel	
2021	Love, Love, Love. A Musical	Noah	Short film
2022	Metal Lords	Clay Moss	

=== Television ===
Year	Title	Character	Notes
2012	Children's Hospital	Trevor	Cameo
2013	Twang	Noah Montgomery	TV Pilot
2014	Sam & Cat	Jett Zander	Episode 35
2014	See Dad Run	Hi-Def Boy	(Season 2; Episode 14)
2015–2016	Gortimer Gibbon's Life on Normal Street	Randy	Recurring
2016	The Kicks	Cody McBride	Recurring
2017	The Fosters	Todd	Cameo (Season 4; Episode 18)
2017	Nicky, Ricky, Dicky & Dawn	Dylan	Cameo (Season 3; Episode 19)
2017	My Super Sweet 16	Himself	Feature (Season 10; Episode 2)
2019	Speechless	Kai	Cameo (Season 3; Episode 17)

=== Documentaries ===
Year	Title	Character	Notes	Reference
2018	Meet Noah	Himself	A short documentary-style introduction video on Now United’s YouTube channel.	
2018	Dreams Come True: The Documentary	Himself	Documentary showing the creation of the global pop group Now United	

== Discography ==
=== Extended plays ===
Title	Details
Always	Released: March 24, 2017; Label: Self-released; Formats: Digital download, streaming

=== Singles ===
==== As lead artist ====
List of singles as lead artist, showing year released, with selected chart positions and album name
Title	Year	Peaks	Album
Title	Year	US Bub.	Album
"Always"	2017	—	Always
"Flowers"	2023	—	Non-album singles
"Belly Dance"	2025	—	Non-album singles
"On N On"	2025	—	Non-album singles
"Standard Love Song" with Ashes to Amber	2026	—	Non-album singles
"Hot Rod"	2026	—	Non-album singles
"Explanation Song"	2026	—	Non-album singles
"—" denotes a recording that did not chart or was not released in that territory.

== Awards and nominations ==
Year	Award	Category	Nominated	Result	Ref.
2014	Action On Film International Film Festival	Best Young Actor Award	Eleven	Won	
2020	You Pop Awards	Favorite International Singer	Noah Urrea	Won	
