= Josh Beauchamp =

Canadian-American singer and dancer (born 2000)

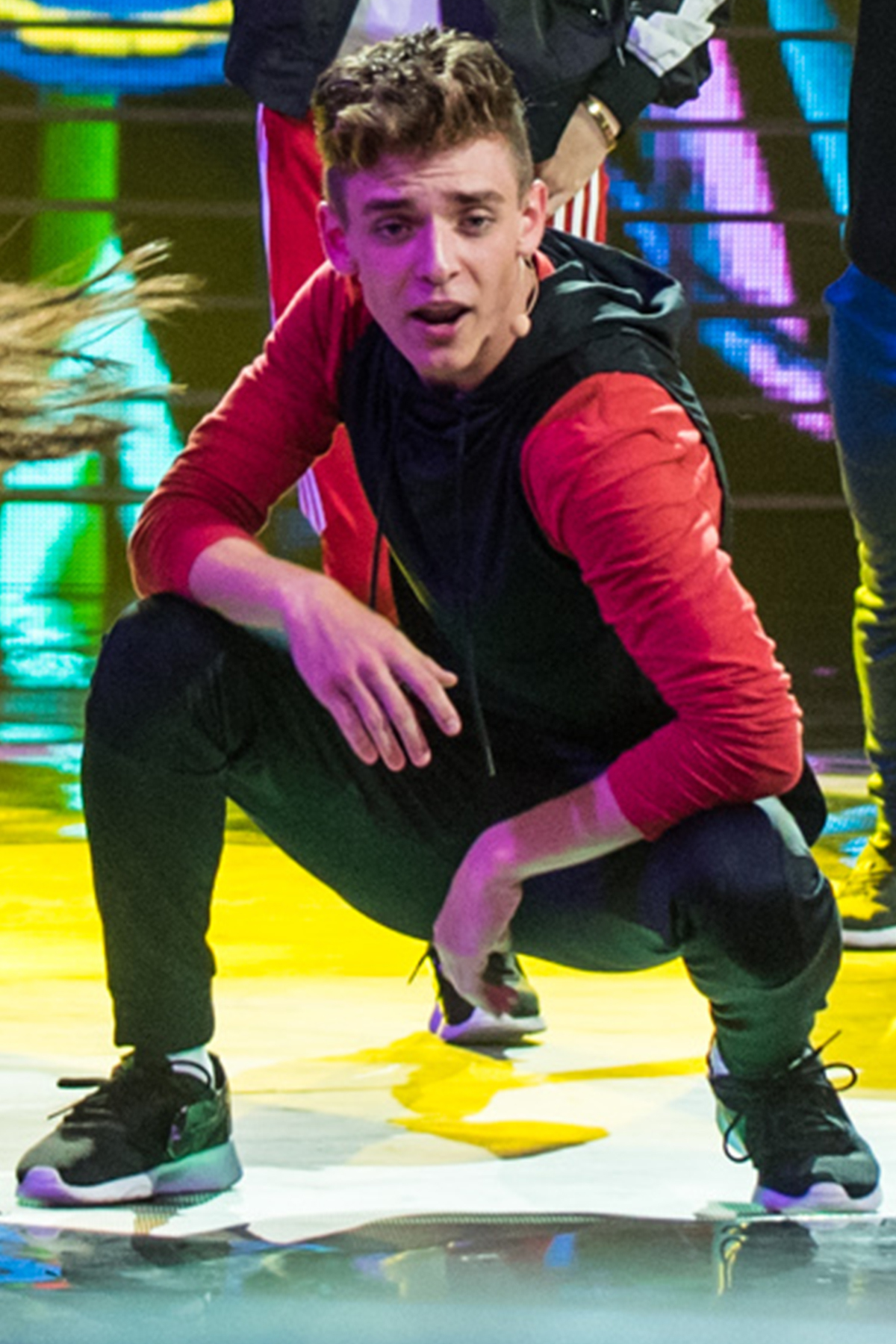
- Beauchamp in 2018
- Born: Joshua Kyle Beauchamp; March 31, 2000 (age 26); Edmonton, Alberta, Canada
- Occupations: Singer; dancer; choreographer; model
- Years active: 2017–present
- Agents: Simon Fuller (2017–2022); Eric Podwall (2022-currently)
- Musical career
- Genres: Pop
- Instruments: Vocals, Guitar, Piano
- Labels: XIX Entertainment; AWAL
- Formerly of: Now United

Signature
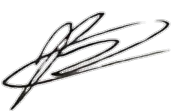

Joshua Kyle Beauchamp (born March 31, 2000) is a Canadian-American singer, dancer, choreographer and model. He was a member of international pop group Now United, representing Canada, from 2017 to 2022.

== Early life ==
Beauchamp was born on March 31, 2000, in the city of Edmonton, Alberta and grew up in the city of St. Albert, Alberta. His father, Ron Beauchamp, is Canadian and his mother Ursula is American. He has an older brother named Jonah and a younger brother named Jaden. He began dance lessons at the age of six.

== Career ==
=== 2017–2022: Music career beginnings and Now United ===
Before becoming a member of the group Now United, Beauchamp was part of dance companies NXG Company and ImmaBeast. He participated in the American reality television show World of Dance season 1 as a member of ImmaBeast and in season 2 as a pair with childhood friend Taylor Hatala.

Beauchamp was invited to audition to be a founding member of Now United by music producer Simon Fuller in 2017. Originally seeking to represent the United States (holding citizenship through his mother), he was allowed to represent Canada when Fuller learned of his background. On November 10, 2022, he announced that he would be leaving Now United to pursue a solo career; the "Forever United Tour" was his last appearance as a member.

=== 2023–present: Solo activities ===
Beauchamp and dancer Charlize Glass were featured in the music video for the song "That's What Love Is" from Justin Bieber's album Changes. He is working on his debut solo album.

== Filmography ==
Films
Year	Title	Role	Artist	Notes
2018	Dreams Come True: The Documentary	Himself	Now United	Documentary showing the creation of the global pop group Now United
2020	That’s What Love Is	Himself	Justin Bieber	Music video
2021	Love, Love, Love. A Musical	Himself	Now United	Short film
2023	The Musical: Welcome to the Night of Your Life	Himself	Now United	Movie
