= Mandon =

Mandon may refer to:

== Places ==
- Mandon Lake, lake in Michigan

== People ==
=== Middle name ===
- Alex Mandon Rey (born 2005), Spanish entertainer

=== Surname ===
- Daniel Mandon (1939–2023), French teacher and politician
- Emmanuel Mandon (born 1965), French politician
- Gilbert Mandon (1799–1866), French mining engineer and botanist
- Thierry Mandon (born 1957), French politician
