= José González (footballer, born 1998) =

Mexican footballer

Personal information
- Full name: José de Jesús González Muñoz
- Date of birth: 19 November 1998 (age 27)
- Place of birth: Tepatitlán, Jalisco, Mexico
- Height: 1.82 m (5 ft 11 1/2 in)
- Position: Forward

Team information
- Current team: Cartaginés

Youth career
- 2013–2018: Guadalajara
- 2014: CD Aves Blancas

Senior career*
Years	Team	Apps	(Gls)
2018–2023	Guadalajara	14	(1)
2018–2019	→ Tudelano (loan)	19	(0)
2020–2021	→ UdeG (loan)	53	(7)
2022–2023	→ Tapatío (loan)	39	(10)
2024–2025	Atlético San Luis	8	(0)
2024–2025	→ Herediano (loan)	30	(9)
2026	Herediano	0	(0)
2026–	Cartaginés	0	(0)
- * Club domestic league appearances and goals as of 5 April 2025

José de Jesús González Muñoz, or 'Tepa' González; (born 19 November 1998) is a Mexican professional footballer who plays as a forward for Liga FPD club Cartaginés.

== Personal life ==
González has a son named Enzo, born on August 4, 2022, with the singer Sabina Hidalgo, who he has been dating off and on since 2017, from Now United. In 2023 they got engaged, in May 2024 they married. In May 2025, it was announced the end of the marriage.

== Career statistics ==
=== Club ===
As of 20 May 2023

Club	Season	League			Cup		Continental		Other		Total	
Club	Season	Division	Apps	Goals	Apps	Goals	Apps	Goals	Apps	Goals	Apps	Goals
Guadalajara	2019–20	Liga MX	1	0	2	0	–		–		3	0
Guadalajara	2022–23	Liga MX	13	1	–		–		—		13	1
Guadalajara	Total		14	1	2	0	–		–		16	1
Tudelano (loan)	2018–19	Segunda División B	19	0	1	0	–		–		20	0
UdeG (loan)	2019–20	Ascenso MX	6	1	–		–		–		6	1
UdeG (loan)	2020–21	Liga de Expansión MX	28	4	–		–		—		28	4
UdeG (loan)	2021–22	Liga de Expansión MX	19	2	–		–		—		19	2
UdeG (loan)	Total		53	7	–		–		–		53	7
Tapatío (loan)	2021–22	Liga de Expansión MX	16	1	—		—		—		16	1
Tapatío (loan)	2022–23	Liga de Expansión MX	23	9	—		—		—		23	9
Tapatío (loan)	Total		39	10	–		–		–		39	10
Career total			125	18	3	0	0	0	0	0	128	18

== Honours ==
Tapatío

- Liga de Expansión MX: Clausura 2023
