= Ariel Tsang =

Hong Kong singer and actress

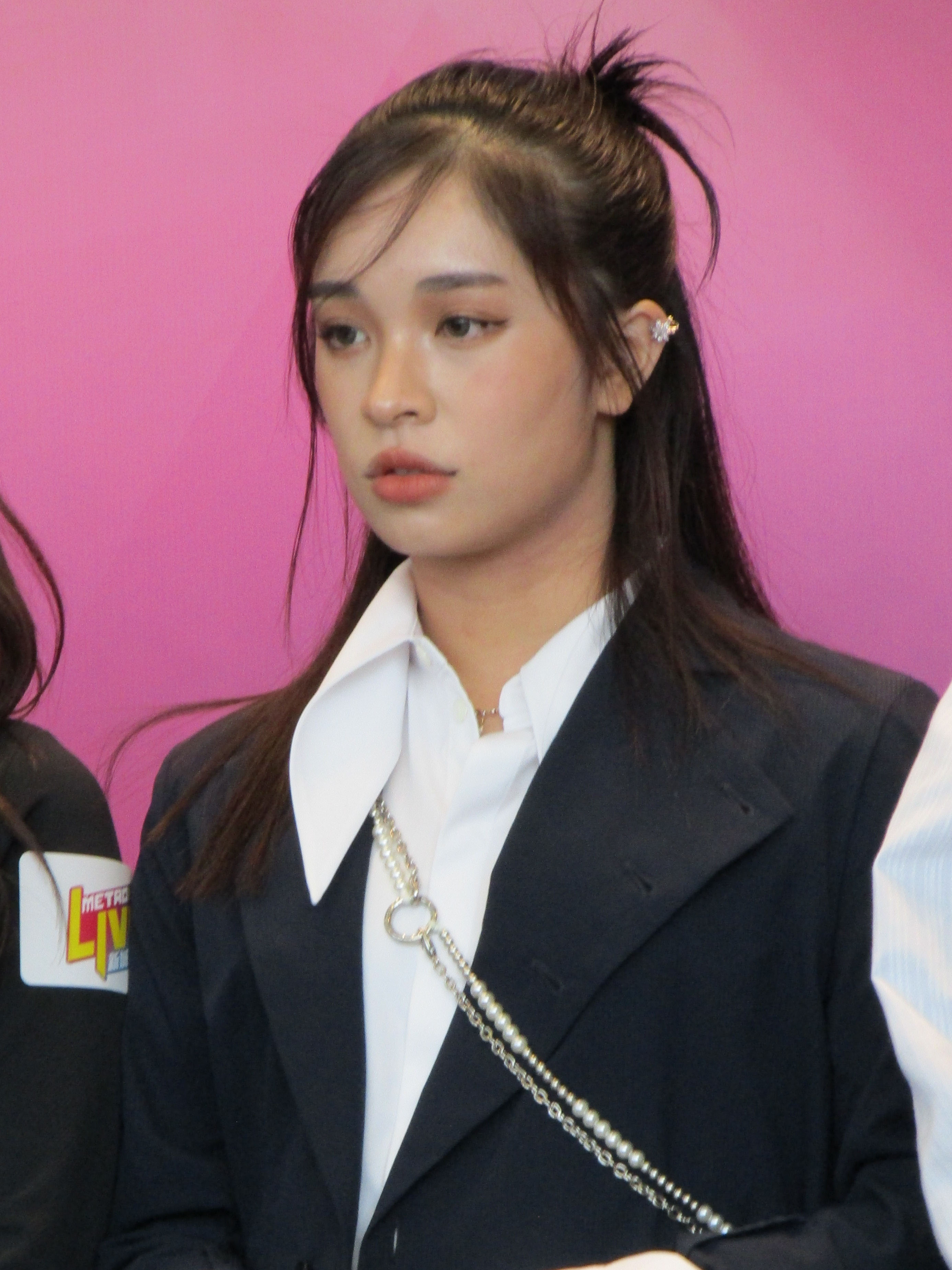
- Born: January 14, 2005 (age 20); Hong Kong
- Other names: Oreo
- Occupations: Singer, actress
- Organization: Now United
- Website: https://www.instagram.com/oreohh/

Ariel Tsang (born 14 January 2005), also known by her nickname Oreo, is a Hong Kong singer and actress. She is a former member of the pop group Strayz and currently a member of Now United.

== Career ==
In 2018, Ariel Tsang participated in the filming of the documentary Hong Kong Connection – K-Pop Dream by Hong Kong's public broadcaster RTHK.

In 2021, she took part in the reality show King Maker IV organized by ViuTV, where she was the second youngest contestant. Although she was initially eliminated, she caught the attention of the show runner and was given a second chance in the programme. She ultimately made it to the finals, being the youngest among the top 20, and finished in 18th place, without being invited to officially debut.

Tsang was later invited to join Strayz, a group formed by contestants from King Maker IV, debuting on April 19, 2022.

In August 2025, at an event held at Tai Kwun, Ariel Tsang became a new member of the global pop group Now United, under the partnership between the Hong Kong Jockey Club and Simon Fuller’s XIX Entertainment, representing Hong Kong, China.
