= Heyoon Jeong =

South Korean dancer, singer, rapper, choreographer

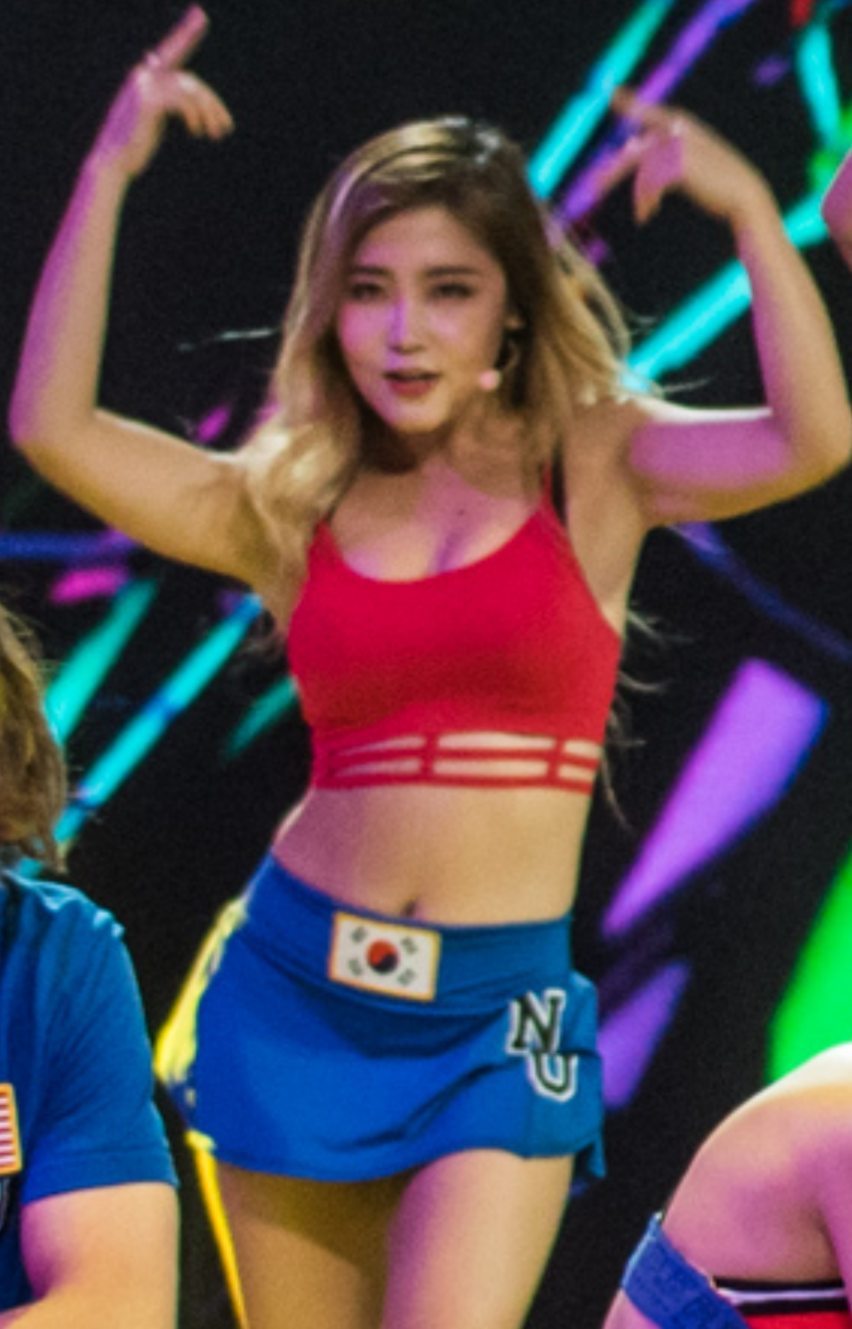
- Jeong in 2018
- Born: Jeong Hye-yoon; October 1, 1996 (age 30); Daejeon, South Korea
- Other name: Heyoon
- Occupations: Singer; choreographer; dancer; rapper
- Years active: 2017–present
- Agents: XIX Entertainment (2017–2023) Universal Music Korea (2024-present)
- Musical career
- Genres: Pop; K-pop
- Instrument: Vocals
- Years active: 2017–present
- Labels: Universal Music Korea; AWAL; XIX Entertainment
- Formerly of: Now United

Korean name
- Hangul: 정혜윤
- RR: Jeong Hyeyun
- MR: Chŏng Hyeyun

Jeong Hye-yoon (Korean: 정혜윤; born October 1, 1996), better known as Heyoon Jeong or simply Heyoon, is a South Korean dancer, singer, rapper and choreographer. She represented South Korea in the global pop group Now United and announced her departure from the pop group on March 3, 2023. She made her solo debut on November 13, 2024 with the song "Pivot" featuring Armani White.

== Biography ==
Heyoon was born in Daejeon, South Korea on October 1, 1996. At the age of three, Heyoon started practicing ballet. A few years later, she decided that she wanted to become a musician. In 2015, she moved to Seoul to pursue a professional career in the music industry.

== Career ==
=== 2017–2023: Early career and Now United ===
Before joining the group, Heyoon, was a dance instructor at 1MILLION Dance Studio in South Korea.

On November 15, 2017, Heyoon was announced as part of the final lineup for global pop group Now United. In December of the same year, the group released their first single, "Summer in the City".

In August 2020, the single "Nobody Fools Me Twice" was released. On September 18, 2020, the music video for "The Weekend's Here" was released. She co-directed the music video along with Dima Kovalchuk. She also directed the music video for the September 2020 Now United single "Somebody". She left Now United in March 2023.

=== 2023–present: Solo career ===
In October 2024, Heyoon signed to Universal Music Korea. On November 13, 2024, Heyoon released her debut solo single, "Pivot", featuring American rapper Armani White. She released "ASAP", featuring American rapper Chris Patrick, in February 2025. In July 2025, she released the single "Addicted". She released her Seriously Unserious EP in April 2026.

== Discography ==
=== EPs ===
Title	Details
Seriously Unserious	Released: April 14, 2026; Label: Universal; Format: Digital download, streaming

=== Singles ===
==== As lead artist ====
List of singles as lead artist, showing year released, with selected chart positions and album name
Title	Year	Peaks	Album
Title	Year	KOR	Album
"Pivot" (featuring Armani White)	2024	—	Non-album singles
"ASAP" (featuring Chris Patrick)	2025	—	Non-album singles
"Addicted"	2025	—	Non-album singles
"—" denotes a recording that did not chart or was not released in that territory.

== Filmography ==
=== Music videos ===
Music videos directed by Heyoon Jeong
Year	Music video	With	Artist	Ref.
2020	"Nobody Fools Me Twice"	Hayley Costey, Dima Kovalchuk	Now United	
2020	"The Weekend's Here"	Dima Kovalchuk	Now United	
2020	"Somebody"	Dima Kovalchuk	Now United	
