= Strayz =

Hong Kong Cantopop girl group

- Origin: Hong Kong
- Genres: Cantopop; Dance-pop; hip hop; EDM
- Years active: 2022–present
- Labels: Daymaker Creatives
- Members: CK Wong; Valentina Cho; Wyllis Lam; Natalie Ho; Ariel Tsang

Strayz (commonly stylised as STRAYZ) is a self-financed Hong Kong Cantopop girl group formed through ViuTV's reality talent show King Maker IV in 2021. The group consists of five members: CK Wong, Valentina Cho, Wyllis Lam, Natalie Ho and Ariel Tsang. They debuted in April 2022, with their debut "Stray" released in July the same year.

== Members ==
English name	Traditional Chinese Name	Member Alias	Birthday
CK Wong	黃斯琪	CK	24 January 1997 (age 28)
Valentina Cho (Leader)	趙展彤	Val	7 August 1997 (age 28)
Wyllis Lam	林暐翹	Wai Kiu (暐翹)	17 October 2001 (age 24)
Natalie Ho	何榛綦	Nat	21 August 2003 (age 22)
Ariel Tsang	曾家瑩	Ariel	14 January 2005 (age 20)

== Discography ==
=== Singles ===
- Stray (2022)
- Margarita (2022)
- Matter Of A Second (2023)

=== Collaborations ===
Title	Year	Album	Artists	Notes
"Star War (星戰)"	2023	Ireallylovetosing	Leo Ku & New Generation	

== Filmography ==
=== Television shows ===
Year	Title	Platform
2021	King Maker IV	ViuTV

== Videography ==
=== Music videos ===
Year	Title	Artist(s)	Director(s)	Choreographer(s)	Length	Ref.
2022	"Stray"	STRAYZ	CK Wong, Johnny	—	4:29	
2022	"Margarita"	STRAYZ	Ifan Yu@Keep Rollin	Haha Cheng	3:11	
2023	"Matter Of A Second"	STRAYZ	Lewis Lau@LEWImage	Winge Yu	3:21	
2023	"Star War"	Leo Ku & New Generation	JerL & Lance Luk	—	5:48	

== Awards and nominations ==
Award ceremony	Year	Category	Result
Ultimate Song Chart Awards Presentation	2022	Best Rookie Groups	Bronze
