= Lamar Morris (British singer) =

English singer, songwriter and dancer (born 1999)

- Born: Lamar Morris; 1 December 1999 (age 26); Dagenham, Essex, England
- Other name: Lamar Hype
- Occupations: Singer; songwriter; dancer
- Years active: 2010–present
- Agent: XIX Entertainment
- Musical career
- Genres: Pop; R&B; soul
- Instruments: Vocals; Piano
- Years active: 2017–present
- Labels: XIX Entertainment (2017–2023); Babar Music (2024–present)

Lamar Morris (born 1 December 1999) is an English singer, songwriter and dancer. He is known for participating in the British series The Hour. He also was a member of the global pop group Now United, representing the United Kingdom.

== Career ==
=== 2010–2011: Early career ===
He participated in dance productions with the YMCA Tensing dance team in 2010. He signed with the Rhodes agency drama school. In 2011 Lamar participated in an episode of the British series The Hour.

=== 2017–2020: Now United ===
On 15 November 2017 Lamar's name was revealed as one of the members of the global pop group Now United, being the ninth so far. On 6 December 2017 Lamar, together with the other members of Now United, released "Summer in the City", a preview single.

After his debut in April 2018, Lamar became inactive in the group, returning to small activities, such as performances near England. In September 2018, the film Ruined was released, with Lamar being part of the cast.

In June 2019, Lamar returned to the activities of Now United during the filming of "Crazy Stupid Silly Love", and soon recorded the final version of "Like That". Then, together with Any, he re-recorded "You Give Me Something", and returned to the hiatus, not participating in the group's third tour, Dreams Come True Tour.

=== 2020–present: Early solo career ===
On 22 November 2020, the singer Southside Diddy released "Roccstar Disappointments" featuring Lamar. In 2021, Lamar had his comeback on Now United appearing in the remake of the "Let The Music Move You" video on 1 May, in "Nobody Like Us" on 28 May and then having his second feature clip in "NU Party" on 18 June, where Lamar is credited as songwriter and producer on the song. Still on Now United, Lamar will release another solo song called "My Delicate Flower" on 30 June, with him as a guest appearance in his friend Donrique's song along with Southside Diddy.

On 20 January 2023, Lamar released "Love Louder", as part of The Meeps. On 8 September, the singer Mélanie released "Misconception" featuring Lamar. On 22 September, Lamar released "Bop Bop", his debut single.

On 17 August 2024, Lamar released "Polaroid". On 19 August, Lamar released "Coco Roll". On 25 October, Lamar released "Rendezvous". On 13 December, Lamar released "Control".

== Discography ==
=== As lead artist ===
List of singles as lead artist, showing year released, with selected chart positions and album name
Title	Year	Peaks	Album
Title	Year	UK	Album
"Bop Bop"	2023	—	Non-album single
"Polaroid"	2024	—	TBA
"Coco Roll"	2024	—	TBA
"Rendezvous"	2024	—	TBA
"Control"	2024	—	TBA
"—" denotes a recording that did not chart or was not released in that territory.

=== As a featured artist ===
List of singles as a featured artist, showing year released, with selected chart positions and album name
Title	Year	Peak chart positions	Album
Title	Year	UK	Album
"Roccstar Disappointments" (Southside Diddy featuring Lamar Morris)	2020	—	How Can I Lose
"My Delicate Flower" (Donrique featuring Southside Diddy and Lamar Morris)	2021	—	Non-album singles
"Misconception" (Mélanie featuring Lamar Morris)	2023	—	Non-album singles
"—" denotes a recording that did not chart or was not released in that territory.

==== Promotional singles ====
List of promotional singles, showing year released and album name
Title	Year	Album
"Love Louder" (as part of The Meeps)	2023	Non-album promotional single

== Filmography ==
Year	Title	Paper	Ref.
2011	The Hour	Boy 1	
2018	Ruined	Actor	
2023	The Musical: Welcome to the Night of Your Life	Sterling	

=== Documentaries ===
Year	Title	Character	Notes	Reference
2018	Dreams Come True: The Documentary	Himself	Documentary showing the creation of the global pop group Now United	

== Tours ==
=== Opening act ===
- Emblem3 – Live in Brazil 2024 (2024)
