= Alex Mandon Rey =

Spanish dancer, actor, artist (born 2005)

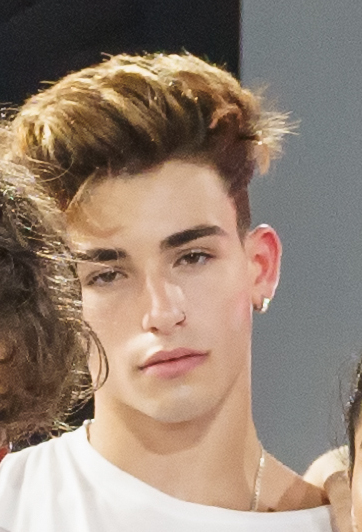
- Alex in 2021
- Born: Alex Mandon Rey; Palma, Mallorca, Spain
- Website: www.alextopdancer.com

Alex Mandon Rey, known by the stage name Alextopdancer, is a Spanish entertainer. He was one of four finalist on the Spanish TV show (RTVE) "The Dancer" in 2021. In April 2021, representing Spain, he became the 18th member of global pop group Now United. On August 31, 2023 Alex announced his departure from the group to start his solo career. On October 21, he received the golden buzzer in Got Talent España. On 2025, he participated on Santos Bravos and he was one of the ten finalists.
