= Now United =

Global pop group

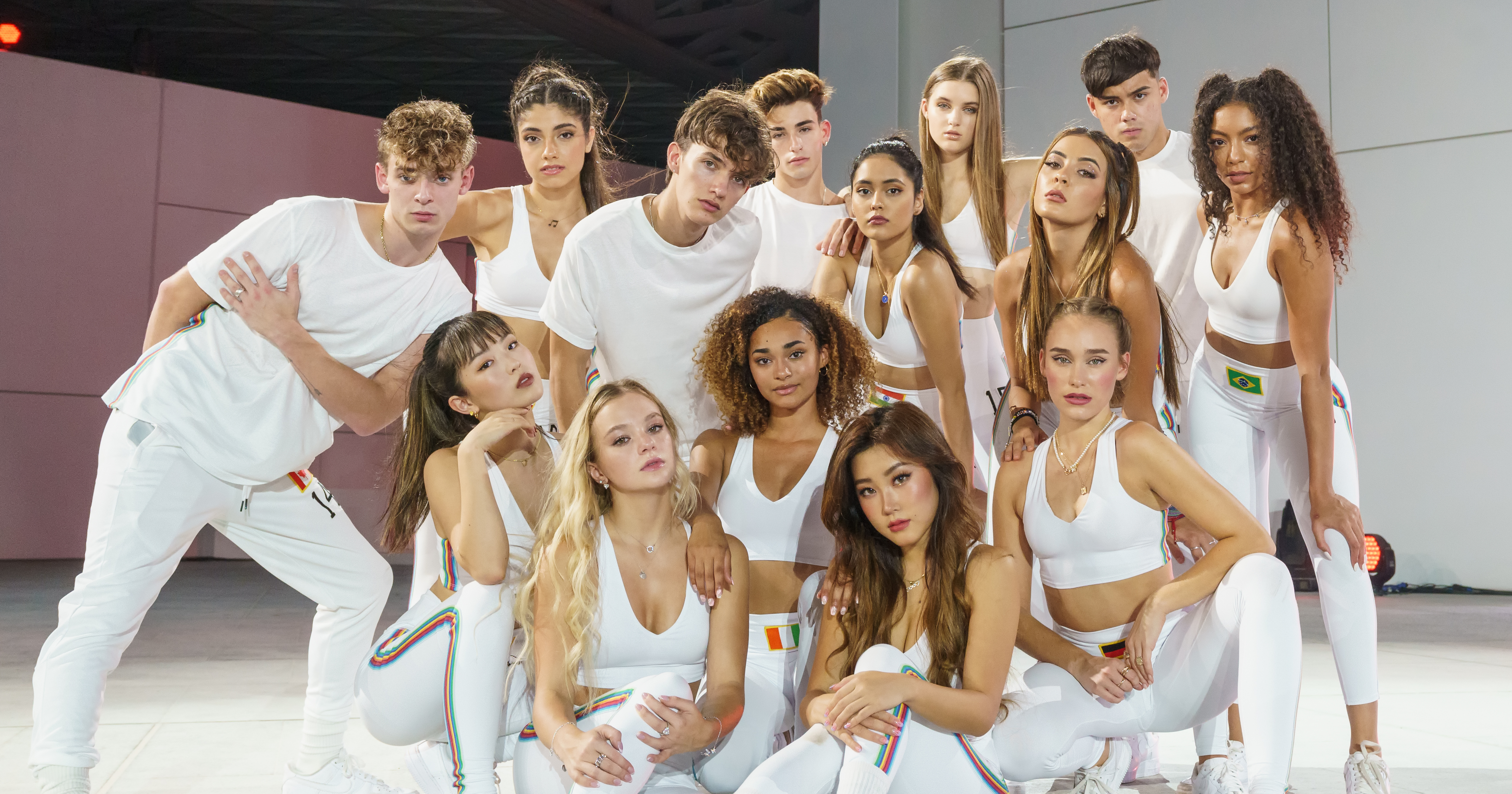
- Now United in 2021

Background information
- Origin: Los Angeles, California, U.S.
- Genres: Pop; dance-pop
- Years active: 2017–present
- Labels: XIX Entertainment; AWAL
- Members: Ariel Tsang; Desirée Silva; Jayna Hughes; Rachel Manurung; Savannah Clarke; Luke Brown
- Past members: Alex Mandon Rey; Any Gabrielly; Diarra Sylla; Heyoon Jeong; Hina Yoshihara; Krystian Wang; Joalin Loukamaa; Josh Beauchamp; Lamar Morris; Mélanie Thomas; Noah Urrea; Shivani Paliwal; Bailey May; Sina Deinert; Sofya Plotnikova; Sabina Hidalgo; Zane Carter; Nour Ardakani
- Website: nowunited.com

Now United (sometimes abbreviated as NU) is a global pop group formed in West Hollywood, Los Angeles County, USA, in 2017 by Idols creator Simon Fuller. Originally debuting with 14 members from 14 different countries, the group has since represented a total of 20 countries and special administrative region and featured 23 official members.

Now United operates on a rotational system, where members may be active, inactive, or return temporarily for specific projects or tours. Some members have left to pursue solo careers, but they are still considered part of the Now United family. The group's motto is: "Once a Now United member, always a Now United member." Their dynamic structure allows for new members to be added and for representation to be passed to a new generation.

== History ==
=== 2017: Pre-debut, announcement, and "Summer in the City" ===
In mid-2016, Idols creator and Spice Girls manager Simon Fuller began searching for talent to fulfill his plan of creating a global pop group with members from all over the world. The selection took place through social media as well as dance schools and music academies, using expert choreographers, vocal coaches, and songwriters.

In September 2017, Fuller indicated that "to recruit the 14 youngsters in Now United, he employed 20 people to travel the world for 18 months, holding auditions with groups of 10 to 20 people at a time". But after seeing the talents of various youngsters he decided to make a group of 14 members of different nationalities, with future possible members. From 11 November to 22 November 2017, each of the members was revealed. On 13 November, the first teaser of the complete group was released, in the song "Boom Boom" by the record producer and record executive RedOne.

On 5 December 2017, Now United released their first single "Summer in the City", on Al Gore's "24 Hours of Reality", a global broadcast intended to raise awareness around the global climate crisis.

=== 2018: Debut, Promo World Tour and Pepsi ===
In April 2018, the group began its Promo World Tour, where they appeared on many TV shows across the world. The tour began in Moscow, making their first public appearance on television performing "Summer in the City" on the finale of the Russian version of The Voice Kids.

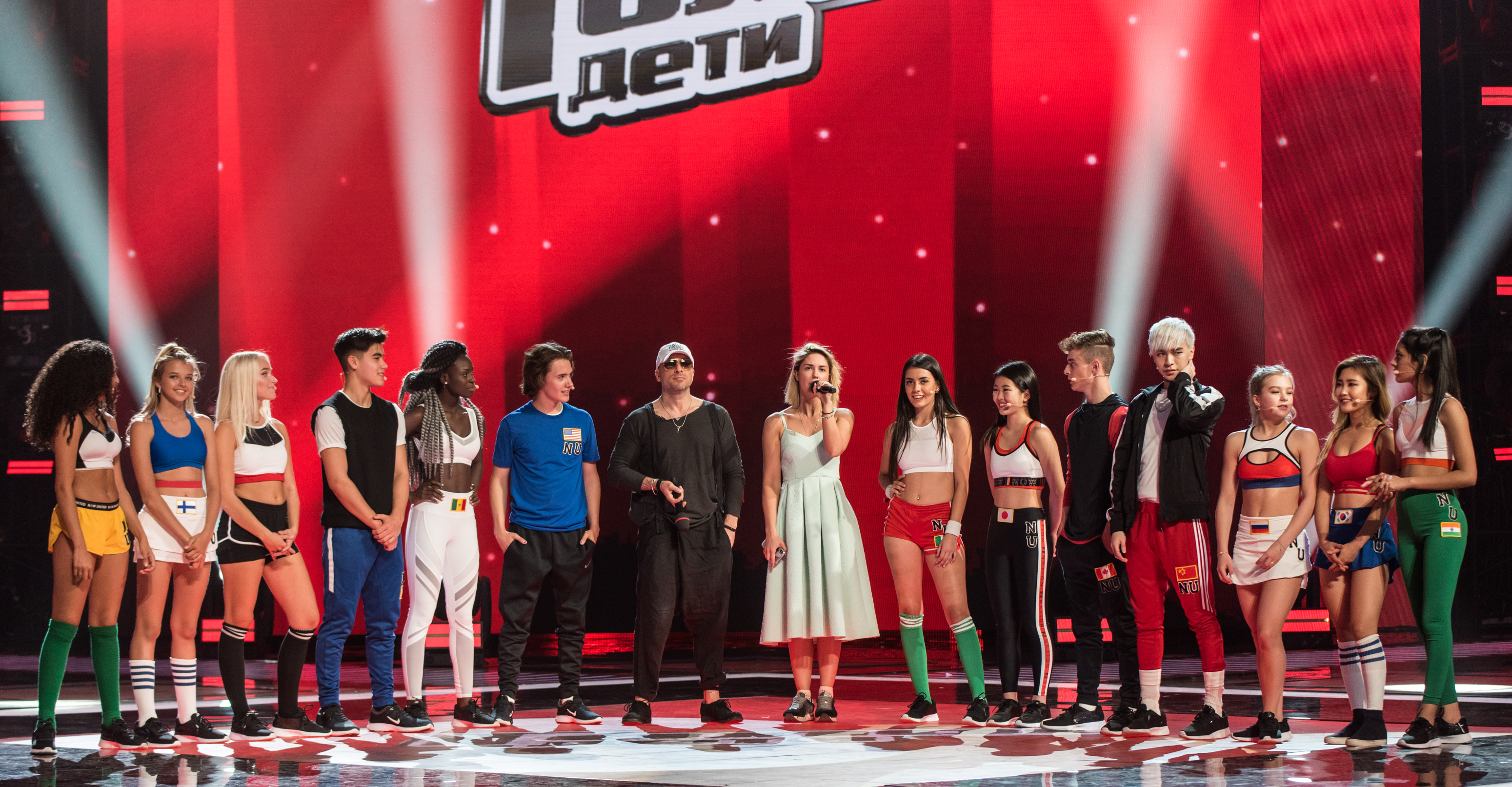
Now United on The Voice Kids Russia in 2018

On 30 May, Now United was featured in the single "One World" with RedOne and Adelina.

On 5 July, Now United debuted in the United States on The Late Late Show with James Corden performing "Summer in the City". On 24 July, Now United released the single/music video for "What Are We Waiting For", filmed in South Korea. On 20 September, Now United released the single/music video for "Who Would Think That Love?", filmed in Mexico. On 15 December, the group released the single/music video for "How We Do It", filmed in India, featuring Indian rapper Badshah.

=== 2019: Special Olympics and Dreams Come True Tour ===
On 29 January 2019, the music video for "Beautiful Life", which was also filmed in India, was also released.

During the Philippines tour, Now United filmed and released the single/music video for "Afraid of Letting Go" on 17 March. On 28 April, the single/music video for "Sundin Ang Puso", which was also filmed in the Philippines was released. The group also participated in the Opening Ceremony of the 2019 Special Olympics World Summer Games in Abu Dhabi. On 7 June, video for "Paraná", was released. By mid-2019, it was announced that two new members would be added to Now United, and that the first would be from Australia. The selection took place through social media and fan voting. On 25 July, Now United released "Sunday Morning". On 11 August, "Crazy Stupid Silly Love" was released. The month after, video for "Like That" was released on 8 September. On 20 September, "You Give Me Something" was released. The song is a bilingual cover of the song by James Morrison and is performed in English and Portuguese by members Lamar Morris and Any Gabrielly. In October, it was officially announced that the search for a new member from the Middle East or North Africa had commenced. They also shot their music video called "Legends" while on tour, which was released on 14 November. During November 2019, the group embarked on their "Dreams Come True Tour" in Brazil. On 15 December, "Na Na Na", which has main vocals from Sabina, which was filmed at the Municipal Theatre in Rio de Janeiro was released. "Let Me Be the One" was released on the 28th.

=== 2020: Quarantine, Destination UAE and new members ===
On 12 February, "Live This Moment" was released being the first single of the year. On 28 February, the group introduced its 15th member, Savannah Clarke from Australia. On 7 March, the single "Come Together" featured Savannah Clarke for the first time. The group was set to embark on their "Come Together" Tour between May and June, which was postponed on 20 March due to COVID-19 concerns.

On 8 May, the single/music video for "Dana Dana" was released, which was filmed remotely amid the coronavirus pandemic. The song had been teased for several months and included Shivani Paliwal's rap in Hindi. "Stand Together" was released on 23 June of the same year.

On 8 August, "Nobody Fools Me Twice" was released, in the Korean language. On 18 August, "Feel It Now" was released. On 2 September, the Spanish version of the single "Na Na Na" was released as "Na Na Na - Spanish Version". On 5 September, Diarra Sylla announced her departure from the group during an interview with The Hollywood Fix. On 14 September, members Heyoon and Josh announced on YouTube that the search for the 16th member would officially begin. The single/music video for "The Weekend's Here" was filmed in Dubai with Sofya, Savannah, Sina, and Heyoon. On 21 September, Simon Fuller, the group's manager, announced the 16th member, Nour Ardakani from Lebanon. On the 30th, the last single of the month was released, called "Somebody" with the first line from Sina Deinert.

On 7 October, "Chained Up" was released, which had been in the works for some time, same as "Live This Moment", the song/music video features the group's boys, but with the addition of Heyoon. On 10 October, the single "Paradise" debuted, but this song was only later released as a music video. The music video/single for "Habibi" was released on 19 October, it was the first music video featuring Nour Ardakani, who served as the center. On 7 November, another single, "One Love", was released. On 17 November, the group announced the search for the 17th member. On 30 November, Mélanie Thomas, from the Ivory Coast, was announced as the new member. On 2 December, the group announced that a new male member would be added to Now United. "Pas Le Choix (Manal Mix)" was the group's new single for the first time. On 10 December, the single was officially released, featuring the girls of the group. This marked the debut of Joalin and Hina in singing, Diarra's return due to a contract still valid from the time she was in the group, and Melanie Thomas' first music video appearance. On 30 December, the last single of the year, "Hewale", starring former-member Diarra, and Mélanie, was released.

=== 2021: Now Love, New Member and Love, Love, Love: A Musical ===
The group released its first song of the year, "How Far We've Come" on 8 January 2021. The next single, which debuted on 15 January, was titled "Lean On Me". "Lean On Me" was shot by choreographer Nicki Andersen and was set in Emirates Palace in Abu Dhabi, UAE. "All Around The World" debuted on 29 January. The video was filmed by each of the members in their native countries.

The first clip, released in March for the single "Paradise" and is called "Paradise - Official Memories Video," debuted on 9 March. Later on 16 March the music video for "Turn It Up" was released, as a part of a partnership with KitKat.

On 10 April, the single/music video for "Fiesta" was released, which was filmed in Mexico, in the hotel garden of Cancun where the members were stranded. Then the single/music video for "Baila" was released, filmed in San Luis Obispo. When they finished filming in San Luis Obispo, they left the farm on 5 April to shoot. A few days later, on 9 April, the boys traveled from Los Angeles to Malibu. After a few days of filming, they traveled to Hawaii on 13 April, where they filmed a few music videos. On 25 April, it was revealed that the 18th member is from Spain. On 28 April, the identity of the new member was disclosed, 15 year-old Mallorca native Alex Mandon Rey.

The single/music video for "Let the Music Move You", which was filmed in Hawaii was released on 1 May. The next release was on 8 May, when the music video for the single "Show You How To Love" was released in Malibu, the single had been previously released solely as audio. Over-the-record lyric videos were released the same month, with "Baila" released on 15 May, "Stand Together" on 17 May, and "Come Together" on 26 May. As a part of a Partnership with Forever 21, they released "Nobody Like Us", which was filmed in Hawaii.

On 1 June, the group announced that it would hold an online concert, the "Now Love Live Show". The music video for "NU Party" was released on the 18th, this featured member Lamar who was on Hiatus. On 28 June, the group announced that it would host its first virtual camp, known as "Camp Now United 2021". The "Now Love Live Show" was filmed at Louvre Abu Dhabi and streamed through YouTube on 1 July, the online concert marked the group's first major concert since 2019 and the debut concert for Nour, Savannah, Melanie and Alex.

"Camp Now United 2021" began filming on 5 July 2021, in Brazil. The music video of "Wave Your Flag" was officially released on the 14th. Filmed at Louvre Abu Dhabi, it marked the debut of Alex Mandon Rey. On 15 July, the launch of the Camp Now United competition was announced, with 12 winners being selected for a trip to Abu Dhabi. Now United's music appeared at the Tokyo 2020 Olympics, with several songs being played at competitions. A lyrics video for "Wave Your Flag" was released on the 30th.

On 15 August, the group announced their first musical, "Love, Love, Love", would be coming soon; it was filmed during their bootcamp (training program) in San Luis Obispo in March–April 2021. A trailer was released the next day on the group's YouTube channel. "Love, Love, Love" was released on 28 August, alongside "When You Love Somebody", "Dance Like That" and "Momento" on the group's YouTube Channel. Bailey May described the experience of filming a musical stating that it was not challenging as he was playing his own character.

It was announced on 6 September, that the group would be traveling to Abu Dhabi for their bootcamp. On 10 September, all three of the "Love, Love, Love" songs ("When You Love Somebody", "Dance Like That" and "Momento") were released on all music platforms. "Ikou" Music video, which was filmed in Mexico, was released on the 11th. Following their bootcamp, it was revealed that they would be traveling to Portugal. The official Music video for "Dance Like That" was released on the 16th. It was announced on the 27th, that the group would be partnering with SheinX Rock the Runway online fashion show.

On 3 October, the group performed "Wave Your Flag" at the 25th Globos de Ouro awards ceremony. A new edition of "Come together" was released on the 4th, alongside the 12 camp winners. The Bootcampers released their first song, "Good Days" on the 7th. The group released two more music videos, "I Got You" and "Anything for You" were released on the 22nd. Another song, "Future Me" which was filmed in Abu Dhabi was released on the 30th. "I Got You" and "Anything For You" was released across all streaming platforms on 11 November. It was announced that the group would be returning to Brazil. Any Gabrielly leaked information during an interview that the group would be touring in 2022. "Future Me" was released across streaming platforms on the 18th. It was officially announced on 21 November, that the group would be embarking on their "Wave Your Flag World Tour" with dates announced in Brazil and Portugal, members reassured fans that future dates would be later announced.

Information surrounding the filming of the "Jump" music video was leaked on 5 December. The group performed "All Day", "Future Me" and "Wave Your Flag" on an aired broadcast of Domingao com Huck on the 12th. Due to high demand, 3 new dates were announced on 17 December in Brazil. The official music video for "Badna Nehlam" was released on the 22nd. The group announced on 29 December, that they will release an upcoming song featuring Alta B. On 30 December, their single "Jump" was released, featuring Alta B and R3HAB, the music video was made in partnership with Verizon. Jump reached a milestone of 50 million views in the span of 3 weeks.

=== 2022: Wave Your Flag World Tour, Forever United, Member Changes ===
On 6 January, the group announced the launch of the #badnanehlamchallenge online dance challenge, with two winners being selected to meet with the group, winners were announced on 6 February. On 24 January, R3HAB's CYB3RPVNK radio station first heard the band's soon-to-be debut latest single "Heartbreak On The Dance Floor".On 28 January, members of the group began traveling to Dubai and Los Angeles. On 14 February, The group as a whole began their first bootcamp of 2022 in preparation for the "Wave Your Flag World Tour".

Sabina Hidalgo announced her pregnancy on 24 February, Hidalgo reassured fans that she would continue performing but would refrain from certain songs.

"Heartbreak On The Dance Floor" was officially released on 4 March. On 11 March, the group launched the Wave Your Flag Tour at Porto Alegre, Brazil with two shows. The group performed their new single "All Night Long" with Melanie serving as the main vocals. The group also performed "Jump", "Golden", "Heartbreak On The Dance Floor" and "Future Me" for the first time. The tour also shows the music video for "It's Your Birthday" before they released it on YouTube on Shivani's birthday. On 13 March the group flew to Curitiba, Brazil to perform their tour for two days. On 16 March, the group flew to Any's hometown, São Paulo, Brazil to perform their tour for three days. On 17 March, the group released the lyric video for "Dana Dana" to celebrate Holi, the video was shot during their 2020 bootcamp before the pandemic. On 27 March, the group performed in Recife, the group's last performance in Brazil as part of the tour. On 28 March, the group left Brazil and traveled to Portugal to begin preparations for the tour's performances there.

On 1 April, the group performed its first concert in Portugal in Lisbon, this marked the first time the group performed with 15 members with the addition of Joalin. On 3 April, the group performed on the talent show Got Talent Portugal. After the concerts in Lisbon and Porto in Portugal, Melanie and Bailey traveled to the Ivory Coast to shoot a secret music video there, while the others traveled back home for a break, and some members traveled to the United States and Brazil for some reasons.

After a break, the group released a music video for the single "Heartbreak On The Dancefloor" on 20 May, which was released by Vevo. On 14 June, it was announced that the group will start shooting a new musical. In June, the group released dance videos with members of The Future X, choreographed by Nicky Andersen. Pre-production of the already confirmed musical began and members of the LA began rehearsals. The group confirmed that the musical will begin filming in August.

On 6 July, VEVO, in a post on its Instagram page summing up the Top 10 music videos of the year, reached number 6 on this list with the group's single "Jump". On 27 July, the group's logo changed across all their social media platforms, resulting in TikTok, Instagram, and Twitter as well. On 5 August 2022, Sabina announced she had given birth to a healthy baby boy named Enzo, who was born on 4 August. She took a break from Now United to take care of her son and all the maternity things. On 8 August, they announced that their newest single "Like Me" would soon debut, the song was remixed by Eric Kupper. On 10 August, the single "Like Me" was released on the PRO MOTION website in a 5-minute version and a radio edit which is 3 minutes long. PRO MOTION also served as a producer on the single and music video. On 16 August, a dance video version of the group's newest single "Like Me" was released on their YouTube channel. On 17 August, filming/work began for the upcoming musical. On 19 August, the official music video for the single "Like Me" was released. The music video does not feature the version remixed by Eric Kupper.

On 22 September, the group announced that they would be touring in November, the tour has 1 Brazilian (São Paulo) and 2 Portuguese (Lisbon, Braga) stops. The tour starts as Forever United. On the same day, Any Gabrielly announced that she was going to start her solo career, therefore announcing her departure from the group. She revealed that Simon Fuller will continue to be her manager and that he will help in the search for a new Brazilian member. On 18 October, Noah Urrea announced via his Instagram profile that he was going to start his solo career, effectively announcing his departure from Now United, and Zane Carter, one of the 12 winners of the Now United Bootcampers in Abu Dhabi would replace him in representing the USA. On 19 October, the group announced that the search for the 19th member from Portugal officially started. At the end of October, the group spent 4 days in Saudi-Arabia. During this time, they filmed a music video for one of their singles in which R3HAB will once again be a co-performer. On 31 October, Now United released the music video for Mélanie's highlight song "All Night Long". The music video served as a memory of their previous tour and as an invitation to the Forever United Tour. It also had scenes shot in the studio with Mélanie and Any.

On 10 November, Josh Beauchamp announced through Instagram that he was going to start his solo career, also announcing his departure from the group. On 14 November, the group released the music video for Noah's solo "Good Intentions" which looked at the past 5 years Noah spent with the group. On 15 November, the trailer for the group's newest musical was officially released, with the performance being The Musical: Welcome to the Night of Your Life named. On 16 November, the casting of the new Brazilian member was held at the Rexona Dance Studio in São Paulo. On 19 November, the group announced on its TikTok page the 4 finalists among whom it will be decided who will represent Brazil. On 19 November, the Forever United Tour kicked off, with the group performing in São Paulo as the first stop. This was the group's first concert in a soccer stadium. During their time in Brazil, the group was invited to the TV Show The Noite com Danilo Gentili where, in addition to the "interview", they performed with the singles "All Night Long" and "Clockwork". They also gave interviews to the Brazilian MTV Hits, which was released on the Brazilian MTV YouTube channel. On 25 and 27 November, the Forever United Tour continued in Portugal, including Lisbon and then in Braga. The concerts in Portugal differed in stage appearance from those in Brazil, where various stage elements such as fire and confetti were used. In Portugal, they gave an interview to the SIC channel and performed with "All Night Long" for one of the charity shows.

On 1 December, the group's single "Clockwork" was released, which was first heard on the Brazilian TV show The Noite. Any Gabrielly posted on her Twitter page that this "Clockwork" is her last song with Now United. On 19 December, a cover of "True Love Ways" was released, sung by Zane. The music video was filmed in Portugal. On 20 December, the group notified fans in an email that the year 2023 would be the beginning of a new era. Along with that, they announced that their latest single, "Holiday," would be released on 26 December. On the same day, the group made history and "entered" the Guinness World Records under the name Most Nationalities In A Pop Group. On 26 December, the group's newest single, "Holiday", was released. With that said, in the words of the group, a new era is beginning that holds many surprises for the future.

=== 2023: New Era ===
On 9 January, some members of the group Mélanie Thomas, Savannah Clarke, Nour Ardakani, Lamar Morris, Alex Mandon Rey, Zane Carter announced that they would be moving to Los Angeles and living with the other members there. On 13 January, Bailey May announced that he would leave the group after 5 years and embark on a solo career. Bailey also revealed that he will help find the perfect successor who will represent the Philippines in the future. On 14 January, the group's new single "Odo" was released, sung by Bailey and Mélanie. The music video was filmed in 2022 after the Wave Your Flag World Tour in Côte d'Ivoire. One of the major innovations on social media platforms, especially YouTube, was the completion of The Now United Show, which was published once a week for 5 years. On 15 January, a new-style weekly series called This Week With Now United began.

On 8 February, former member Any Gabrielly announced a video on the group's social media platforms that 8 unreleased songs would soon be released due to the celebration of "OG Members". The eight songs are "Love is Love", "Cotton Candy", "Dabke", "Love Myself", "U & Me", "Find Your Fire", "It's Gonna Be Alright", "Throwback". On 9 February, a music video for "It's Gonna Be Alright" was released as a surprise on the group's YouTube channel. The music video contains memories of 2021's Camp Now United spent in Brazil. On 14 February, the next unreleased single "Love is Love" was released. The music video consists of Love, Love, Love. A Musical and its filming scenes. On 15 February, the group released the next previously unreleased song, "Cotton Candy," a song sung by some of the boy members of the group. The accompanying music video consists of the group's memories of Hawaii that happened back in 2021. On 16 February, Sina Deinert announced a video posted on the group's Instagram page that she would be away from the group this year and would focus on her own projects, but would not leave the group. On the same day, two members of the group, Savannah Clarke and Zane Carter, announced on Twitter that the group's newest musical, The Musical: Welcome to the Night of Your Life, would be released on 22 March on platform OP3N. On 17 February, the singles "It's Gonna Be Alright", "Love Is Love", "Cotton Candy" and "Throwback" were released on all music streaming platforms. On 18 February, a music video for the single "Find Your Fire" was released on the group's YouTube channel. The clip contains extra footage from the Forever United Tour of members in action and fans. On 21 February, the single "Find Your Fire" was released on all music streaming platforms. On 23 February, the next single "U & Me" was released on all music streaming platforms. On 23 February, the music video for the single "Throwback" was released. On 25 February, the next single "Love Myself" was released on all music streaming platforms. On 27 February, the music video for the single "Love Myself" was released. In a video on the group's YouTube channel, Sofya announced that she would be working on new projects and quoting her. On 28 February, the next and last unreleased single "Dabke" was released.

On 1 March, the music video for the single "U & Me" was released. Also on the same day is when Hina Yoshihara announced that she would be leaving the group to pursue a solo career. On 2 March, the group's new single was released on all music streaming platforms, "Rodeo in Tokyo". This song is Hina's "farewell song" to the group before she embarks on a solo career. On 3 March, Heyoon Jeong announced that she would be leaving Now United to pursue a solo career. Also on the same day, the music video of "I Am", lead single from The Musical: Welcome to the Night of Your Life was released on YouTube. On 4 March, Shivani Paliwal announced that she would be leaving the group too. Also on the same day, "Dabke" music video was released on YouTube. On 8 March, Joalin Loukamaa officially announced on her Instagram that she was no longer a member of the group. On 10 March, the music video for the single "Run Till Dark" was released, at the same time the music was released on all music streaming platforms. The single is co-performed by R3HAB with whom this is the group's third song together. On 21 March, the music video of the musical's second single "Welcome to the Night of Your Life" was released on YouTube, previously was released on the OP3N platform on 9 March. On 22 March, The Musical was released. On 31 March, the music video for the single "Rodeo in Tokyo" was released, shot in Portugal right after their Forever United Tour in November 2022. On 21 April, The Musical: Welcome to the Night of Your Life soundtrack was released on all streaming platforms, previously was released on the OP3N platform on 15 March. On 14 May, Now United did a blackout in all their socials. On 15 May, the group posted their new logo. On 16 May, Now United announced that the group's reality show called "Now United: New Dreams" would start on 25 May, and that it would reveal the new Brazilian member. On 18 May, Now United released the music video for "I Love Your Smile". On 1 June, it was announced that Desirée Silva would be the group's new Brazilian member. On 2 June, they posted on YouTube a Beautiful Life cover by the finalists. On 22 June, the first class from the Academy of Pop was released. On 31 July, Desirée arrived in Los Angeles to start her activities as an official member.

On 21 August, Now United announced they will perform at the Kids Choice Awards Abu Dhabi 2023. On 24 August, it was announced that the group will tour the United Kingdom as an opening act for S Club on their 2023 UK tour, which starts in October. On 31 August, Alex Mandon announced his departure from the group to start his solo career. On 16 September, Now United performed at The 2023 Kids Choice Awards in Abu Dhabi. On 19 October, the group went on tour with S Club, and they got to perform at the O2 Arena.

On 17 November, Now United released a new song called "Flex That Ego". On 25 November, they arrived in Brazil to promote the new song, which is the first song with Desirée's vocals.

=== 2024: Academy of Pop and NU Golden Memories ===
On 18 February, Now United started the series for Academy of Pop. The Academy of Pop is a global performing arts platform designed to nurture and train young talent in singing, dancing, and performance. It serves as both a digital and physical space where aspiring artists can learn from professionals and collaborate with peers.

On 15 March: Release of the single "Pata Pata (Afro Remix)."

On 27 October, Now United started a series for NU Golden Memories. NU Golden Memory is a weekly episode series where Now United members reminisce about their tours and experiences throughout the years. Each episode highlights special behind-the-scenes moments, unforgettable performances, and personal memories that celebrate the group's global journey and friendship.

=== 2025: Now Or Never World Tour ===
On 4 February, Melanie announced that she will be leaving the group and pursue her solo career.

On 5 February, Now United posted a video on their Youtube channel announcing that the group was about to enter a new era, including new and old members.

On 27 April, the group announced they would go on tour with members Savannah, Nour, Desirée, Sina, and Shivani, along with several former members. It was also revealed that new members would be added to the group. Tour locations include Brazil, Portugal, Hong Kong, Saudi Arabia, and others to be announced. On 3 May, the addition of the group's 19th member was teased. On 4 May, Rachel Manurung was officially announced as the 19th member, representing Indonesia.

On 8 May, Any, through the group’s official Instagram account, announced that auditions had opened for a new member from Portugal, who would also join the tour. On 9 May, Bailey confirmed via the group’s Instagram that he would join the tour. On 10 May, Krystian announced via the group’s Instagram that auditions were opening for a new member from Hong Kong, China. He also announced the group's partnership with The Hong Kong Jockey Club. On 14 May, Sofya confirmed via the group’s Instagram that she would join the tour.

On 16 May, the addition of the group's new member was teased. On 18 May, Jayna, initially a temporary member, was officially announced as the new representative of the Philippines, succeeding Bailey. With this update, the Philippines will have two Filipino members joining the Reunion Tour.

On 12 July, Diarra announced via the group’s Instagram that she would join the tour. On 21 July, Now United announced its partnership with Escape Hotel BR, featuring a limited-time group-themed room. The storyline revolves around the kidnapping of the Brazilian member Desirée, who is captured by an android and locked in the "Tokyo 2049" room. Fans must solve the clues to free Desirée before the group’s show begins.

On 27 July, Krystian shared a sneak peek of the audition for the new member from Hong Kong, China, and announced that he would join the tour.

On 28 July, Now United announced that Sabina would be joining them on tour, and they also announced via their YouTube channel, and other social media sites, the dates for their upcoming tour. The tour, being called "The Now or Never World Tour", will begin in Portugal. On 29 July, Now United announced via the group’s Instagram that Hina would join the tour.

On 7 August, Desirée, Jayna, Savannah, Nour and Rachel arrived in Hong Kong, China to start the activities of the new era. On 16 August to 19 August, other members arrived in Hong Kong, China. On 28 August, Ariel Tsang was officially announced as the new member, representing Hong Kong, China via The Hong Kong Jockey Club press conference.

On September 25, Now United released the music video for their newest single Beautiful World. On 6 October, Mélanie surprised the group and announced that she would join the tour. On 11 October, the group teased their new song "Giddy Up". On 18 October, Josh announced via the group’s Instagram that he would join the tour. On 21 October, the group announced that Luke Brown, member of Academy of Pop, would join temporarily for the tour. On 25 October, Now United performed their new song "Now or Never" in their performance at Wine and Dine Festival 2025. On October 30, Now United released the music video for their newest single Giddy Up.

2026:

On September 17, 2026, Nour Ardakani announced her departure from Now United to pursue a solo career.

== Public image and reception ==
Now United has been perceived as a response from North American music managers in reaction to the rising global popularity of K-pop. Much of Now United's popularity is based in Latin America, where most of its streams and views come from. In a more critical article, BBC music correspondent, Mark Savage stated that the group have not yet troubled the charts and do not have the impact that Fuller's other clients have had.

In addition to singing, the group is known to perform elaborate and synchronized choreography. Fan interaction between the members and their fanbase has been seen as a factor behind their success, with the content being produced and released on a daily basis. The group has since gained over 130 million followers across online platforms and over 2.7 billion views on their YouTube channel.

== Other ventures ==
=== Endorsements ===
Now United's status as one of Brazil's most popular music acts, their large fanbase, and social media following have made them attractive to large corporate brands including Pepsi, Forever 21, and KitKat. Now United is the official dance partner of Rexona Brazil, they have filmed several commercials for the brand and have released limited edition products. The group signed with Brazilian licensing agency, Redibra in 2021 which aims to offer exclusive products in the Brazilian market. In January 2019, the group signed a global sponsorship deal with Pepsi. In April 2021, the group teamed up with KitKat to launch a special edition KitKat Bar, which was sold exclusively in Brazil. Since December 2021, the group have partnered with record label Vevo for the promotion of their music videos.

== Members ==
=== Representation ===
Now United is a global pop group where each member represents a different country from around the world. The group operates on a rotational system, allowing members to be active, inactive, or return temporarily for specific projects or tours. While some have left to pursue solo careers, they remain part of the group’s legacy. This dynamic structure also allows for new members to join, representation to be passed on to a new generation, and the inclusion of temporary or unofficial members when needed.

Countries with Member Representation (Past, Present & Future)

=== Member list ===
Representation		Member	
No.	Country	Name	Debut
1	Senegal	Diarra Sylla	2017^{b}^{f}
2	United Kingdom	Lamar Morris	2017^{b}
3	Mexico	Sabina Hidalgo	2017^{b}^{f}
4	India	Shivani Paliwal	2017^{b}^{f}
5	Russia	Sofya Plotnikova	2017^{b}^{f}
6	Brazil	Any Gabrielly	2017^{b}
6	Brazil	Desirée Silva	2023^{a}^{d}
7	United States	Noah Urrea	2017^{b}
7	United States	Zane Carter	2022^{b}^{d}
7	United States	Luke Brown	2025^{h}
8	China	Krystian Wang	2017^{b}^{f}
8	Hong Kong	Ariel Tsang	2025^{a}^{d}
9	Philippines	Bailey May	2017^{b}^{f}
9	Philippines	Jayna Hughes	2023^{e}/2025^{a}
10	Japan	Hina Yoshihara	2017^{b}^{f}
11	South Korea	Heyoon Jeong	2017^{b}
12	Germany	Sina Deinert	2017^{b}^{f}
13	Finland	Joalin Loukamaa	2017^{b}
14	Canada	Josh Beauchamp	2017^{b}^{f}
15	Australia	Savannah Clarke	2020^{a}
16	Lebanon	Nour Ardakani	2020^{b}
17	Ivory Coast	Mélanie Thomas	2020^{b}^{f}
18	Spain	Alex Mandon Rey	2021^{b}
19	Indonesia	Rachel Manurung	2025^{a}
20	Portugal	TBD	2026^{g}
Additional Notes^a Member is currently active.^b Member left or currently inactive.^d Member is a successor of a past member from the same country/region.^e Member who joined temporarily but now an active/successor member.^f Past Member will join temporarily for tour/event.^g Upcoming member.^h Temporary member, joining for tour/event.

== Discography ==
=== Soundtrack album ===
Title
The Musical: Welcome to the Night of Your Life
(with Lilith Freund)
Details
- Released: 21 April 2023
- Label: XIX Entertainment
- Format: Digital download, streaming
Notes
Track listing
- Standard edition
  No.	Title	Length
  1.	"Welcome to the Night of Your Life"	2:17
  2.	"Yeah!"	2:19
  3.	"I Am"	3:02
  4.	"New York Star"	2:52
  5.	"That Should Be Me"	1:51
  6.	"Ruin the Friendship"	2:42
  7.	"Remember Us"	2:37
  8.	"Bravo"	3:00
  9.	"These Are the Days"	2:36
  10.	"New York Star (Reprise)"	1:28
  11.	"Never Lose the Feeling"	3:03
  12.	"Say Goodbye"	2:43
  13.	"Reach"	3:52
  Total length:		34:29

=== Singles ===
==== As lead artist ====
List of singles as lead artist, showing year released
Year	Title	Album
2017	"Summer in the City"	Non-album singles
2018	"What Are We Waiting For"	Non-album singles
2018	"Who Would Think That Love?"	Non-album singles
2018	"All Day"	Non-album singles
2018	"How We Do It" (featuring Badshah)	Non-album singles
2019	"Beautiful Life"	Non-album singles
2019	"Afraid of Letting Go"	Non-album singles
2019	"Paraná"	Non-album singles
2019	"Sunday Morning"	Non-album singles
2019	"Crazy Stupid Silly Love"	Non-album singles
2019	"Like That"	Non-album singles
2019	"You Give Me Something"	Non-album singles
2019	"Legends"	Non-album singles
2019	"Na Na Na"	Non-album singles
2019	"Let Me Be the One"	Non-album singles
2020	"Live This Moment"	Non-album singles
2020	"Come Together"	Non-album singles
2020	"Wake Up"	Non-album singles
2020	"Hoops"	Non-album singles
2020	"By My Side"	Non-album singles
2020	"Better"	Non-album singles
2020	"Dana Dana"	Non-album singles
2020	"Let the Music Move You"	Non-album singles
2020	"Stand Together"	Non-album singles
2020	"Show You How to Love"	Non-album singles
2020	"Nobody Fools Me Twice"	Non-album singles
2020	"Feel It Now"	Non-album singles
2020	"The Weekend's Here"	Non-album singles
2020	"Somebody"	Non-album singles
2020	"Paradise"	Non-album singles
2020	"Chained Up"	Non-album singles
2020	"Habibi"	Non-album singles
2020	"Golden"	Non-album singles
2020	"One Love" (with R3hab)	Non-album singles
2020	"Pas Le Choix" (Manal Mix)	Non-album singles
2020	"Hewale"	Non-album singles
2021	"How Far We've Come"	Non-album singles
2021	"Lean on Me"	Non-album singles
2021	"All Around the World"	Non-album singles
2021	"Turn It Up"	Non-album singles
2021	"Fiesta"	Non-album singles
2021	"Baila"	Non-album singles
2021	"Nobody Like Us"	Non-album singles
2021	"NU Party"	Non-album singles
2021	"Wave Your Flag"	Non-album singles
2021	"When You Love Somebody"	Non-album singles
2021	"Dance Like That"	Non-album singles
2021	"Momento"	Non-album singles
2021	"Ikou"	Non-album singles
2021	"I Got You"	Non-album singles
2021	"Anything for You"	Non-album singles
2021	"Future Me"	Non-album singles
2021	"Badna Nehlam"	Non-album singles
2021	"Jump" (featuring Alta B)	Non-album singles
2022	"Heartbreak on the Dancefloor"	Non-album singles
2022	"It's Your Birthday"	Non-album singles
2022	"Like Me"	Non-album singles
2022	"All Night Long"	Non-album singles
2022	"Good Intentions"	Non-album singles
2022	"Clockwork"	Non-album singles
2022	"True Love Ways"	Non-album singles
2022	"Holiday"	Non-album singles
2023	"Odo"	Non-album singles
2023	"It's Gonna Be Alright"	Non-album singles
2023	"Love Is Love"	Non-album singles
2023	"Cotton Candy"	Non-album singles
2023	"Throwback"	Non-album singles
2023	"Find Your Fire"	Non-album singles
2023	"U & Me"	Non-album singles
2023	"Love Myself"	Non-album singles
2023	"Dabke"	Non-album singles
2023	"I Am"	The Musical: Welcome to the Night of Your Life
2023	"Welcome to the Night of Your Life" (with Lilith Freund)	The Musical: Welcome to the Night of Your Life
2023	"Rodeo in Tokyo"	Non-album singles
2023	"Run Till Dark" (with R3hab)	Non-album singles
2023	"I Love Your Smile"	Non-album singles
2023	"Flex That Ego"	Non-album singles
2024	"Pata Pata" (Afro Remix)	Non-album singles
2025	"Beautiful World"	Non-album singles
2025	"Giddy Up"	Non-album singles

==== Jingles and covers ====
Year	Title	Album
2019	"Sundin Ang Puso" (with Pepsi)	Non-album singles
2020	"Winter Wonderland"	Non-album singles
2020	"Sleigh Ride"	Non-album singles

==== As featured artist ====
List of singles as a featured artist, showing year released
Year	Title	Album
2018	"One World" (RedOne and Adelina featuring Now United)	Non-album single

==== Alternate version singles ====
List of translated singles, acoustic versions, showing year released
Year	Title	Album
2019	"How We Do It" (solo version with verses in Portuguese, Spanish and Mandarin)	Non-album singles
2019	"For the Love of It" ("Sundin Ang Puso" English version)	Non-album singles
2019	"Lendas" ("Legends" Portuguese version)	Non-album singles
2020	"Na Na Na" (Spanish version)	Non-album singles
2020	"حبيبي" ("Habibi" Arabic version)	Non-album singles
2023	"Run Till Dark" (with R3hab; acoustic version)	Non-album singles

=== Remixes ===
List of remixes, showing year released
Year	Title	Album
2022	"Like Me" (Eric Kupper Radio Remix)	Non-album singles
2023	"Holiday" (Skytech Remix)	Non-album singles
2023	"Run Till Dark" (with R3hab; Arcando Remix)	Non-album singles
2023	"Run Till Dark" (with R3hab; Carta & Willim Remix)	Non-album singles

== Filmography ==
=== Music videos ===
	Title	Location	Note
As lead artist
2018	"Summer in the City"	El Mirage Lake and downtown Los Angeles, California, and home countries	El Mirage Lake, downtown Los Angeles
2018	"What Are We Waiting For"	Seoul, South Korea	Seoul's streets and pub
2018	"Who Would Think That Love?"	Puebla, Mexico	Puebla's streets and tower
2018	"All Day"	Seal Beach, California, U.S.	Seal Beach
2018	"How We Do It" (featuring Badshah)	Mumbai, India	Mumbai's streets
2019	"Beautiful Life"	Shillong, India	Waterfall Shillong
2019	"Afraid of Letting Go"	Manila, Philippines	Streets of Intramuros and campus premises of Letran
2019	"Sundin Ang Puso"	Manila, Philippines	Manila's streets
2019	"Paraná"	São Paulo, Brazil	Rexona Dance Studio in São Paulo
2019	"Sunday Morning"	California, U.S.	California's streets
2019	"Crazy Stupid Silly Love"	Las Vegas, Nevada, U.S.	A villa in Las Vegas
2019	"Like That"	Portland, Oregon, U.S.	A farm in Oregon
2019	"For the Love of It"	Portland, Oregon, U.S.	A farm in Oregon
2019	"You Give Me Something"	West Hollywood, California, U.S.	XIX Entertainment Building and West Hollywood streets
2019	"Legends"	YouTube Studios World Tour - various countries	Rio de Janeiro and other locations
2019	"Na Na Na"	Rio de Janeiro, Brazil	Historic Theatro Municipal of Rio de Janeiro
2019	"Let Me Be the One"	Recap from 2019 Travels - various Countries/Tour Brazil	Various locations
2020	"Live This Moment"	Los Angeles, California, U.S.	A studio in Los Angeles
2020	"Come Together"	Barstow, California, U.S.	Coyote Lake
2020	"Hoops"	Los Angeles, California, U.S.	A studio in Los Angeles
2020	"Wake Up"	Orange County, California, U.S.	A restaurant and disco in Orange County and Noah's home
2020	"By My Side"	Home countries	Various locations
2020	"Better"	Flashback Early Days - Los Angeles, California, U.S.	A studio in Los Angeles
2020	"Dana Dana"	Home countries	Various locations
2020	"Let the Music Move You" (Animated Video)	Zepeto avatars of members	Animation studio
2020	"Stand Together"	Home countries	Various locations
2020	"Nobody Fools Me Twice"	Los Angeles, California, U.S.	Heyoon's apartment in Los Angeles
2020	"Feel It Now"	Home countries	Various locations
2020	"Na Na Na" (Spanish version)	Rio de Janeiro, Brazil	Historic Theatro Municipal of Rio de Janeiro
2020	"The Weekend's Here"	Dubai, UAE	Paramount Hotel in Dubai
2020	"Somebody"	Dubai, UAE	Paramount Hotel in Dubai
2020	"Chained Up"	Dubai, UAE	Paramount Hotel in Dubai
2020	"Habibi"	Beirut, Lebanon and Dubai, UAE	Beirut's streets and beach and Dubai's old town
2020	"Golden"	Dubai, UAE	Desert in Dubai and Atlantis the Palm's aquarium and pool
2020	"One Love" (with R3hab)	Dubai, UAE	La Perle Dubai
2020	"Paradise"	Abu Dhabi, UAE	A studio in Abu Dhabi
2020	"Pas Le Choix" (Manal Mix)	Dubai, UAE	A studio in Dubai
2020	"Winter Wonderland"	Dubai, UAE	A studio in Dubai
2020	"Hewale"	Malibu, California, U.S.	Malibu's beach
2021	"How Far We've Come"	Abu Dhabi, UAE	Desert in Abu Dhabi and twofour54 backlot
2021	"Lean on Me"	Abu Dhabi, UAE	Emirates Palace Hotel in Abu Dhabi
2021	"All Around the World"	Home countries	Various locations
2021	"Paradise" (Mexico Memories)	Cancún, Mexico	Riviera Maya's beach
2021	"Turn It Up"	Cancún, Mexico	Riviera Maya's beach and Tulum
2021	"Fiesta"	Cancún, Mexico	Riviera Maya and a Belmond Hotel
2021	"Baila"	Solage, California, U.S.	A farm in San Luis Obispo
2021	"Let the Music Move You"	Kona, Hawaii	A villa in Hawaii/The Big Island
2021	"Show You How to Love"	Malibu, California, U.S.	A villa's park in Malibu
2021	"Nobody Like Us"	Kona, Hawaii	Hawaiian volcano
2021	"NU Party"	Malibu, California, U.S.	A villa in Malibu
2021	"Wave Your Flag"	Abu Dhabi, UAE	Louvre in Abu Dhabi
2021	"Ikou"	Riviera Maya, Mexico	Xcaret in Riviera Maya
2021	"Dance Like That"	Solage, California, U.S.	A farm in San Luis Obispo
2021	"Momento"	Solage, California, U.S.	A farm in San Luis Obispo
2021	"I Got You" (Boys vs. Girls)	Lisbon, Portugal	Lisbon's streets
2021	"Anything for You" (Boys vs. Girls)	Lisbon, Portugal	Lisbon's streets
2021	"When You Love Somebody"	Solage, California, U.S.	A farm in San Luis Obispo
2021	"Future Me"	Abu Dhabi, UAE	Warner Bros Studio in Abu Dhabi
2021	"Badna Nehlam"	Abu Dhabi, UAE	W Hotel in Abu Dhabi
2021	"Jump" (featuring Alta B)	Lisbon, Portugal	In the warehouse containers on the quayside in LisbonWe
2022	"It's Your Birthday"	Various countries	Various locations
2022	"Heartbreak on the Dance Floor"	Rio de Janeiro, Brazil	In a disco and on a street in Rio de Janeiro
2022	"Like Me" (Eric Kupper Radio Remix) (Dance video)	Los Angeles, California, U.S.	Rexona Dance Studio in Los Angeles
2022	"Like Me"	Los Angeles, California, U.S.	Rexona Dance Studio in Los Angeles
2022	"All Night Long"	Wave Your Flag World Tour - various countries	Recorded during the Wave Your Flag Tour
2022	"Good Intentions"	Los Angeles, California, U.S.	The Shed, Van Nuys and NRG Studios North Hollywood, CA.
2022	"Clockwork"	Rio de Janeiro, Brazil	Vidigal Favela
2022	"True Love Ways"	Lisbon, Portugal	Lisbon's streets
2022	"Holiday"	Lisbon, Portugal	Lisbon's streets
2023	"Odo"	Abidjan, Ivory Coast	Various locations
2023	"It's Gonna Be Alright" (Throwback video)	Paraty, Brazil	Various locations
2023	"Love is Love" (Throwback video)	San Luis Obispo, California, U.S.	A farm in San Luis Obispo
2023	"Cotton Candy" (Throwback video)	Nīnole, Hawaii, U.S.	Various locations
2023	"Find Your Fire" (Throwback video)	Forever United Tour - various countrie	Various locations
2023	"Throwback" (Throwback video)	Quintana Roo, Mexico	Various locations
2023	"Love Myself" (Dance video)	Los Angeles, California, U.S.	A studio in Los Angeles
2023	"U & Me" (Throwback video)	Manila, Philippines	Various locations
2023	"I Am"	Los Angeles, California, U.S.	A studio in Los Angeles
2023	"Dabke" (Throwback video)	Various countries	Various locations
2023	"Holiday" (Skytech Remix) (Dance video)	Los Angeles, California, U.S.	A studio in Los Angeles
2023	"Run Till Dark" (with R3hab)	Alula, Saudi Arabia	Various locations in Saudi Arabia
2023	"Welcome to the Night of Your Life" (with Lilith Freund)	Los Angeles, California, U.S.	A studio in Los Angeles
2023	"Rodeo in Tokyo"	Lisbon, Portugal	A studio in Lisbon
2023	"Run Till Dark" (Carta & Willim Remix) (Dance video) (with R3hab)	Los Angeles, California, U.S.	A studio in Los Angeles
2023	"I Love Your Smile"	Los Angeles, California, U.S.	Los Angeles streets
2025	"Beautiful World"	Hong Kong, China	Various locations
2025	"Giddy Up"	Hong Kong, China	The Happy Valley Racecourse
As featured artist
2018	"One World" (with RedOne and Adelina)	Moscow, Russia	Moscow's streets

=== Notes ===
- ^{^[a]}#Clips: United States (Hawaii), Brazil, Philippines, South Korea, Japan, China, Mexico, United Arab Emirates, India, Lebanon.
- ^{^[b]}There is a live acoustic version
- ^{^[c]} #Home: France, England, India, Japan, Brazil, United States, Russia, Mexico, Senegal, Philippines, South Korea, Finland, Germany, Spain, Lebanon, Ivory Coast and Australia.
- ^{^[d]} Based in the United States and old images recorded in other countries.
- ^{^[e]} Now unavailable.
- ^{^[f]} #Concerts: Australia, Brazil, Canada, China, Finland, Germany, India, Japan, Mexico, Russia, Senegal, South Korea, United States, Sweden, Austria, Russia.

=== Films ===
Year	Title	Notes
2021	Love, Love, Love. A Musical	Short film
2023	The Musical: Welcome to the Night of Your Life	Musical

=== Online shows ===
Year	Title	Platform	Episodes	Notes	Ref.
2018	Now United - Meet the Group	YouTube	1	Special	
2018	Now United - Singing and Dancing Without Music	YouTube	14	Special	
2018	Now United in Moscow, Russia	YouTube	6	Vlog	
2018	Now United in Kitzbüel, Austria	YouTube	2	Vlog	
2018	We Are Now United / This Is Me	YouTube	Launching	Special on the personal life of the members	
2018	Now United - Why I Dance x Rexona Dance Studio	YouTube	Launching	Special with Rexona Dance Studio	
2018	Dreams Come True: The Documentary	YouTube	1	Documentary	
2018–2022	The Now United Show	YouTube	Season 1 – 25; Season 2 – 44; Season 3 – 46; Season 4 – 52; Season 5 – 51	Backstage of the world tour, shows and rehearsals. 5 seasons and counting	
2018–2022	Meet...from...	YouTube	17	Special	
2019	The Road to Dreams Come True	YouTube	20	Backstage in preparation for Dreams Come True Tour	
2020	Dance Parties	YouTube	4	Live made by members during the COVID-19 pandemic	
2020	Now United Cartoons	YouTube	4	Animated Cartoon	
2023	This Week With Now United	YouTube	11	New weekly backstage series	

== Tours ==
=== Headlining ===
==== Dreams Come True Tour (2019) ====
Date	City	Country	Venue
South America
17 November	Belo Horizonte	Brazil	Befly Hall
20 November	São Paulo	Brazil	Vibra São Paulo
22 November	Curitiba	Brazil	Teatro Positivo
24 November	Rio de Janeiro	Brazil	Vivo Rio

==== Wave Your Flag World Tour (2022) ====
Date)	City	Country	Venue
South America & Europe
11 March	Porto Alegre	Brazil	Araújo Vianna Auditorium
12 March	Porto Alegre	Brazil	Araújo Vianna Auditorium
15 March	Curitiba	Brazil	Viasoft Experience
16 March	Curitiba	Brazil	Viasoft Experience
18 March	São Paulo	Brazil	Ibirapuera Gymnasium
19 March	São Paulo	Brazil	Ibirapuera Gymnasium
20 March	São Paulo	Brazil	Ibirapuera Gymnasium
22 March	Brasília	Brazil	Nilson Nelson Gymnasium
24 March	Río de Janeiro	Brazil	Farmasi Arena
26 March	Recife	Brazil	Classic Hall
27 March	Recife	Brazil	Classic Hall
1 April	Lisbon	Portugal	MEO Arena
2 April	Porto	Portugal	Super Bock Arena

==== Forever United Tour (2022) ====
.
Date	City	Country	Venue
South America & Europe
19 November	São Paulo	Brazil	Allianz Parque
25 November	Lisbon	Portugal	MEO Arena
27 November	Braga	Portugal	Forum Braga

==== The Now or Never World Tour (2025) ====
Date	City	Country	Venue
Europe, South America & Asia
5 November	Lisbon	Portugal	Sagres Campo Pequeno
7 November	Porto	Portugal	Super Bock Arena
11 November	Porto Alegre	Brazil	Auditório Araújo Vianna
12 November	Curitiba	Brazil	Teatro Positivo
14 November	São Paulo	Brazil	Vibra São Paulo
15 November	São Paulo	Brazil	Vibra São Paulo
19 November	Río de Janeiro	Brazil	Vivo Rio
20 November	Belo Horizonte	Brazil	BeFly Arena
25 November	Recife	Brazil	Classic Hall
10 December	Hong Kong		Sha Tin Racecourse
14 December	Hong Kong		Sha Tin Racecourse

=== Promotional ===
==== Promo World Tour (2018) ====
Date	City	Country	Venue
Europe, North America, Africa, Asia & South America
20 April	Moscow	Russia	The Voice Kids Russia
22 April	Moscow	Russia	XAPA-KIDS Festival
23 April	Moscow	Russia	Evening Urgant
24 April	Moscow	Russia	Prospekt Mira Station
2 June	Kitzbühel	Austria	Schloss Kaps Park
5 June	Orlando	United States	SAP Sapphire Now
17 June	Berlin	Germany	Berlin Fanmeile
18 June	Helsinki	Finland	Seiska Magazine Interview
21 June	Helsinki	Finland	
24 June	Stockholm	Sweden	
25 June	Gothenburg	Sweden	Lotta På Liseberg
26 June	Manchester	England	Blue Peter
27 June	Manchester	England	Blue Peter
28 June	Manchester	England	Blue Peter
30 June	Dakar	Senegal	Youssou Ndour CICES
2 July	Dakar	Senegal	Magic Land Dakar
12 July	Seoul	Korea	Unknown
16 July	Tokyo	Japan	Harajuku
21 July	Manila	Philippines	MOR Pinoy Music Awards
24 July	Culver City	United States	Westfield Culver City
26 July	Los Angeles	United States	The Late Late Show with James Corden
4 August	Shenzen	China	Hoops for Hope: Jeremy Lin 2nd All-Star Game
6 August	Beijing	China	Unknown
12 August	Shanghai	China	Shake It Up
27-28 August	Puebla	Mexico	WWTTL Music Video Shoot
31 August	Mexico City	Mexico	TODAY
10 September	Los Angeles	United States	So You Think You Can Dance
25 October	Mumbai	India	Unknown
5 November	São Paolo	Brazil	Raxona Dance Studio
14 November	Ottawa	Canada	Canadian Tire Centre (We Day Ottawa 2018)
26 November	Delhi	India	Vogue India Interview + Facebook Live
27-28 November	Mumbai	India	‘HWDI’ Music Video Shoot
2 December	Agra	India	
5 December	Jaipur	India	
17 December	Mumbai	India	MTV India

==== World Tour 2019 Presented by YouTube Music (2019) ====
Date	City	Country	Venue
Europe, Asia, South America & North America
26 September	Paris	France	YouTube Space Paris
27 September	London	England	YouTube Space London
29 September	Dubai	UAE	YouTube Space Dubai
30 September	Dubai	UAE	YouTube Space Dubai
1 October	Dubai	UAE	YouTube Space Dubai
3 October	Mumbai	India	YouTube Space Mumbai
4 October	Mumbai	India	YouTube Space Mumbai
5 October	Tokyo	Japan	YouTube Space Tokyo
6 October	Tokyo	Japan	YouTube Space Tokyo
11 October	Rio de Janeiro	Brazil	YouTube Space Rio de Janeiro
25 October	Los Angeles	United States	YouTube Space LA

=== Livestream concert ===
- Now Love Live From Abu Dhabi (2021)

=== Opening acts ===
- S Club – The Good Times Tour (2023)

=== Cancelled ===
- Come Together Tour (2020)

== Awards and nominations ==
Awards and nominations received by Now United
Year	Award	Category	Work nominated	Result	Ref.
2019	Meus Prêmios Nick	Favorite International Artist	Now United	Nominated	
2019	Meus Prêmios Nick	Fandom of the Year	Now United	Won	
2019	Prêmio Jovem Brasileiro	K-Pop rookie of the Year	Now United	Won	
2019	Prêmio Contigo! Online	International newcomer	Now United	Won	
2020	Kids' Choice Awards	Brazilian Fandom	Now United	Won	
2020	Prêmio Jovem Brasileiro	Bombastic Music Video	"Come Together"	Nominated	
2020	Meus Prêmios Nick	International Hit	"Come Together"	Won	
2020	Meus Prêmios Nick	Fandom of the Year	Now United	Won	
2020	Meus Prêmios Nick	Favorite International Artist	Now United	Won	
2020	Meus Prêmios Nick	Epic KCA Winners	Now United	Won	
2020	MTV Video Music Awards	Best Group	Now United	Nominated	
2020	Kids Choice Awards Mexico	Worldwide Hit	"Come Together"	Nominated	
2020	Capricho Awards	International Hit	"Come Together"	Won	
2020	Capricho Awards	International group	Now United		
2020	Capricho Awards	International group	Now United	Won	
2020	Prêmio Todateen	Group of the year	Now United	Nominated	
2020	Prêmio Todateen	International hit	"Come Together"	Won	
2021	Kids' Choice Awards	Favourite Global Music Star	Savannah Clarke	Nominated	
2021	Kids' Choice Awards Australia	Aussie/Kiwi Legend of the Year	Savannah Clarke	Won	
2021	Kids' Choice Awards Brasil	Brazilian Fandom	Now United	Won	
2021	Murex D'or Award	Best Arabic Song	"حبيبي" (Habibi in Arabic)	Nominated	
2021	Murex D'or Award	2021 Murex D'or Audience	Nour Ardakani	Nominated	
2021	Flame Roem World Awards 2021	Pop group of the year	Now United	Nominated	
2021	Meus Prêmios Nick	Brilliant Creator	Any Gabrielly	Nominated	
2021	Meus Prêmios Nick	International hit of the year	"Lean On Me"	Nominated	
2021	Meus Prêmios Nick	Music video of the year	"Lean On Me"	Nominated	
2021	Meus Prêmios Nick	Fandom of the year	Uniters	Nominated	
2021	Meus Prêmios Nick	Favorite musical group	Now United	Nominated	
2021	Arab Women Awards	Young Talent Award	Nour Ardakani	Won	
2021	Channel R Radio Awards	Best New Artist	Now United	Nominated	
2021	Acervo Music Awards	Song of the year	"Wave Your Flag"	Won	
2022	Kids' Choice Awards Australia	Aussie/Kiwi Legend of The Year	Savannah Clarke	Won	
2022	Acervo Music Awards	Collab of the year	"Jump" ft. Alta B	Won	
2022	Acervo Music Awards	Global Social Artist	Now United	Won	
2022	Acervo Music Awards	Pop Act of the Year	Now United	Won	
2022	Damebe	Best Team	Now United	Won	
