= XIX Entertainment =

American entertainment company

- Type: Private
- Industry: Entertainment
- Founded: 2010
- Headquarters: London, England
- Key people: Simon Fuller
- Products: Artist management Film and television production Creative services
- Owner: Simon Fuller
- Website: xixentertainment.com

XIX Entertainment is a British entertainment content and intellectual rights organization based in London. The company, which has been valued at $100 million was set up by Simon Fuller in 2010 to commercially develop world class individuals and entertainment properties. The company owns several high value partnerships in tech and media including an innovative 5G venture with Verizon, an international educational initiative with Pearson PLC, a new talent platform with TikTok parent company ByteDance as well as owning shareholdings in various other entertainment and fashion properties.

XIX Entertainment provides artist services that include management, television and music production, social media engagement, Public Relations, entertainment marketing, legal and accounting services, and has a staff of fifty with offices in London, New York, Los Angeles and Nashville.

The company manages or has managed Now United, Any Gabrielly, The Future X, Annie Lennox, Victoria Beckham, David Beckham, Andy Murray, Steven Tyler, Carrie Underwood, The Spice Girls, Aloe Blacc, Lisa Marie Presley and others.
