= The Voice Brasil season 12 =

The Voice Brasil
- Season 12
- Hosted by: Fátima Bernardes
- Coaches: Carlinhos Brown; Michel Teló; Iza; Lulu Santos
- No. of contestants: 40 artists
- Winner: Ivan Barreto
- Winning coach: Lulu Santos
- Runners-up: Amanda Maria; Jhonny; Thais Ribeiro

Release
- Original network: TV Globo; Multishow
- Original release: November 28 – December 28, 2023

Season chronology
- ← Previous; Season 11 Next → Season 13

The twelfth season of The Voice Brasil, premiered on TV Globo on Tuesday, November 28, 2023, in the 10:30 / 9:30 p.m. (BRT / AMT) slot, immediately following the primetime telenovela Terra e Paixão. On August 28, 2023, TV Globo announced that this season would be the last produced by the network, a move widely believed to mark the end of franchise.

Fátima Bernardes returned for her second season as the host, while Thaís Fersoza did not return as the backstage correspondent with Fátima assuming the roles for both.

Lulu Santos, Michel Teló and Iza returned for their twelfth, ninth and fifth season as coaches, respectively, while Gaby Amarantos was replaced by returning coach Carlinhos Brown on his tenth season in the regular series.

Former The Voice Brasil coaches also return for the farewell season as special guests. During the blind auditions phase, Mumuzinho took turns with Iza in the coaches' chair and help her form her team. Fafá de Belém sang "De Quem É A Culpa" by Marília Mendonça, behind the red curtains, as a secret performer during the second episode; Daniel performed "Estou Apaixonado" at the end of the same episode. On the third episode, Claudia Leitte debuted her new single "Liquitiqui"; Gaby Amarantos and Toni Garrido appeared on the sixth, seventh and eighth episodes as the Battle advisors.

The season introduced the All-Star twist, where former contestants from past seasons were able to return and compete for a second chance to win.

On December 28, 2023, Ivan Barreto from Team Lulu won the competition with 35.75% of the public vote over Amanda Maria (Team Brown), Jhonny (Team Teló) and Thais Ribeiro (Team Iza), marking Lulu Santos' second victory as a coach. In addition to Barreto's win, Santos became only the second coach after Michel Teló to win the show multiple times.

On April 15, 2025, a new season of The Voice Brasil produced by SBT and Disney+ was officially confirmed by Daniela Beyruti, CEO of SBT. Subsequently, on July 18, the network formally announced the partnership, confirming Tiago Leifert's return as host, with filming commencing on September 1 and premiering on October 6, 2025.

== Coaches and hosts ==
Coaches and Host of The Voice Brasil Season 12

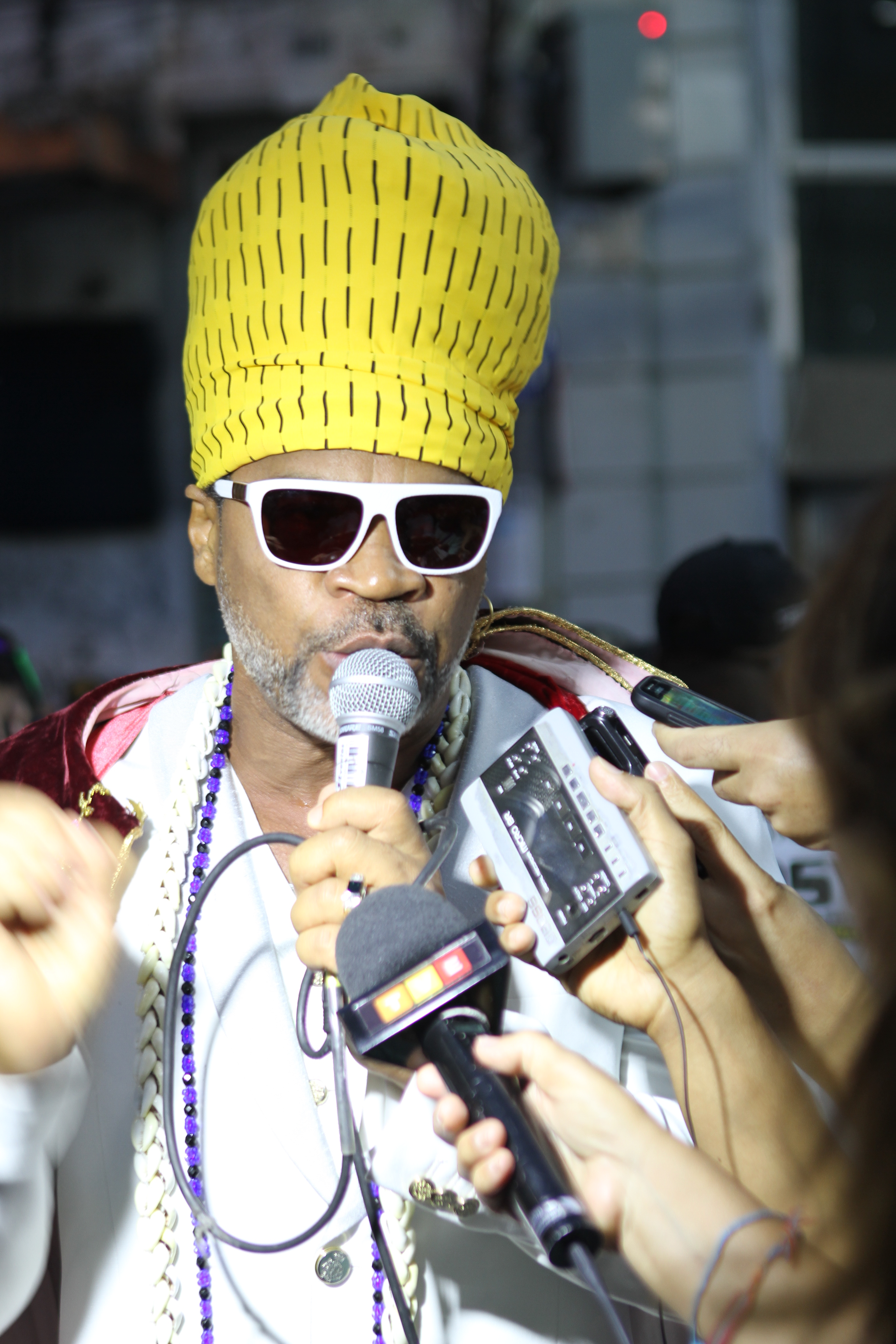
Carlinhos Brown

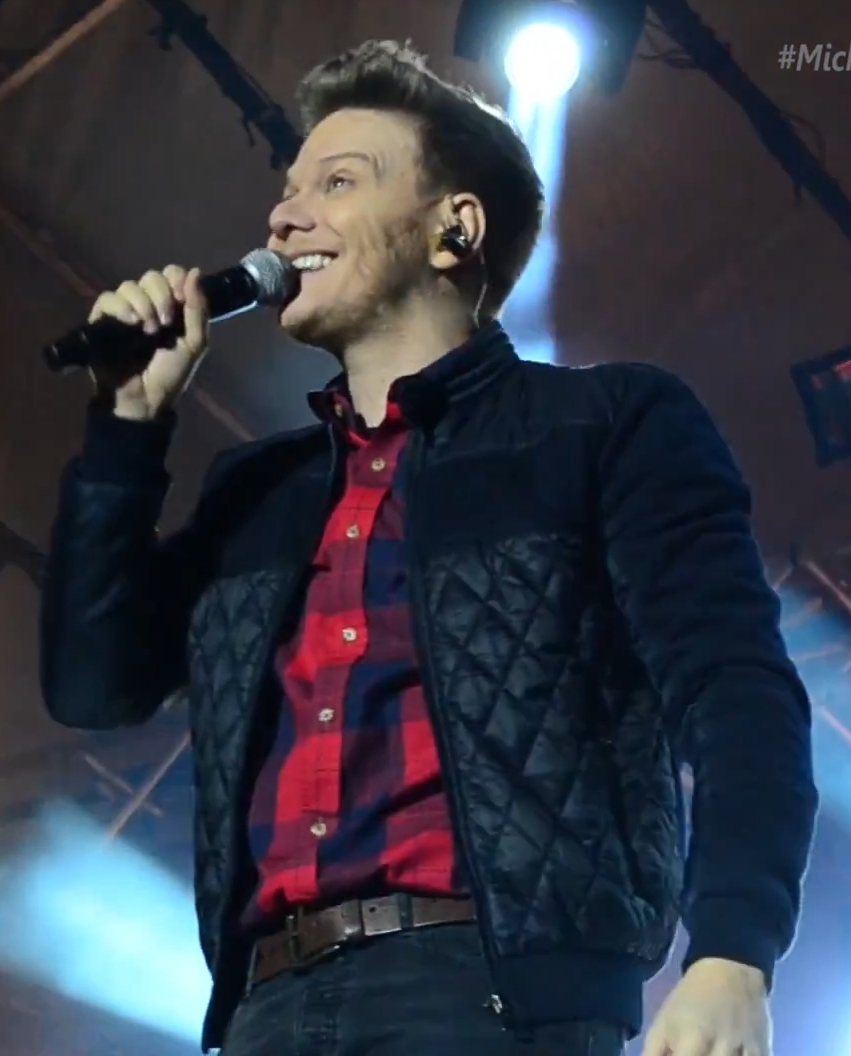
Michel Teló

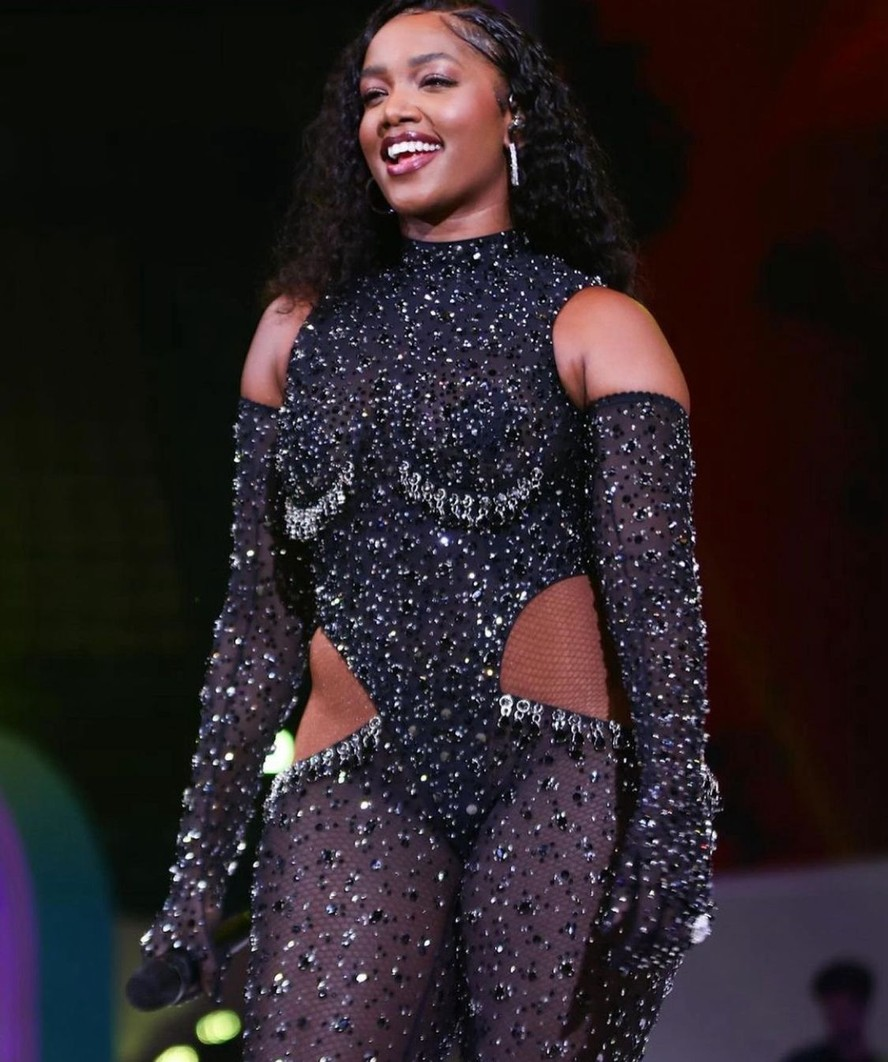
Iza

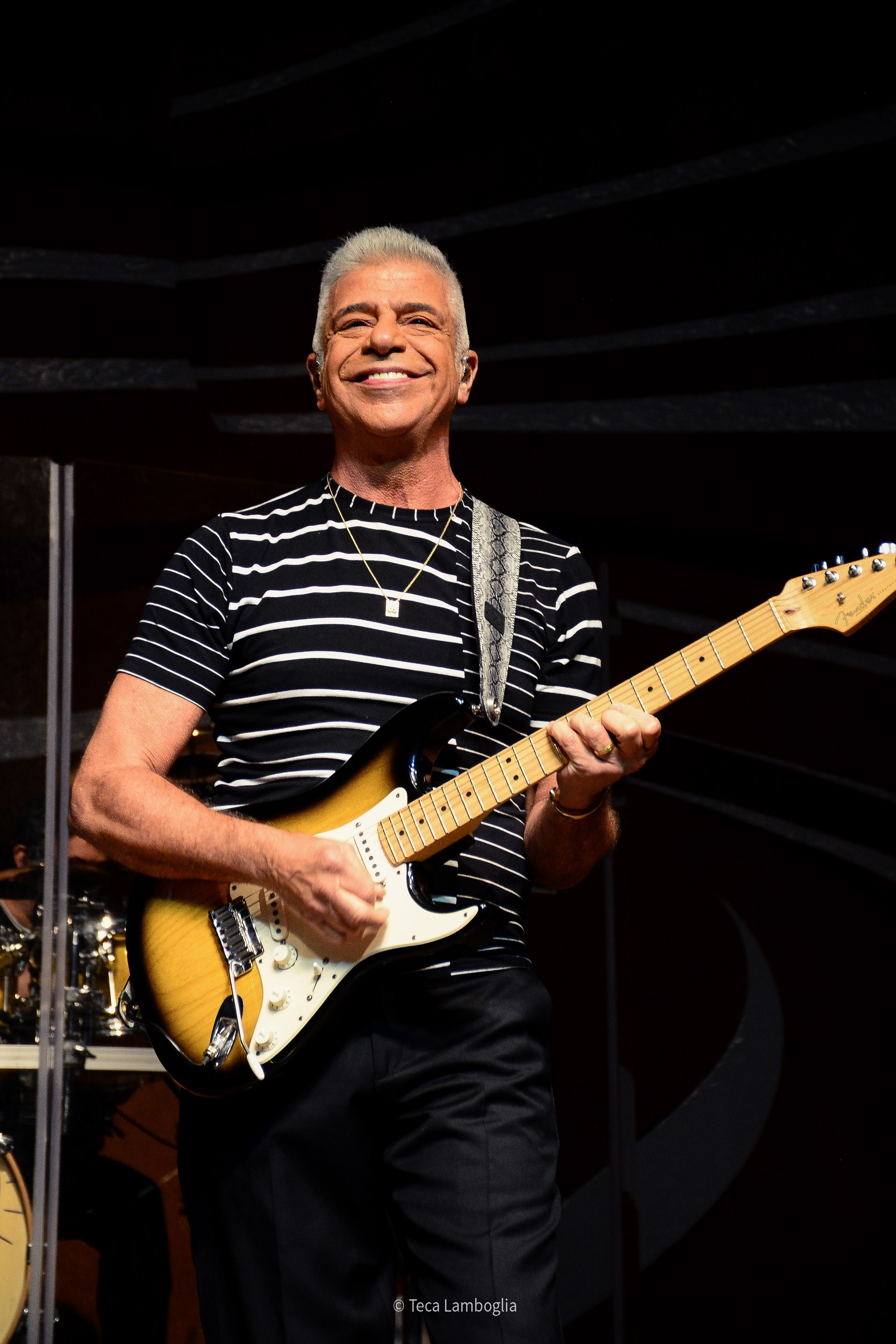
Lulu Santos

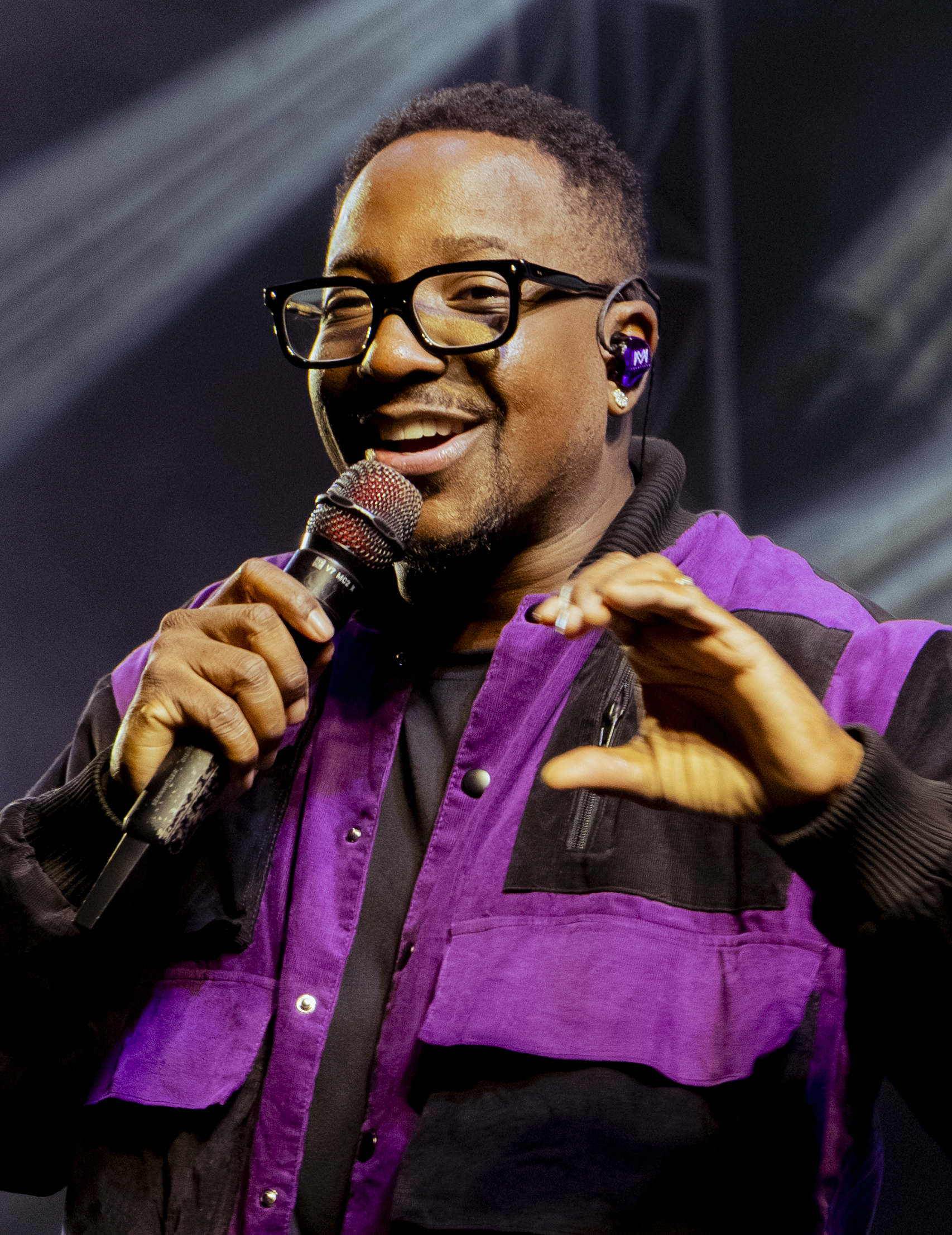
Mumuzinho (Guest coach)

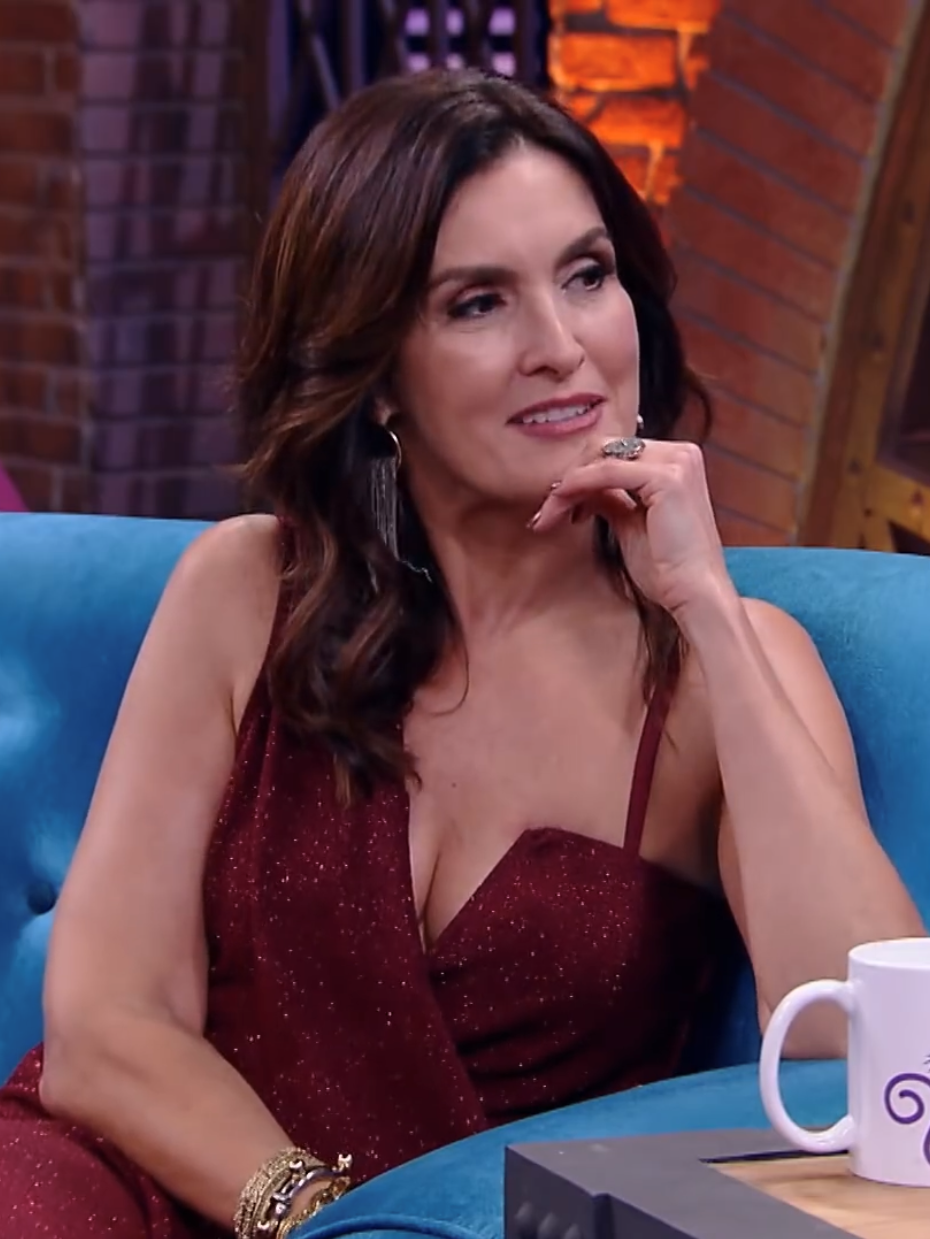
Fátima Bernardes (host)

== Teams ==
Key

Winner
Runner-up

Eliminated in the Live Finals
Eliminated in the Showdowns

Stolen in the Battles
Eliminated in the Battles

Coaches	Top 40 artists					
Carlinhos Brown						
Carlinhos Brown	Amanda Maria	Matu Miranda	Bruna Bento	Chelle	Rodrigo Castellani	The Frans
Carlinhos Brown	Natália Nó	Danny Ribeiro	Joara Mainenti	Luker	Arthur & Matheus	
Michel Teló						
Michel Teló	Jhonny	Renan Zonta	Guga Salles	Flavinha Rocha	Marcela Borges	Tay Rodriguez
Michel Teló	Igor Santos	Thainara & Thatiane	Agatha Henriques	Natie & Vivi	Sérgio Augusto & Bruno	
Iza						
Iza	Thais Ribeiro	Luana Camarah	Elô	Julia Vargas	Marquinho Osócio	Tamar
Iza	~~Jhonny~~	~~GUT~~	Carol Moura	Rayane Fortes	Lola Borges	
Lulu Santos						
Lulu Santos	Ivan Barreto	GUT	Dominique	Dri Santana	Ton	Phil Zaq
Lulu Santos	~~The Frans~~	~~Tamar~~	Sabrina Iwata	Grazi Vilanueva	Anne Glober	
Note: Italicized names are stolen artists (names struck through within former teams).

== Blind Auditions ==
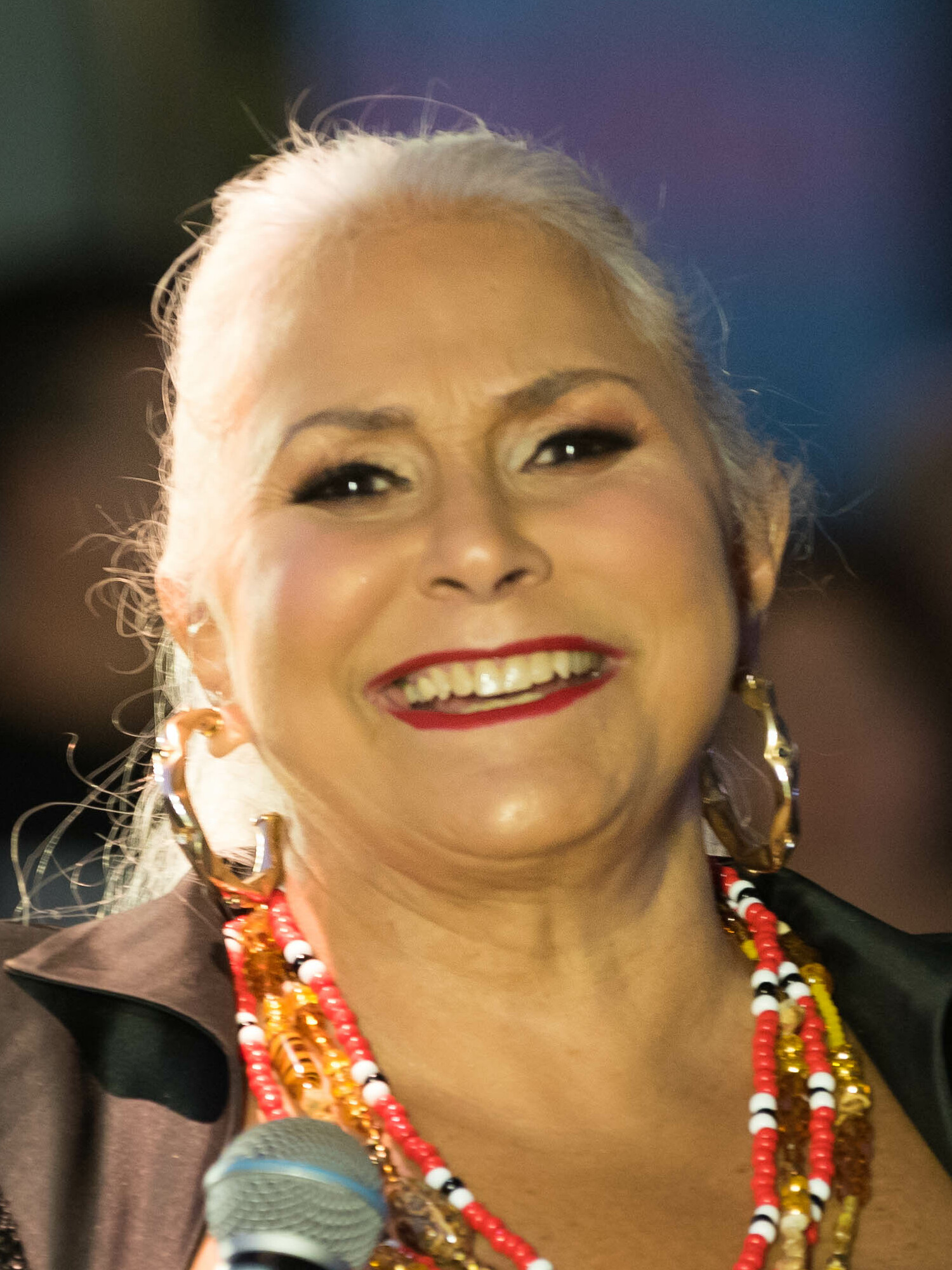
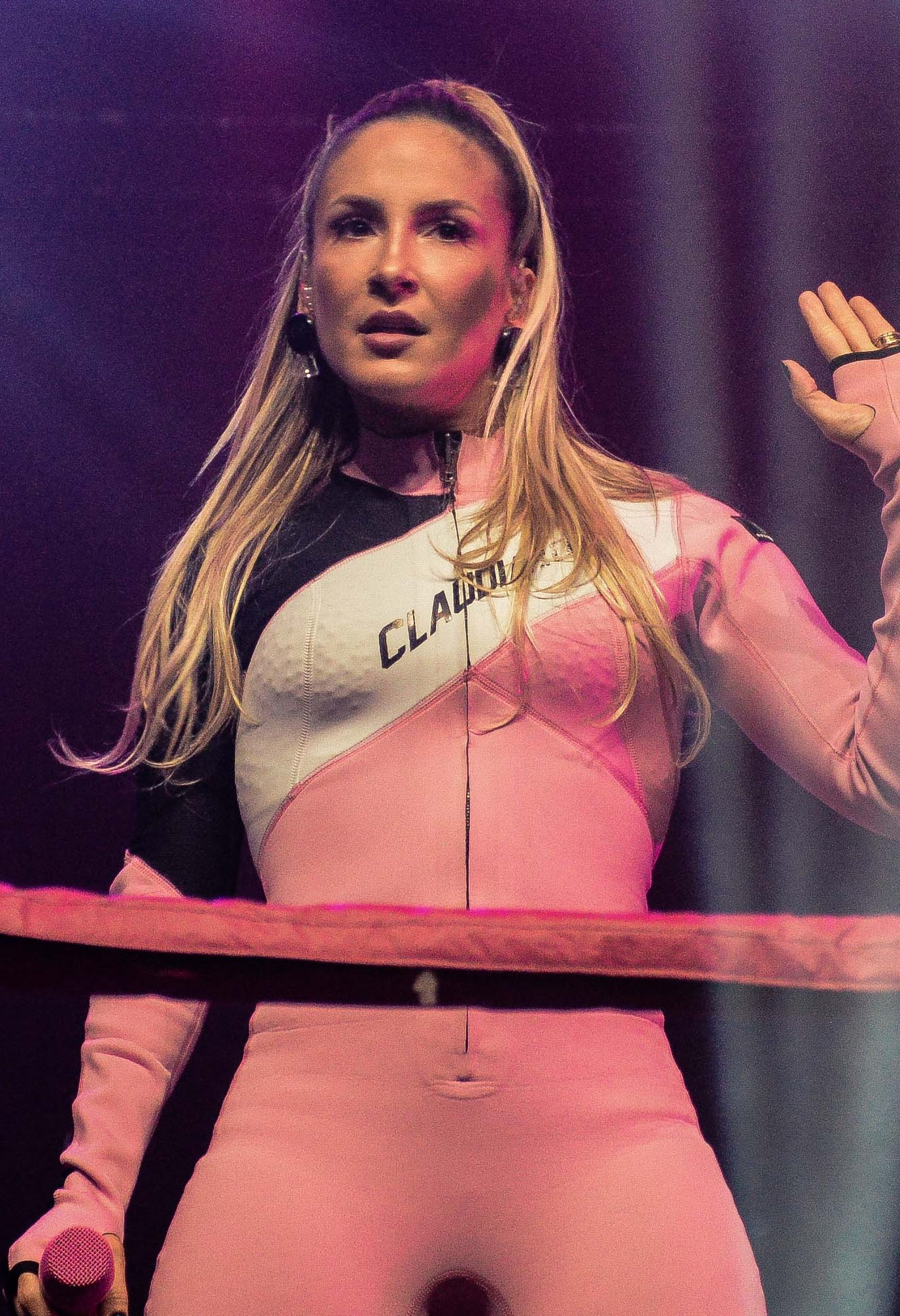
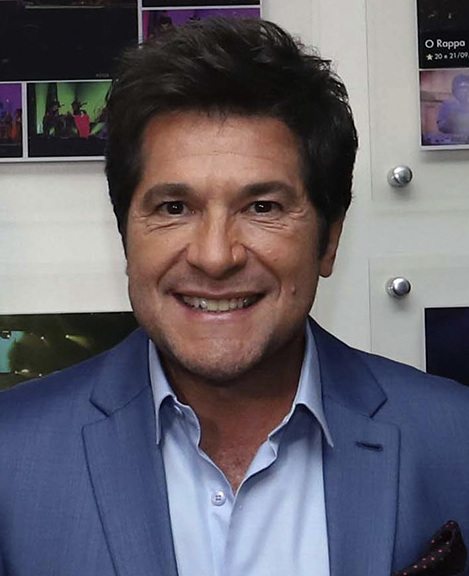
Fafá de Belém, Claudia Leitte and Daniel served as guest.

Each coach has two "blocks" to prevent another coach from getting an artist. At the end of the round, each coach formed a team of ten artists, creating a total of 40 artists advancing to the battles. At the end of the blind auditions, Iza (or Mumuzinho) didn't use any of her blocks.

Key

✔	Coach pressed "I WANT YOU" button
	Artist defaulted to this coach's team
	Artist picked a coach's team
	Artist eliminated with no coach pressing their "I WANT YOU" button
	Artist is an 'All Star' contestant
✘	Coach pressed "I WANT YOU" button, but was blocked by another coach from getting the artist
	Blocked by Brown; Blocked by Teló; Blocked by Iza; Blocked by Lulu

Blind auditions results
Episode	Order	Artist	Age	Hometown	Song	Coach's and contestant's choices			
Episode	Order	Artist	Age	Hometown	Song	Brown	Teló	Iza	Lulu
Episode 1 (November 28, 2023)	1	Luana Camarah	36	Taubaté	"Troca de Calçada"	✔	✔	✔	✘
Episode 1 (November 28, 2023)	2	Phil Zaq	35	Rio de Janeiro	"Make It Rain"	–	–	–	✔
Episode 1 (November 28, 2023)	3	Wesline	24	Cacoal	"Como Eu Quero"	–	–	–	–
Episode 1 (November 28, 2023)	4	Matu Miranda	29	Campo Grande	"Lambada de Serpente"	✔	–	✔	✔
Episode 1 (November 28, 2023)	5	Sérgio Augusto & Bruno	38/30	Barão de Cocais	"Fogão de Lenha"	–	✔	–	–
Episode 1 (November 28, 2023)	6	Natie & Vivi	20/23	Rio de Janeiro	"Toxic"	✔	✔	✔	✔
Episode 1 (November 28, 2023)	7	Jhonny	31	Florianópolis	"Perfume"	✔	✔	✔	✔
Episode 1 (November 28, 2023)	8	Amanda Maria	36	São Paulo	"Eu Te Amo,Te Amo, Te Amo"	✔	✔	✔	✔
Episode 1 (November 28, 2023)	9	Ivan Barreto	42	Uberlândia	"I Can't Stop Loving You"	✔	✔	✔	✔
Episode 2 (November 30, 2023)	1	Chelle	32	São Gonçalo	"You Don't Know My Name"	✔	✔	✘	✔
Episode 2 (November 30, 2023)	2	Arthur & Matheus	27/24	Brasília	"É o Amor"	✔	–	–	–
Episode 2 (November 30, 2023)	3	Renan Zonta	29	Curitiba	"Kiwi"	✔	✔	✔	✔
Episode 2 (November 30, 2023)	4	Joana Catharina	28	Ubaitaba	"Cabide"	–	–	–	–
Episode 2 (November 30, 2023)	5	GUT	24	General Maynard	"Lay Me Down"	–	–	✔	✔
Episode 2 (November 30, 2023)	6	The Frans	29	Sorocaba	"Bad Guy"	✔	–	–	✔
Episode 2 (November 30, 2023)	7	Tamar	26	Recife	"Bilhete"	✔	✔	✔	✔
Episode 2 (November 30, 2023)	8	Thais Ribeiro	23	São Paulo	"Retratos e Canções"	✔	✔	✔	✔
Episode 2 (November 30, 2023)	9	Agatha Henriques	18	Aracajú	"Mamma Knows Best"	✘	✔	✔	✔
Episode 3 (December 5, 2023)	1	Rayane Fortes	29	Fortaleza	"Trouble"	✔	✔	✔	✔
Episode 3 (December 5, 2023)	2	Flavinha Rocha	24	Santa Cruz do Capibaribe	"Menina Sem Juízo"	✔	✔	✔	–
Episode 3 (December 5, 2023)	3	Anne Glober	36	Curitiba	"Vênus"	✔	✘	✔	✔
Episode 3 (December 5, 2023)	4	Marcela Borges	25	Montes Claros	"All in My Head"	✔	✔	✔	✔
Episode 3 (December 5, 2023)	5	Danny Ribeiro	26	Ubatuba	"Domino"	✔	✔	✔	✔
Episode 3 (December 5, 2023)	6	Ton	28	Itaguaí	"Sobrevivi"	–	–	–	✔
Episode 3 (December 5, 2023)	7	Binho Cruz	34	São Paulo	"Sinal"	–	–	–	–
Episode 3 (December 5, 2023)	8	Julia Vargas	34	Nova Friburgo	"Pé na Areia"	✔	–	✔	✔
Episode 3 (December 5, 2023)	9	Rodrigo Castellani	44	Francisco Beltrão	"Superstition"	✔	✔	✔	✔
Episode 4 (December 7, 2023)	1	Luker	26	Londrina	"Harder To Breathe"	✔	–	–	–
Episode 4 (December 7, 2023)	2	Thainara & Thatiane	N/A	Londrina	"Manda Um Oi"	–	✔	✔	–
Episode 4 (December 7, 2023)	3	Marquinho Osócio	45	Rio de Janeiro	"Overjoyed"	✔	✔	✔	✔
Episode 4 (December 7, 2023)	4	Júlia Marques	18	Criciúma	"Decida"	–	–	–	–
Episode 4 (December 7, 2023)	5	Sabrina Iwata	22	Poços de Caldas	"Subirusdoistiozin"	–	–	–	✔
Episode 4 (December 7, 2023)	6	Joara Mainenti	35	Rio de Janeiro	"Caso Sério"	✔	–	✔	✔
Episode 4 (December 7, 2023)	7	Tay Rodriguez	32	Cuiabá	"Creep"	✔	✔	✘	–
Episode 4 (December 7, 2023)	8	Carol Moura	24	Araxá	"I Heard It Through The Grapevine"	–	–	✔	–
Episode 4 (December 7, 2023)	9	Dri Santana	37	Bauru	"Unconditionally"	✔	✔	✔	✔
Episode 5 (December 12, 2023)	1	Lola Borges	26	Rio de Janeiro	"Fim de Tarde"	✔	✔	✔	✔
Episode 5 (December 12, 2023)	2	Igor Santos	25	Novo Gama	"Tennessee Whiskey"	✔	✔	✘	✔
Episode 5 (December 12, 2023)	3	Natália Nó	29	Natal	"Bang"	✔	–	✔	✔
Episode 5 (December 12, 2023)	4	Grazi Vilanueva	43	João Pessoa	"Baby"	✔	–	✔	✔
Episode 5 (December 12, 2023)	5	Bruna Bento	21	Nova Friburgo	"Love on the Brain"	✔	✔	✔	–
Episode 5 (December 12, 2023)	6	Elô	22	Nova Iguaçu	"Hoje Eu Quero Sair Só"	Team full	–	✔	–
Episode 5 (December 12, 2023)	7	Fabiana Moneró	18	Rio de Janeiro	"Meiga e Abusada"	Team full	–	Team full	–
Episode 5 (December 12, 2023)	8	Guga Salles	18	Rio de Janeiro	"Por Um Minuto"	Team full	✔	Team full	✔
Episode 5 (December 12, 2023)	9	Dominique	24	Salvador	"O Que é O Amor"	Team full	Team full	Team full	✔

Non-competition performances
Order	Performers	Song
1	Carlinhos Brown, Michel Teló, Iza, Lulu Santos.	"Agora Só Falta Você"
2	Fafá de Belém	"De Quem É a Culpa?"
3	Claudia Leitte	"Liquitiqui"
4	Daniel	"Estou Apaixonado "("Estoy Enamorado")

== Battles ==
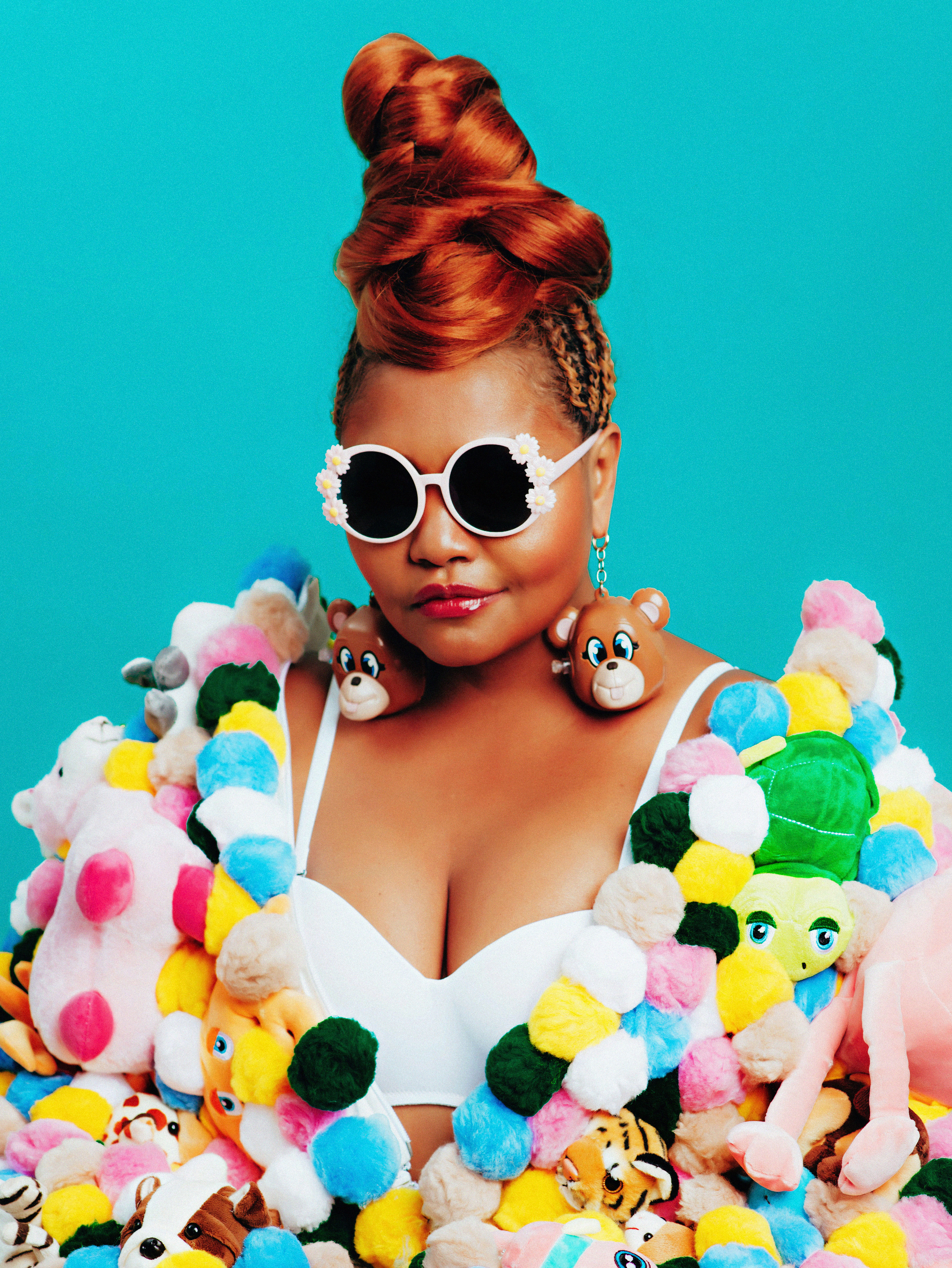
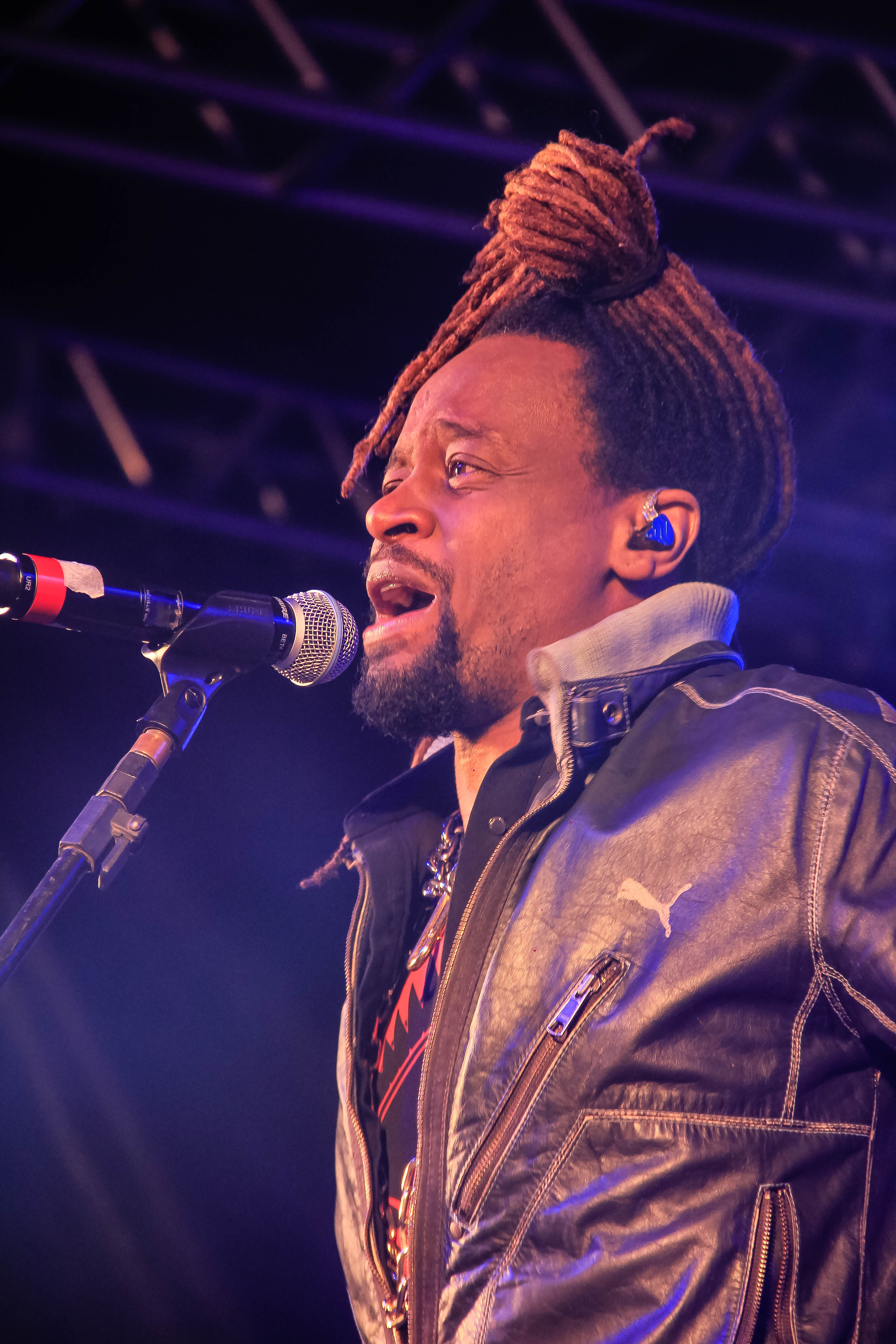
Gaby Amarantos and Toni Garrido acted as advisors to the four coaches.

The second stage of the show, the battles, aired from December 14 through December 21, 2023, comprising episodes 6 through 8. In this round, the coaches pitted two of their artists in a singing match and then select one of them to advance to the next round. Gaby Amarantos (former The Voice Kids and The Voice Brasil coach) and Toni Garrido (former The Voice + coach) served as advisors for all teams during the Battles.

Losing artists may be "stolen" by another coach, becoming new members of their team. Multiple coaches can attempt to steal an artist, resulting in a competition for the artist, who will ultimately decide which team they will join. The 'block' twist, added in the Battles in season 7, returned the Battle rounds this season. With this twist, each coach can use once to prevent one of the other coaches from getting a contestant in the "steals". Each coach has one steal. At the end of this round, six artists remained on each team; five were the battle winners, while the other one was stolen from another coach. In total, 24 artists advanced to the Showdowns.

Key

	Artist won the Battle and advanced to the Showndowns
	Artist lost the Battle but was stolen by another coach and advanced to the Showndowns
	Artist lost the Battle and was eliminated
✘	Coach pressed "I WANT YOU" button to steal the artist, but was blocked by another coach
	Blocked by Brown; Blocked by Teló; Blocked by Iza; Blocked by Lulu

Battles results
Episode	Coach	Order	Winner	Song	Loser	Steal result			
Episode	Coach	Order	Winner	Song	Loser	Brown	Teló	Iza	Lulu
Episode 6 (December 14, 2023)	Lulu	1	Ivan Barreto	"Georgia on My Mind"	Anne Glober	–	–	–	N/A
Episode 6 (December 14, 2023)	Iza	2	Luana Camarah	"Balada do Louco"	GUT	–	–	N/A	✔
Episode 6 (December 14, 2023)	Teló	3	Guga Salles	"Implorando Pra Trair"	Sérgio Augusto & Bruno	–	N/A	–	Team full
Episode 6 (December 14, 2023)	Lulu	4	Dri Santana	"River"	Tamar	–	✘	✔	Team full
Episode 6 (December 14, 2023)	Brown	5	Matu Miranda	"Tocando em Frente"	Arthur & Matheus	N/A	–	Team full	Team full
Episode 6 (December 14, 2023)	Iza	6	Thais Ribeiro	"That's My Girl"	Lola Borges	–	–	Team full	Team full
Episode 7 (December 19, 2023)	Teló	1	Tay Rodriguez	"Wicked Game"	Natie & Vivi	–	N/A	Team full	Team full
Episode 7 (December 19, 2023)	Brown	2	Bruna Bento	"O Canto da Cidade"	Joara Mainenti	N/A	–	Team full	Team full
Episode 7 (December 19, 2023)	Iza	3	Marquinho Osócio	"Um Dia, Um Adeus"	Jhonny	✔	✔	Team full	Team full
Episode 7 (December 19, 2023)	Lulu	4	Dominique	"Vapor Barato"	Grazi Villanueva	–	Team full	Team full	Team full
Episode 7 (December 19, 2023)	Teló	5	Marcela Borges	"Pesadão"	Ágatha Henriques	–	Team full	Team full	Team full
Episode 7 (December 19, 2023)	Brown	6	Rodrigo Castellani	"Billie Jean"	Luker	N/A	Team full	Team full	Team full
Episode 8 (December 21, 2023)	Teló	1	Flavinha Rocha	"Graveto"	Thainara & Thatiane	–	Team full	Team full	Team full
Episode 8 (December 21, 2023)	Brown	2	Chelle	"Emotion"	Danny Ribeiro	N/A	Team full	Team full	Team full
Episode 8 (December 21, 2023)	Lulu	3	Phil Zaq	"Amarelo, Azul e Branco"	The Frans	✔	Team full	Team full	Team full
Episode 8 (December 21, 2023)	Iza	4	Elô	"Mó Paz"	Carol Moura	Team full	Team full	Team full	Team full
Episode 8 (December 21, 2023)	Teló	5	Renan Zonta	"Against All Odds (Take a Look at Me Now)"	Igor Santos	Team full	Team full	Team full	Team full
Episode 8 (December 21, 2023)	Lulu	6	Ton	"Mania de Você"	Sabrina Iwata	Team full	Team full	Team full	Team full
Episode 8 (December 21, 2023)	Iza	7	Julia Vargas	"Dê Um Rolê"	Rayana Fortes	Team full	Team full	Team full	Team full
Episode 8 (December 21, 2023)	Brown	8	Amanda Maria	"Tudo Bem"	Natalia Nó	Team full	Team full	Team full	Team full

Non-competition performances
Order	Performers	Song
6	Gaby Amarantos	"Não Vou Te Deixar"/"Reacender a Chama"
7	Toni Garrido	"A Sombra da Maldade"
8	Gaby Amarantos and Toni Garrido	"Palco"

|

== Showdowns ==
Artist was chosen by their coach and advanced to the Live Finals
Artist was eliminated

Showdowns results
Episode	Coach	Order	Artist	Song	Result
Episode 9 (December 26, 2023)	Carlinhos Brown	1	Amanda Maria	"Let It Be"	Coach's choice
Episode 9 (December 26, 2023)	Carlinhos Brown	2	Bruna Bento	"Flamingos"	Eliminated
Episode 9 (December 26, 2023)	Carlinhos Brown	3	Chelle	"Bye Bye Tristeza"	Eliminated
Episode 9 (December 26, 2023)	Iza	4	Tamar	"Dream On"	Eliminated
Episode 9 (December 26, 2023)	Iza	5	Elô	"Ainda É Cedo"	Eliminated
Episode 9 (December 26, 2023)	Iza	6	Luana Camarah	"Come Together"	Coach's choice
Episode 9 (December 26, 2023)	Lulu Santos	7	Dominique	"Carcará"	Eliminated
Episode 9 (December 26, 2023)	Lulu Santos	8	Ton	"Psiu"	Eliminated
Episode 9 (December 26, 2023)	Lulu Santos	9	Ivan Barreto	"Primavera"	Coach's choice
Episode 9 (December 26, 2023)	Michel Teló	10	Flavinha Rocha	"Quero Você do Jeito Que Quiser"	Eliminated
Episode 9 (December 26, 2023)	Michel Teló	11	Marcela Borges	"Mande Um Sinal"	Eliminated
Episode 9 (December 26, 2023)	Michel Teló	12	Renan Zonta	"Metamorfose Ambulante"	Coach's choice
Episode 10 (December 27, 2023)	Lulu Santos	1	Dri Santana	"Ovelha Negra"	Eliminated
Episode 10 (December 27, 2023)	Lulu Santos	2	GUT	"A Boba Fui Eu"	Coach's choice
Episode 10 (December 27, 2023)	Lulu Santos	3	Phil Zaq	"Deixa Tudo Como Tá"	Eliminated
Episode 10 (December 27, 2023)	Michel Teló	4	Guga Salles	"Se Olha no Espelho"	Eliminated
Episode 10 (December 27, 2023)	Michel Teló	5	Jhonny	"Me Perdoa"	Coach's choice
Episode 10 (December 27, 2023)	Michel Teló	6	Tay Rodrigues	"Dona de Mim"	Eliminated
Episode 10 (December 27, 2023)	Iza	7	Julia Vargas	"Eu Sei de Cor"	Eliminated
Episode 10 (December 27, 2023)	Iza	8	Marquinho Osócio	"A Resposta"	Eliminated
Episode 10 (December 27, 2023)	Iza	9	Thais Ribeiro	"Who's Lovin' You"	Coach's choice
Episode 10 (December 27, 2023)	Carlinhos Brown	10	Matu Miranda	"Gatas Extraordinárias"	Coach's choice
Episode 10 (December 27, 2023)	Carlinhos Brown	11	The Frans	"A Tua Voz"	Eliminated
Episode 10 (December 27, 2023)	Carlinhos Brown	12	Rodrigo Castellani	"Pro Dia Nascer Feliz"	Eliminated

== Live Finals ==
=== Round 1: Semifinals ===
Artist was chosen by their coach and advanced to the Finals
Artist was eliminated

Semifinals results
Episode	Coach	Order	Artist	Song	Result
Episode 11 (December 28, 2023)	Michel Teló	1	Jhonny	"Melhor Eu Ir"	Coach's choice
Episode 11 (December 28, 2023)	Michel Teló	2	Renan Zonta	"Oh! Darling"	Eliminated
Episode 11 (December 28, 2023)	Iza	3	Luana Camarah	"Romaria"	Eliminated
Episode 11 (December 28, 2023)	Iza	4	Thais Ribeiro	"Run to You"	Coach's choice
Episode 11 (December 28, 2023)	Lulu Santos	5	GUT	"Nada Mudou (Todo Cambió)"	Eliminated
Episode 11 (December 28, 2023)	Lulu Santos	6	Ivan Barreto	"Colors"	Coach's choice
Episode 11 (December 28, 2023)	Carlinhos Brown	7	Amanda Maria	"Respect"	Coach's choice
Episode 11 (December 28, 2023)	Carlinhos Brown	8	Matu Miranda	"Faltando um Pedaço"	Eliminated

=== Round 2: Finals ===
Finals results
Episode	Coach	Order	Artist	Song	Result
Episode 11 (December 28, 2023)
Episode 11 (December 28, 2023)	Carlinhos Brown	1	Amanda Maria	"Fé"	Runner-up
Episode 11 (December 28, 2023)	Lulu Santos	2	Ivan Barreto	"Um Dia de Domingo"	Winner (35.75%)
Episode 11 (December 28, 2023)	Michel Teló	3	Jhonny	"Separação"	Runner-up
Episode 11 (December 28, 2023)	Iza	4	Thais Ribeiro	"Nada Mais (Lately)"	Runner-up

Non-competition performances
Order	Performers	Song
11.1	Carlinhos Brown, Michel Teló, Iza, Lulu Santos.	"E.C.T."
11.2	Ivan Barreto	"I Can't Stop Loving You"

== Elimination chart ==
Key

- Team Brown
- Team Teló
- Team Iza
- Team Lulu

Results

- Winner
- Runner-up
- Saved by coach
- Eliminated

Live finals results
Artist	Round 1	Round 2
Ivan Barreto	Safe	Winner
Amanda Maria	Safe	Runner-up
Jhonny	Safe	Runner-up
Thais Ribeiro	Safe	Runner-up
GUT	Eliminated	Eliminated (round 1)
Luana Camarah	Eliminated	Eliminated (round 1)
Matu Miranda	Eliminated	Eliminated (round 1)
Renan Zonta	Eliminated	Eliminated (round 1)

== Ratings and reception ==
=== Brazilian ratings ===
All numbers are in points and provided by Kantar Ibope Media.

Episode	Title	Air date	Timeslot (BRT)	SP viewers (in points)	Source
1	Blind Auditions 1	November 28, 2023	Tuesday 10:30 p.m.	14.8	
2	Blind Auditions 2	November 30, 2023	Thursday 10:30 p.m.	16.7	
3	Blind Auditions 3	December 5, 2023	Tuesday 10:30 p.m.	15.4	
4	Blind Auditions 4	December 7, 2023	Thursday 10:30 p.m.	16.1	
5	Blind Auditions 5	December 12, 2023	Tuesday 10:30 p.m.	16.8	
6	Battles 1	December 14, 2023	Thursday 10:30 p.m.	17.5	
7	Battles 2	December 19, 2023	Tuesday 10:30 p.m.	17.5	
8	Battles 3	December 21, 2023	Thursday 10:30 p.m.	16.8	
9	Showdowns 1	December 26, 2023	Tuesday 10:30 p.m.	16.8	
10	Showdowns 2	December 27, 2023	Wednesday 10:30 p.m.	17.2	
11	Finals	December 28, 2023	Thursday 10:20 p.m.	17.2	

- In 2023, each point represents 268.083 households in 15 market cities in Brazil (76.953 households in São Paulo).
