= The Voice + season 2 =

The Voice +
- Season 2
- Hosted by: André Marques; Thaís Fersoza
- Coaches: Toni Garrido; Fafá de Belém; Ludmilla; Carlinhos Brown
- Winner: Vera de Maria Maga
- Winning coach: Toni Garrido
- No. of episodes: 10

Release
- Original network: TV Globo; Multishow
- Original release: January 30 – April 3, 2022

Season chronology
- ← Previous; Season 1

The second and final season of The Voice + premiered on TV Globo on January 17, 2021, in the 2:30 / 1:30 p.m. (BRT / AMT) daytime slot.

On April 3, 2022, 61 year-old Vera de Maria Maga from Team Toni Garrido won the competition with 34.86% of the final vote over Dionisya Moreira (Team Brown), Marcília de Queiroz (Team Fafá) and Maurício Gasperini (Team Ludmilla).

== Teams ==
Key

Winner
Runner-up

Eliminated in the Semifinals
Eliminated in the Playoffs

Stolen in the Showdowns
Eliminated in the Showdowns
Disqualified

Coaches	Top 48 artists			
Toni Garrido				
Toni Garrido	Vera de Maria Maga	Alba Lirio	Clarisse Grova	Jhusara
Toni Garrido	Eliane Vidal	Gilton Della Cella	Lucinha Bosco	Wander Borges
Toni Garrido	~~Luciene Sampaio~~	~~Wilma de Oliveira~~	Junior Vieira	Narriman Senden
Toni Garrido	Nice Luz	Hélio Henriques		
Fafá de Belém				
Fafá de Belém	Marcília de Queiroz	Atilio Ancheta	Jozenaldo Pereira	Ninah Jo
Fafá de Belém	Cássia Portugal	Fhernanda Fernandes	Ilma Brescia	Luciene Sampaio
Fafá de Belém	~~Arlindo Moita~~	~~Clarisse Grova~~	~~Ernesto Aun~~	Emílio Seresteiro
Fafá de Belém	Sandra Frascá	Osny Melo		
Ludmilla				
Ludmilla	Maurício Gasperini	Denise Pinaud	Dilma Oliveira	Sabarah
Ludmilla	Chico Aafa	Elizeth Rosa	Ernesto Aun	Wilma de Oliveira
Ludmilla	~~Geraldo Mamedh~~	~~Gilton Della Cella~~	Regina Dias	Sueli Costa Gomes
Ludmilla	Ione Papas	Vando Lipert		
Carlinhos Brown				
Carlinhos Brown	Dionisya Moreira	Acaciamaria	Geraldo Mamedh	Jurandir Vieira
Carlinhos Brown	Arlindo Moita	Avelino Bezerra	Marina Tartarini	Walter Ramalho
Carlinhos Brown	~~Fhernanda Fernandes~~	Elaine Anunan	Elvis Carvallo	Severo Ramos
Carlinhos Brown	Zê Azemar	Cris Nunes		
Note: Italicized names are stolen artists (names struck through within former teams).

== Blind auditions ==
Key

✔	Coach pressed "I WANT YOU" button
	Artist defaulted to a coach's team
	Artist picked a coach's team
	Artist eliminated with no coach pressing their "I WANT YOU" button

Episode	Order	Artist	Age	Hometown	Song	Coach's and contestant's choices			
Episode	Order	Artist	Age	Hometown	Song	Toni	Fafá	Ludmilla	Brown
Episode 1 (January 30, 2022)
Episode 1 (January 30, 2022)	1	Maurício Gasperini	61	São Paulo	"Começo, Meio e Fim"	✔	✔	✔	✔
Episode 1 (January 30, 2022)	2	Acaciamaria	85	Aracaju	"As Rosas Não Falam"	✔	✔	–	✔
Episode 1 (January 30, 2022)	3	Atilio Ancheta	73	Porto Alegre	"Tuyo"	✔	✔	✔	✔
Episode 1 (January 30, 2022)	4	Narriman Senden	65	Valinhos	"Rehab"	✔	–	–	–
Episode 1 (January 30, 2022)	5	Cássia Portugal	63	Brasília	"Minha Missão"	✔	✔	✔	✔
Episode 1 (January 30, 2022)	6	Arlindo Moita	78	Olinda	"É Proibido Cochilar"	✔	✔	✔	✔
Episode 1 (January 30, 2022)	7	Marina Tartarini	71	São Paulo	"Black Is Beautiful"	✔	–	–	✔
Episode 1 (January 30, 2022)	8	Bel Nunes	77	Aracaju	"A Ordem É Samba"	–	–	–	–
Episode 1 (January 30, 2022)	9	Alba Lirio	71	Nova Friburgo	"Para Ver as Meninas"	✔	–	–	✔
Episode 1 (January 30, 2022)	10	Dionisya Moreira	90	Juiz de Fora	"Gostoso Demais"	–	–	–	✔
Episode 1 (January 30, 2022)	11	Chico Aafa	67	Goiânia	"A Morte do Vaqueiro"	–	–	✔	–
Episode 1 (January 30, 2022)	12	Lucinha Bosco	76	Santa Luzia	"Pedacinhos do Céu"	✔	✔	✔	–
Episode 2 (February 6, 2022)
Episode 2 (February 6, 2022)	1	Jhusara	68	Rio de Janeiro	"Enredo do Meu Samba"	✔	✔	✔	–
Episode 2 (February 6, 2022)	2	Clarisse Grova	63	Rio de Janeiro	"Corsário"	✔	✔	✔	✔
Episode 2 (February 6, 2022)	3	Elizeth Rosa	68	São Paulo	"Mineira"	✔	✔	✔	–
Episode 2 (February 6, 2022)	4	Wander Borges	68	Brasília	"Balada do Louco"	✔	–	–	–
Episode 2 (February 6, 2022)	5	Walter Ramalho	66	Quixadá	"Entre a Serpente e a Estrela"	–	–	✔	✔
Episode 2 (February 6, 2022)	6	Cris Nunes	63	Santos	"É Luxo Só"	✔	–	✔	✔
Episode 2 (February 6, 2022)	7	Marcília de Queiroz	89	Santos Dumont	"Alguém Como Tú"	✔	✔	✔	✔
Episode 2 (February 6, 2022)	8	Lina Sousa	71	Aracaju	"Asa Branca"	–	–	–	–
Episode 2 (February 6, 2022)	9	Vando Lipert	62	Porto Alegre	"Dust in the Wind"	✔	✔	✔	✔
Episode 2 (February 6, 2022)	10	Wilma de Oliveira	73	São Paulo	"Verde"	✔	–	–	–
Episode 2 (February 6, 2022)	11	Fhernanda Fernandes	65	Rio de Janeiro	"Vou Deitar e Rolar"	✔	–	–	✔
Episode 2 (February 6, 2022)	12	Sueli Costa Gomes	60	Curitiba	"The Winner Takes It All"	–	–	✔	–
Episode 2 (February 6, 2022)	13	Ninah Jo	62	Rio de Janeiro	"Paciência"	✔	✔	✔	✔
Episode 3 (February 13, 2022)
Episode 3 (February 13, 2022)	1	Jurandir Vieira	65	Teresina	"Sabor a Mí"	✔	✔	✔	✔
Episode 3 (February 13, 2022)	2	Dilma Oliveira	60	Rio de Janeiro	"Cara Valente"	✔	✔	✔	–
Episode 3 (February 13, 2022)	3	Ione Papas	61	Salvador	"O Quereres"	–	–	✔	–
Episode 3 (February 13, 2022)	4	Junior Vieira	70	Brejo da Madre de Deus	"Cardápio do Vaqueiro"	✔	–	–	–
Episode 3 (February 13, 2022)	5	Emílio Seresteiro	76	Goiânia	"Laura"	✔	✔	–	–
Episode 3 (February 13, 2022)	6	Regina Dias	63	São Carlos	"Casa no Campo"	–	–	✔	–
Episode 3 (February 13, 2022)	7	Ernesto Aun	75	São Paulo	"A Volta do Boêmio"	–	✔	✔	–
Episode 3 (February 13, 2022)	8	Sarita	72	São Paulo	"Ti voglio tanto bene"	–	–	–	–
Episode 3 (February 13, 2022)	9	Elaine Anunan	61	Belo Horizonte	"You Oughta Know"	✔	–	–	✔
Episode 3 (February 13, 2022)	10	Luciene Sampaio	61	Rio de Janeiro	"Atrás da Porta"	✔	–	✔	–
Episode 3 (February 13, 2022)	11	Geraldo Mamedh	60	Três Corações	"Luz do Sol"	–	✔	✔	–
Episode 3 (February 13, 2022)	12	Sandra Frascá	69	Batatais	"Retalhos de Cetim"	✔	✔	✔	✔
Episode 3 (February 13, 2022)	13	Eliane Vidal	71	Rio das Pedras	"Resposta ao Tempo"	✔	–	✔	–
Episode 3 (February 13, 2022)	14	Avelino Bezerra	67	Campinas	"Reconvexo"	✔	✔	✔	✔
Episode 4 (February 20, 2022)
Episode 4 (February 20, 2022)	1	Severo Ramos	69	Campina Grande	"'Sanfona Sentida"	✔	✔	✔	✔
Episode 4 (February 20, 2022)	2	Denise Pinaud	63	Florianópolis	"Deixa"	✔	✔	✔	✔
Episode 4 (February 20, 2022)	3	Osny Melo	63	Santo André	"Skyline Pigeon"	✔	✔	–	–
Episode 4 (February 20, 2022)	4	Duxtei	74	Araçatuba	" Quando Te Vi (Till There Was You)"	–	–	–	–
Episode 4 (February 20, 2022)	5	Nice Luz	65	Curitiba	"Volver"	✔	–	–	–
Episode 4 (February 20, 2022)	6	Sabarah	69	Florianópolis	"Dias de Lua"	✔	–	✔	✔
Episode 4 (February 20, 2022)	7	Ilma Brescia	63	Belo Horizonte	"Você e Eu"	–	✔	–	–
Episode 4 (February 20, 2022)	8	Zê Azemar	63	Porto Alegre	"Saigon"	–	✔	–	✔
Episode 4 (February 20, 2022)	9	Hélio Henriques	66	Itabaiana	"Começaria Tudo Outra Vez"	✔	–	✔	–
Episode 4 (February 20, 2022)	10	Jozenaldo Pereira	63	Camaragibe	"Vai Ficar na Saudade"	–	✔	–	
Episode 4 (February 20, 2022)	11	Elvis Carvallo	63	Manaus	"Um Velho Malandro de Corpo Fechado"	–	Team full	✔	✔
Episode 4 (February 20, 2022)	12	Gilton Della Cella	61	Ubaíra	"Lamento Sertanejo"	✔	Team full	✔	Team full
Episode 4 (February 20, 2022)	13	Vera de Maria Maga	61	Petrolina	"Esperando na Janela"	✔	Team full	Team full	Team full

== Showdowns ==
In this phase of the competition, each of the coaches will split the team into three groups of four artists. Two will advance to the Playoffs, while the remaining two can still be stolen by other coaches. Each coach can steal two artists from other teams.

Artist won the Showdown and advanced to the Playoffs
Artist lost the Showdown but was stolen by another coach and advanced to the Playoffs
Artist was eliminated
Artist was disqualified

Episode	Coach	Order	Song	Artists		Song	Order	Steal result			
Episode	Coach	Order	Song	Winners	Losers	Song	Order	Toni	Fafá	Ludmilla	Brown
Episode 5 (February 27, 2022)	Brown	1	"Chão de Estrelas"	Acaciamaria	Elvis Carvallo	"Tenha Calma"	2	—	—	—	N/A
Episode 5 (February 27, 2022)	Brown	3	"At Last"	Marina Tartarini	Zê Azemar	"Vai e Vem"	4	—	—	—	N/A
Episode 5 (February 27, 2022)	Ludmilla	5	"Planeta Água"	Chico Aafa	Regina Dias	"Final Feliz"	8	—	—	N/A	—
Episode 5 (February 27, 2022)	Ludmilla	7	"Garota Dourada"	Maurício Gasperini	Geraldo Mamedh	"Drão"	6	—	—	N/A	✔
Episode 5 (February 27, 2022)	Toni	9	"Carcará"	Alba Lirio	Narriman Senden	"Sangue Latino"	10	N/A	—	—	—
Episode 5 (February 27, 2022)	Toni	12	"Have You Ever Seen The Rain?"	Wander Borges	Nice Luz	"Estou Apaixonado"	11	N/A	—	—	—
Episode 5 (February 27, 2022)	Fafá	13	"Romance Rosa (Bachata Rosa)"	Atilio Ancheta	Emílio Seresteiro	"Marina"	14	—	N/A	—	—
Episode 5 (February 27, 2022)	Fafá	16	"Caçador de Mim"	Ninah Jo	Ernesto Aun	"Cabelos Brancos"	15	—	N/A	✔	—
Episode 6 (March 6, 2022)	Fafá	1	"Último Desejo"	Cássia Portugal	Osny Melo	—	4	—	N/A	—	—
Episode 6 (March 6, 2022)	Fafá	3	"Carinhoso"	Marcília de Queiroz	Clarisse Grova	"Um Móbile no Furacão"	2	✔	N/A	—	—
Episode 6 (March 6, 2022)	Ludmilla	5	"O Morro Não Tem Vez"	Dilma Oliveira	Vando Lipert	—	8	—	—	N/A	—
Episode 6 (March 6, 2022)	Ludmilla	6	"Tristeza Pé no Chão"	Elizeth Rosa	Sueli Costa Gomes	"Todo Azul do Mar"	7	—	—	N/A	—
Episode 6 (March 6, 2022)	Brown	9	"Lua Branca"	Avelino Bezerra	Cris Nunes	—	10	—	—	—	N/A
Episode 6 (March 6, 2022)	Brown	11	"Alguém Me Disse"	Jurandir Vieira	Severo Ramos	"Toda a Hora"	12	—	—	—	N/A
Episode 6 (March 6, 2022)	Toni	13	"'O Que É, O Que É?"	Jhusara	Luciene Sampaio	"Upa, Neguinho"	14	N/A	✔	—	—
Episode 6 (March 6, 2022)	Toni	15	"Foi Deus"	Vera de Maria Maga	Wilma de Oliveira	"Serrado"	16	N/A	—	✔	—
Episode 7 (March 13, 2022)	Ludmilla	1	"Dindi"	Denise Pinaud	Ione Papas	—	3	—	—	Team full	—
Episode 7 (March 13, 2022)	Ludmilla	4	"Olha"	Sabarah	Gilton Della Cella	"Sinônimos"	2	✔	—	Team full	—
Episode 7 (March 13, 2022)	Fafá	6	"Brigas, Nunca Mais"	Ilma Brescia	Sandra Frascá	"Não Deixe o Samba Morrer"	8	Team full	N/A	Team full	—
Episode 7 (March 13, 2022)	Fafá	7	"Tortura de Amor"	Jozenaldo Pereira	Arlindo Moita	"Aquilo Bom"	5	Team full	N/A	Team full	✔
Episode 7 (March 13, 2022)	Toni	9	"What a Diff'rence a Day Makes"	Eliane Vidal	Hélio Henriques	—	10	Team full	—	Team full	Team full
Episode 7 (March 13, 2022)	Toni	12	"Você Me Vira a Cabeça"	Lucinha Bosco	Junior Vieira	"Saudade Imprudente"	11	Team full	—	Team full	Team full
Episode 7 (March 13, 2022)	Brown	13	"Tango para Tereza"	Dionisya Moreira	Elaine Anunan	"Blues da Piedade"	14	Team full	—	Team full	Team full
Episode 7 (March 13, 2022)	Brown	16	"Borbulhas de Amo"	Walter Ramalho	Fhernanda Fernandes	"Certas Canções"	15	Team full	✔	Team full	Team full

== Playoffs ==
Artist was chosen by their coach and advanced to the Final show
Artist was eliminated

Episode	Coach	Order	Artist	Song	Result
Episode 8 (March 20, 2022)	Carlinhos Brown	1	Arlindo Moita	"Sebastiana"	Eliminated
Episode 8 (March 20, 2022)	Carlinhos Brown	2	Dionisya Moreira	"Meu Mundo Caiu"	Coach's choice
Episode 8 (March 20, 2022)	Carlinhos Brown	3	Geraldo Mamedh	"Simples Carinho"	Coach's choice
Episode 8 (March 20, 2022)	Carlinhos Brown	4	Walter Ramalho	"Admirável Gado Novo"	Eliminated
Episode 8 (March 20, 2022)	Fafá de Belém	5	Atilio Ancheta	"Uno"	Coach's choice
Episode 8 (March 20, 2022)	Fafá de Belém	6	Fhernanda Fernandes	"Muito Romântico"	Eliminated
Episode 8 (March 20, 2022)	Fafá de Belém	7	Luciene Sampaio	"Gostoso Veneno"	Eliminated
Episode 8 (March 20, 2022)	Fafá de Belém	8	Ninah Jo	"Alma"	Coach's choice
Episode 8 (March 20, 2022)	Ludmilla	9	Denise Pinaud	"Amor Até o Fim"	Coach's choice
Episode 8 (March 20, 2022)	Ludmilla	10	Elizeth Rosa	"Lama"	Eliminated
Episode 8 (March 20, 2022)	Ludmilla	11	Ernesto Aun	"Historia de un Amor"	Eliminated
Episode 8 (March 20, 2022)	Ludmilla	12	Maurício Gasperini	"Menina Veneno"	Coach's choice
Episode 8 (March 20, 2022)	Toni Garrido	13	Clarisse Grova	"Jura Secreta"	Coach's choice
Episode 8 (March 20, 2022)	Toni Garrido	14	Jhusara	"Opinião"	Coach's choice
Episode 8 (March 20, 2022)	Toni Garrido	15	Lucinha Bosco	"I'll Never Love This Way Again"	Eliminated
Episode 8 (March 20, 2022)	Toni Garrido	16	Wander Borges	"Come Together"	Eliminated
Episode 9 (March 27, 2022)	Ludmilla	1	Chico Aafa	"Terezinha"	Eliminated
Episode 9 (March 27, 2022)	Ludmilla	2	Dilma Oliveira	"A Voz do Morro"	Coach's choice
Episode 9 (March 27, 2022)	Ludmilla	3	Sabarah	"Minha"	Coach's choice
Episode 9 (March 27, 2022)	Ludmilla	4	Wilma de Oliveira	"O Bêbado e a Equilibrista"	Eliminated
Episode 9 (March 27, 2022)	Carlinhos Brown	5	Acaciamaria	"Rosa"	Coach's choice
Episode 9 (March 27, 2022)	Carlinhos Brown	6	Avelino Bezerra	"Preta Pretinha"	Eliminated
Episode 9 (March 27, 2022)	Carlinhos Brown	7	Jurandir Vieira	"La mentira (Se te olvida)"	Coach's choice
Episode 9 (March 27, 2022)	Carlinhos Brown	8	Marina Tartarini	"All by Myself"	Eliminated
Episode 9 (March 27, 2022)	Toni Garrido	9	Alba Lirio	"O Trenzinho do Caipira"	Coach's choice
Episode 9 (March 27, 2022)	Toni Garrido	10	Eliane Vidal	"Juízo Final"	Eliminated
Episode 9 (March 27, 2022)	Toni Garrido	11	Gilton Della Cella	"Pedras Que Cantam"	Eliminated
Episode 9 (March 27, 2022)	Toni Garrido	12	Vera de Maria Maga	"Sufoco"	Coach's choice
Episode 9 (March 27, 2022)	Fafá de Belém	13	Cássia Portugal	"É"	Eliminated
Episode 9 (March 27, 2022)	Fafá de Belém	14	Ilma Brescia	"Onde Deus Possa Me Ouvir"	Eliminated
Episode 9 (March 27, 2022)	Fafá de Belém	15	Jozenaldo Pereira	"Os Amantes"	Coach's choice
Episode 9 (March 27, 2022)	Fafá de Belém	16	Marcília de Queiroz	"Sempre no Meu Coração"	Coach's choice

== Final show ==
=== Round 1: Semifinals ===
Artist was chosen by their coach and advanced to the Finals
Artist was eliminated

Episode	Coach	Order	Advanced	Song	Eliminated
Episode 10 (April 3, 2022)
Episode 10 (April 3, 2022)	Ludmilla	1	Maurício Gasperini	"É Preciso Saber Viver"	Denise Pinaud
Episode 10 (April 3, 2022)	Ludmilla	1	Maurício Gasperini	"É Preciso Saber Viver"	Dilma Oliveira
Episode 10 (April 3, 2022)	Ludmilla	1	Maurício Gasperini	"É Preciso Saber Viver"	Sabarah
Episode 10 (April 3, 2022)	Fafá de Belém	2	Marcília de Queiroz	"Como É Grande o Meu Amor Por Você"	Atilio Ancheta
Episode 10 (April 3, 2022)	Fafá de Belém	2	Marcília de Queiroz	"Como É Grande o Meu Amor Por Você"	Jozenaldo Pereira
Episode 10 (April 3, 2022)	Fafá de Belém	2	Marcília de Queiroz	"Como É Grande o Meu Amor Por Você"	Ninah Jo
Episode 10 (April 3, 2022)	Toni Garrido	3	Vera de Maria Maga	"Sonho Meu"	Alba Lirio
Episode 10 (April 3, 2022)	Toni Garrido	3	Vera de Maria Maga	"Sonho Meu"	Clarisse Grova
Episode 10 (April 3, 2022)	Toni Garrido	3	Vera de Maria Maga	"Sonho Meu"	Jhusara
Episode 10 (April 3, 2022)	Carlinhos Brown	4	Dionisya Moreira	"Eu Sei Que Vou Te Amar"	Acaciamaria
Episode 10 (April 3, 2022)	Carlinhos Brown	4	Dionisya Moreira	"Eu Sei Que Vou Te Amar"	Geraldo Mamedh
Episode 10 (April 3, 2022)	Carlinhos Brown	4	Dionisya Moreira	"Eu Sei Que Vou Te Amar"	Jurandir Vieira

=== Round 2: Finals ===
Episode	Coach	Order	Artist	Song	Result
Episode 10 (April 3, 2022)
Episode 10 (April 3, 2022)	Carlinhos Brown	1	Dionisya Moreira	"Outra Vez"	Runner-up
Episode 10 (April 3, 2022)	Fafá de Belém	2	Marcília de Queiroz	"Nunca"	Runner-up
Episode 10 (April 3, 2022)	Ludmilla	3	Maurício Gasperini	"Eva"	Runner-up
Episode 10 (April 3, 2022)	Toni Garrido	4	Vera de Maria Maga	"Índia"	Winner (34.86%)

== Elimination chart ==
Key

- Team Toni
- Team Fafá
- Team Ludmilla
- Team Brown

Results

- Winner
- Runner-up
- Advanced to the final
- Eliminated

Final show results
Artist	Round 1	Round 2
Vera de Maria Maga	Advanced	Winner
Dionisya Moreira	Advanced	Runner-up
Marcília de Queiroz	Advanced	Runner-up
Maurício Gasperini	Advanced	Runner-up
Acaciamaria	Eliminated	Eliminated (round 1)
Alba Lirio	Eliminated	Eliminated (round 1)
Atilio Ancheta	Eliminated	Eliminated (round 1)
Clarisse Grova	Eliminated	Eliminated (round 1)
Denise Pinaud	Eliminated	Eliminated (round 1)
Dilma Oliveira	Eliminated	Eliminated (round 1)
Geraldo Mamedh	Eliminated	Eliminated (round 1)
Jozenaldo Pereira	Eliminated	Eliminated (round 1)
Jhusara	Eliminated	Eliminated (round 1)
Jurandir Vieira	Eliminated	Eliminated (round 1)
Ninah Jo	Eliminated	Eliminated (round 1)
Sabarah	Eliminated	Eliminated (round 1)

== Ratings and reception ==
=== Brazilian ratings ===
All numbers are in points and provided by Kantar Ibope Media.

Episode	Title	Air date	Timeslot (BRT)	SP viewers (in points)	Source
1	The Blind Auditions 1	January 30, 2022	Sunday 2:30 p.m.	12.8	
2	The Blind Auditions 2	February 6, 2022	Sunday 2:30 p.m.	11.2	
3	The Blind Auditions 3	February 13, 2022	Sunday 2:30 p.m.	11.8	
4	The Blind Auditions 4	February 20, 2022	Sunday 2:30 p.m.	09.3	
5	Showdowns 1	February 27, 2022	Sunday 2:30 p.m.	09.6	
6	Showdowns 2	March 6, 2022	Sunday 2:30 p.m.	10.4	
7	Showdowns 3	March 13, 2022	Sunday 2:30 p.m.	09.9	
8	Playoffs 1	March 20, 2022	Sunday 2:30 p.m.	11.7	
9	Playoffs 2	March 27, 2022	Sunday 2:30 p.m.	10.2	
10	Finals	April 3, 2022	Sunday 2:30 p.m.	10.6	

- In 2022, each point represents 268.278 households in 15 market cities in Brazil (76.577 households in São Paulo).
