= The Voice + (Brazilian TV series) =

Brazilian reality talent show

- Genre: Reality television
- Created by: John de Mol Jr.; Roel van Velzen
- Presented by: André Marques; Thaís Fersoza (backstage); Thalita Rebouças (backstage); Fausto Silva
- Judges: Daniel; Ludmilla; Claudia Leitte; Mumuzinho; Toni Garrido; Fafá de Belém; Carlinhos Brown
- Country of origin: Brazil
- Original language: Portuguese
- No. of seasons: 3
- No. of episodes: 23

Production
- Production location: Rio de Janeiro, Brazil
- Cinematography: Multi-camera
- Running time: 75 minutes
- Production companies: ITV Studios (2021–2022); NBCUniversal and TeleImage (2026–present)

Original release
- Network: Rede Globo
- Release: 17 January 2021 – 3 April 2022
- Network: Record

Related
- The Voice (franchise); The Voice Brasil; The Voice Kids

The Voice + is a Brazilian reality talent show which premiered on Rede Globo on January 17, 2021, and ended on April 3 2022

based on the concept The Voice Brasil. The difference with this version is that only contestants over 60 years old can participate.

The main presenter is André Marques and the backstage presenter is Thalita Rebouças, both already presenters of the children's version of the program. Daniel, Claudia Leitte, Ludmilla and Mumuzinho are the coaches.

For the second season, Fafá de Belém replaced Claudia Leitte, while Daniel, Ludmilla, and Mumuzinho were set to come back. However, due to some scheduling problems with technicians Mumuzinho and Daniel, they had to be replaced by Carlinhos Brown and Toni Garrido. And Thaís Fersoza took the place of Thalita Rebouças in the backstage presentation.

== Production ==
The series is part of The Voice franchise and is based on a similar competition format in the Netherlands, entitled The Voice Senior. The Voice + is a competition aimed at the elderly over 60 years.

The first season was shown on Sundays, in the afternoon, as well as the children's version and the first year of the adult version. There were a total of twelve episodes in that first screening. The program was also shown on the Multishow channel, Mondays, at an alternative time.

== Coaches and hosts ==
=== Coaches ===
On October 23, Claudia Leitte, Mumuzinho and Daniel were announced as coaches. The fourth chair would initially be occupied by the rapper Emicida, who ended up leaving the reality afterwards. On October 30, Ludmilla was confirmed as the fourth coach.

On December 16, 2021, Fafá de Belém was announced as a new coach in place of Claudia. Daniel and Mumuzinho had to be replaced by Carlinhos Brown and Toni Garrido in the second season, due to scheduling issues.

Coach	Season	
Coach	1	2
Daniel		
Ludmilla		
Claudia Leitte		
Mumuzinho		
Toni Garrido		
Fafá de Belém		
Carlinhos Brown		

Coaches gallery

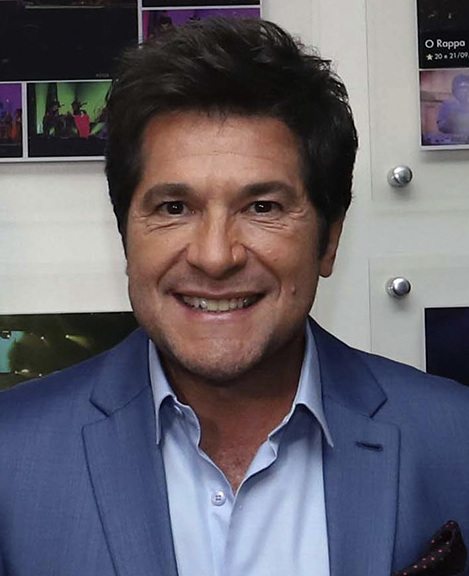
Daniel ( 1 )

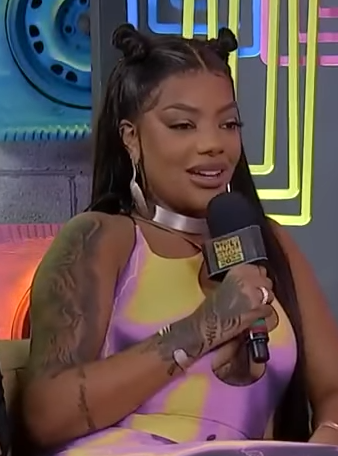
Ludmilla ( 1 - 2 )

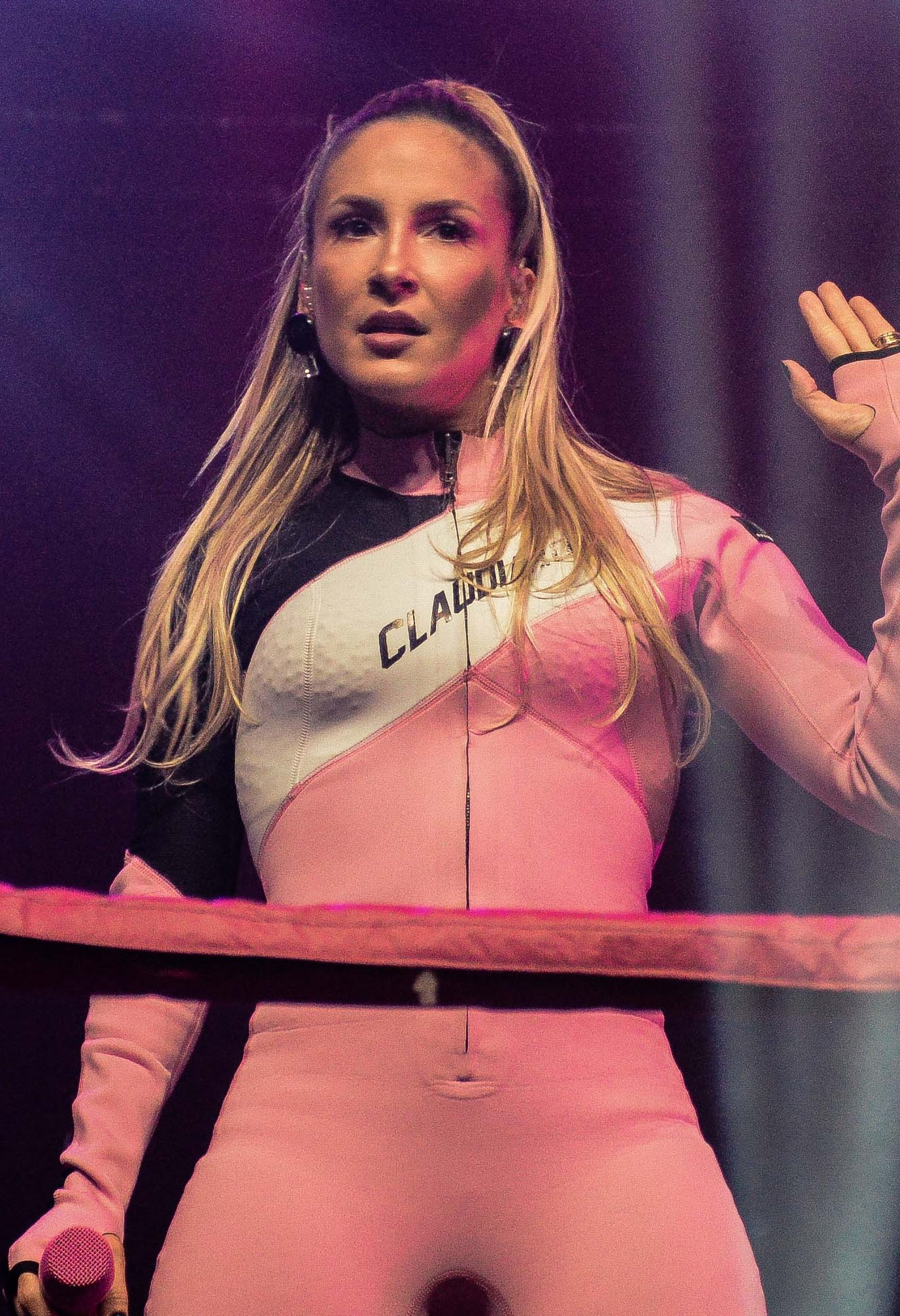
Claudia Leitte ( 1 )

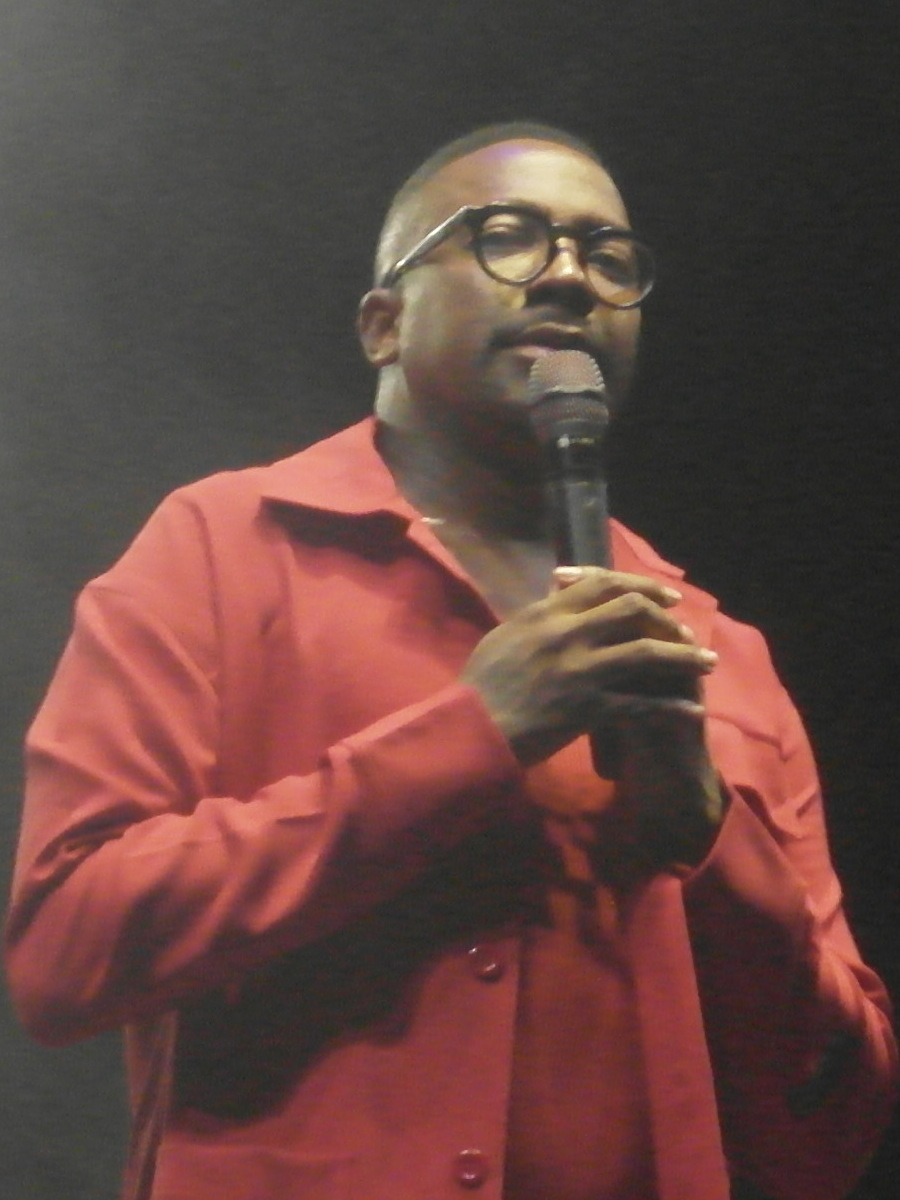
Mumuzinho ( 1 )

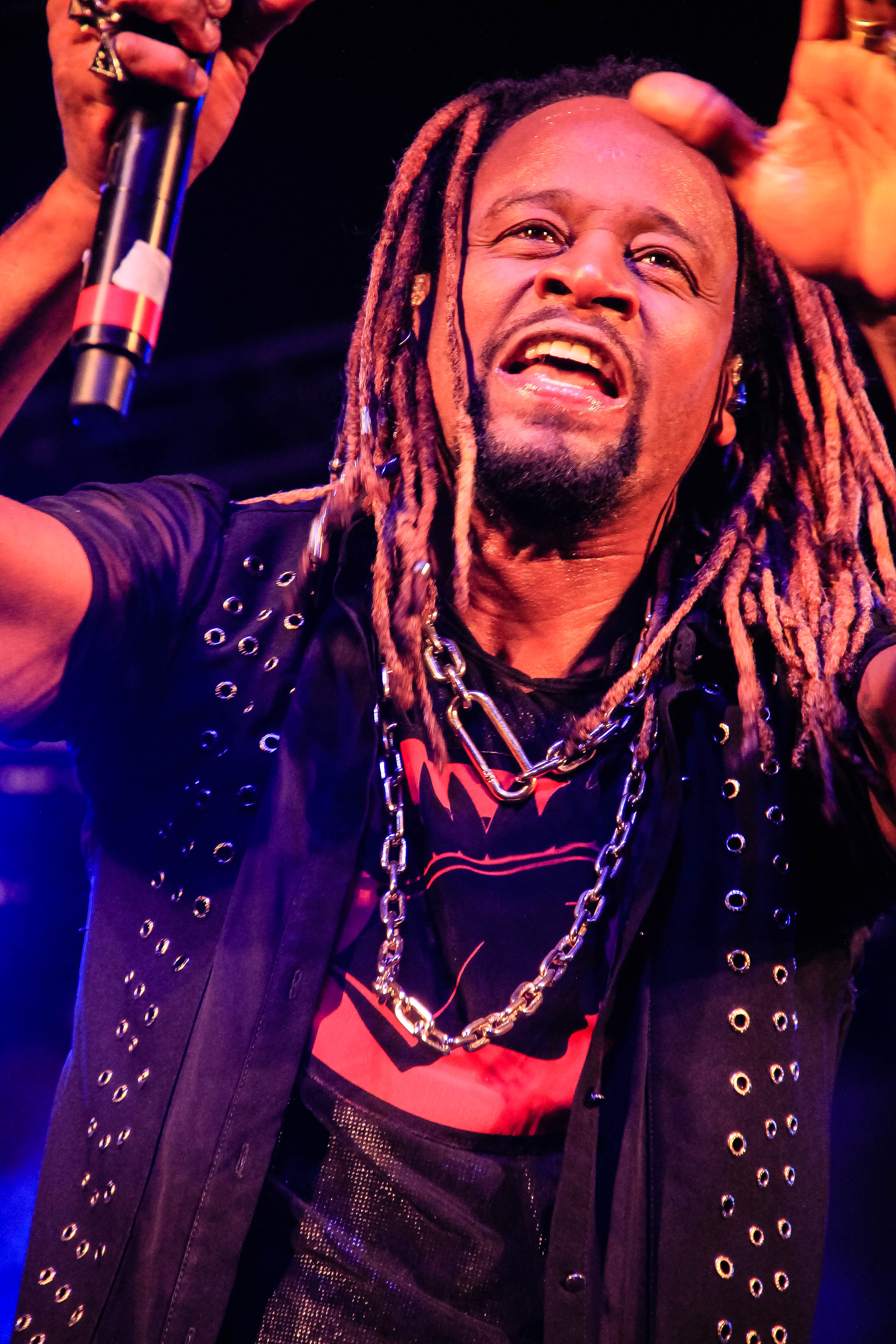
Toni Garrido ( 2 )

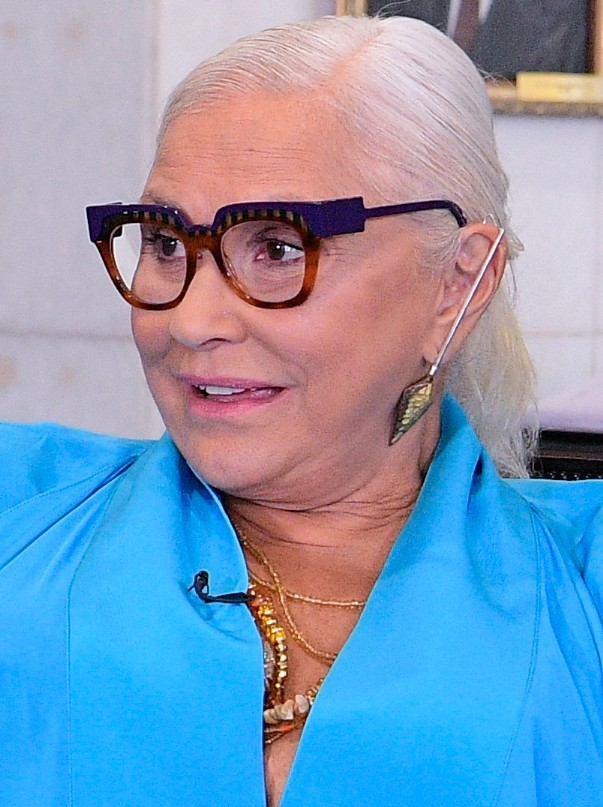
Fafá de Belém ( 2 )

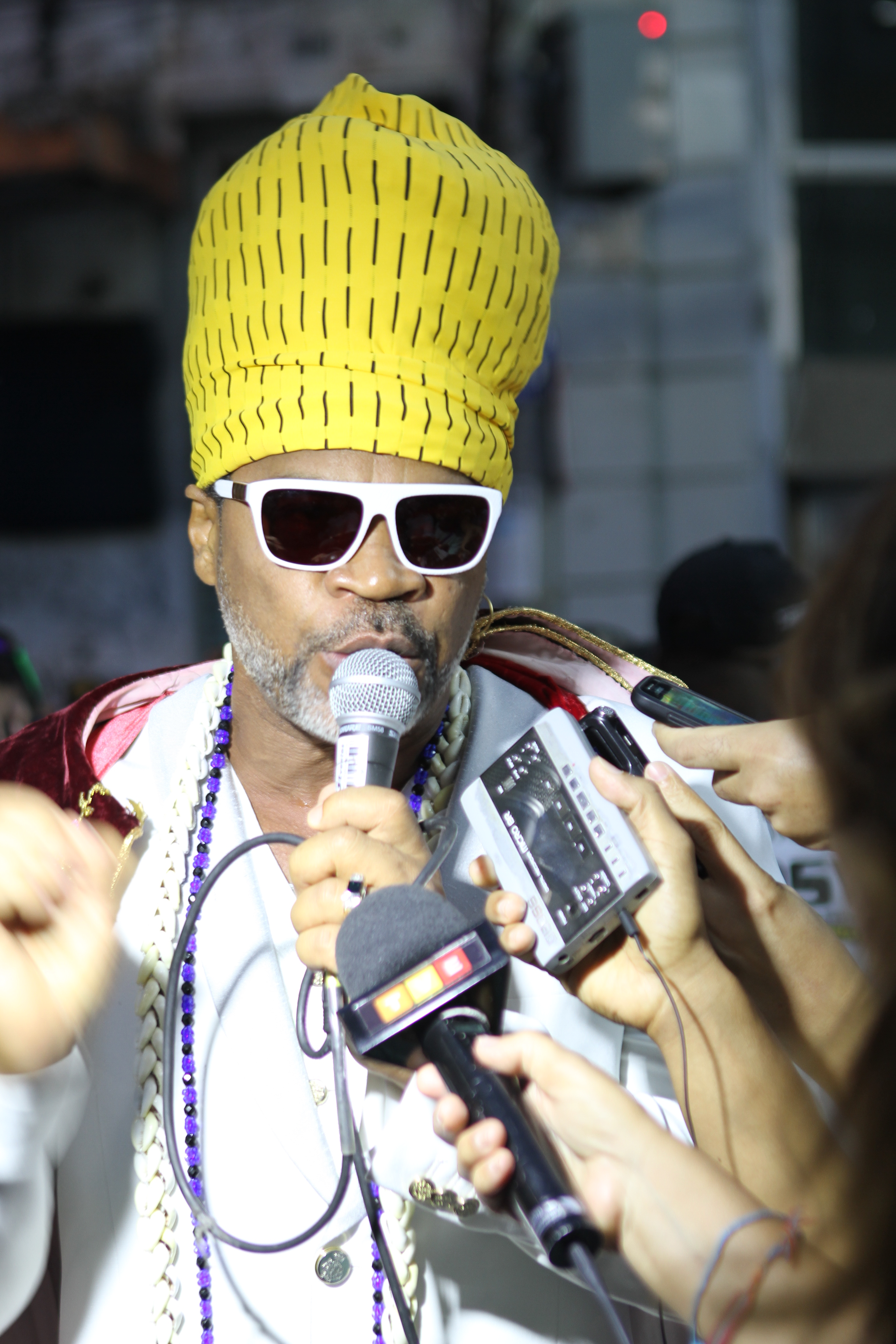
Carlinhos Brown ( 2 )

=== Hosts ===
In the first season, the program was presented by André Marques, with Thalita Rebouças behind the scenes of the program, interviewing participants, and sending messages to the public. Both were presenters of the children's version of the program since 2017.

Host	Season	
Host	1	2
André Marques		
Thalita Rebouças		
Thaís Fersoza		

Key
Main host
Backstage

== Series overview ==
The Voice + series overview
Season	Aired	Winner	Runners-up			Winning coach	Hosts		Coaches (chairs' order)			
Season	Aired	Winner	Runners-up			Winning coach	Main	Backstage	1	2	3	4
1	2021	Zé Alexanddre	Dudu França	Catarina Neves	Leila Maria	Claudia Leitte	André Marques	Thalita Rebouças	Daniel	Ludmilla	Claudia	Mumu
2	2022	Vera de Maria Maga	Dionisya Moreira	Marcília de Queiroz	Maurício Gasperini	Toni Garrido	André Marques	Thaís Fersoza	Toni	Fafá	Ludmilla	Brown

=== Coaches' results ===
Considering the final placement of the contestants who are members of their team (not the final placement of the coaches):

Coaches' results
Coach	Winner	Runner-up	Third place	Fourth place
Claudia Leitte	1 time ( 1 )	—	—	—
Toni Garrido	1 time ( 2 )	—	—	—
Ludmilla	—	1 time ( 1 )	—	1 time ( 2 )
Carlinhos Brown	—	1 time ( 2 )	—	—
Daniel	—	—	1 time ( 3 )	—
Fafá de Belém	—	—	1 time ( 2 )	—
Mumuzinho	—	—	—	1 time ( 1 )

== Ratings and reception ==
Season	Episodes	Premiered		Ended		TV season	SP viewers (in points)	Source
Season	Episodes	Date	Viewers (in points)	Date	Viewers (in points)	TV season	SP viewers (in points)	Source
1	12	January 17, 2021	13.7	April 4, 2021	12.9	2020–21		
2	10	January 30, 2022	12.8	April 3, 2022	10.6	2021–22		
