= The Voice + season 1 =

The Voice +
- Season 1
- Hosted by: André Marques; Thalita Rebouças
- Coaches: Daniel; Ludmilla; Claudia Leitte; Mumuzinho
- Winner: Zé Alexanddre
- Winning coach: Claudia Leitte
- No. of episodes: 12

Release
- Original network: TV Globo; Multishow
- Original release: January 17 – April 4, 2021

Season chronology
- Next → Season 2

The first season of The Voice + premiered on TV Globo on January 17, 2021 in the 2:30 / 1:30 p.m. (BRT / AMT) daytime slot.

On April 4, 2021, 63 year-old Zé Alexanddre from Team Claudia Leitte won the competition with 39.40% of the final vote over Catarina Neves (Team Daniel), Dudu França (Team Ludmilla) and Leila Maria (Team Mumuzinho).

== Teams ==
Key

Winner
Runner-up

Eliminated in the Finals
Eliminated in the Semifinals

Eliminated in the Showdowns
Eliminated in the Playoffs

| Coaches | Top 48 artists | | | |
|---|---|---|---|---|
| Ludmilla | | | | |
| Ludmilla | Dudu França | Sueli Rodrigues | Marisa Mel | Miracy de Barros |
| Ludmilla | Dulce Borges | Lúcia de Maria | Mamá Motta | Nice Lea |
| Ludmilla | Miss Duda Ribeiro | Felix | Aunt Elza | Vera Ambrózio |
| Mumuzinho | | | | |
| Mumuzinho | Leila Maria | Geraldo Maia | Ângela Máximo | Renato Castelo |
| Mumuzinho | Carlos Candeias | Celestina Maria | Tereza Cristina | Yeda Maranhão |
| Mumuzinho | Elias Izaias | Iracema Monteiro | Leila Marhia | Nana Barcelos |
| Claudia Leitte | | | | |
| Claudia Leitte | Zé Alexanddre | Vera do Canto e Mello | Cláudya | Oscar Henriques |
| Claudia Leitte | Ceiça Moreno | João Carlos Albuquerque | Ronaldo Barcellos | Zeni Ramos |
| Claudia Leitte | Daniel Gomes | Evinha do Forró | Juarez Caseh | Mário Figueiredo |
| Daniel | | | | |
| Daniel | Catarina Neves | Fran Martins | Abadia Pires | Henriette Fraissat |
| Daniel | Áurea Catharina | Eduardo Milan | José Mariano | Vanderlei Santanna |
| Daniel | Cassio Tucunduva | Carlos Miziara | Jorge Darrô | Mauro Gorini |

== Blind auditions ==
Key

| ✔ | Coach pressed "I WANT YOU" button |
| | Artist defaulted to a coach's team |
| | Artist picked a coach's team |
| | Artist eliminated with no coach pressing their "I WANT YOU" button |

| Episode | Order | Artist | Age | Hometown | Song | Coach's and contestant's choices | | | |
| Episode | Order | Artist | Age | Hometown | Song | Daniel | Ludmilla | Claudia | Mumu |
|---|---|---|---|---|---|---|---|---|---|
| Episode 1 (January 17, 2021) | 1 | Catarina Neves | 81 | Campinas | "Linda Flor (Yayá) (Ai, Yoyô)" | ✔ | ✔ | ✔ | ✔ |
| Episode 1 (January 17, 2021) | 2 | Vera Ambrózio | 74 | Porto Alegre | "Isto Aqui, O que É" | — | ✔ | — | ✔ |
| Episode 1 (January 17, 2021) | 3 | Geraldo Maia | 61 | Recife | "Estrada de Canindé" | ✔ | ✔ | ✔ | ✔ |
| Episode 1 (January 17, 2021) | 4 | Beth Ghedin | 63 | Florianópolis | "Shallow" | — | — | — | — |
| Episode 1 (January 17, 2021) | 5 | Zeni Ramos | 67 | Salvador | "Babalu" | ✔ | ✔ | ✔ | ✔ |
| Episode 1 (January 17, 2021) | 6 | Áurea Catharina | 63 | Porto Seguro | "Fica Tudo Bem" | ✔ | ✔ | ✔ | ✔ |
| Episode 1 (January 17, 2021) | 7 | Zé Alexanddre | 63 | Rio de Janeiro | "You Give Me Something" | ✔ | ✔ | ✔ | ✔ |
| Episode 1 (January 17, 2021) | 8 | Evinha do Forró | 61 | Piracicaba | "Feira de Mangaio" | — | — | ✔ | ✔ |
| Episode 1 (January 17, 2021) | 9 | José Mariano | 64 | São José | "A Lua e Eu" | ✔ | — | — | ✔ |
| Episode 1 (January 17, 2021) | 10 | Yeda Maranhão | 76 | São Luís | "Nem Morta" | — | ✔ | — | ✔ |
| Episode 1 (January 17, 2021) | 11 | Dudu França | 70 | São Paulo | "Fly Me to the Moon" | ✔ | ✔ | ✔ | ✔ |
| Episode 1 (January 17, 2021) | 12 | Angela Máximo | 63 | São Paulo | "Olhos Coloridos" | ✔ | — | — | ✔ |
| Episode 2 (January 24, 2021) | 1 | Abadia Pires | 68 | Uberlândia | "Você Me Vira a Cabeça" | ✔ | ✔ | ✔ | ✔ |
| Episode 2 (January 24, 2021) | 2 | Mamá Motta | 68 | Petrópolis | "Unchain My Heart" | ✔ | ✔ | ✔ | ✔ |
| Episode 2 (January 24, 2021) | 3 | Celestina Maria | 79 | Manaus | "Cordas de Aço" | — | — | ✔ | ✔ |
| Episode 2 (January 24, 2021) | 4 | Lúcia de Maria | 66 | Brasília | "Epitáfio" | ✔ | ✔ | ✔ | ✔ |
| Episode 2 (January 24, 2021) | 5 | Mário Figueiredo | 61 | São Paulo | "Sympathy for the Devil" | — | — | ✔ | — |
| Episode 2 (January 24, 2021) | 6 | Leila Maria | 64 | Rio de Janeiro | "Night and Day" | ✔ | ✔ | ✔ | ✔ |
| Episode 2 (January 24, 2021) | 7 | Dulce Borges | 63 | Rio de Janeiro | "Fullgás" | — | ✔ | — | ✔ |
| Episode 2 (January 24, 2021) | 8 | Carlos Miziara | 73 | Rio de Janeiro | "The Days of Wine and Roses" | ✔ | ✔ | ✔ | ✔ |
| Episode 2 (January 24, 2021) | 9 | Aunt Elza | 65 | Divinópolis | "Não Deixe o Samba Morrer" | — | ✔ | — | — |
| Episode 2 (January 24, 2021) | 10 | Celso Galvão | 62 | Goiânia | "Rocket Man" | — | — | — | — |
| Episode 2 (January 24, 2021) | 11 | Ceiça Moreno | 74 | Moreno | "Qui Nem Jiló" | — | — | ✔ | — |
| Episode 2 (January 24, 2021) | 12 | Jorge Darrô | 64 | Poá | "Sangue Latino" | ✔ | ✔ | ✔ | ✔ |
| Episode 2 (January 24, 2021) | 13 | Miracy de Barros | 82 | Rio de Janeiro | "Quando Te Vi (Till There Was You)" | ✔ | ✔ | ✔ | ✔ |
| Episode 3 (January 31, 2021) | 1 | Henriette Fraissat | 72 | Mogi das Cruzes | "You Are So Beautiful" | ✔ | ✔ | ✔ | ✔ |
| Episode 3 (January 31, 2021) | 2 | Ronaldo Barcellos | 67 | Rio de Janeiro | "Cada Um, Cada Um" | ✔ | ✔ | ✔ | ✔ |
| Episode 3 (January 31, 2021) | 3 | Nana Barcelos | 70 | Piraí | "Baila Comigo" | ✔ | ✔ | ✔ | ✔ |
| Episode 3 (January 31, 2021) | 4 | Cássio Tucunduva | 70 | Niterói | "I Can't Stop Loving You" | ✔ | ✔ | ✔ | ✔ |
| Episode 3 (January 31, 2021) | 5 | Claudio DaMatta | 63 | Rio de Janeiro | "Lembra de Mim" | — | — | — | — |
| Episode 3 (January 31, 2021) | 6 | Miss Duda Ribeiro | 69 | São Paulo | "Se Acaso Você Chegasse" | ✔ | ✔ | — | — |
| Episode 3 (January 31, 2021) | 7 | Elias Izaias | 63 | Volta Redonda | "Você" | ✔ | ✔ | ✔ | ✔ |
| Episode 3 (January 31, 2021) | 8 | Tereza Cristina | 64 | Recife | "As Forças da Natureza" | ✔ | — | — | ✔ |
| Episode 3 (January 31, 2021) | 9 | Oscar Henriques | 67 | Petrópolis | "In My Life" | ✔ | — | ✔ | ✔ |
| Episode 3 (January 31, 2021) | 10 | Fran Marins | 69 | Belém | "Boate Azul" | ✔ | — | — | ✔ |
| Episode 3 (January 31, 2021) | 11 | Nice Lea | 69 | Uberlândia | "Juízo Final" | ✔ | ✔ | — | ✔ |
| Episode 3 (January 31, 2021) | 12 | João Carlos Albuquerque | 64 | São Paulo | "Sultans of Swing" | ✔ | — | ✔ | ✔ |
| Episode 3 (January 31, 2021) | 13 | Carlos Candeias | 78 | Macacu | "Este Seu Olhar" | — | — | ✔ | ✔ |
| Episode 3 (January 31, 2021) | 14 | Cláudya | 72 | São Paulo | "Deixa Eu Dizer" | — | — | ✔ | — |
| Episode 4 (February 7, 2021) | 1 | Sueli Rodrigues | 65 | Araçatuba | "The Best" | ✔ | ✔ | ✔ | ✔ |
| Episode 4 (February 7, 2021) | 2 | Renato Castelo | 74 | Pirenópolis | "Dindi" | ✔ | ✔ | ✔ | ✔ |
| Episode 4 (February 7, 2021) | 3 | Juarez Caseh | 64 | Maceió | "I Don't Want to Talk About It" | ✔ | ✔ | ✔ | ✔ |
| Episode 4 (February 7, 2021) | 4 | Iracema Monteiro | 62 | Rio de Janeiro | "Começaria Tudo Outra Vez" | ✔ | ✔ | ✔ | ✔ |
| Episode 4 (February 7, 2021) | 5 | Eduardo Milan | 64 | Campo Grande | "Alguém Me Disse" | ✔ | — | ✔ | — |
| Episode 4 (February 7, 2021) | 6 | Vera do Canto e Mello | 83 | Rio de Janeiro | "My Favorite Things" | ✔ | ✔ | ✔ | ✔ |
| Episode 4 (February 7, 2021) | 7 | Billynho Blanco | 64 | Rio de Janeiro | "Bridge over Troubled Water" | — | — | — | — |
| Episode 4 (February 7, 2021) | 8 | Felix | 64 | São Bernardo | "Eu Amo Você" | ✔ | ✔ | ✔ | ✔ |
| Episode 4 (February 7, 2021) | 9 | Leila Marhia | 60 | Rio de Janeiro | "(They Long to Be) Close to You" | ✔ | — | — | ✔ |
| Episode 4 (February 7, 2021) | 10 | Vanderlei Santanna | 69 | Rio de Janeiro | "Poder da Criação" | ✔ | — | ✔ | Team full |
| Episode 4 (February 7, 2021) | 11 | Daniel Gomes | 67 | Duque de Caxias | "Você Não Me Ensinou a Te Esquecer" | ✔ | ✔ | ✔ | Team full |
| Episode 4 (February 7, 2021) | 12 | Marisa Mel | 63 | Praia Grande | "Estranha Loucura" | — | ✔ | Team full | Team full |
| Episode 4 (February 7, 2021) | 13 | Mauro Gorini | 63 | Rio de Janeiro | "She" | ✔ | Team full | Team full | Team full |

== Playoffs ==
| Artist was chosen by their coach and advanced to the Showdowns |
| Artist was eliminated |

| Episode | Coach | Order | Artist | Song | Result |
|---|---|---|---|---|---|
| Episode 5 (February 14, 2021) | Daniel | 1 | Áurea Catharina | "Dois Corações" | Coach's choice |
| Episode 5 (February 14, 2021) | Daniel | 2 | Catarina Neves | "La Barca" | Coach's choice |
| Episode 5 (February 14, 2021) | Daniel | 3 | Jorge Darrô | "Mrs. Robinson" | Eliminated |
| Episode 5 (February 14, 2021) | Claudia Leitte | 4 | Mário Figueiredo | "Pense e Dance" | Eliminated |
| Episode 5 (February 14, 2021) | Claudia Leitte | 5 | Oscar Henriques | "Onde Deus Possa Me Ouvir" | Coach's choice |
| Episode 5 (February 14, 2021) | Claudia Leitte | 6 | Zé Alexanddre | "Quando Fui Chuva" | Coach's choice |
| Episode 5 (February 14, 2021) | Ludmilla | 7 | Dudu França | "Yesterday" | Coach's choice |
| Episode 5 (February 14, 2021) | Ludmilla | 8 | Dulce Borges | "Que Nem Maré" | Coach's choice |
| Episode 5 (February 14, 2021) | Ludmilla | 9 | Vera Ambrozio | "Folhas Secas" | Eliminated |
| Episode 5 (February 14, 2021) | Mumuzinho | 10 | Celestina Maria | "Molambo" | Coach's choice |
| Episode 5 (February 14, 2021) | Mumuzinho | 11 | Elias Izaias | "Desafinado" | Eliminated |
| Episode 5 (February 14, 2021) | Mumuzinho | 12 | Yeda Maranhão | "O Sol Nascerá" | Coach's choice |
| Episode 6 (February 21, 2021) | Claudia Leitte | 1 | Ceiça Moreno | "Bate Coração" | Coach's choice |
| Episode 6 (February 21, 2021) | Claudia Leitte | 2 | Evinha do Forró | "Frevo Mulher" | Eliminated |
| Episode 6 (February 21, 2021) | Claudia Leitte | 3 | Zeni Ramos | "Luz do Sol" | Coach's choice |
| Episode 6 (February 21, 2021) | Mumuzinho | 4 | Ângela Máximo | "Verde" | Coach's choice |
| Episode 6 (February 21, 2021) | Mumuzinho | 5 | Geraldo Maia | "Mensagem" | Coach's choice |
| Episode 6 (February 21, 2021) | Mumuzinho | 6 | Nana Barcelos | "O Barquinho" | Eliminated |
| Episode 6 (February 21, 2021) | Daniel | 7 | Abadia Pires | "Infiel" | Coach's choice |
| Episode 6 (February 21, 2021) | Daniel | 8 | Carlos Miziara | "Pra Você" | Eliminated |
| Episode 6 (February 21, 2021) | Daniel | 9 | José Mariano | "Lilás" | Coach's choice |
| Episode 6 (February 21, 2021) | Ludmilla | 10 | Mamá Motta | "Casa no Campo" | Coach's choice |
| Episode 6 (February 21, 2021) | Ludmilla | 11 | Miracy de Barros | "Resposta ao Tempo" | Coach's choice |
| Episode 6 (February 21, 2021) | Ludmilla | 12 | Aunt Elza | "Garoto Maroto" | Eliminated |
| Episode 7 (February 28, 2021) | Mumuzinho | 1 | Carlos Candeias | "For Once in My Life" | Coach's choice |
| Episode 7 (February 28, 2021) | Mumuzinho | 2 | Leila Marhia | "Ritmo Perfeito" | Eliminated |
| Episode 7 (February 28, 2021) | Mumuzinho | 3 | Renato Castelo | "Rosa" | Coach's choice |
| Episode 7 (February 28, 2021) | Ludmilla | 4 | Felix | "Dias Melhores Virão" | Eliminated |
| Episode 7 (February 28, 2021) | Ludmilla | 5 | Lúcia de Maria | "Cabide" | Coach's choice |
| Episode 7 (February 28, 2021) | Ludmilla | 6 | Nice Lea | "Café da Manhã" | Coach's choice |
| Episode 7 (February 28, 2021) | Claudia Leitte | 7 | João Carlos Albuquerque | "Tudo Bem" | Coach's choice |
| Episode 7 (February 28, 2021) | Claudia Leitte | 8 | Juarez Caseh | "A Noite (La notte)" | Eliminated |
| Episode 7 (February 28, 2021) | Claudia Leitte | 9 | Ronaldo Barcellos | "Naquela Estação" | Coach's choice |
| Episode 7 (February 28, 2021) | Daniel | 10 | Fran Martins | "S de Saudade" | Coach's choice |
| Episode 7 (February 28, 2021) | Daniel | 11 | Henriette Fraissat | "De Volta Pro Aconchego" | Coach's choice |
| Episode 7 (February 28, 2021) | Daniel | 12 | Mauro Gorini | "Perfect" | Eliminated |
| Episode 8 (March 7, 2021) | Ludmilla | 1 | Miss Duda Ribeiro | "Se Eu Não Te Amasse Tanto Assim" | Eliminated |
| Episode 8 (March 7, 2021) | Ludmilla | 2 | Marisa Mel | "Eu Sei de Cor" | Coach's choice |
| Episode 8 (March 7, 2021) | Ludmilla | 3 | Sueli Rodrigues | "Canta Brasil" | Coach's choice |
| Episode 8 (March 7, 2021) | Daniel | 4 | Cássio Tucunduva | "Conversa de Botequim" | Eliminated |
| Episode 8 (March 7, 2021) | Daniel | 5 | Eduardo Millan | "Força Estranha" | Coach's choice |
| Episode 8 (March 7, 2021) | Daniel | 6 | Vanderlei Santana | "A Batucada dos Nossos Tantans" | Coach's choice |
| Episode 8 (March 7, 2021) | Mumuzinho | 7 | Iracema Monteiro | "Amor I Love You" | Eliminated |
| Episode 8 (March 7, 2021) | Mumuzinho | 8 | Leila Maria | "Ladeira da Preguiça" | Coach's choice |
| Episode 8 (March 7, 2021) | Mumuzinho | 9 | Tereza Cristina | "Malandro" | Coach's choice |
| Episode 8 (March 7, 2021) | Claudia Leitte | 10 | Cláudya | "Don't Cry for Me Argentina" | Coach's choice |
| Episode 8 (March 7, 2021) | Claudia Leitte | 11 | Daniel Gomes | "Os Amantes" | Eliminated |
| Episode 8 (March 7, 2021) | Claudia Leitte | 12 | Vera do Canto e Mello | "Carinhoso" | Coach's choice |

== Showdowns ==
| Artist was chosen by their coach and advanced to the Final shows |
| Artist was eliminated |

| Episode | Coach | Order | Artist | Song | Result |
|---|---|---|---|---|---|
| Episode 9 (March 14, 2021) | Daniel | 1 | Abadia Pires | "Explode Coração" | Coach's choice |
| Episode 9 (March 14, 2021) | Daniel | 2 | Áurea Catharina | "Pagu" | Eliminated |
| Episode 9 (March 14, 2021) | Daniel | 3 | Fran Marins | "Seu Crime" | Coach's choice |
| Episode 9 (March 14, 2021) | Daniel | 4 | José Mariano | "Noite do Prazer" | Eliminated |
| Episode 9 (March 14, 2021) | Claudia Leitte | 5 | João Carlos Albuquerque | "Pro Dia Nascer Feliz" | Eliminated |
| Episode 9 (March 14, 2021) | Claudia Leitte | 6 | Oscar Henriques | "Honesty" | Coach's choice |
| Episode 9 (March 14, 2021) | Claudia Leitte | 7 | Ronaldo Barcellos | "Lábios de Mel" | Eliminated |
| Episode 9 (March 14, 2021) | Claudia Leitte | 8 | Zé Alexanddre | "(You Make Me Feel Like) A Natural Woman" | Coach's choice |
| Episode 9 (March 14, 2021) | Mumuzinho | 9 | Angela Máximo | "Menino Sem Juízo" | Coach's choice |
| Episode 9 (March 14, 2021) | Mumuzinho | 10 | Carlos Candeias | "Minha Namorada" | Eliminated |
| Episode 9 (March 14, 2021) | Mumuzinho | 11 | Leila Maria | "Miss Celie's Blues" | Coach's choice |
| Episode 9 (March 14, 2021) | Mumuzinho | 12 | Yeda Maranhão | "Canto das Três Raças" | Eliminated |
| Episode 9 (March 14, 2021) | Ludmilla | 13 | Dudu França | "Primavera" | Coach's choice |
| Episode 9 (March 14, 2021) | Ludmilla | 14 | Dulce Borges | "Eu Te Devoro" | Eliminated |
| Episode 9 (March 14, 2021) | Ludmilla | 15 | Miracy de Barros | "Lobo Bobo" | Coach's choice |
| Episode 9 (March 14, 2021) | Ludmilla | 16 | Nice Lea | "Orgulho de um Sambista" | Eliminated |
| Episode 10 (March 21, 2021) | Mumuzinho | 1 | Celestina Maria | "A Voz do Morro" | Eliminated |
| Episode 10 (March 21, 2021) | Mumuzinho | 2 | Geraldo Maia | "Lamento Cego" | Coach's choice |
| Episode 10 (March 21, 2021) | Mumuzinho | 3 | Renato Castelo | "Eu Não Existo Sem Você" | Coach's choice |
| Episode 10 (March 21, 2021) | Mumuzinho | 4 | Teresa Cristina | "Hino ao Amor" | Eliminated |
| Episode 10 (March 21, 2021) | Claudia Leitte | 5 | Ceiça Moreno | "Gostoso demais" | Eliminated |
| Episode 10 (March 21, 2021) | Claudia Leitte | 6 | Cláudya | "Como 2 e 2" | Coach's choice |
| Episode 10 (March 21, 2021) | Claudia Leitte | 7 | Vera do Canto e Mello | "Nunca" | Coach's choice |
| Episode 10 (March 21, 2021) | Claudia Leitte | 8 | Zeni Ramos | "Besame" | Eliminated |
| Episode 10 (March 21, 2021) | Ludmilla | 9 | Lúcia de Maria | "Se Eu Quiser Falar Com Deus" | Eliminated |
| Episode 10 (March 21, 2021) | Ludmilla | 10 | Mamá Motta | "Crazy" | Eliminated |
| Episode 10 (March 21, 2021) | Ludmilla | 11 | Marisa Mel | "Começo, Meio e Fim" | Coach's choice |
| Episode 10 (March 21, 2021) | Ludmilla | 12 | Sueli Rodrigues | "I'll Never Love This Way Again" | Coach's choice |
| Episode 10 (March 21, 2021) | Daniel | 13 | Catarina Neves | "As Rosas Não Falam" | Coach's choice |
| Episode 10 (March 21, 2021) | Daniel | 14 | Eduardo Milan | "'O sole mio" | Eliminated |
| Episode 10 (March 21, 2021) | Daniel | 15 | Henriette Fraissat | "Summertime" | Coach's choice |
| Episode 10 (March 21, 2021) | Daniel | 16 | Vanderlei Santanna | "Foi Um Rio Que Passou Em Minha Vida" | Eliminated |

== Final Shows ==
=== Week 1: Semifinals ===
| Artist was chosen by their coach and advanced to the Finals |
| Artist was eliminated |

| Episode | Coach | Order | Artist | Song | Result |
|---|---|---|---|---|---|
| Episode 11 (March 28, 2021) | Daniel | 1 | Abadia Pires | "Depois do Prazer" | Eliminated |
| Episode 11 (March 28, 2021) | Daniel | 2 | Catarina Neves | "Travessia" | Coach's choice |
| Episode 11 (March 28, 2021) | Daniel | 3 | Fran Martins | "Chão de Giz" | Coach's choice |
| Episode 11 (March 28, 2021) | Daniel | 4 | Henriette Fraissat | "Papel Marché" | Eliminated |
| Episode 11 (March 28, 2021) | Claudia Leitte | 5 | Cláudya | "Preciso Aprender a Ser Só" | Eliminated |
| Episode 11 (March 28, 2021) | Claudia Leitte | 6 | Oscar Henriques | "Twist and Shout" | Eliminated |
| Episode 11 (March 28, 2021) | Claudia Leitte | 7 | Vera do Canto e Mello | "Memory" | Coach's choice |
| Episode 11 (March 28, 2021) | Claudia Leitte | 8 | Zé Alexandre | "That's What Friends Are For" | Coach's choice |
| Episode 11 (March 28, 2021) | Mumuzinho | 9 | Ângela Máximo | "Não Vá" | Eliminated |
| Episode 11 (March 28, 2021) | Mumuzinho | 10 | Geraldo Maia | "Procissão" | Coach's choice |
| Episode 11 (March 28, 2021) | Mumuzinho | 11 | Leila Maria | "Georgia on My Mind" | Coach's choice |
| Episode 11 (March 28, 2021) | Mumuzinho | 12 | Renato Castelo | "Por Causa de Você" | Eliminated |
| Episode 11 (March 28, 2021) | Ludmilla | 13 | Dudu França | "Love Is All" | Coach's choice |
| Episode 11 (March 28, 2021) | Ludmilla | 14 | Marisa Mel | "À Francesa" | Eliminated |
| Episode 11 (March 28, 2021) | Ludmilla | 15 | Miracy de Barros | "Devagar com a Louça" | Eliminated |
| Episode 11 (March 28, 2021) | Ludmilla | 16 | Sueli Rodrigues | "Mas que Nada" | Coach's choice |

=== Week 2: Finals ===
| Artist was chosen by their coach and advanced to the Final round |
| Artist was eliminated |

| Episode | Coach | Order | Artist | Song | Result |
|---|---|---|---|---|---|
| Episode 12 (April 4, 2021) | Daniel | 1 | Catarina Neves | "Malagueña" | Advanced |
| Episode 12 (April 4, 2021) | Daniel | 2 | Fran Martins | "Romaria" | Eliminated |
| Episode 12 (April 4, 2021) | Ludmilla | 3 | Dudu França | "Oh! Darling" | Advanced |
| Episode 12 (April 4, 2021) | Ludmilla | 4 | Sueli Rodrigues | "Goldfinger" | Eliminated |
| Episode 12 (April 4, 2021) | Mumuzinho | 5 | Geraldo Maia | "Sou Você" | Eliminated |
| Episode 12 (April 4, 2021) | Mumuzinho | 6 | Leila Maria | "Vou Deitar e Rolar" | Advanced |
| Episode 12 (April 4, 2021) | Claudia Leitte | 7 | Vera do Canto e Mello | "Over the Rainbow" | Eliminated |
| Episode 12 (April 4, 2021) | Claudia Leitte | 8 | Zé Alexanddre | "Pétala" | Advanced |
| Episode 12 (April 4, 2021) | Daniel | 1 | Catarina Neves | "Fascinação" | Runner-up |
| Episode 12 (April 4, 2021) | Ludmilla | 2 | Dudu França | "Deixa Chover" | Runner-up |
| Episode 12 (April 4, 2021) | Mumuzinho | 3 | Leila Maria | "I Will Always Love You" | Runner-up |
| Episode 12 (April 4, 2021) | Claudia Leitte | 4 | Zé Alexanddre | "Somebody to Love" | Winner (39.40%) |

== Elimination chart ==
Key

Team Claudia
Team Ludmilla

Team Daniel
Team Mumuzinho

Results

Winner
Runner-up

Saved by the coach
Advanced to the final
Eliminated

Final shows results per week
| Artist | Week 1 | Week 2 | |
| Artist | Week 1 | Round 1 | Round 2 |
|---|---|---|---|
| Zé Alexanddre | Safe | Advanced | Winner |
| Catarina Neves | Safe | Advanced | Runner-up |
| Dudu França | Safe | Advanced | Runner-up |
| Leila Maria | Safe | Advanced | Runner-up |
| Fran Martins | Safe | Eliminated | Eliminated (week 2) |
| Geraldo Maia | Safe | Eliminated | Eliminated (week 2) |
| Sueli Rodrigues | Safe | Eliminated | Eliminated (week 2) |
| Vera do Canto e Mello | Safe | Eliminated | Eliminated (week 2) |
| Abadia Pires | Eliminated | Eliminated (week 1) | |
| Ângela Máximo | Eliminated | Eliminated (week 1) | |
| Cláudya | Eliminated | Eliminated (week 1) | |
| Henriette Fraissat | Eliminated | Eliminated (week 1) | |
| Marisa Mel | Eliminated | Eliminated (week 1) | |
| Miracy de Barros | Eliminated | Eliminated (week 1) | |
| Oscar Henriques | Eliminated | Eliminated (week 1) | |
| Renato Castelo | Eliminated | Eliminated (week 1) | |

== Ratings and reception ==
=== Brazilian ratings ===
All numbers are in points and provided by Kantar Ibope Media.

| Episode | Title | Air date | Timeslot (BRT) | SP viewers (in points) | Source |
|---|---|---|---|---|---|
| 1 | The Blind Auditions 1 | January 17, 2021 | Sunday 2:30 p.m. | 13.7 | |
| 2 | The Blind Auditions 2 | January 24, 2021 | Sunday 2:30 p.m. | 12.5 | |
| 3 | The Blind Auditions 3 | January 31, 2021 | Sunday 2:30 p.m. | 12.6 | |
| 4 | The Blind Auditions 4 | February 7, 2021 | Sunday 2:30 p.m. | 13.8 | |
| 5 | The Playoffs 1 | February 14, 2021 | Sunday 2:30 p.m. | 13.4 | |
| 6 | The Playoffs 2 | February 21, 2021 | Sunday 2:30 p.m. | 12.6 | |
| 7 | The Playoffs 3 | February 28, 2021 | Sunday 2:30 p.m. | 14.6 | |
| 8 | The Playoffs 4 | March 7, 2021 | Sunday 2:30 p.m. | 14.2 | |
| 9 | The Showdowns 1 | March 14, 2021 | Sunday 2:30 p.m. | 12.3 | |
| 10 | The Showdowns 2 | March 21, 2021 | Sunday 2:30 p.m. | 13.3 | |
| 11 | Semifinals | March 28, 2021 | Sunday 2:30 p.m. | 13.3 | |
| 12 | Finals | April 4, 2021 | Sunday 2:30 p.m. | 12.9 | |

- In 2021, each point represents 268.278 households in 15 market cities in Brazil (76.577 households in São Paulo).
