= Toni Garrido =

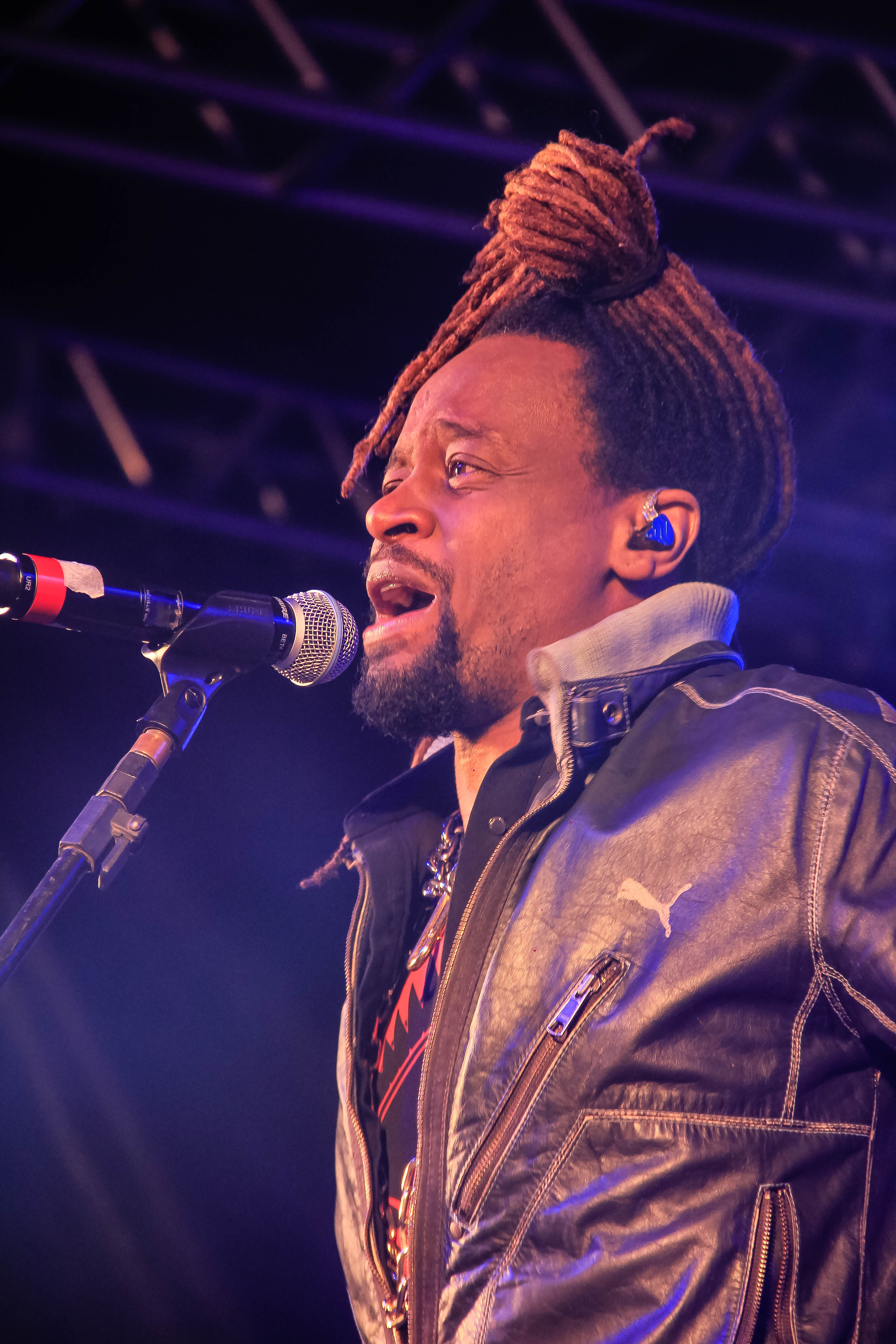
- Garrido in 2022

Background information
- Born: Antônio Bento da Silva Filho; September 7, 1967 (age 58); Rio de Janeiro, Brazil
- Genres: Reggae; Soul; Pop; MPB; Folk
- Occupations: Singer; songwriter; multi-instrumentalist; TV presenter; actor; lecturer
- Instruments: Vocals; guitar; electric guitar
- Years active: 1986–present
- Labels: Sony Music; EMI; Independent; Som Livre
- Website: www.tonigarrido.com.br

Antônio Bento da Silva Filho (born September 7, 1967, in Rio de Janeiro), known as Toni Garrido, is a Brazilian singer, TV presenter and actor. He is the lead singer of the reggae band Cidade Negra.

Born in a poor background, Garrido was adopted by the owner of the middle class apartment in Copacabana where his biological mother used to work as a maid. Garrido started playing guitar during church services, and after positive feedback he decided to pursue a musical career. He joined three friends and formed the (now extinct) Banda Bel. But in 1994 he was invited to join Cidade Negra as the lead singer, being replaced in Banda Bel by Ronnie Marruda. They became one of the most successful bands in Brazil, merging reggae, soul and pop rock. In 2008 Garrido decided to pursue a solo career, but rejoined Cidade Negra at the end of 2010.

Garrido is the lead actor in Orfeu, a 1999 Brazilian film by Carlos Diegues, and also sung the soundtrack.
