= Fafá de Belém =

Brazilian actress and singer (born 1956)

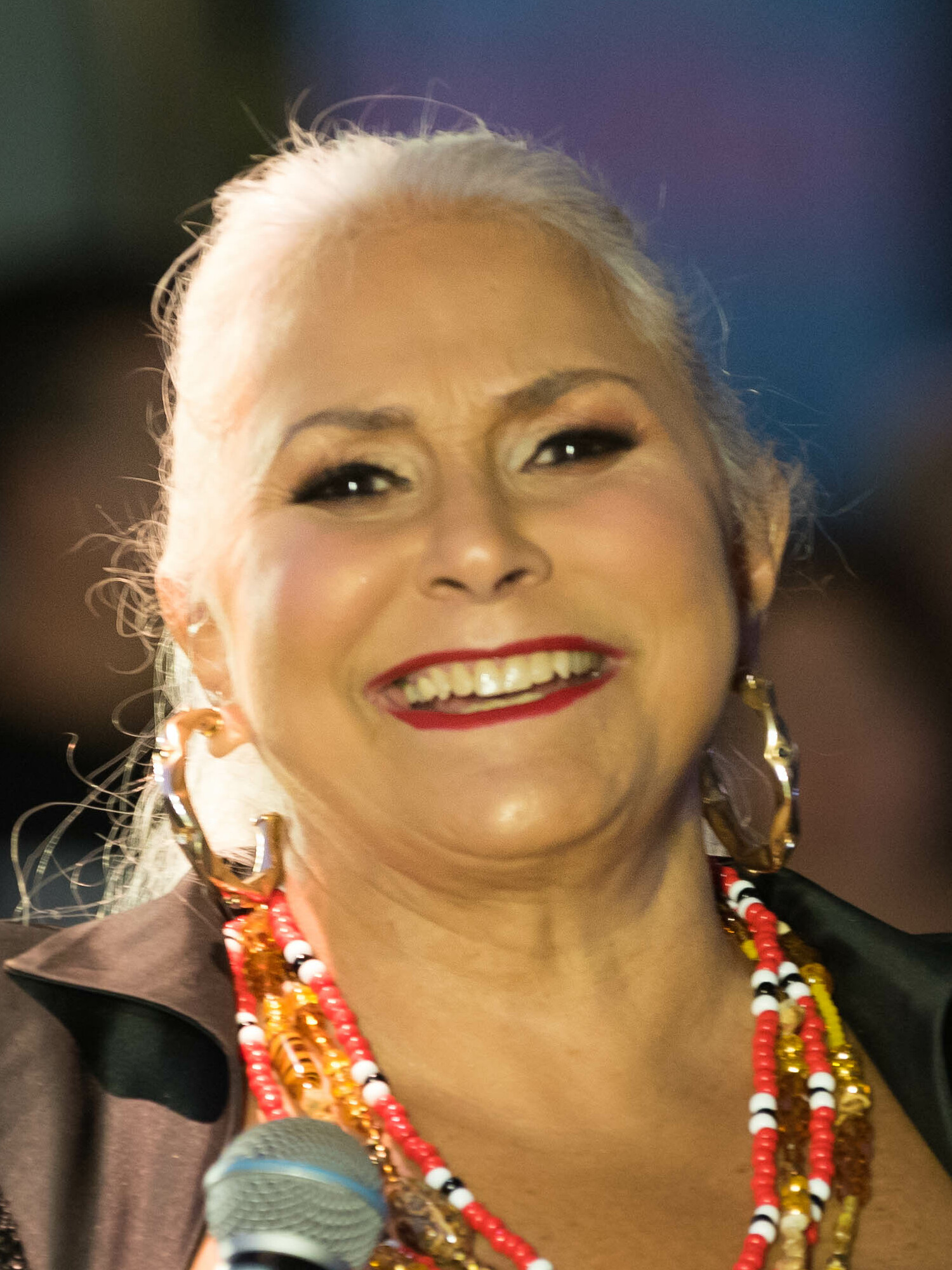
- Fafá in 2022

Background information
- Born: Maria de Fátima Palha de Figueiredo; August 9, 1956 (age 70)
- Origin: Belém do Pará, Pará, Brazil
- Genres: MPB; Carimbó; Fado; Sertanejo
- Occupations: Singer and actress
- Years active: 1973–present

Fafá de Belém, born Maria de Fátima Palha de Figueiredo in Belém, Pará on August 9, 1956, is a Brazilian singer considered one of the great female voices of Música Popular Brasileira (MPB).

She took her stage name from the city of her birth. In addition to a successful recording career that spans over three decades, she has been regarded as one of the great sex symbols of Brazilian pop music. Her husky Contralto voice is known for its extensive emotional range, from tender ballads and sensual love songs to Portuguese fados, energetic sambas and even lambadas.

== Biography ==
Born in Belém in 1956, she made her public debut in her home town in 1973. In the next year she performed shows with Zé Rodrix in Rio de Janeiro and with Sérgio Ricardo in Belém and Salvador da Bahia. In the same year she hit the charts with "Filho da Bahia", then recorded for the soundtrack of the TV Globo soap opera Gabriela; she also released her first single that year. In 1976 Fafá de Belém recorded her first LP; Tamba Tajá, which was praised by critics. In 1984 she became the muse of the movement in favour of free elections in Brazil, singing "Menestrel das Alagoas" (pt), written by Milton Nascimento and Fernando Brant, before a million people in Rio de Janeiro. In the same period her highly popular interpretation of the Brazilian National Anthem at mass gatherings got her into trouble with the ruling military regime that was soon replaced by a popularly elected president.

In 1993 her album Meu Fado went platinum in Portugal, one of the countries where she is widely popular. Though not a composer herself she has recorded memorable covers of Brazil's greatest composers, notably her all-Chico Buarque CD Tanto Mar released in 2004. Fafa's 2005 release Novo Millennium, a compilation of hits and some new material, sold 500,000 copies in its first month in stores.

Her album Humana was considered one of the 25 best Brazilian albums of the first half of 2019 by the São Paulo Association of Art Critics. In 2015, Do tamanho certo para o meu sorriso marks his 40th career anniversary, having been released after ten years without recording in studio. It is an album that celebrates Pará brega, bringing together classic songs and some unreleased ones, such as the track Asfalto Amarelo (Felipe Cordeiro, Manoel Cordeiro and Zeca Baleiro). In 2019, his album Humana was elected one of the 25 best Brazilian albums by the Paulista Association of Art Critics.

== Discography ==
- 1976 – Tamba-Tajá
- 1977 – Água
- 1978 – Banho de cheiro
- 1979 – Estrela radiante
- 1980 – Crença
- 1982 – Essential
- 1983 – Fafá de Belém
- 1985 – Aprendizes da esperança
- 1986 – Atrevida
- 1987 – Grandes amores
- 1988 – Sozinha
- 1989 – Fafá
- 1991 – Doces palavras
- 1992 – Meu fado
- 1993 – Do fundo do meu coração
- 1994 – Cantiga pra ninar meu namorado
- 1995 – Fafá – ao vivo
- 1996 – Pássaro sonhador
- 1998 – Coração brasileiro
- 2000 – Maria de Fátima Palha Figueiredo
- 2002 – Voz e piano – ao vivo
- 2002 – O canto das águas
- 2004 – Tanto mar – Fafá de Belém canta Chico Buarque
- 2007 – Fafá de Belém – ao vivo (CD e DVD)
- 2015 – Do Tamanho Certo para o Meu Sorriso
- 2017 – Do Tamanho Certo para o Meu Sorriso - Ao Vivo
- 2019 – Humana
