= WME Awards =

Brazilian music award for women

- Previous: WME Awards 2025; 17 December 2025; Next: WME Awards 2026; 15 December 2026
- Awarded for: Contributions to the Brazilian music industry by women
- Country: Brazil
- Presented by: Woman's Music Event
- First award: 28 November 2017; 8 years ago
- Website: premio.womensmusicevent.com.br

The Woman's Music Event Awards, or simply WME Awards, is an annual award show to recognize women in music in Brazil.

== History ==
The Woman's Music Event (WME), founded by Claudia Assef and Monique Dardenne in 2016, is a platform dedicated to music, business, and technology, with "the aim of becoming the central hub for events focused on the growing female music scene in Brazil." To recognize, Assef, Dardenne, and Fátima Pissarra teamed up to create the WME Awards, the first Brazilian music award dedicated to women. The first edition, promoted by Vevo Brasil, took place on 28 November 2017, in São Paulo. From 2018 to 2022, the ceremony was promoted by Music2!, a company founded by Pissarra. In 2023, the ceremony began to be promoted by magazine Billboard Brasil.

== Ceremonies ==
#	Date	Venue	City	Host(s)	Ref.
1st	28 November 2017	Cine Joia	São Paulo	Preta Gil	
2nd	4 December 2018	Cine Joia	São Paulo	Preta Gil	
3rd	3 December 2019	Audio	São Paulo	Preta Gil	
4th	8 December 2020	Ibirapuera Auditorium	São Paulo	Preta Gil and Karol Conká	
5th	16 December 2021	B32 Theater	São Paulo	Preta Gil	
6th	21 December 2022	Audio	São Paulo	Preta Gil	
7th	14 December 2023	Sérgio Cardoso Theater	São Paulo	Preta Gil and Larissa Luz	
8th	17 December 2024	Renault Theater	São Paulo	Luísa Sonza, Karol Conká and Paula Lima	
9th	17 December 2025	BTG Pactual Hall	São Paulo	Sarah Oliveira, Teresa Cristina and Karol Conká	
10th	15 December 2026	TBA	São Paulo	TBA	

== Categories ==
=== Votable categories ===
Winners of the following categories are chosen by fan votes.

- Album
- Singer
- DJ
- Alternative Song
- Latin-American Song
- Mainstream Song
- New Artist
- Show
- Music Video

=== Professional categories ===
The winners of the following categories are chosen by the WME Awards ambassadors.

- Songwriter
- Music Video Director
- Music Entrepreneur
- Instrumentalist
- Music Journalist
- Music Producer
- Radio Presenter

=== Special awards ===
- Artist of the Year: Ana Castela (2024)

=== Discontinued categories ===
- Best Song
- Popular Song
- Listen to the Girls
- Musical Live
- Innovation on the Web
- Girls for Reels!

== Honorees ==
- 2017: Rita Lee and Helena Meirelles
- 2018: Elza Soares and Dona Ivone Lara
- 2019: Gal Costa and Beth Carvalho
- 2020: Alcione and Elis Regina
- 2021: Sandra de Sá and Cássia Eller
- 2022: Elza Soares and Margareth Menezes
- 2023: Dona Onete and Rita Lee
- 2024: Lia de Itamaracá and Nara Leão
- 2025: Preta Gil
- 2026: Alaíde Costa

== See also ==
- Billboard Women in Music
