= WME Awards 2017 =

1st edition of the Woman's Music Event Awards

- Date: 28 November 2017
- Location: Cine Joia; São Paulo, Brazil
- Hosted by: Preta Gil
- Website: premio.womensmusicevent.com.br/2017/

Television/radio coverage
- Network: Facebook (Vevo Brasil); Music Box Brazil

The first WME Awards (Woman's Music Event Awards) were held at the Cine Joia, in São Paulo, Brazil on 28 November 2017. In partnership with Vevo Brasil, the ceremony recognized women in Brazilian music. The ceremony, broadcast on Vevo Brasil's Facebook page and the Music Box Brazil channel, was hosted by Preta Gil. Rita Lee and Helena Meirelles were honored.

== Winners and nominees ==
The nominees were announced on 3 October 2017. Winners are listed first and highlighted in bold.

=== Voted categories ===
The winners of the following categories were chosen by fan votes.

Best Album	Best Singer
**Eletrocardiograma – Flora Matos**; Bixa – As Bahias e a Cozinha Mineira; Em Noite de Climão – Letrux; Vem – Mallu Magalhães; Território Conquistado – Larissa Luz	**Karol Conká**; Elza Soares; Marília Mendonça; Anitta; Juçara Marçal
Best DJ	Best Music Video
**Cinara**; Anna; Cashu; Groove Delight; Badsista	**"Na Pele" – Elza Soares and Pitty**; "Lalá" – Karol Conká; "Lesbigay" – Aíla; "Cheguei" – Ludmilla; "Sua Cara" – Major Lazer featuring Anitta and Pabllo Vittar
New Artist of the Year	Best Song
**Iza**; Luiza Lian; Xenia França; Anavitória; Linn da Quebrada	**"Lalá" – Karol Conká**; "Loka" – Simone & Simaria featuring Anitta; "Paradinha" – Anitta; "Você Não Presta" – Mallu Magalhães; "Fica" – Anavitória featuring Matheus & Kauan

=== Professional categories ===
The winners of the following categories were chosen by the WME Awards ambassadors.

Music Video Director	Music Entrepreneur
**Vera Egito**; Camila Cornelsen; Gabi Jacob; Kátia Lund; Paula Gaitán	**Eliane Dias**; Fabiana Batistela; Anitta; Ana Garcia; Tiê
Instrumentalist	Music Journalist
**Mahmundi**; Larissa Conforto; Anna Tréa; Lan Lanh; Badi Assad	**Roberta Martinelli**; Claudia Assef; Patricia Palumbo; Gaia Passarelli; Debora Pill
Music Producer	Radio Presenter
**Letrux**; Mahmundi; Érica Alves; Badsista; Anna	**Patricia Palumbo**; Roberta Martinelli; Debora Pill; Fabiane Pereira; Sandra Carraro
Best Show
**Elza Soares – A Mulher do Fim do Mundo**; Marília Mendonça – Raridade; Tássia Reis – Outra Esfera; Karol Conká – Rock in Rio 2017; Ivete Sangalo – Rock in Rio 2017
