= WME Awards 2023 =

7th edition of the Woman's Music Event Awards

- Date: 14 December 2023
- Location: Sérgio Cardoso Theater; São Paulo, Brazil
- Hosted by: Preta Gil
- Website: premio.womensmusicevent.com.br/2023/

Television/radio coverage
- Network: UOL

The WME Awards 2023 were held at the Sérgio Cardoso Theater, in São Paulo, Brazil on 14 December 2023. In partnership with Billboard Brasil magazine for the first time, the ceremony recognized women in Brazilian music. The ceremony was hosted by Preta Gil and Larissa Luz. Gil hosted the show for the seventh consecutive time, while this was Luz's first hosting stint. The ceremony was broadcast by UOL. Dona Onete and Rita Lee were honored.

== Winners and nominees ==
The nominees were announced on 7 November 2023. Winners are listed first and highlighted in bold.

=== Popular vote ===
The winners of the following categories were chosen by fan votes.

Album	Singer
**Vício Inerente – Marina Sena**; Afrodhit – Iza; Habilidades Extraordinárias – Tulipa Ruiz; Meu Esquema – Rachel Reis; Escândalo Íntimo – Luísa Sonza	**Liniker**; Marina Sena; Iza; Simone Mendes; Ana Castela
DJ	Alternative Song
**Afrolai**; Sophia; Carola; Kenya20hz; Miss Tacacá	**"99 Problemas" – Duquesa featuring MC Luanna**; "Electric Fish" – Ana Frango Elétrico; "Arrepiada" – Julia Mestre; "As Feras, Essas Queridas" – Letrux; "Homenagem" – Luiza Lian
Latin American Song	Mainstream Song
**"Funk Rave" – Anitta**; "TQG" – Karol G and Shakira; "Moonlight" – Kali Uchis; "No Se Ve" – Emilia and Ludmilla; "Garra Latina" – Bea Issler	**"Chico" – Luísa Sonza**; "Fé nas Malucas" – Iza and MC Carol; "Sintomas de Prazer" – Ludmilla; "Erro Gostoso" – Simone Mendes; "Seu Brilho Sumiu" – Mari Fernandes
New Artist	Show
**Uana**; Duquesa; Gabi Martins; Vivi; Karinah	**Ludmilla**; Luedji Luna; Mari Fernandes; Kaê Guajajara; Marina Sena
Music Video
**"Fé nas Malucas" – Iza and MC Carol**; "Campo de Morango" – Luísa Sonza; "Noites Tropicais" – Mahmundi; "Tudo Pra Amar Você" – Marina Sena; "Sou Má" – Ludmilla featuring Tasha & Tracie

=== Technical vote ===
The winners of the following categories were chosen by the WME Awards ambassadors.

Songwriter	Music Video Director
**Luedji Luna**; Carolzinha; Jenni Mosello; King Saints; Pamela Maranhão	**Aisha Mbikila**; Belle de Melo; Camila Cornelsen; Az Brunas; Laís Dantas
Music Entrepreneur	Instrumentalist
**Tania Artur**; Beatriz Almeida; Miria Alves; Jaqueline Fernandes; Deh Muss	**Karollzinha Sanfoneira**; Michele Cordeiro; Fernanda Maia; Maíra Freitas; Carol Mathias
Music Journalist	Music Producer
**Kenya Sade**; Isabela Yu; Gabrielle Neves; Láisa Naiane; Dora Guerra	**Ana Frango Elétrico**; Larinhx; Amanda Magalhães; Clementaum; Suyá Synergy
Professional of the Year	Radio Presenter
**Bia Wolf**; Drica Lara; Cris Falcão; Leticia Santos; Carolina Alzuguir	**Sarah Mascarenhas**; Ana Pimentah; Vany Américo; Denise Oliveira; Bia Sato
