= Roberta Martinelli =

Brazilian journalist and radio presenter

- Born: December 31, 1981; São Paulo, São Paulo, Brazil
- Education: Fundação Armando Alvares Penteado
- Occupations: TV presenter radio personality

Roberta Martinelli Iorio (31 December 1981) is a Brazilian jounalist, TV presenter and radio presenter. She currently presents the programme Cultura Livre on TV Cultura and Som a Pino on Eldorado FM.

== Biography ==
Of Italian descent, Roberta was born in the city of São Paulo. She studied law for four years but dropped out in her final year as she couldn’t see herself working in the profession. After dropping out of law school, she was invited to play the Girl from Ipanema in a musical paying tribute to the work of Vinicius de Moraes. Following her experience in the play, she decided to enroll on the play course at the Célia Helena Centre for Arts and Education, a drama school located in the Itaim Bibi neighbourhood of São Paulo. She also studied on the Radio and TV course at Fundação Armando Álvares Penteado (FAAP).

Whilst she was studying at FAAP, she began working as an intern at Rádio Cultura AM, run by the Padre Anchieta Foundation. On the radio, she realised that the station was dedicated to playing Brazilian popular music (MPB), but only by established artists such as Caetano Veloso, Chico Buarque, Gal Costa, Elza Soares and Maria Bethânia. During that same period, a new MPB movement was in full swing on the São Paulo night scene, at clubs in Vila Madalena, where artists such as Tulipa Ruiz, Marcelo Jeneci, Lulina and Romulo Fróes were performing. With this in mind, she decided to start featuring new artists on the radio programme schedule. She devised the programme Cultura Livre, which began airing on Rádio Cultura AM, showcasing new artists from the Brazilian popular music scene, as well as featuring established names such as Elza Soares and Tom Zé. In 2011, the programme was adapted for TV Cultura. The programme has been running for more than 15 seasons and is still on TV. She also presents the programme Prelúdio on TV Cultura, which is dedicated to classical music, alongside the conductor Júlio Medaglia.

In July 2016, the programme Som a Pino made its debut on Eldorado FM radio. That same year, he became a columnist for Caderno 2, a supplement of the newspaper O Estado de S.Paulo. The column ran until November 2019. Following the station’s temporary closure in 2026, the programme went off air, returning as soon as the radio station resumed broadcasting.

From 2018 onwards, she began hosting a podcast on the streaming platform Deezer, called Essenciais. In late 2019, Essenciais was nominated in the podcast category at the APCA Awards. In 2021, the original Spotify podcast Nós premiered, co-hosted by Sarah Oliveira. In 2025, she wrote the book Letrux: Em noite de climão, about the singer’s album Letrux em Noite de Climão.

== Filmography ==
=== Television ===
Year	Production	Position	Station	Ref.
2011–present	Cultura Livre	Host	TV Cultura	
2013–present	Prelúdio	Host	TV Cultura	
2026–present	Bem Brasil	Interviewer	TV Cultura	

=== Radio ===
Year	Production	Position	Station	Ref.
2011–present	Cultura Livre	Host	Rádio Cultura Brasil	
2016–present	Som a Pino	Host	Eldorado FM	

=== Clips ===
Year	Song	Artist	Ref.
2013	Gasolina	Pedro Granato	

== Books ==
- Letrux: Em noite de climão. Editora Cobogó: São Paulo, 2025.

== Personal life ==
She was in a relationship with the musician Pedro Granato. She is a SC Corinthians Paulista supporter. In the 2026 presidential election, she declared her support for Lula’s (PT) candidacy.

== Prizes ==
Year	Prize	Category	Venue	Result	Ref.
2017	WME Awards	Music journalist	Cine Joia, São Paulo, São Paulo, Brazil	Won	
2017	WME Awards	Radio Presenter	Cine Joia, São Paulo, São Paulo, Brazil	Nominated	
2018	WME Awards	Music journalist	Cine Joia, São Paulo, São Paulo, Brazil	Nominated	
2018	WME Awards	Radio Presenter	Cine Joia, São Paulo, São Paulo, Brazil	Won	
2019	APCA Television Award	Podcast	Teatro Sérgio Cardoso, São Paulo, São Paulo, Brazil	Nominated	
2020	WME Awards	Radio Presenter	Ibirapuera Auditorium, São Paulo, São Paulo, Brazil	Nominated	
2024	WME Awards	Radio Presenter	Renault Theater, São Paulo, São Paulo, Brazil	Won	
