= WME Awards 2024 =

8th edition of the Woman's Music Event Awards

- Date: 17 December 2024
- Location: Renault Theater; São Paulo, Brazil
- Hosted by: Karol Conká; Luísa Sonza; Paula Lima

Highlights
- Most awards: Liniker; Luísa Sonza (2 each)
- Most nominations: Luísa Sonza (4)
- Website: premio.womensmusicevent.com.br/2024/

Television/radio coverage
- Network: YouTube

The WME Awards 2024 were held at the Renault Theater, in São Paulo, Brazil on 17 December 2024. In partnership with Billboard Brasil magazine, the ceremony recognized women in Brazilian music. The ceremony was hosted by Karol Conká, Luísa Sonza and Paula Lima. Conká hosted the show for the second time, while it marked the first time for Sonza and Lima in this role. This was the first ceremony without Preta Gil as the host after seven consecutive years in the role. Lia de Itamaracá and Nara Leão were honored.

== Winners and nominees ==
The nominees were announced on 24 October 2024. Luísa Sonza received the most nominations with four, followed by Liniker and Ludmilla with three nominations each. Liniker and Sonza were the most awarded with two awards each. Winners are listed first and highlighted in bold.

=== Popular vote ===
The winners of the following categories were chosen by fan votes.

Album	Singer
**Caju – Liniker**; Prece – Luiza Brina; Priscilla – Priscilla; Tara e Tal – Duda Beat; Taurus, Vol 2. – Duquesa	**Luísa Sonza**; Ana Castela; Liniker; Ludmilla; Luedji Luna
DJ	Alternative Song
**Clementaum**; Carola; From House to Disco; Lala K; Rafa Jazz	**"Você Parece com Vergonha" – Ajuliacosta**; "10 Minutos" – Melly; "100 Mili" – Ebony featuring Larinhx; "Bling Bling" – Katú Mirim; "Só Um Tempo" – Tássia Reis
Latin American Song	Mainstream Song
**"Alibi" – Sevdaliza, Pabllo Vittar and Yseult**; "Flores Pa Ti" – Becky G, Luísa Sonza and Papatinho; "Mil Veces" – Anitta; "Nace Una Madre" – Perota Chingó; "Si Antes Te Hubiera Conocido" – Karol G	**"Caju" – Liniker**; "Daqui Pra Sempre" – Manu Bahtidão e Simone Mendes; "Macetando" – Ivete Sangalo and Ludmilla; "Maliciosa" – Ludmilla; "Sagrado Profano" – Luísa Sonza
New Artist	Show
**Zaynara**; Ajuliacosta; Jovem MK; Joyce Alana; Sued Nunes	**Luísa Sonza**; Juliana Linhares; Lia de Itamaracá; Luedji Luna; Simone Mendes
Music Video
**"Saudade de Você" – Duda Beat**; "Dizem Que Sou Louca" – Mari Fernandez; "Ensolarada" – Rachel Reis; "Nu" – Assuscena; "Tentativa Frustrada" – Michele Andrade e Priscila Senna

=== Technical vote ===
The winners of the following categories were chosen by the WME Awards ambassadors.

Songwriter	Music Video Director
**Melly**; Elana Dara; Jenni Mosello; Luiza Brina; Sued Nunes	**Joyce Prado**; Aisha Mbikila; Fernanda Correrua; Lu Villaça; Nídia Aranha
Music Entrepreneur	Instrumentalist
**Adriana Barbosa**; Erika Morais; Julianna Sá; Renné Chalu; Simone Marçal	**Josyara**; Ana Karina Sebastião; Alana Ananias; Alana Gabriela; Aline Gonçalves
Music Journalist	Music Producer
**Fabiane Pereira**; Djuena Tikuna; Foquinha; Isabela Yu; Kamille Viola	**Ana Frango Elétrico**; Amanda Magalhães; Ayla On The Beach; Iamlop$$; Larinhx
Professional of the Year	Radio Presenter
**Michelly Mury**; Ana GB; Cris Falcão; Cris Simões; Sandra Jimenez	**Roberta Martinelli**; Gabriele Alves; Juliana Molino; Mara Régia; Val Becker

=== Special awards ===
Ana Castela was announced as the recipient of the Artist of the Year.

Artist of the Year
- **Ana Castela**
