= WME Awards 2018 =

2nd edition of the Woman's Music Event Awards

- Date: 4 December 2018
- Location: Cine Joia; São Paulo, Brazil
- Hosted by: Preta Gil
- Website: premio.womensmusicevent.com.br/2018/

Television/radio coverage
- Network: Facebook (Skol); Music Box Brazil

The WME Awards 2018 were held at the Cine Joia, in São Paulo, Brazil on 4 December 2018. In partnership with Music2!, the ceremony recognized women in Brazilian music. Hosted by Preta Gil for the second time, the ceremony was broadcast on Skol's Facebook page and the Music Box Brazil channel. Elza Soares and Dona Ivone Lara were honored.

== Winners and nominees ==
Winners are listed first and highlighted in bold.

=== Voted categories ===
The winners of the following categories were chosen by fan votes.

Best Album	Best Singer
**Dona de Mim – Iza**; Um Corpo no Mundo – Luedji Luna; Taurina – Anelis Assumpção; Alice – Alice Caymmi; O Tempo É Agora – Anavitória	**Elza Soares**; Luedji Luna; Ludmilla; Iza; Marília Mendonça
Best DJ	Best Music Video
**DJ Donna**; Badsista; Cashu; Devochka; Mayra Maldjian	**"Vá se Benzer" – Preta Gil**; "Pra Que Me Chama" – Xênia França; "Dona de Mim" – Iza; "Banzeiro" – Daniela Mercury; "Além de Cavalos" – Letrux
New Artist of the Year	Best Song
**Luísa Sonza**; Clau; Maria Beraldo; Duda Beat; Bia Ferreira	**"Pesadão" – Iza**; "Paga de Feliz" – Simone & Simaria; "Nas Escola" – Elza Soares; "Vai Malandra" – Anitta; "Amuleto" – Tiê

=== Professional categories ===
The winners of the following categories were chosen by the WME Awards ambassadors.

Best Music Video Director	Music Entrepreneur
**Joyce Prado**; Laura Diaz; Virginia de Ferrante; Joana Mazzuccheli; Tata Pierry	**Fabiana Batistela**; Veronica Pessoa; Tati Falcão; Ana Morena Tavares; Daniela Rodrigues
Best Instrumentalist	Best Music Journalist
**Maria Beraldo**; Anna Tréa; Mônica Agena; Mariá Portugal; Mulamba	**Adriana Couto**; Roberta Martinelli; Patrícia Palumbo; Amanda Cavalcanti; Débora Pill
Best Music Producer	Best Radio Presenter
**BadSista**; Maria Beraldo; Flora Matos; Mônica Agena; Luana Hansen	**Roberta Martinelli**; Patrícia Palumbo; Jany Lima; Sarah Oliveira; Fabiana Ferraz
Best Show
**Letrux**; Luiza Lian; Xênia França; Marília Mendonça; Solange Almeida
