= WME Awards 2020 =

4th edition of the Woman's Music Event Awards

- Date: 8 December 2020
- Location: Ibirapuera Auditorium; São Paulo, Brazil
- Hosted by: Preta Gil; Karol Conká
- Website: premio.womensmusicevent.com.br/2020/

Television/radio coverage
- Network: TNT

The WME Awards 2020 were held at the Ibirapuera Auditorium, in São Paulo, Brazil on 8 December 2020. In partnership with Music2!, the ceremony recognized women in Brazilian music. Broadcast by TNT, the ceremony was hosted by Preta Gil and Karol Conká. Gil hosted the show for the fourth consecutive time, while this was Conká's first hosting stint. Alcione and Elis Regina were honored.

== Winners and nominees ==
The nominees were announced on 10 November 2020, by Sarah Oliveira, Fátima Pissarra, Claudia Assef and Monique Dardenne. Winners are listed first and highlighted in bold.

=== Popular vote ===
The winners of the following categories were chosen by fan votes.

Album	Singer
**Bom Mesmo É Estar Debaixo D'Água – Luedji Luna**; Perfume – Daniela Mercury; Lexa – Lexa; Corpo sem Juízo – Jup do Bairro; Mundo Novo – Mahmundi	**Elza Soares**; Marília Mendonça; Anitta; Luedji Luna; Luísa Sonza
DJ	Live Musical
**Tamy Reis**; Eli Iwasa; Tata Ogan; Lys Ventura; Milian Dolla	**Simone & Simaria**; Luísa Sonza; Ivete Sangalo; Marília Mendonça; Solange and Márcia Fellipe
Alternative Song	Mainstream Song
**"Tentação" – Drik Barbosa and Àttooxxá**; "Duas Águas" – Ju Strassacapa; "Bom Mesmo É Estar Debaixo D'Água" – Luedji Luna; "Você é do Mal" – As Baías and Cleo; "Déjà Vu Frenesi" – Letrux	**"Braba" – Luísa Sonza**; "Me Gusta – Anitta featuring Cardi B and Myke Towers; "O Amor Que Tu Perdeu" – Mila and MC Jottapê; "Deve Ser Horrível Dormir Sem Mim" – Manu Gavassi and Gloria Groove; "Menina Solta" – Giulia Be
New Artist	Music Video
**Tainá Costa**; Jup do Bairro; Agnes Nunes; Carol & Vitoria; Souto MC	**"Deve Ser Horrível Dormir Sem Mim" – Manu Gavassi and Gloria Groove**; "Corpocontinente – Céu; "Dollar Euro" – Tássia Reis featuring Monna Brutal; "Combatchy" – Anitta, Lexa and Luísa Sonza featuring MC Rebecca; "Braba" – Luísa Sonza

=== Technical vote ===
The winners of the following categories were chosen by the WME Awards ambassadors.

Songwriter	Music Video Director
**Waleria Leão**; Letrux; Lari Ferreira; Céu; Luedji Luna	**Camila Tuon**; Sabrina Duarte; Nina Torres; Belle de Melo; Joyce Prado
Music Entrepreneur	Innovation on the Web
**Flavia Cesar**; Heloisa Aidar; Dani Rodrigues; Luciana Simões; Nicole Balestro	**Lives Teresa Cristina**; UH! Manas TV; Bivolt Experiência Interativa 110v e 220v; Festival Sarará 2020; Festival No Ar Coquetel Molotov 2020
Instrumentalist	Music Journalist
**Lan Lanh**; Érica Silva; Michele Cordeiro; Silvanny Sivuca; Maira Freitas	**Lorena Calabria**; Kamille Viola; Adriana Barros; Isabela Yu; Patricia Palumbo
Live Musical	Music Producer
**Elza Soares – Jazz**; Gal Costa – 75 Anos; Mariana Aydar – Ao Vivo na Casa de Francisca; Tulipa Ruiz – Noire; Ana Cañas – Canta Belchior	**Ana Frango Elétrico**; Malka Julieta; Natália Carrera; Ráae; Vivian Kuczynski
Radio Presenter
**Sarah Oliveira (Eldorado FM)**; Fabiane Pereira (Faro MPB); Roberta Martinelli (Eldorado FM); Patricia Palumbo (Rádio Vozes); Sheila Campos (Rádio Cultura FM)
