= WME Awards 2019 =

3rd edition of the Woman's Music Event Awards

- Date: 3 December 2019
- Location: Audio; São Paulo, Brazil
- Hosted by: Preta Gil
- Most nominations: Pitty (4)
- Website: premio.womensmusicevent.com.br/2019/

Television/radio coverage
- Network: TNT

The WME Awards 2019 were held at the Audio, in São Paulo, Brazil on 3 December 2019. In partnership with Music2!, the ceremony recognized women in Brazilian music of the eligibility year, which ran from August 2018 to August 2019. Preta Gil hosted the ceremony for the third time. It was broadcast by TNT for the first time. Gal Costa and Beth Carvalho were honored.

== Performers ==
| Artist(s) | Song(s) |
|---|---|
| Pitty | "Noite Inteira" |
| Pocah Deize Tigrona MC Rebecca | "Não Sou Obrigada" "Injeção" "Ao Som de 150" |
| Luana Carvalho Nilze Carvalho Mãeana | Tribute to Beth Carvalho "As Rosas Não Falam" "Folhas Secas" "Vou Festejar" |
| Luiza Lian Céu | "Sou Yabá" "Coreto" |
| Katú Mirim Kaê Guajajara | "Resistência" "Mãos Vermelhas" |
| Yasmin Santos Luísa Sonza | "Para, Pensa e Volta" "Eliane" |
| Duda Beat Gaby Amarantos | "Bixinho" "Xanalá" |
| Ana Cañas Preta Gil Cleo As Bahias e a Cozinha Mineira Aíla | Tribute to Gal Costa "Barato Total" "Vaca Profana" "Brasil" |

== Winners and nominees ==
The nominees were announced on 17 October 2019. Pitty received the most nominations with four, followed by Duda Beat, Karina Buhr and Luiza Lian with three each. Winners are listed first and highlighted in bold.

=== Voted categories ===
The winners of the following categories were chosen by fan votes.

| Best Album | Best Singer |
|---|---|
| **O Tempo É Agora – Anavitória**; Matriz – Pitty; Verdade – Lauana Prado; Azul Moderno – Luiza Lian; APKÁ – Céu | **Pitty**; Iza; As Bahias e a Cozinha Mineira; Ludmilla; Céu |
| Best DJ | Best Popular Song |
| **Anna**; Badsista; Cashu; Ice Cream Girls; Eli Iwasa | **"Boa Menina" – Luísa Sonza**; "Bebi Liguei" – Marília Mendonça; "Não Sou Obrigada" – Pocah; "Onda Diferente" – Anitta, Ludmilla and Snoop Dogg featuring Papatinho; "Para, Pensa e Volta" – Yasmin Santos |
| Best Alternative Song | Best Music Video |
| **"Noite Inteira" – Pitty**; "Rito de Passá" – MC Tha; "Bichinho" – Duda Beat; "Sou Yabá" – Luiza Lian; "Margem" – Adriana Calcanhotto | **"Brisa" – Iza**; "Mil Mulheres" – Luiza Lian; "Ninguém É de Ninguém" – Pitty; "Nave" – Xênia França; "Garupa" – Luísa Sonza featuring Pabllo Vittar |
New Artist
**Yasmin Santos**; Malía; MC Tha; Giulia Be; Tuyo

=== Professional categories ===
The winners of the following categories were chosen by the WME Awards ambassadors.

| Best Songwriter | Best Music Video Director |
|---|---|
| **Tulipa Ruiz**; Duda Beat; Bibi; Karina Buhr; Wynnie Nogueira | **Gabi Jacob**; Joyce Prado; Aline Lata; Ellen Faria; Camila Maluhy |
| Entrepreneur of the Year | Best Instrumentalist |
| **Ana Garcia**; Cris Falcão; Amanda Oliveira; Guta Braga; Fabiana Batistela | **Karina Buhr**; Josyara; Jadsa; Sintia Piccin; Alessandra Leão |
| Best Music Journalist | Best Music Producer |
| **Fabiane Pereira**; Kamille Viola; Adriana Couto; Danila Moura; Adriana de Barros | **Mahmundi**; Erica; Mônica Agena; Malka; Apuke Beat |
| Best Radio Presenter | Best Show |
| **Luka**; Patricia Dinis; Isabela Azevedo; Fabiane Pereira; Erica Saraiva | **Duda Beat**; Karina Buhr; Marília Mendonça; Anavitória; Maria Bethânia |
Listen to the Girls
**Josyara**; Raissa Fayet; Jéssica Caitano; Nina Oliveira; Ana Frango Elétrico
