= Caju (album) =

2024 studio album by Liniker

Studio album by Liniker
- Released: 19 August 2024
- Recorded: 2022–2024
- Studios: Arsis; Audiorama; Brocal; Cada Instante; Central; Kumbuka; Ma'Ninja; Mosh; NaCena; Ori; Seven Life; Soundz; SPA Music; The Hive
- Length: 69:08
- Label: Breu Entertainment
- Producers: Liniker; Fejuca; Gustavo Ruiz

Liniker chronology
Indigo Borboleta Anil (2021)	Caju (2024)

Singles from Caju
- 1. "Tudo" Released: 11 July 2024; 2. "Caju" Released: 29 November 2024; 3. "Febre" Released: 11 March 2025; 4. "Pote de Ouro" Released: 6 October 2025

Caju is the second studio album by Brazilian singer-songwriter Liniker, released on 19 August 2024, through Breu Entertainment. Liniker produced the album with Fejuca and Gustavo Ruiz.

"Tudo" was released as lead single. Caju received generally positive reviews and commercial success upon release. Many publications ranked it among the best albums of the 2024. It won Multishow Brazilian Music Award for Album of the Year. Caju and its tracks received seven nominations at the 26th Annual Latin Grammy Awards, including Album of the Year. To support the album, Liniker embarked on the Caju Tour, between November 2024 and December 2025, and on the Bye Bye Caju tour, between May and November 2026.

== Release and promotion ==
Liniker released "Tudo" as the lead single on 11 July 2024. She announced Caju on 12 August 2024, reveling the album cover, release date and track listing. Caju was released digitally on 19 August 2024, by Breu Entertainment. Liniker announced the Caju Tour on 2 September 2024. A "Trop Version" of the title track was released on 29 November 2024.

== Critical reception ==
Billboard Brasil's Yuri da BS described Caju as a patient and delicate album, in which Liniker reinforces her artistic complexity and leaves 2024 Brazilian pop in a more "interesting and loving" way.

=== Year-end lists ===
Select year-end rankings of Caju
Publication	List	Rank	Ref.
Noize	The 50 Best Brazilian Albums of 2024	–	
Omelete	Top 10 Best Albums of 2024	1	
Rolling Stone Brasil	The 10 Best Brazilian Albums of 2024	1	
Tenho Mais Discos Que Amigos!	The 50 Best Brazilian Albums of 2024	1	
Tracklist	The 30 Best Brazilian and International Albums of 2024	1	

== Accolades ==
Awards and nominations for Caju
Organization	Year	Category	Result	Ref.
Brazilian Music Awards	2025	Pop Release	Won	
Latin Grammy Awards	2025	Album of the Year	Nominated	
Latin Grammy Awards	2025	Best Portuguese Language Contemporary Pop Album	Won	
Latin Grammy Awards	2025	Best Engineered Album	Nominated	
Multishow Brazilian Music Awards	2024	Album of the Year	Won	
Multishow Brazilian Music Awards	2024	Album Cover of the Year	Won	
SEC Awards	2025	Album/EP of the Year	Nominated	
WME Awards	2024	Album	Won	

== Commercial performance ==
Caju was a commercial success. On Spotify, it amassed six million streams in the first 24 hours. Three songs from the album debuted on the Billboard Brasil Hot 100; "Caju" (30), "Tudo" (59) and "Veludo Marrom" (82).

== Track listing ==
Caju track listing
No.	Title	Writer(s)	Producer(s)	Length
1.	"Caju"	Liniker; Fejuca; Gustavo Ruiz; Iuri Rio Branco	Liniker; Fejuca; Ruiz; Rio Branco	4:26
2.	"Tudo"	Liniker; Fejuca; Ruiz; Nave	Liniker; Fejuca; Ruiz; Nave	3:34
3.	"Veludo Marrom"	Liniker	Liniker; Fejuca; Ruiz	7:17
4.	"Ao Teu Lado" (with Amaro Freitas and Anavitória)	Liniker; Amaro Freitas	Liniker; Fejuca; Ruiz	7:11
5.	"Me Ajude a Salvar os Domingos"	Liniker	Liniker; Fejuca; Ruiz	7:17
6.	"Negona dos Olhos Terríveis" (with BaianaSystem)	Liniker; Russo Passapusso; Beto Barreto; Fejuca; Ruiz	Liniker; Fejuca; Ruiz; Seko Bass	5:10
7.	"Mayonga"	Liniker	Liniker; Fejuca; Ruiz	2:12
8.	"Papo de Edredom" (with Melly)	Liniker; Melly	Liniker; Fejuca; Ruiz	3:12
9.	"Popstar"	Liniker	Liniker; Fejuca; Ruiz	5:01
10.	"Febre"	Liniker	Liniker; Fejuca; Ruiz	4:58
11.	"Pote de Ouro" (with Priscila Senna)	Liniker; Marcio Arantes	Liniker; Fejuca; Ruiz; Marcio Arantes	3:58
12.	"Deixa Estar" (with Lulu Santos and Pabllo Vittar)	Liniker	Liniker; Fejuca; Ruiz	5:06
13.	"So Special" (with Tropkillaz)	Liniker; Fejuca; Ruiz; Laudz; Zegon	Liniker; Fejuca; Ruiz; Tropkillaz; Apu	4:58
14.	"Take Your Time e Relaxa"	Liniker	Liniker; Fejuca; Ruiz	4:40
Total length:				69:08

== Charts ==
Weekly chart performance for Caju
Chart (2024)	Peak position
Portuguese Albums (AFP)	30

== Certifications ==
Certifications for Caju
Region	Certification	Certified units/sales
Brazil (Pro-Música Brasil)	Gold	40,000^{‡}
^{‡} Sales+streaming figures based on certification alone.
