= Afrodhit =

Studio album by IZA
- Released: 3 August 2023
- Recorded: 2023
- Genres: R&B; pop; trap
- Length: 40:29
- Language: Portuguese
- Label: Warner Music Brazil

IZA chronology
Três (2022)	Afrodhit (2023)

Singles from Afrodhit
- 1. "Fé nas Malucas" Released: 27 July 2023

Afrodhit is the second studio album by Brazilian singer-songwriter IZA. The album was released on August 3, 2023, through Warner Music Brazil.

The singer revealed that in February 2023 she discarded an album that was completely ready, and made a new one in about 5 months. The album features several collaborations such as Djonga, King, L7nnon, MC Carol, Russo Passapusso and Tiwa Savage. The album debuted in the Top 3 of the global Spotify chart from August 4 to 6, 2023.

== Background ==
After the release of the album Dona de Mim, on June 3, 2021, the singer released the song "Gueto", a song that exalts the culture of the periphery, which would be the first single from her second studio album, the video clip was released on next day being inspired by the 2000s and the North Zone, bringing references to Olaria, the neighborhood from which it was born. She later released the singles "Sem Filtro" and "Fé" between 2021 and 2022, which would also be part of the album. In March 2022, she also released live previews of other songs from the album, which were also discarded.

In September 2022, Iza released an EP of three songs: "Mole", "Mó Paz" and "Droga" that would also be part of the album. Called 'Três', the project became a promotion for the singer's performance on the main stage of Rock in Rio 2022, which became the first black Brazilian singer to perform on the world stage.

Later, the singer revealed that she discarded the album that was finished: "Those songs no longer represented me anymore. My voice [now] is more serious, because my voice is more serious, that shadow in the voice is my mark, my fingerprint. How strong this is, right? How much I didn't use my voice 100% because, sometimes, when I was in the studio, whoever was recording in the studio didn't like it and cut me off".

The first single from the album "Fé nas Malucas" in collaboration with MC Carol was released on July 27, 2023. After her participation in Fantástico on July 30, 2023, Iza revealed the album cover and the release date: July 3 August 2023. The next day she revealed all the tracks on the album.

== Promotion ==
=== Singles ===
On July 24, Iza released "Fé nas Malucas" through social networks, the first single from the project in partnership with MC Carol. The song was made available on digital platforms on July 27 and the respective music video was released on the same day on YouTube.

=== Tour ===
Iza stated that the tour for her second studio album starts with a show at the first edition of The Town festival, on September 10.

== Critical reception ==
Mauro Ferreira from G1, gave the album 3.5 stars, choosing the track "Uma Vida é Pouco pra Te Amar" as the best on the album.

== Track listing ==
Afrodhit track listing
No.	Title	Writer(s)	Producer(s)	Length
1.	"Nunca Mais"	Iza; Douglas Moda; Carolzinha; Jenni Mosello; Paiva; King	Douglas Moda; We4 Music; Paiva	4:05
2.	"Fé nas Maluca" (featuring MC Carol)	Iza; André Nine; Carolzinha; D. Moda; J. Mosello; King; Carolina Lourenço; Nox	A. Nine; D. Moda; Nox	2:23
3.	"Que Se Vá"	Iza; D. Moda; Carolzinha; J. Mosello; Paiva; Lucas Vaz	D. Moda; Lucas Vaz; We4 Music	2:24
4.	"Tédio"	Iza; D. Moda; Carolzinha; J. Mosello; King; Lary; Nox; A. Nine	A. Nine; Nox	2:51
5.	"Mega da Virada" (featuring Russo Passapusso)	Iza; D. Moda; André Vieira; Breder; Wallace Viana; Ruxell; Pablo Bispo; Gondim; Multi; Klismman; Romeu R3; Russo Passapusso; Tállia	D. Moda; We4 Music; Pablo Bispo; Ruxell	3:44
6.	"Batucada"	Iza; D. Moda; Carolzinha; J. Mosello; King; Lary; L. Vaz	D. Moda; L. Vaz; We4 Music	2:48
7.	"Boombasstic" (featuring King)	Iza; D. Moda; Carolzinha; J. Mosello; King; Lary; King Floyd; Robert Livington; Pepe; Orville Burrell	D. Moda; We4 Music; Pep Starling	3:27
8.	"Terê"	Iza; D. Moda; J. Mosello; King; Lary; Papatinho	Papatinho	2:31
9.	"Fiu Fiu" (featuring L7nnon)	Iza; D. Moda; J. Mosello; King; Lary; Papatinho	Papatinho	3:24
10.	"Sintoniza" (featuring Djonga)	Iza; D. Moda; J. Mosello; Hodari; King; Luccas Carlos; Nave; Red; Djonga; Cyclope	D. Moda; We4 Music; Cyclope; Nave; Red	2:58
11.	"Bomzão" (featuring Tiwa Savage)	Iza; D. Moda; J. Mosello; Jweezy; Kassim Kehinde Adeoye; Kassim Taiwo Temilade; King; Lary; Mystro; Tiwa Savage	D. Moda; We4 Music; Mystro	3:09
12.	"Exclusiva"	Iza; D. Moda; Carolzinha; J. Mosello; King; Vitão	D. Moda; We4 Music	3:13
13.	"Uma Vida É Pouco Para Te Amar"	João Moreira; Pedro Baby; Pretinho da Serrinha; Rachel Luz	Nave; Fejuca	3:32

Notes

- "Boombasstic" contains a sample of "Boombastic" (1995) by Jamaican singer Shaggy.

== Release history ==
Release dates and formats for Afrodhit
Region	Date	Format	Label	Ref.
Various	3 August 2023	Digital download; streaming	Warner	
