= Sarah Oliveira =

Brazilian radio host and television presenter

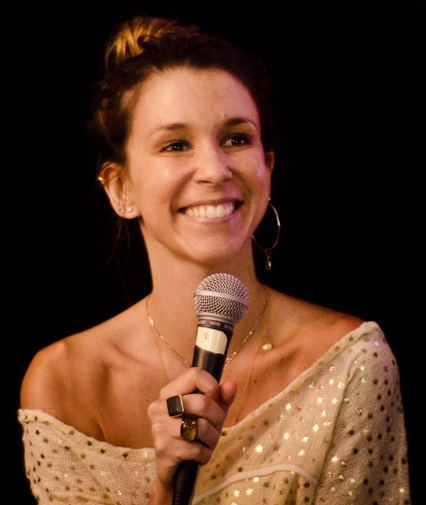
- Sarah in 2012.
- Born: Sarah Oliveira; January 29, 1979 (age 47); São Paulo, São Paulo, Brazil
- Education: Fundação Armando Alvares Penteado
- Occupations: Television host; journalist; television producer; documentary filmmaker; radio host; podcaster
- Years active: 1998–present
- Employers: MTV Brasil; TV Globo; GNT; Eldorado FM; Grupo Globo
- Known for: Hosting Disk MTV, Top 20 Brasil, Luau MTV (TV show), Jornal da MTV, Calada Noite, and Atenção para o Refrão
- Notable work: Na Trilha da Canção; Calada Noite; Minha Canção; Nós (podcast); Atenção para o Refrão
- Television: Disk MTV; Top 20 Brasil; Luau MTV (TV show); Jornal da MTV; Sobe o Som; VJs em Ação; Vídeo Show; Calada Noite; Atenção para o Refrão
- Awards: APCA Award nomination for Best Host (2016)

Sarah Oliveira (January 29, 1979) is a Brazilian television host. She has worked at MTV Brasil, GNT, and Eldorado FM.

== Biography ==
=== First years and education ===
Born in Perdizes in the city of São Paulo, Sarah grew up in Jardins, an upscale neighborhood in the state capital. Sarah was a classical ballerina for many years; she even became a member of the Royal Academy of Dance in London, where she lived for a while. As a ballerina, she even went on tour in Dallas, in the United States. She began dancing at the age of three and stopped at twenty-two to devote herself to ballet.

She enrolled in the Radio and TV program at the Fundação Armando Alvares Penteado (FAAP) at age 17. While a student, she was an intern at 89 FM A Rádio Rock, a rock radio station in São Paulo. She graduated from FAAP in 2001.

=== Career ===
After two years working at 89, she was invited by MTV Brasil's programming director, Cris Lobo, to join the network's journalism department. In 2000, the then-reporter for Contato MTV auditioned to appear on camera on that same show. Her performance caught the attention of the network's artistic directors, and she was ultimately chosen to be the network's new VJ, replacing Sabrina Parlatore on the shows Disk MTV and Top 20 Brasil. She later made her debut on Luau MTV a music show aired during the network's summer season and filmed on the beaches along the São Paulo coast, where she hosted recordings featuring artists such as O Rappa, Marcelo D2, Nando Reis, Pitty, Cássia Eller, and Engenheiros do Hawaii. In 2005, she left Disk MTV and Top 20 Brasil to host Jornal da MTV. At the station, he also hosted the shows Sobe o Som and VJs em Ação. After five years at MTV, he left MTV to join the Rio de Janeiro-based network TV Globo, where she became a reporter for Vídeo Show. While still with the network, she hosted the 2009 and 2010 Festival de Verão Salvador and provided live coverage of the 2008 and 2009 carnivals. She remained a reporter for Vídeo Show until 2009.

She conceived and produced the documentary Na Trilha da Canção, which explored the emotional connection between artists and bands in Brazilian music. The documentary premiered at São Paulo Museum of Image and Sound (MIS) and aired on the GNT channel in 2013. While still at GNT, she created the show Calada Noite, which explored the world of night owls and ran for two seasons on the network between 2015 and 2016.She was nominated for the APCA Award for Best Host in 2016. Among those she interviewed were personalities such as comedian Jô Soares, the acrtess Patrícia Pillar and actor Wagner Moura.

In September 2017, a new project she created for Eldorado FM, part of the Grupo Estado, titled Minha Canção, premiered. In 2021, the original Spotify podcast Nós premiered, co-hosted by Roberta Martinelli. In 2025, she curated the Brazilian edition of Tiny Desk, which was streamed on YouTube. In 2026, the show Atenção para o Refrão premiered on Bis, from Grupo Globo, where he spoke with musicians about the importance of the chorus in songs.

== Filmography ==
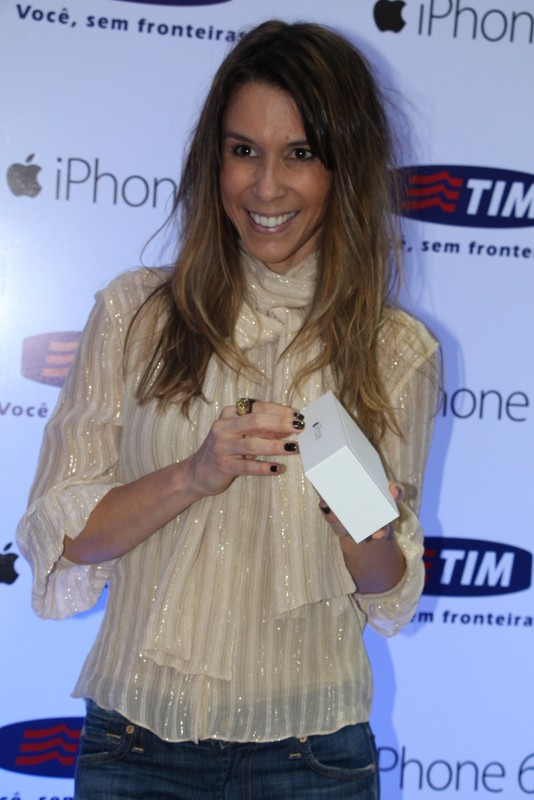
Sarah in 2017.

=== Television ===
Year	Production	Position	Station	Ref.
2000	Contato MTV	Reporter	MTV Brasil	
2000–2005	Disk MTV	Host	MTV Brasil	
2000–2005	Top 20 Brasil	Host	MTV Brasil	
2003	Megaliga MTV de VJs Paladinos	Dubbing	MTV Brasil	
2005	Jornal MTV	Host	MTV Brasil	
2006–2009	Vídeo Show	Reporter	TV Globo	
2009	Viver a Vida	Special guest	TV Globo	
2010	Viva Voz	Host	GNT	
2013	Na Trilha da Canção	Host	GNT	
2015–2016	Calada Noite	Host	GNT	
2018	Popstar	Sworn	TV Globo	
2022	Happy Hour com Mariana Ximenes	Guest	GNT	
2026	Atenção para o Refrão	Host	Bis	

=== Radio ===
Year	Production	Position	Station	Ref.
2017–2026	Minha Canção	Host	Eldorado FM	

=== Movies ===
Year	Production	Character	Note(s)	Ref.
2016	Amores Urbanos		Special guest	
2021	Chorão: Marginal Alado	Herself	Stock footage	
2025	Latin Blood: The Ballad of Ney Matogrosso	Fátima		

== Personal life ==
Sarah was married to business administrator Thiago Lopes from 2005 to 2022. The party was held at the São Paulo Jockey Club. Together, they had two children: Chloé, born on January 4, 2013, and Martin, born on December 20, 2015. She lives in the Jardim Paulista neighborhood in São Paulo. In the 2022 presidential election, she announced her support for Luiz Inácio Lula da Silva (PT). She identifies as a feminist. She is a vegetarian.

== Prizes ==
Year	Prize	Category	Work	Venue	Result	Ref.
2015	APCA Television Award	Best Host	Calada Noite	Union of Professional Journalists of the State of São Paulo, São Paulo, São Paulo, Brazil	Nominated	
2018	WME Awards	Radio Presenter	Minha Canção	Cine Joia, São Paulo, São Paulo, Brazil	Nominated	
2020	WME Awards	Radio Presenter	Minha Canção	Ibirapuera Auditorium, São Paulo, São Paulo, Brazil	Won	
