= MC Carol =

Brazilian singer and composer (born 1993)

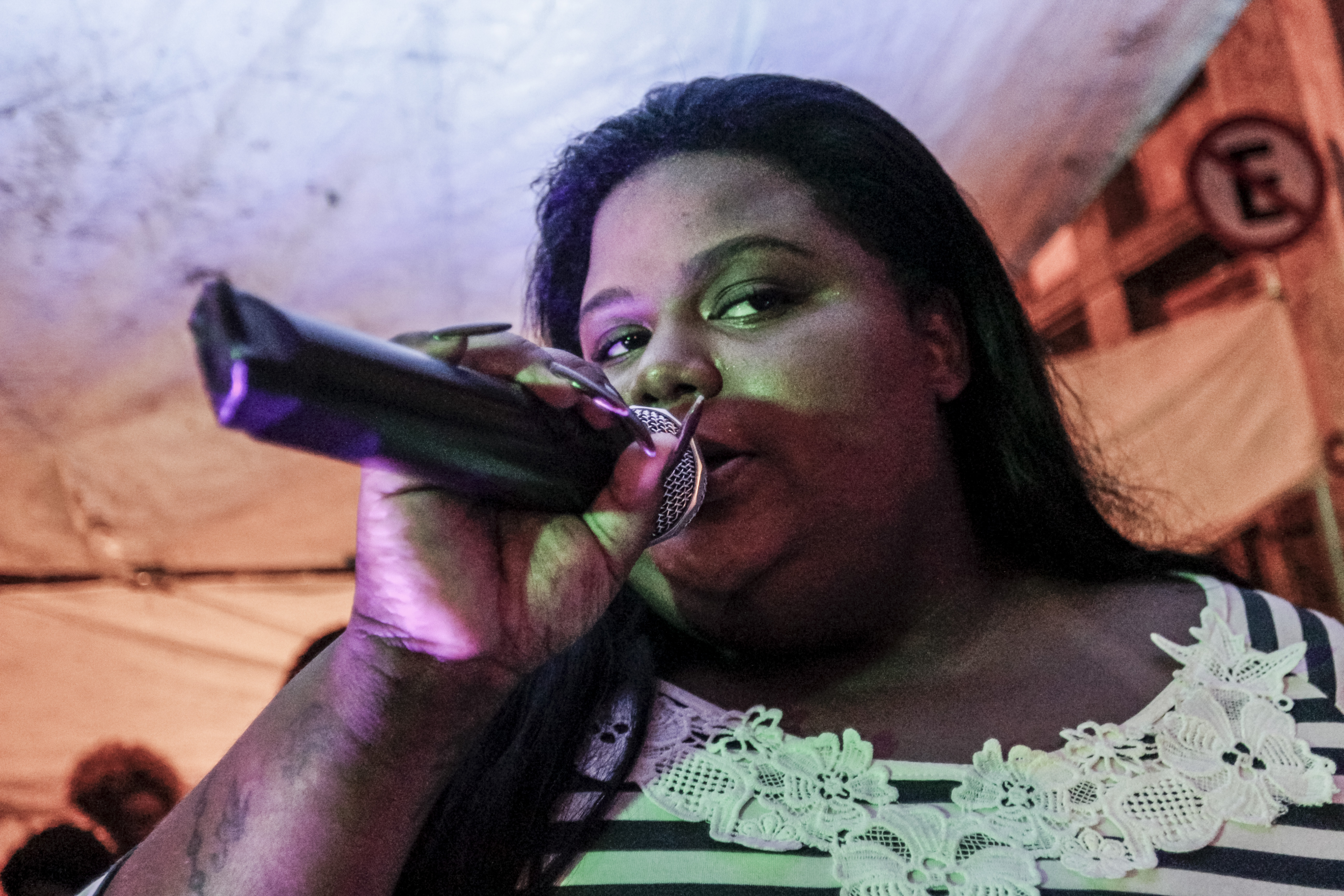
MC Carol

Carolina de Oliveira Lourenço (born 6 October 1993 in Niterói, Rio de Janeiro, Brazil), known professionally as MC Carol, is a Brazilian singer and composer. She is known for her social themes regarding feminism and, at the same time, double entendre songs related to explicit sex.

== Biography ==
Carolina de Oliveira Lourenço was born in the city of Niterói, in the Brazilian state of Rio de Janeiro, having lived on the Morro do Preventório.

== Musical career ==
As a solo artist, she started to gain notoriety after the release of a few singles and internet releases. Her first hit was with the song "Bateu uma Onda Forte" ("It Kicked Hard"). Afterwards, the singer and composer also gained notoriety with "Jorginho Me Empresta a 12" ("Jorginho Give Me the Shotgun"), "Liga pro Samu" ("Call the 911") and "Não Foi Cabral" ("It Wasn't Cabral" [who discovered Brazil]), with lyrics that raise a discussion about the history of Brazil taught in the education system.

Subsequently, MC Carol announced the release of her first studio album, Bandida ("Bandit"). As a preview, the artist released two singles: the first one was the song "Delação Premiada" ("Plea Bargaining"), produced by Leo Justi and the second one was "100% Feminista" ("100% Feminist"), with the singer Karol Conka. The album was released on the digital platforms on October 28, 2016.

== Political career ==
She ran unsuccessfully in the 2018 Brazilian elections for Rio de Janeiro state representative on the Brazilian Communist Party ticket. She had discussed running with Rio de Janeiro city councilor Marielle Franco prior to the latter's assassination and announced her candidacy shortly after Franco was assassinated.

== Discography ==
- 2016: Bandida

== Filmography ==
Year	Title	Role	Notes
2019	No Coração do Mundo	Brenda	
2020–2023	Wild & Free	Panelist	
2022	Barba, Cabelo & Bigode		
2022	Rule 34	Nill	
