= Music Box Brazil =

Television station in Brazil

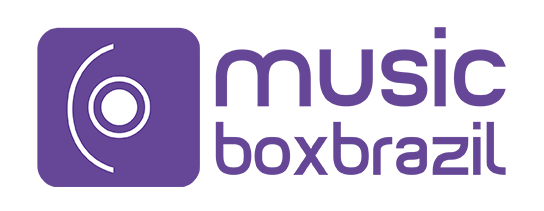
- Country: Brazil
- Headquarters: Rio Grande do Sul

Programming
- Language(s): Portuguese
- Picture format: 1080i (16:9 HDTV) (HD feed downgraded to letterboxed 480i for SDTV sets)

Ownership
- Owner: Box Brazil
- Sister channels: Prime Box Brazil, Fashion TV, Travel Box Brazil

History
- Launched: 2012

Music Box Brazil is an entertainment channel owned by Box Brazil cable and satellite television channel operator. Is the first channel dedicated exclusively to Brazilian music and is one of the main music channels in Brazil, among others like Multishow, MTV and Bis.

The channel went on air on January 1, 2012, after regulation by the Agência Nacional do Cinema (Ancine), which granted some channels the title of Brazilian channels with qualified space programmed by an independent Brazilian programmer, among which stand out the Prime Box Brazil, Travel Box Brazil and FashionTV channels, belonging to the same company. Music Box Brazil is available through Claro TV, Vivo TV, OI TV and via streaming through Box Brazil Play.

== Programming ==
- Babilônia
- Music Drops with MV Bill
- Estúdio Cabeça
- Fique em Casa com o Music
- História Secreta do Pop Brasileiro
- Jukebox
- Contando Músicas, Cantando Histórias
