= Xênia França =

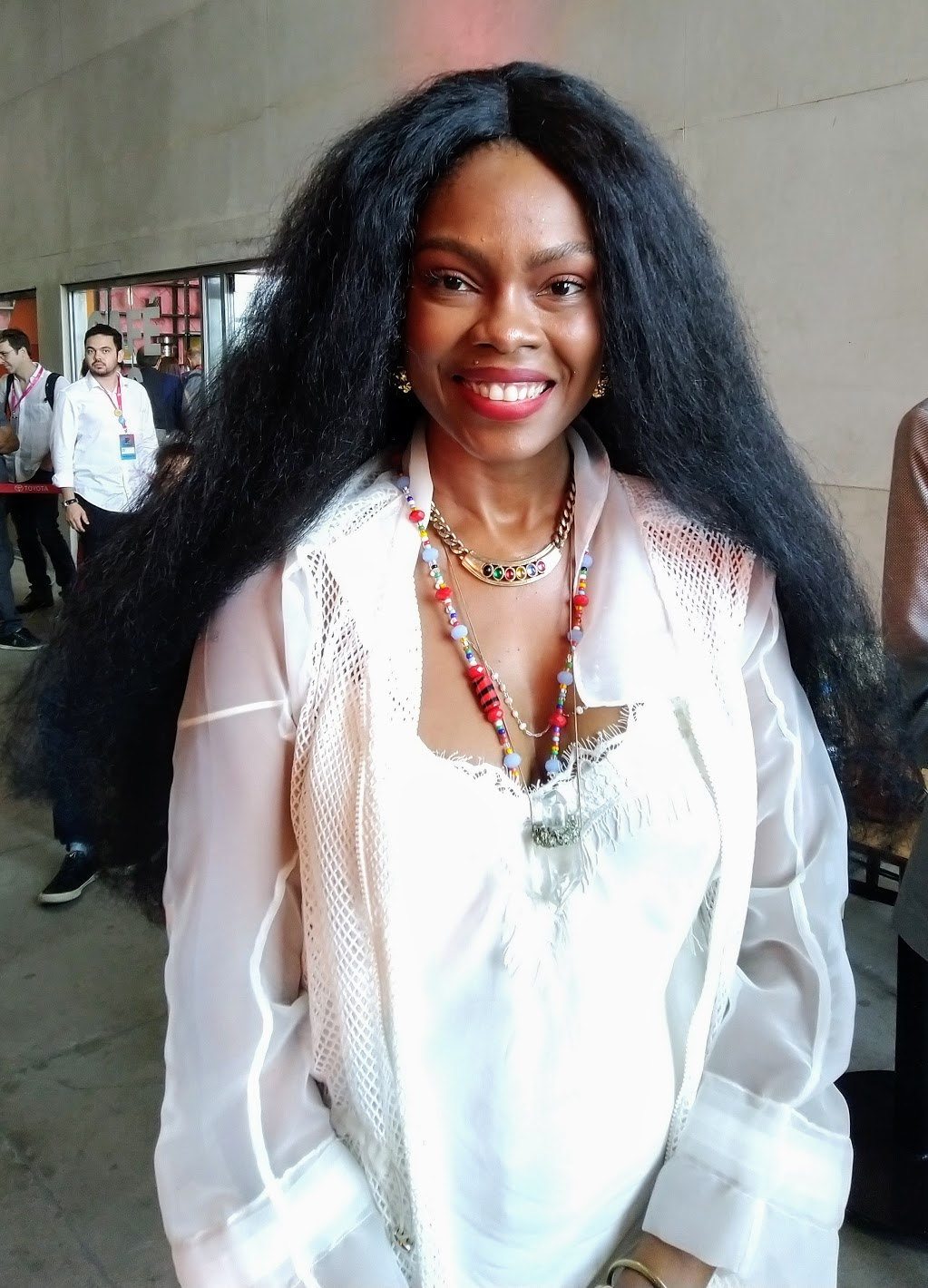
- Xênia França during the Rio2C event in 2019.

Background information
- Born: Xênia Érica Estrela França; 27 February 1986 (age 39); Candeias, Bahia, Brazil
- Origin: São Paulo, Brazil
- Genres: Pop, R&B, Soul, Jazz
- Occupations: Singer-songwriter, model
- Years active: 2010–present

Xênia Érica Estrela França (born 27 February 1986), known professionally as Xênia França, is a Brazilian singer-songwriter from Candeias.

== Biography and career ==
França was born in Recôncavo Baiano, spent her teenage years in Camaçari. She would later move to São Paulo in 2004. While there, she would work as a model. In 2008, where she started singing in bars alongside her modelling. While working, she met Emicida, a Brazilian rap artist, who invited her to contribute to the production of his EP Sua Mina Ouve Meu Rep Tamém and his album Emicídio, (both released in 2010). The following year, she joined the band Aláfia, alongside artists Pipo Pegoraro and Lucas Cirillo.

In 2017, França released her first solo album, entitled Xenia. Her album would later be nominated for the 2018 Latin Grammy Awards in the category Best Contemporary Pop Album, alongside her track Pra Que Me Chamas? which would be nominated for Best Portuguese-Language Song.

In 2019, Xênia França became the first Brazilian artist to perform on the world-renowned COLORS YouTube channel.

In 2022, França released her first self-published album Em Nome Da Estrela, again collaborating with former members of Aláfia and Lourenco Rebetez, for which she won the Latin Grammy Award for Best Portuguese Language Contemporary Pop Album in 2023.

== Discography ==
=== Studio albums ===
Title	Details
Xenia	Released: 29 September 2017; Label: Natura Musical; Formats: CD, LP, Digital download, streaming
Em Nome Da Estrela	Released: 3 June 2022; Label: Self-released; Formats: Streaming and digital download

=== With Aláfia ===
- 2017 – SP Não É Sopa (Agogô)
- 2015 – Corpura (YB Music/Natura Musical)
- 2013 – Aláfia (YB Music)
