= Helena Meirelles =

Brazilian musician

Helena Meirelles (August 13, 1924 – September 28, 2005) was a Brazilian guitar player, singer, and composer recognized around the world for her talent as a player of the viola caipira. She is one of the most important composers of the folk musical style of the region of Mato Grosso do Sul. Considered to be the Brazilian version of Robert Johnson, she was elected, in 1994 by Guitar Player magazine as one of the top 100 guitar players in the world.

== Biography ==
Born in Bataguassu, at the time the district of Nova Andradina, Helena Pereira Meirelles grew up surrounded by ranch hands, cattle-driving parties, and viola caipira players. She was fascinated by violas caipiras, but her family would not allow her to learn how to play them. She taught herself in secret, and she faced strong prejudice because it was not considered appropriate for women to play the viola caipira. Little by little she became known among the cowboys of the region. At 17 years old her parents arranged a marriage for her, but she abandoned her husband shortly after to join a Paraguayan who played violin and guitar. They also separated, and she resolved to play viola caipira at bars and parties. In order to do so, she left her children from the two marriages with adoptive parents. She married a third time later on, a marriage which lasted 35 years. After disappearing for more than 30 years, she was found very ill by a sister, who took her to São Paulo, where she was "discovered by the media" through a complementary reference in the North American magazine Guitar Player. She performed in a theater for the first time at 67 years old, and recorded albums afterwards. She was selected by Guitar Player in 1993 as one of the top 100 for her playing of 6, 8, 10, and 12 string viola caipira. Her music is recognized by those from Mato Grosso do Sul as an expression of roots and culture of the region.

=== Death ===
She died at 81 years old as a result of a cardiorespiratory arrest from chronic pneumonia.

== Awards and honors ==
- In 1993, she was elected by the American magazine Guitar Player (with a vote from Eric Clapton) as one of the 100 best instrumentalists in the world, for her playing of 6, 8, 10, and 12 string violas.
- In 2012, she was included in a list of 30 greatest Brazilian icons of guitar (Category: Brazilian Roots) in the magazine Rolling Stone Brasil.

== Albums ==
- 1994 – Helena Meirelles
- 1996 – Flor de guavira
- 1997 – Raiz pantaneira
- 2002 – Ao vivo (also known as De volta ao Pantanal)
- 2004 – Os bambas da viola (compilation with a theme by Helena Meirelles)

== Films ==
- Helena Meirelles – A Dama da Viola (2004), directed by Francisco de Paula;
- Dona Helena (2006) – directed by Dainara Toffoli.

== See also ==
- List of Brazilians
