= Lia de Itamaracá =

Singer from Brazil

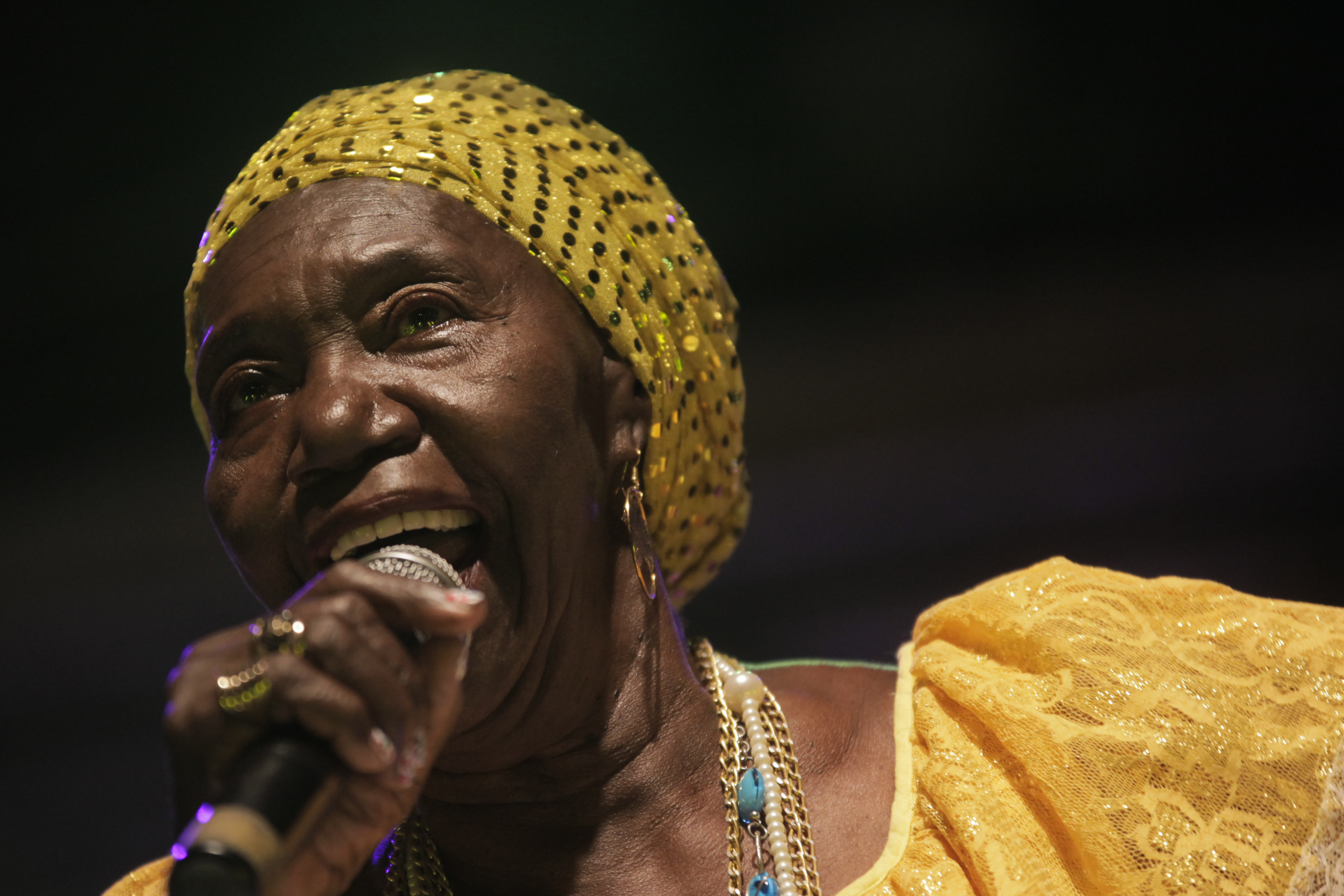

Background information
- Born: 12 January 1944 (age 82); Ilha de Itamaracá, Brazil
- Genres: Ciranda
- Instrument: Vocals

Lia de Itamaracá born Maria Madalena Correia do Nascimento (born 1944) is a Brazilian singer and songwriter. She appeared singing in the 60s but she did not emerge internationally until the 1990s. She sings and dances in the ciranda style in her 80th year.

== Life ==
Lia de Itamaraca (Brazil) at World Music Festival Horizonte 2023 (Germany)

Maria Madalena Correia do Nascimento was born on 12 January 1944. Itamaracá comes from the island Ilha de Itamaracá which is off the coast of the Northeast Brazilian state of Pernambuco. She sings and dances ciranda, which comes from Pernambuco and it has been described as "a tribalistic ritual" combining dance and singing and "Christian and pagan values".

She was singing in the 1960 when Teca Calazans noted that she had been given a tune by Lia from Itamaraca and from that she became "Lia de Itamaraca".

In 1977 she recorded her first album although her only payment was to get copies of it. It was called "A Rainha da Ciranda". It was not until the 1990s that Beto Hees took her to the 1998 festival, Abril Pro Rock festival where her talent was recognised. She recorded her first CD four years later and it was titled, Eu Sou Lia, and this resulted in bookings and workshops. Until 2008 she was the lunch lady at her local school.

In March 2023 there was a touring exhibition titled, " Occupation Lia de Itamaracá". It was based on her costumes and showing photos and documents from her history. The exhibition completed in the state capital of Recife. The exhibition notes that it will be her 80th birthday in January.

In June 2023 she was chosen for an award for her cultural contribution together with cultural journalist Juarez Fonseca, fellow singer Chico Science and artist Renato Matos. The award was made in Brasília in June 2023 at the 7th "Music Professionals Award".
