= Tássia Reis =

Brazilian rapper (born 1989)

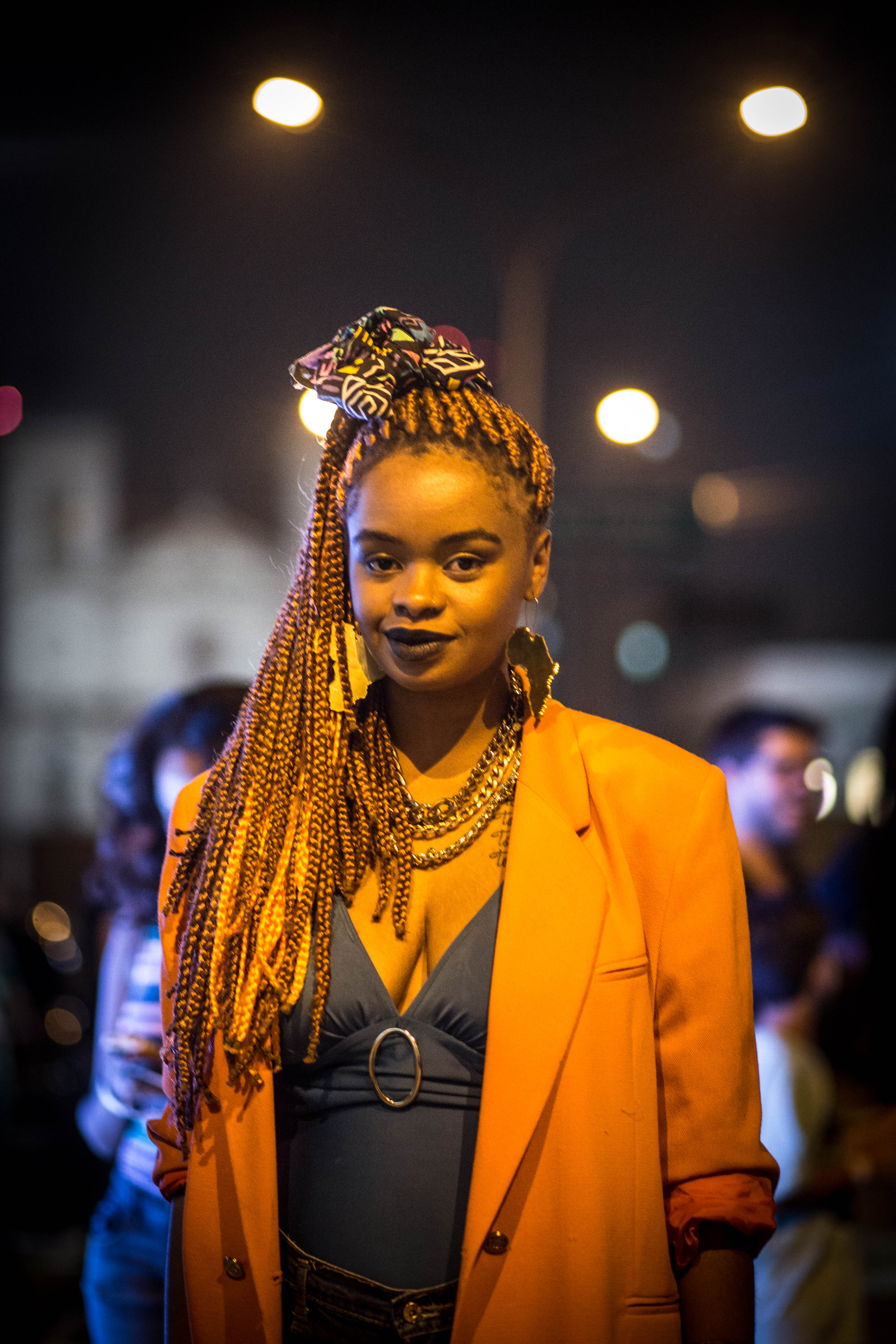

Background information
- Also known as: Tássia Reis
- Born: Tássia dos Reis Santos; August 16, 1989 (age 37); Jacareí
- Genre: Rap
- Occupations: Songwriter, rapper, and singer

Tássia Reis, artistic name of Tássia dos Reis Santos (Jacareí, August 16, 1989), is a Brazilian rapper, singer and songwriter.

== Career ==
One of the first female rappers of new Brazilian music, Reis started her career with the EP Tássia Reis in 2014. Then came the debut album Outra Esfera in 2016. After the two materials were released came the national hits "No Seu Radinho" and "Se Avexe Não."

In 2019, she released her second album, Próspera. The album was critically acclaimed and considered one of the best albums of the year by APCA.

Her album Topo da Minha Cabeça was included in the list of 50 best albums of 2024 by the São Paulo Art Critics Association.

== Discography ==
=== Albums ===
- Próspera
- Tássia Reis
- Outra Esfera
- Topo da Minha Cabeça

=== Singles ===
- "No Seu Radinho"
- "Se Avexe Não"
