= Teatro Sérgio Cardoso =

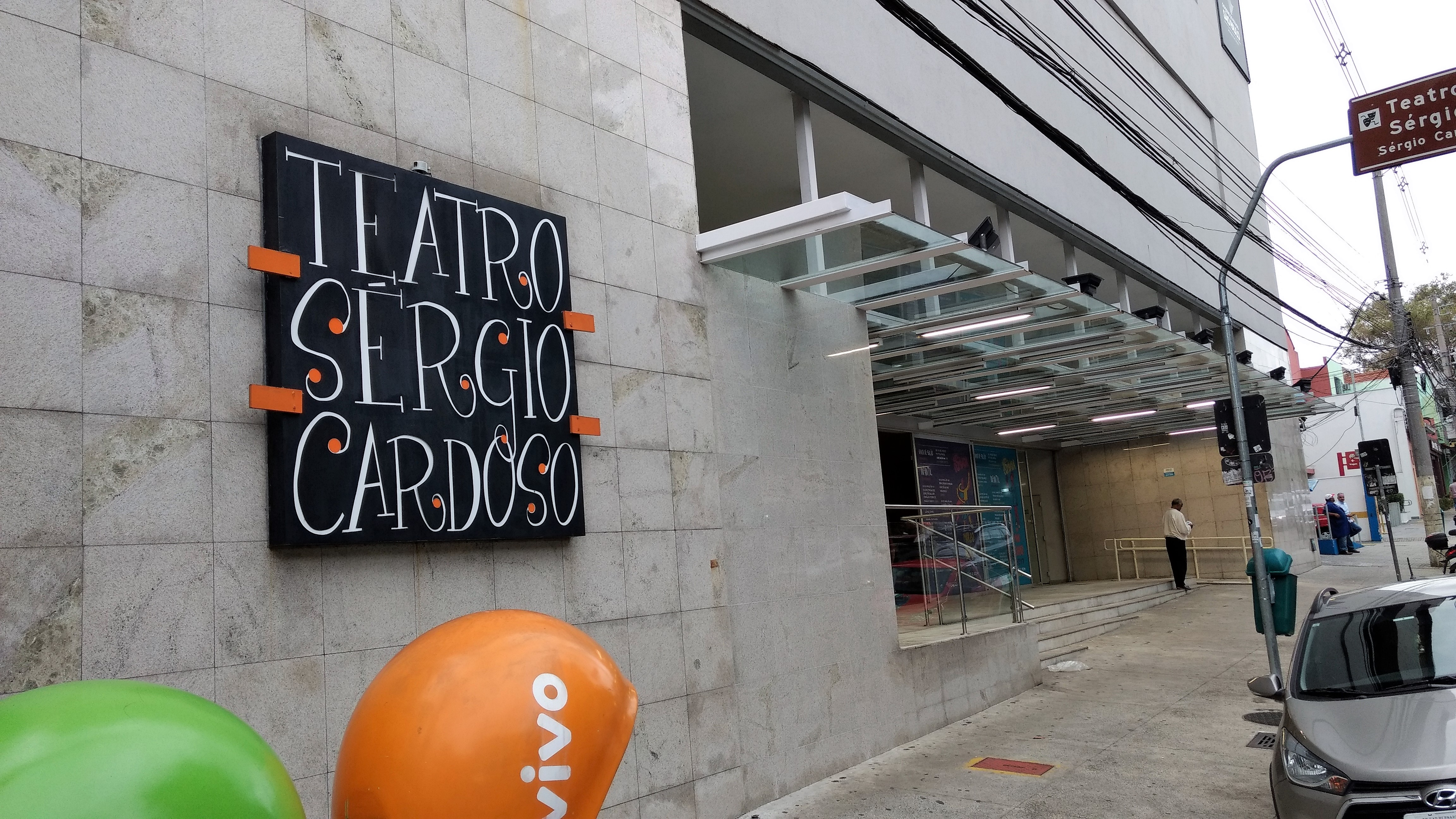
- Location: São Paulo, Brazil

Website
- Official website

Teatro Sérgio Cardoso is a theatre in São Paulo, Brazil. It has nearly 900 seats and was inaugurated in 1980.
