= Teatro Paramount =

Theater in São Paulo, Brazil

Renault Theater
- Teatro Renault
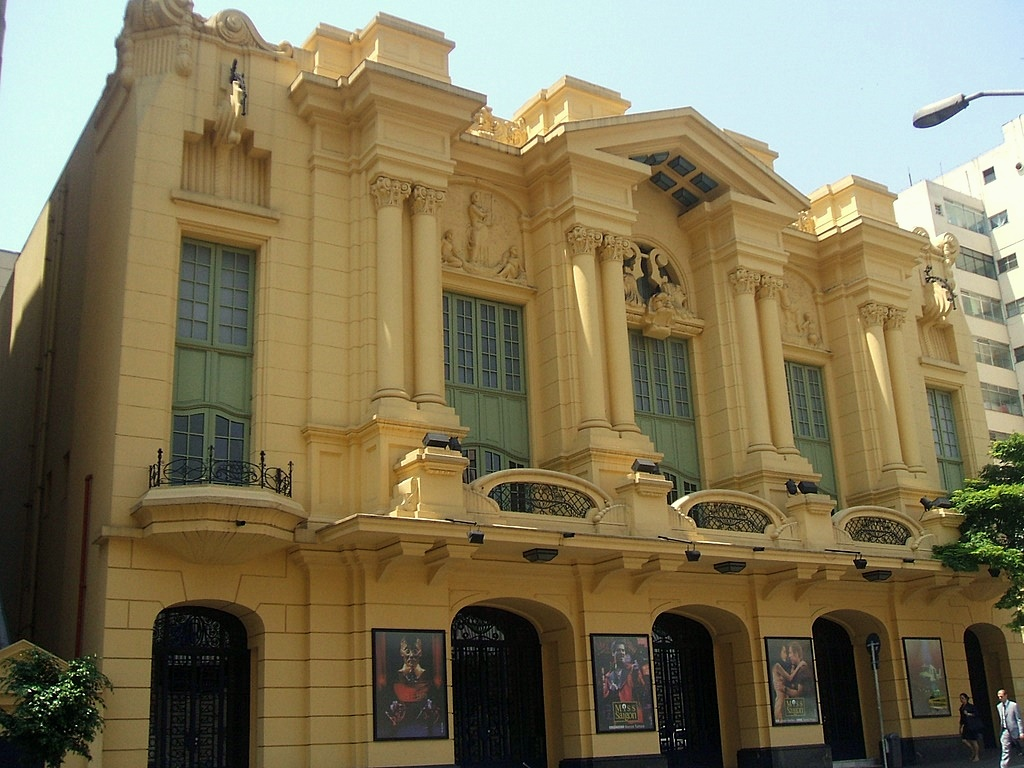
- Renault Theater promoting Miss Saigon.

- Location within São Paulo Location within Brazil
- Former names: Teatro Paramount (Paramount Theater); Teatro Abril (Abril Theater)

General information
- Type: Theater
- Architectural style: Eclectic; Art deco
- Location: São Paulo, São Paulo, Brazil
- Coordinates: 23°32′48″S 46°38′19″W
- Inaugurated: April 16th, 1929
- Destroyed: July 13, 1969 (partial fire)
- Owner: T4F - Time for Fun; Renalt

Technical details
- Floor count: 2
- Floor area: 5.532 m²

Design and construction
- Architects: Francisco Augusto da Silva Rocha; Francisco de Paula Ramos de Azevedo

Other information
- Seating capacity: 1 552

Teatro Renault (English: Renault Theater), also known as Teatro Paramount (Paramount Theater) and Teatro Abril (Abril Theater), is located on Brigadeiro Luís Antônio Avenue, in the Brazilian city of São Paulo. It opened in 1929, burned down in 1969 and reopened in 2001.

== History ==
The construction of the Paramount Theater began in 1927. Owned by Paramount Pictures, it was designed by engineer Arnaldo Maia Lello and architects Francisco Augusto da Silva Rocha and Francisco de Paula Ramos de Azevedo using a combination of art deco and eclectic styles. It accommodated 1,800 people, including the audience, balcony and boxes, and was the first sound cinema in Latin America.

Before construction, the site was occupied by the Palace Theatro, an old wooden house owned by Alberto Andrade and dedicated to showing plays, circus shows and films. In April 1929, the theater premiered in the presence of Melville Shauer, a representative of Paramount's foreign department. The movie The Patriot, with Swiss actor Emil Jennings in the lead role, was chosen for the opening night. There was also a performance by the symphony orchestra conducted by Leo Renard and a speech by Sebastião Sampaio, the Consul General of Brazil in New York, which became the first broadcast with sound in Latin America through the Movietone audio system.

The theater gained prominence as a concert hall during the 1930s and 1940s, and began hosting São Paulo's grand carnival balls in the 1950s. In the 1960s, it was sold to Record, which used the venue to broadcast the program O Fino da Bossa, presented by Elis Regina and Jair Rodrigues, and the III Festival de Música Popular Brasileira, held in 1967 with the participation of Edu Lobo, Caetano Veloso, Chico Buarque and Gilberto Gil.

In 1969, a fire partially destroyed the Paramount Theater. The venue was renovated and only the original foyer and facade were kept. In the new project, the space was divided into five cinemas, including three small projection rooms on the first floor and two small theaters on the upper floor. In the 1980s, the São Paulo City Hall listed the facade and foyer as cultural heritage. In 1996, it ceased operating due to competition from cinemas in shopping malls.

In 2001, the theater was completely restored through a partnership between CIE Brasil (now T4F – Time For Fun), which invested in the construction of Credicard Hall, and the Grupo Abril. Entitled Teatro Abril, it was inaugurated after ten months of work with a performance of Les Miserábles. The stage, audience and support facilities were redesigned and rebuilt. On top of the stage, which measures 225 square meters and is 10 meters high, there is a space of 15 meters to store the scenery canvases without having to roll them up. The pit covers 86 square meters and can fit 80 musicians. It accommodates 1,552 spectators, including 489 seats in the balcony, 104 in the boxes and 959 in the audience. An annex building was incorporated into the theater and houses the box office, a souvenir store and a café.

On November 1, 2012, it was named Teatro Renault after a naming rights contract signed between T4F - Time For Fun and Renault. The first performance was The Lion King, which premiered in March 2013.

== Review ==
On September 28, 2014, Folha de S. Paulo published the evaluation made by the newspaper's team after visiting the sixty largest theaters in the city of São Paulo. Renault Theater earned three stars and the following consensus: "Stage for the musical 'The Lion King' since March 2013, the art nouveau venue has no seating in its lobby and no signage for the drinking fountain. The bonbonnière is full and expensive. The space between the rows is small, and the visibility of the stage is good in the audience but poor in the mezzanine - with blind spots, even".

== Musicals ==
Musical	Premiere	Closing
Les Misérables	April 25, 2001	March 31, 2002
Beauty and the Beast	June 20, 2002	December 21, 2003
Chicago	April 28, 2004	December 19, 2004
The Phantom of the Opera	April 21, 2005	April 22, 2007
Miss Saigon	July 12, 2007	December 14, 2008
Beauty and the Beast (revival)	April 30, 2009	November 8, 2009
Cats	March 4, 2010	September 19, 2010
Mamma Mia!	November 11, 2010	December 18, 2011
The Addams Family	March 2, 2012	December 16, 2012
The Lion King	March 28, 2013	December 14, 2014
Sister Act	March 5, 2015	December 13, 2015
Wicked	March 4, 2016	December 18, 2016
Les Misérables (revival)	March 10, 2017	December 18, 2016
The Sound of Music**	March 28, 2018	May 27, 2018
The Phantom of the Opera (revival)	August 2, 2018	December 15, 2019
Charlie and the Chocolate Factory**	September 17, 2021	December 19, 2021
The Addams Family (revival)	March 10, 2022	August 28, 2022
Anastasia	November 10, 2022	May 7, 2023
The Lion King (revival)	July 20, 2023	May 19, 2024

(**) Musical not produced by T4F - Time 4 Fun.

== See also ==
- Tourism in the city of São Paulo
