= Ibirapuera Auditorium =

Coordinates: 23°35′09″S 46°39′23″W

- Auditório Ibirapuera
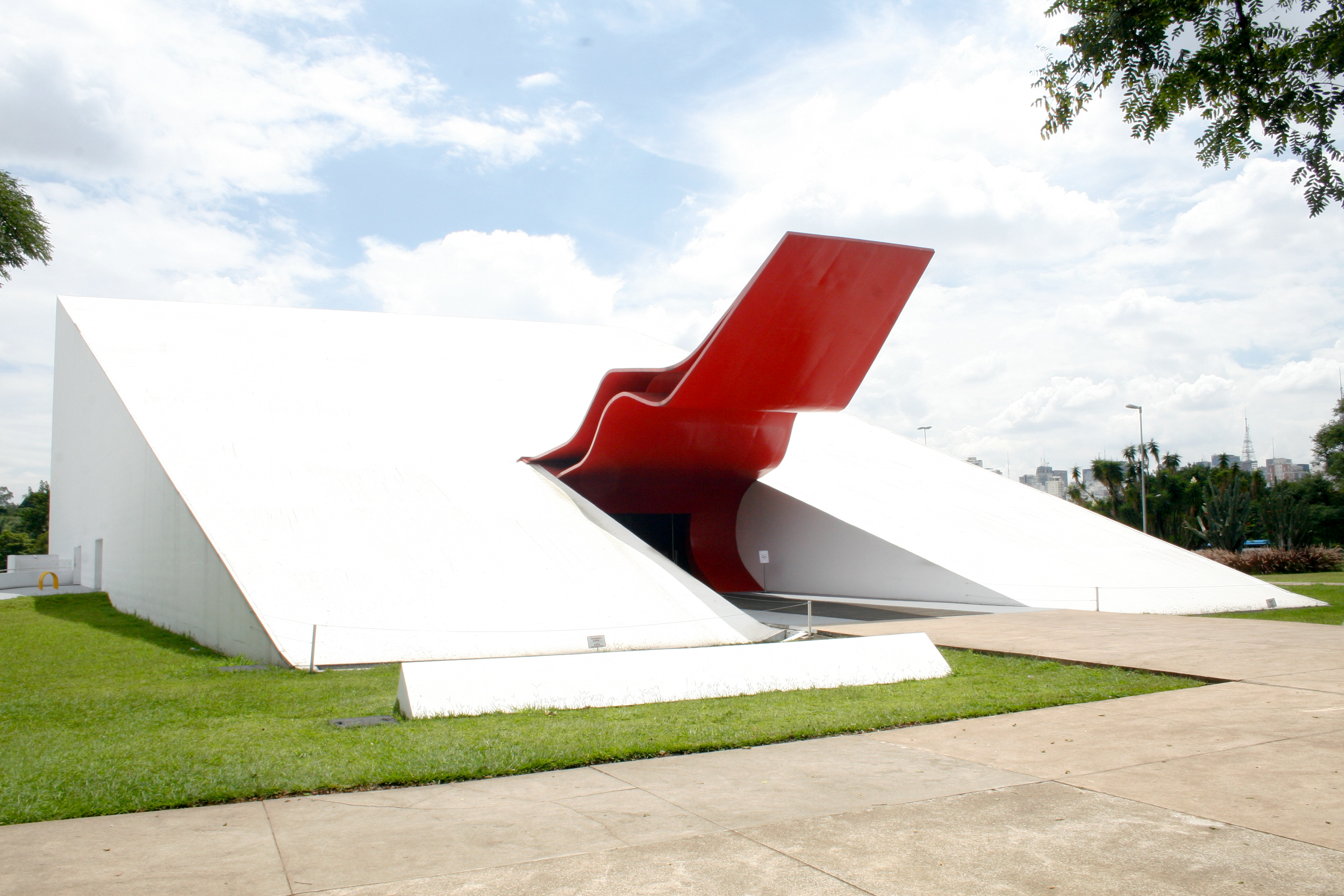
- Entrance to Ibirapuera auditorium in Ibirapuera park
- Interactive map of the Ibirapuera Auditorium area

General information
- Location: São Paulo, Brazil
- Construction started: 2002
- Completed: 2005

Technical details
- Floor area: 7,000 square feet (650 m^{2})

Design and construction
- Architects: Oscar Niemeyer with Hélio Pasta and Hélio Penteado (collaborators)

The Ibirapuera Auditorium (Portuguese: Auditório Ibirapuera) is a building conceived by Oscar Niemeyer for the presentation of musical spectacles, situated in Ibirapuera Park in São Paulo.

== History ==
The auditorium completes the group of buildings in Ibirapuera park, as designed originally by the architect in the 1950s. Compared to the original proposal it is lacking only the access square that would separate it from the Oca, which would serve as the main entrance to the park.

At the 2008 Latin Grammy Awards the Brazilian Field awards were presented at the Ibirapuera Auditorium. In December of the same year, the Ibirapuera Auditorium was the host of the final fashion show of America's Next Top Model, Cycle 12.

== Architectural concept ==
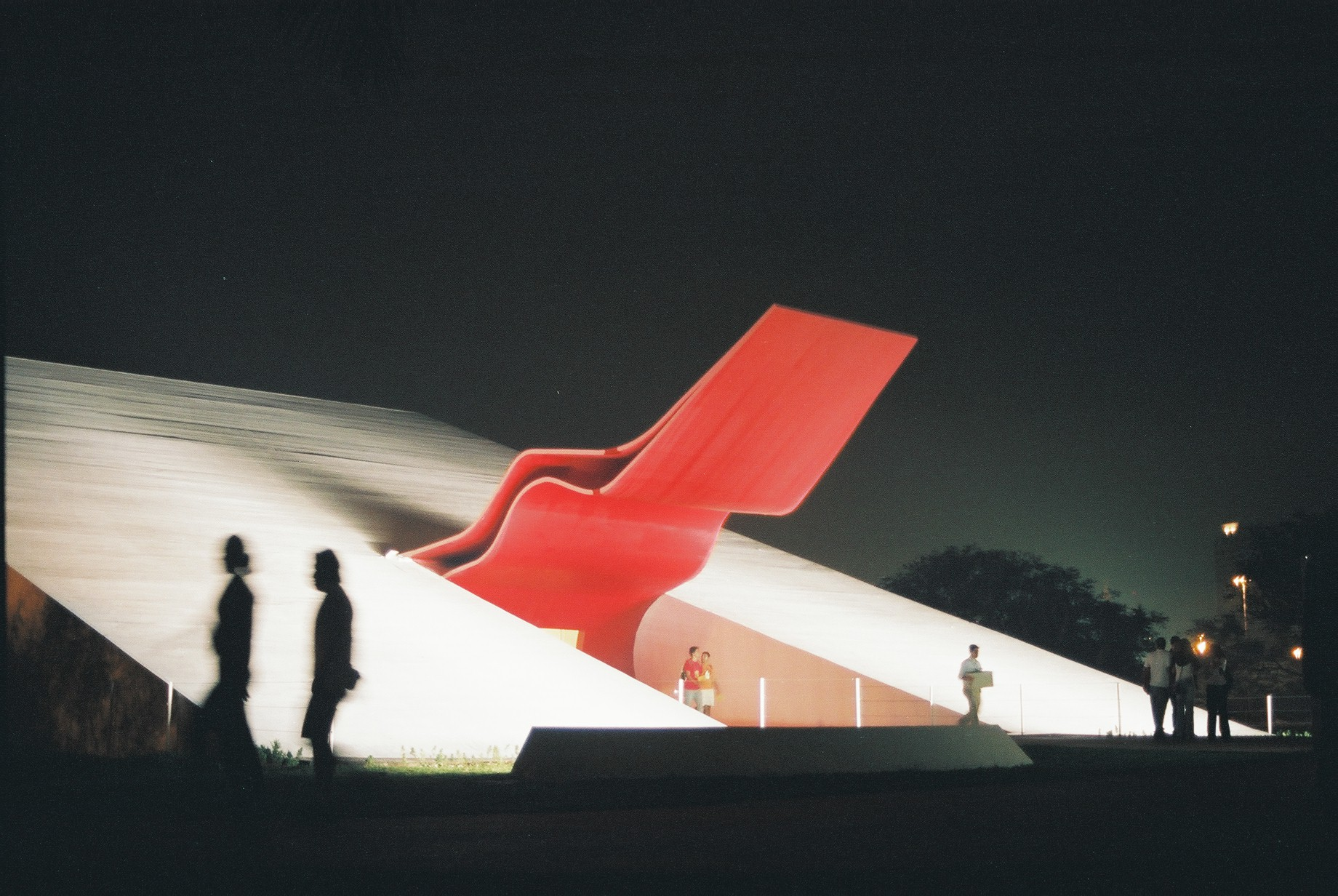
The front of the auditorium at night

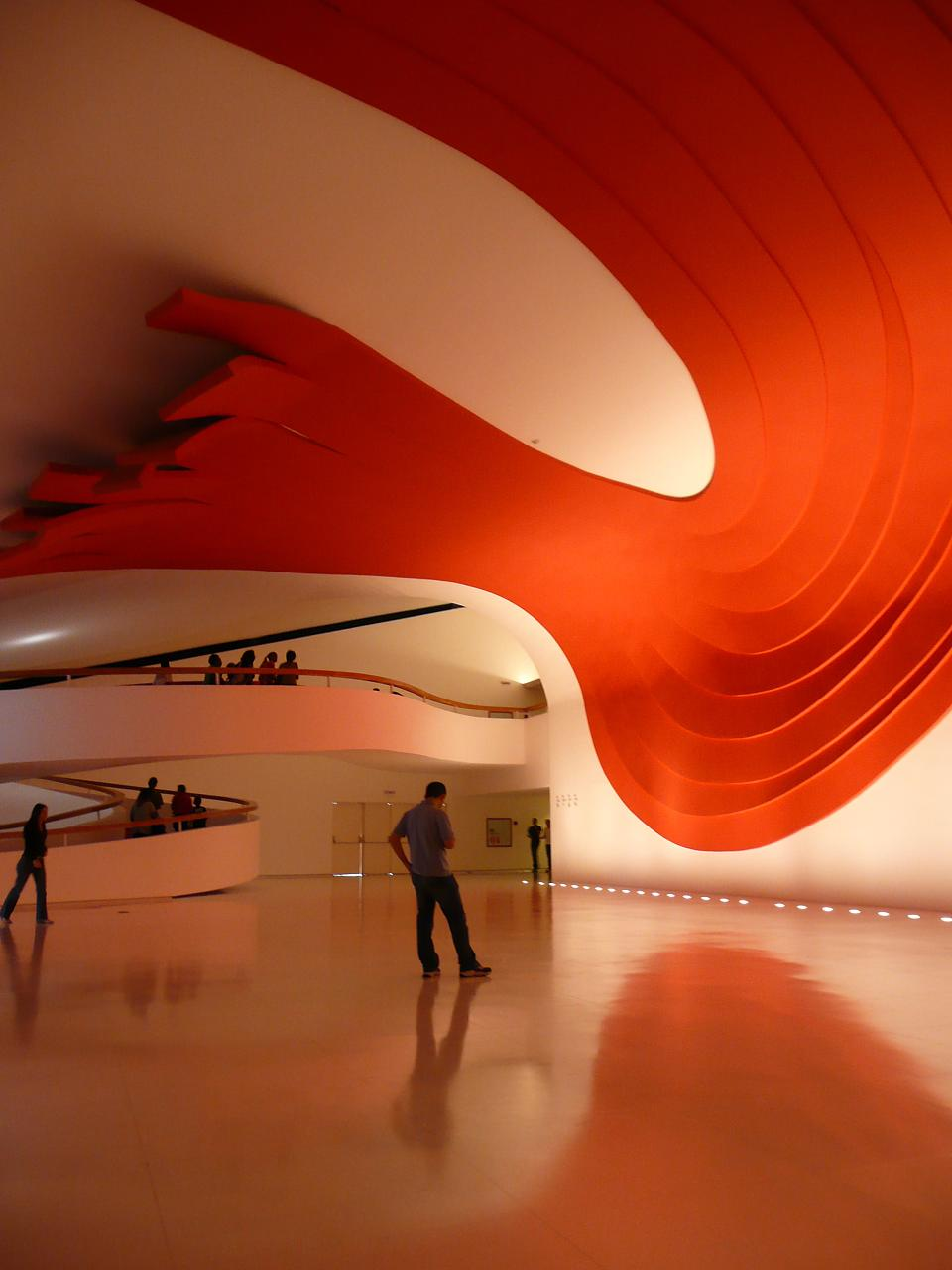
Interior of the auditorium.

The building possesses volumetric simplicity, composed of a single block that in plan has the form of a trapezoid and, in section, the form of a triangle. As well as the other buildings in the park such as the Oca dome, and a great part of the architect's work, the auditorium is composed of reinforced concrete painted white.

The unique form and spatial massing sets it apart from other auditoriums for concerts since the conception of the Paris Opera in the 19th century. It is composed of a separation of three parts, which makes a sequence of foyer, audience, stage from the exterior to the interior.

The group formed by the auditorium together with the Oca, which is a semi-sphere, composing two buildings of pure and white geometrical volumes, is considered the most important of the project from an architectural point of view. The articulation of the group would be made complete by a great civic square, marquee, and footbridge, that have not been realized.

A marquee, executed in red painted metal, covers the main access and gives identity to the building, characterizing it and differentiating it from other buildings. For this reason, the form and color of this element have transformed the branding of the auditorium and act as an architectural logo. It is called officially the Labareda - Portuguese for flame.

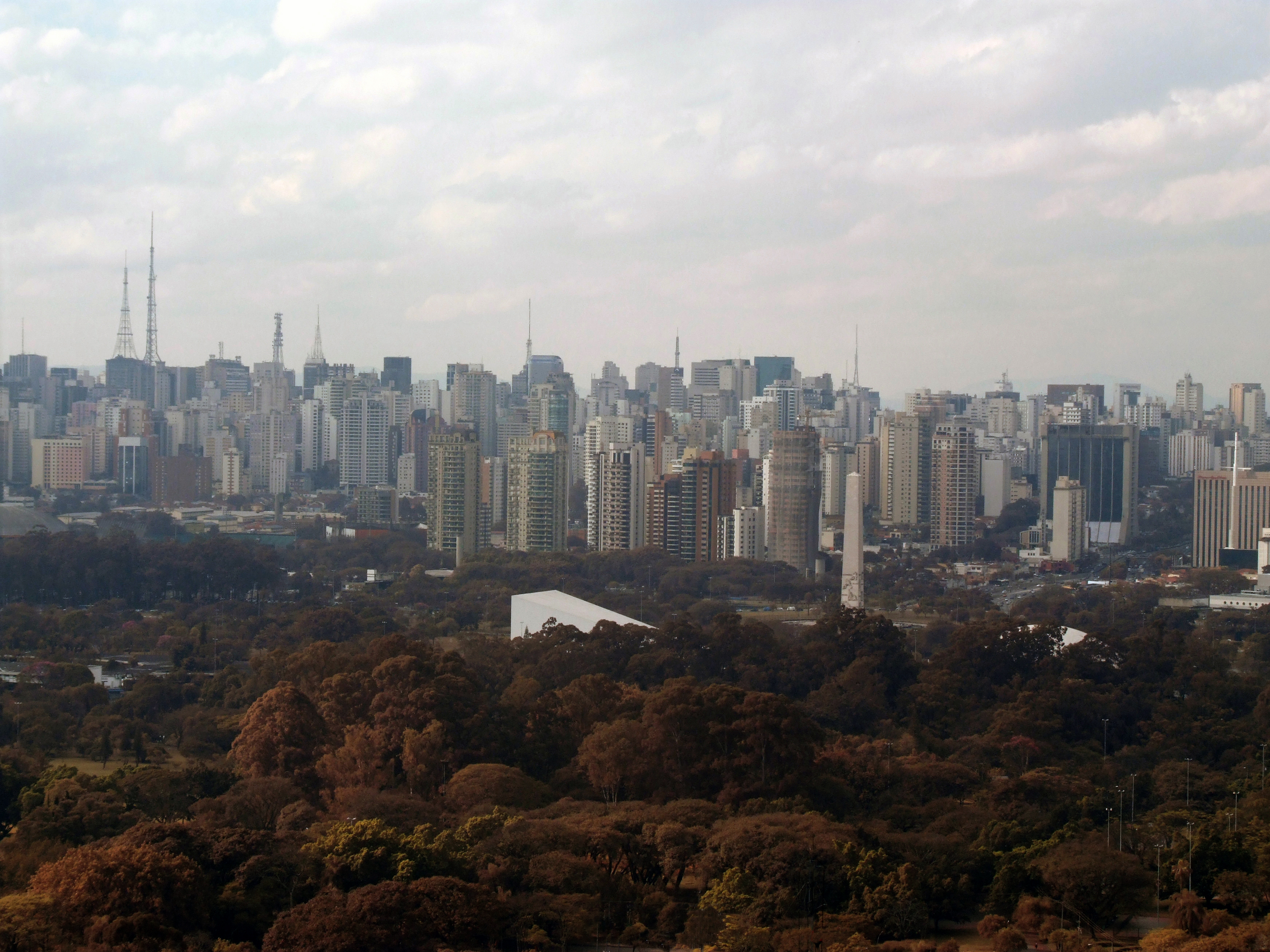
Auditorium, Paulista Avenue background

== Internal organization ==
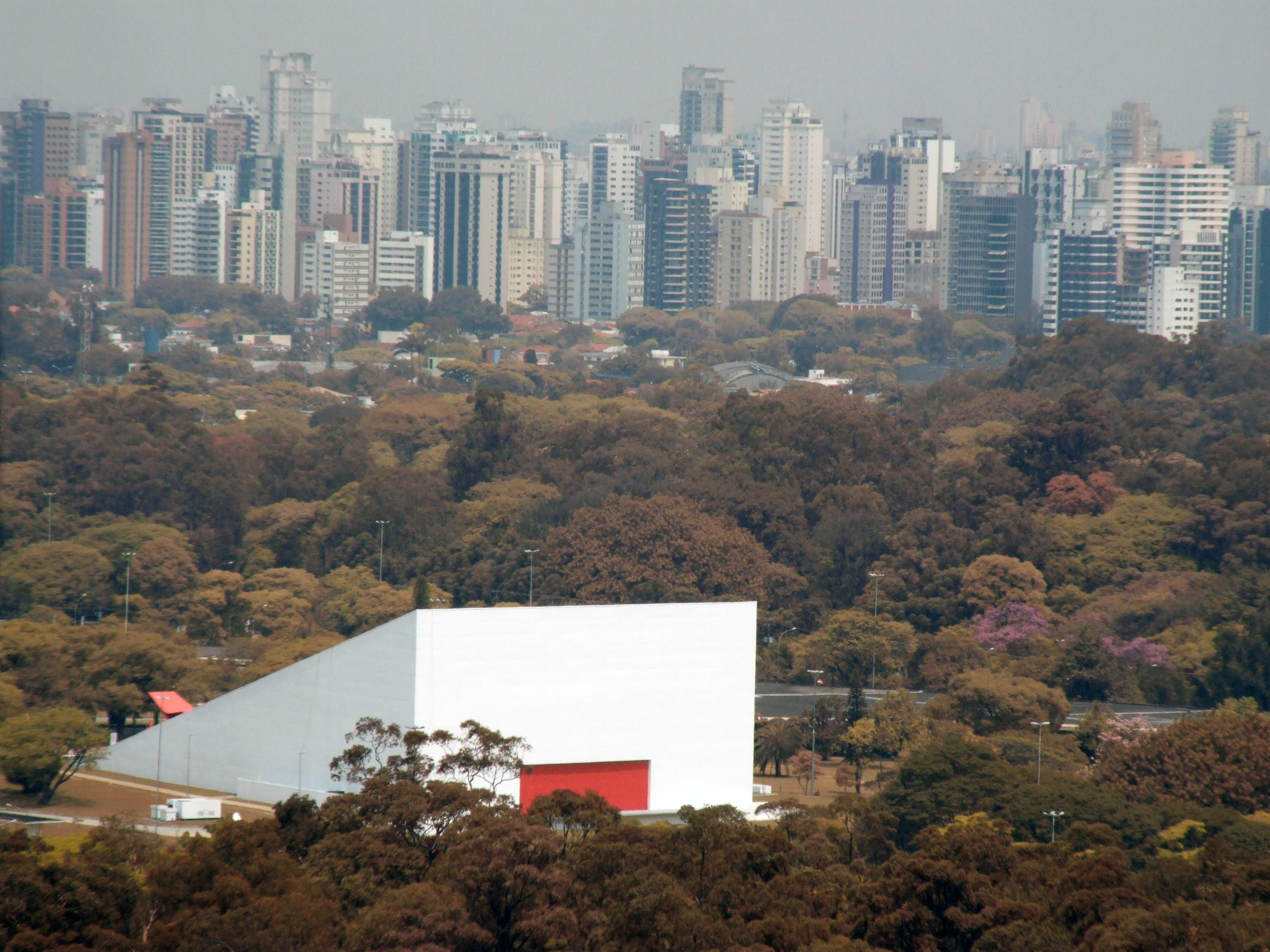
Auditorium, Moema background

On the first floor is a foyer leading to the stage and audience. On the lower floor is a bar, rooms for administration, the music school and dressing rooms. The auditorium has an 18-meter-wide back door that, when opened, permits access to what is presented on the stage to people situated outside, for open-air concerts. stage.

=== Works of art ===
- Tomie Ohtake and Luís Antônio Vallandro Keating

== See also ==
List of Oscar Niemeyer works

Preceded by Mandalay Bay Events Center	Host of the Latin Grammy Awards (Brazilian Field Awards); 2008	Succeeded by Mandalay Bay Events Center
