= Iza (singer) =

Brazilian singer (born 1990)

IZA
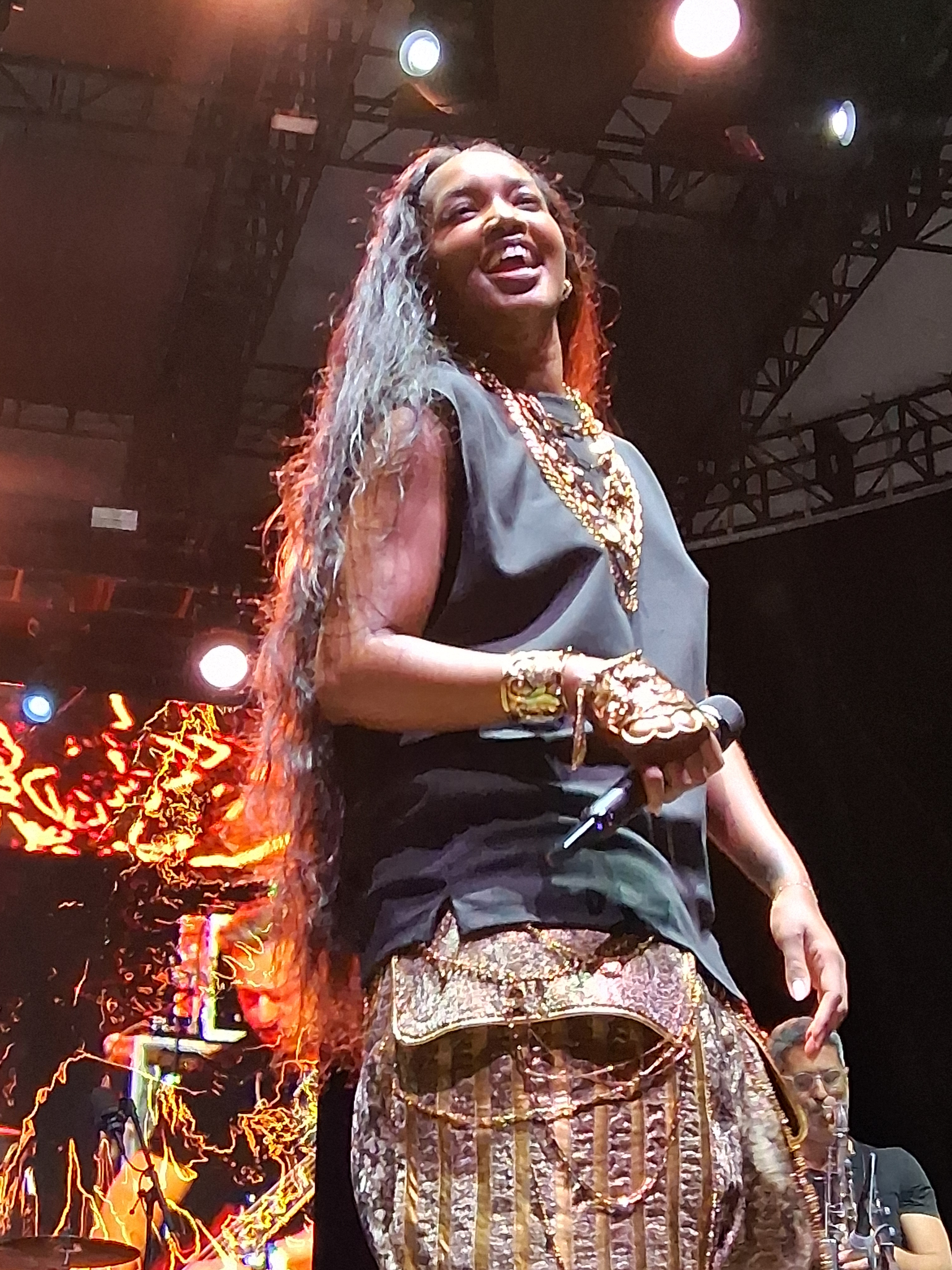
- Iza in 2025.
- Born: Isabela Cristina Correia de Lima Lima; 3 September 1990 (age 36); Rio de Janeiro, Brazil
- Other name: The Empress
- Occupations: Singer; songwriter; dancer
- Years active: 2016–present
- Height: 1.76 m (5 ft 9 in)
- Spouse: Sérgio Santos (m. 2018; div. 2022)
- Musical career
- Genres: R&B; pop; soul; Afrobeats; Trap; reggae
- Instruments: Vocals; piano
- Label: Warner Music Brasil

Isabela Cristina Correia de Lima Lima (born 3 September 1990), known professionally as IZA, is a Brazilian singer, songwriter and dancer, who rose to fame recording cover songs of artists such as Beyoncé, Rihanna, and Sam Smith on her self-titled YouTube channel. She has also featured her songs on Spotify and SoundCloud. In May 2016, she signed a contract with Warner Music Brasil. Her debut album, Dona de Mim, was released in 2018 and was nominated for a Latin Grammy Award for Best Portuguese Language Contemporary Pop Album.

== Early life ==
Iza was born in Rio de Janeiro, Brazil. At the age of six, her family moved to Natal, Rio Grande do Norte, where she began singing and performing at family parties and church events. After moving back to Rio de Janeiro at the age of eighteen, she got a degree in advertising from Pontifical Catholic University of Rio de Janeiro and then she started her YouTube channel shortly thereafter.

== Career ==
At the age of 19, she returned to Rio de Janeiro and continued with that activity here as well. In 2009, at the age of eighteen, she attended the advertising course at the Pontifical Catholic University of Rio de Janeiro (PUC-Rio), graduating in 2013 and then began working as a video editor. In 2015, in parallel, she created a channel on YouTube and began posting music cover videos.

At the end of 2017, she was the main attraction of Pré-Reveillon POPline. On 3 February 2018, she participated in the Planeta Atlântida festival.

Her album Dona de Mim was ranked as the 41st best Brazilian album of 2018 by the Brazilian edition of Rolling Stone magazine and among the 25 best Brazilian albums of the first half of 2018 by the São Paulo Association of Art Critics.

In May 2021, Iza was named one of Time Magazine's Next Generation Leaders.

On 2 September 2022, Iza released a three-song EP that makes up her upcoming album. Named Três, the project becomes a promotion for the singer's performance on the main stage of Rock in Rio 2022, who became the first black Brazilian singer to perform on the main stage.

Iza revealed that in February 2023 she scrapped an album that was fully done. With that, the artist produced a new album in about 5 months. The first single from the album "Fé nas Malucas" in collaboration with MC Carol was released on 27 July 2023

On July 30, the release date of the album AFRODHIT was announced, which was released on 3 August 2023, with 13 new tracks.

== Personal life ==
In 2016, Iza began dating Brazilian music producer Sérgio Santos. She married him in the Nossa Senhora da Glória do Outeiro Church, in Rio de Janeiro on 16 December 2018. Iza announced their divorce on 10 October 2022.

Iza identifies herself as a feminist. In 2022, Iza declared she is demisexual.

On 14 February 2023, she announced that she started dating Brazilian soccer player Yuri Lima. On April 10, 2024, Iza announced that she was pregnant with her first daughter. On July 10, Iza announced that the relationship had come to an end due to the football player's infidelity.

== Discography ==
=== Studio albums ===
List of studio albums
Title	Album details	Certifications
Dona de Mim	Released: 27 April 2018; Label: Warner; Formats: CD, LP, download, streaming	
Afrodhit	Released: 3 August 2023; Label: Warner; Formats: download, streaming	

=== Singles ===
Title	Year	Peak chart positions	Album
Title	Year	BRA	Album
"Te Pegar"	2017	—	Non-album singles
"Esse Brilho É Meu"	2017	—	Non-album singles
"Pesadão" (featuring Marcelo Falcão)	2017	41	Dona de Mim
"Ginga" (featuring Rincon Sapiência)	2018	62	Dona de Mim
"Dona de Mim"	2018	69	Dona de Mim
"Brisa"	2019	48	Non-album singles
"Meu Talismã"	2019	72	Non-album singles
"Evapora" (with Ciara and Major Lazer)	2019	75	Non-album singles
"Let Me Be the One"" (with Maejor)	2020	44	Non-album singles
"Bend The Knee" (with Bruno Martini and Timbaland)	2020	59	Original
"Gueto"	2021	30	Non-album singles
"Sem Filtro"	2021	59	Non-album singles
"Fé nas Maluca"	2023	—	Afrodhit
"—" denotes a single that did not chart or was not released in that territory.

=== Promotional singles ===
Title	Year	Album
"Quem Sabe Sou Eu"	2016	Non-album singles
"Vim Pra Ficar"	2017	Non-album singles

== Filmography ==
=== Television ===
Year	Title	Role	Note
2016	Nada Será Como Antes	Cameo	Episode: "October 4"
2017–19	TVZ	Guest TV host	Episode: "16 de outubro" Episode: "30 de maio" Episode: "18 de abril"
2018	Vai Que Cola	Teriza Sampaio	Episode: "A Prima de Terezinha"
2018	Popstar	Special judge	Episode: "September 30"
2018–2019	Música Boa Ao Vivo	TV host	
2019	SóTocaTop	TV host	
2019	Mulheres Fantásticas	Narrator	
2019–2023	The Voice Brasil	Judge/Coach	

=== Films ===
Year	Title	Role	Note
2019	The Lion King	Nala (voice)	Brazilian Portuguese Dub
2024	Mufasa: The Lion King	Nala (voice)	Brazilian Portuguese Dub

== Awards and nominations ==
Year	Award	Category	Work	Result
2017	Prêmio Multishow	Fiat Argo Experimente	Herself	Nominated
2017	Meus Prêmios Nick	Musical Revelation	Herself	Nominated
2017	Women's Music Event Awards	Revelation	Herself	Won
2018	Prêmio Multishow	Song of the Year	Pesadão	Won
2018	Latin Grammy Awards	Best Portuguese Language Contemporary Pop Album	Dona de Mim	Nominated
2023	Latin Grammy Awards	Best Portuguese Language Urban Performance	"Fé"	Pending
2020	Prêmio Multishow de Música Brasileira	Artista do Ano	Herself	Nominated

== See also ==
- List of Afro-Latinos
