= Letrux =

Brazilian singer-songwriter, actress and writer

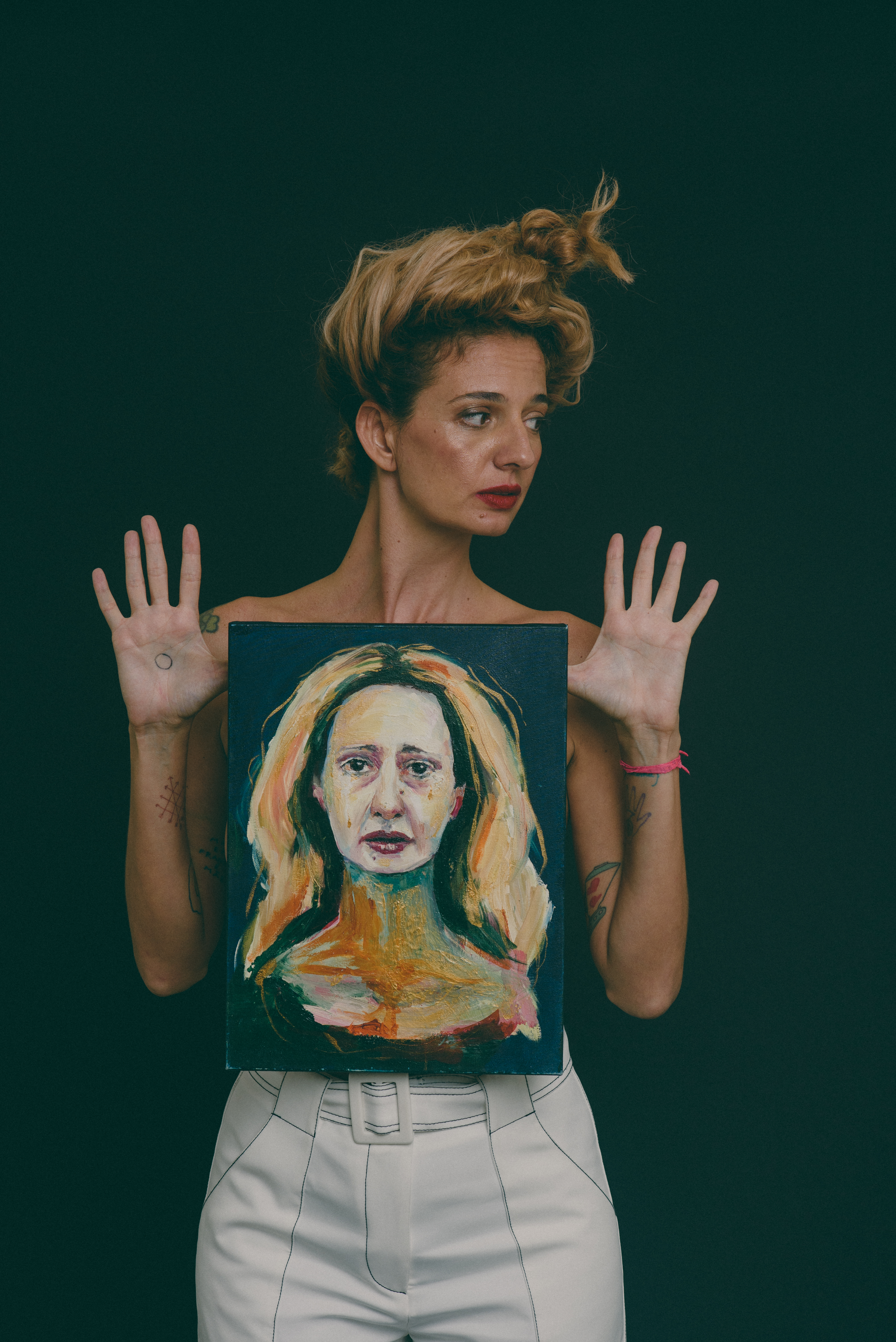
- "Letrux Aos Prantos" Photoshoot, 2020
- Born: Letícia Pinheiro de Novaes; 5 January 1982 (age 43); Rio de Janeiro, Brazil
- Occupation: Singer-songwriter
- Years active: 2006–present
- Musical career
- Genres: Electronic music, Experimental music, Pop, Indie

Letícia Pinheiro de Novaes, best known as Letrux (born 5 January 1982), is a Brazilian singer-songwriter, actress and writer.

== Biography ==
Born in Rio de Janeiro, Novaes studied acting at the Casa de Artes das Laranjeiras and literature at the Federal University of Rio de Janeiro. She approached music as a teenager, learning to play the guitar as a self-taught musician and founding the rock band Leticias and later the electronic music group Menage à trois. In 2008, she formed with her then boyfriend Lucas Vasconcellos the duo Letuce, with whom she recorded 3 albums.

In 2017, she embarked on a solo career, adopting the pseudonym Letrux. Her debut album, Letrux em Noite de Climão, won the Multishow Brazilian Music Award in the Best Album category. The album was also included in the list of the 10 best Brazilian albums of 2017 published by Rolling Stone. In 2020, she released her second album, Letrux aos Prantos; the album was nominated for Best Portuguese Language Rock or Alternative Album at the 21st Annual Latin Grammy Awards. Her album Letrux como Mulher Girafa was chosen by the Associação Paulista de Críticos de Arte as one of the 50 best Brazilian albums of 2023.

As an actress, Novaes took part to several films and TV-series starting from 2010. Also a writer, in 2015 she published a collection of poems entitled Zaralha: Abri a Minha Pasta.

== Discography ==
=== With Letuce ===
- Plano de Fuga pra Cima dos Outros e de Mim (2009)
- Manja Perene (2012)
- Estilhaça (2015)

=== Solo albums ===
Studio albums

- Letrux em Noite de Climão (2017)
- Letrux aos Prantos (2020)
- Letrux como Mulher Girafa (2023)

Live albums

- Letrux em Noite de Climão - Ao Vivo (2019)

Collections

- Letrux em Noite de Pistinha (2019)
