= Karol Conká =

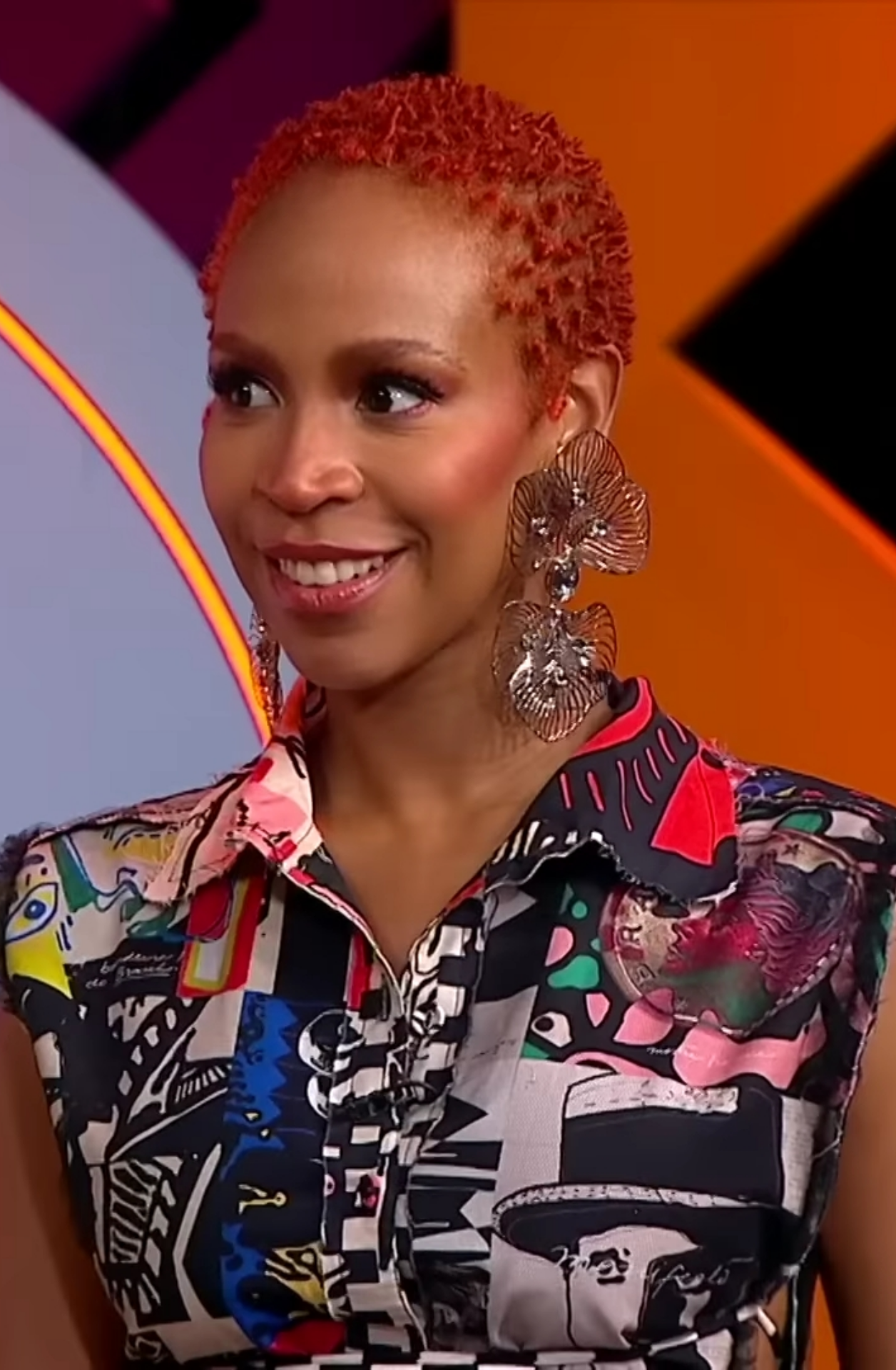
- Conká in 2023

Background information
- Born: Karoline dos Santos Oliveira; January 1, 1986 (age 40); Curitiba, Paraná, Brazil
- Genres: Hip-hop; pop; MPB
- Occupations: Rapper; songwriter; singer
- Years active: 2002–present
- Website: www.karolconka.com

Karoline dos Santos Oliveira (born January 1, 1986), known professionally as Karol Conká (Brazilian Portuguese: [kaˈɾɔw kõˈka]), is a Brazilian rapper, singer and songwriter. Her music is a blend of modern hip-hop and rap with sounds from Brazilian pop and traditional music.

== Career ==
In 2013, she won Multishow's Best New Artist award and released her debut album, Batuk Freak. Her song, "Boa Noite", is featured in the EA Sports video game, FIFA 14. Her album Ambulante was ranked as the 34th best Brazilian album of 2018 by the Brazilian edition of Rolling Stone magazine and among the 25 best Brazilian albums of the second half of 2018 by the São Paulo Association of Art Critics.

In January 2021, she was announced as a contestant of the reality show Big Brother Brasil 21. Her sarcastic and non-empathic behavior towards her housemates garnered a negative reception from the participants and viewers alike. On February 23, she was evicted from the reality show with a record-breaking 99.17% of the public vote.

Her life is depicted in the 2021 Globoplay documentary series A Vida Depois do Tombo.

In 2024, Karol Conká performed dressed as a four-leaf clover in the reality singing competition The Masked Singer Brasil.

== Personal life ==
Karol Conká publicly came out as bisexual and sapiosexual. She is an advocate of feminism.

== Discography ==
Albums

- 2001 - Karol Conka
- 2013 - Batuk Freak
- 2018 - Ambulante
- 2022 - Urucum

Singles

- 2011 - "Boa Noite"
- 2014 - "Tombei"
- 2015 - "É o Poder"
- 2017 - "Lalá"
- 2018 - "Kaça"
- 2018 - "Cabeça de Nego" (Prod. Instituto & Boss in Drama)
- 2019 - "Saudade"
- 2019 - "Nossa Que Isso" (feat. MC Rebecca & MC Rogê)
- 2019 - "Alavancô" (feat. Gloria Groove & Linn da Quebrada)
- 2021 - "Dilúvio" (feat. Leo Justi)
- 2021 - "Mal Nenhum"
- 2021 - "Subida"
- 2021 - "Louca e Sagaz"
- 2022 - "Paredawn"
