= Preta Gil =

Brazilian singer and actress (1974–2025)

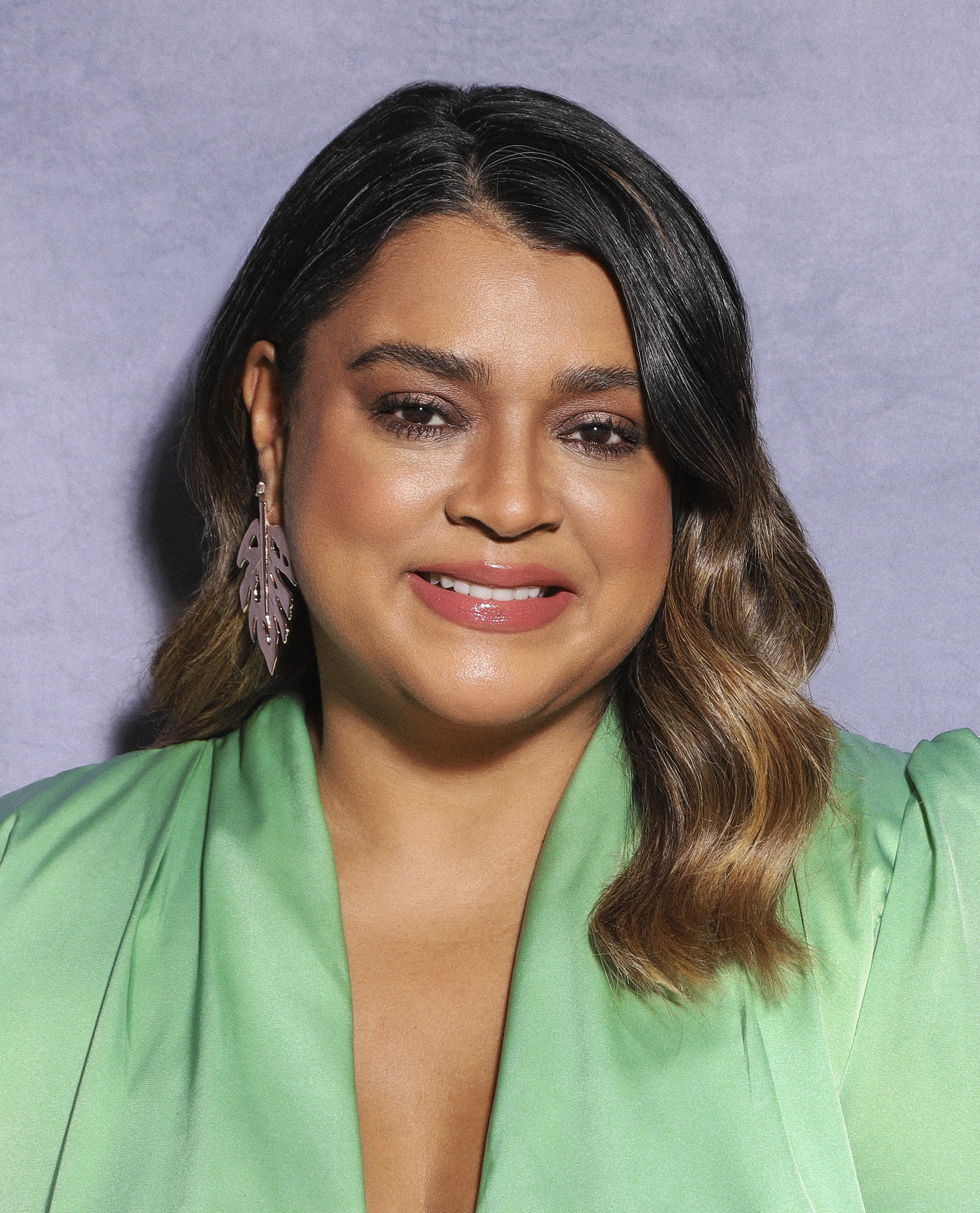
- Gil in 2021

Background information
- Born: 8 August 1974; Rio de Janeiro, Brazil
- Died: 20 July 2025 (aged 50) New York City, U.S.
- Genres: MPB; axé; pop
- Occupations: Singer; television host; actress; businesswoman
- Years active: 2003–2025
- Label: Universal Music
- Spouses: Otávio Müller (m. 1994; div. 1995) Rafael Dragaud (divorced) Carlos Henrique Lima (div. 2013) Rodrigo Godoy (m. 2015; div. 2023)
- Website: pretagil.com.br

Preta Maria Gadelha Gil Moreira (Portuguese pronunciation: [ˈpɾetɐ maˈɾiɐ ɡaˈdeʎɐ ˈʒiw moˈɾejɾɐ]), better known as Preta Gil (Portuguese pronunciation: [ˈpɾetɐ ˈʒiw]; 8 August 1974 – 20 July 2025), was a Brazilian singer, entrepreneur and television personality.

The daughter of Gilberto Gil, she has made a name for herself on the Brazilian music scene. Recognized for her vibrant personality, joyful music and strong defence of LGBTQIA+ rights, Gil stood out for her work both on stage and behind the scenes in the local music industry. She died at the age of 50 after a battle with colorectal cancer.

== Early life ==
Preta Maria Gadelha Gil Moreira was born in Rio de Janeiro, the daughter of singer-songwriter Gilberto Gil and Sandra Gadelha. (Note: In 1974, Gil's father, singer Gilberto Gil, went to a government office to register his daughter's name after his own mother's name. On arrival, the clerk informed him he was unable to register Preta as a name for his daughter. Gilberto Gil began to protest, "Why not? There's Branca (white), Clara (clear) and Rosa (rose) . . . why can't Preta (black) be a name?" The clerk would only agree if the name Preta accompanied a Catholic name. Thus, Gilberto Gil had to register his daughter under the name Preta Maria.) Also she was the first cousin of the singer and musician Moreno Veloso (son of Caetano Veloso with his first wife, Andrea Gadelha (Note: Andrea (who is also Preta Gil's aunt) is the younger sister of Sandra Gadelha, Preta's mother (she is two years younger than Sandra).)) and the second cousin of actress Patricia Pillar and pop singer Luiza Possi. (Note: Preta's mother, Sandra Gadelha is a first cousin of Patricia Pillar and Líber Gadelha, Luiza Possi's father.) She was also related to Brazilian rock singer Marina Lima.

Gil's early life was immersed in the world of music and entertainment, surrounded by a rich cultural heritage. At 16, she began working behind the scenes in the music industry, first as an intern at the Brazilian advertising agency DM9 and later as a producer at the video production company Dueto, where she was involved in creating music videos for artists such as Ivete Sangalo, Ana Carolina and Angelica.

== Career ==
=== Musical career ===
Gil's music was characterized by her lively, festive style with themes of empowerment, identity, and freedom. Her musical career began in 2003 with the release of the debut album, Prêt-à-Porter, a collection that showcased her fusion of Brazilian music traditions with contemporary pop influences. This work featured the hit single “Sinais de Fogo”, written by Ana Carolina and Antonio Villeroy, which became the biggest hit of her career and a staple in her live performances. The album's cover, which featured Gil posing nude, caused significant media attention and sparked debates on body image and societal conservatism. (Note: The idea was for the singer, in particular, to feel reborn. Once Gil finished photographing the pictures, she showed them to the label. But the record label was alerted and asked if she was sure that she wanted to use them because it might cause a 'scandal'. Innocently, Gil said that since she had to include other singers on the disc, singers who were also naked on the covers of their CDs, would help to make here less controversial. In a TV interview for GNT, the program Irritando Fernanda Young (literally "Annoying Fernanda Young"), Gil said, she liked to be fun and relaxed which, with all certainty wouldn't have been a problem if she were thin.)

In 2005, Gil released her second album, Preta, which solidified her as an established figure in Brazilian music. Despite the album's lower commercial impact compared to her debut, it allowed Gil to continue developing her sound and identity. It was in 2007 that she gained further recognition with her live show Noite Preta, which began in small venues but quickly became a sensation, particularly in the Brazilian gay community. The show eventually evolved into the album and DVD Noite Preta ao Vivo (2010), further cementing her place as an ally to the local LGBTQIA+ community.

A year earlier, the artist had created “Bloco da Preta”, a Rio carnival block that became one of the biggest in Rio de Janeiro in the mid-2010s. In 2018, it was the block with the largest audience at Rio's carnival, with 760,000 revellers. Bloco da Preta was also the name of the concert that celebrated Gil's 10-year career, which took place on 23 October 2013 at Citibank Hall in Rio de Janeiro. The concert featured Lulu Santos, Ivete Sangalo, Anitta, and Thiago Novaes and lasted three hours. The recording of this performance resulted in the release of the DVD/Blu-ray in the following year.

Gil also released two more studio albums in that decade that highlighted her versatility and willingness to experiment with various genres. Her third studio album, Sou Como Sou (2012), released “Batom”, another song by Ana Carolina in partnership with Chiara Civello and Diana Tejera. And the last studio album, Todas as Cores (2017), featured collaborations with prominent artists like Gal Costa, Pabllo Vittar, and Marília Mendonça, reinforcing her identity as an artist of diversity and joy. Todas as Cores included the hit "Vá se Benzer" and the electronic-infused samba "Decote," the latter of which featured a collaboration with Vittar, further showcasing Gil's embrace of diversity and progressive cultural values.

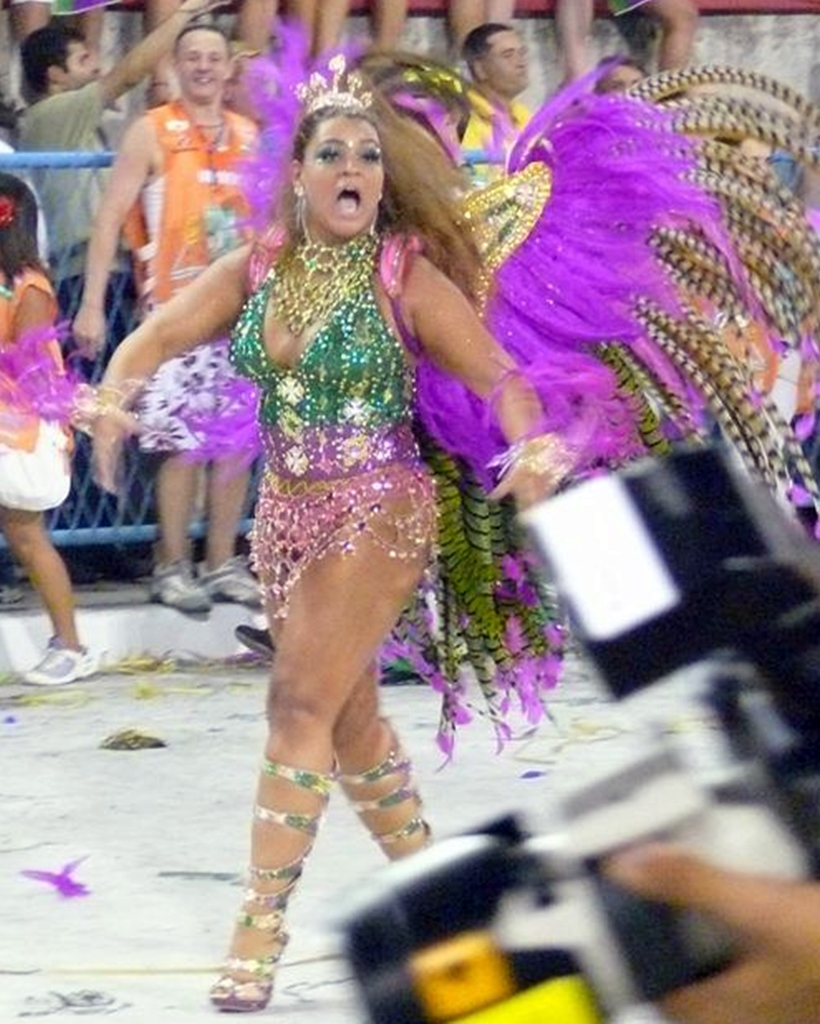
Gil in 2007

In addition to her work in music, Gil has also ventured into business with the founding partner in 2017 of Music2Mynd, an entertainment, digital culture and music marketing company that has made a name for itself in Brazil's entertainment sector. Music2Mynd represented artists such as Pabllo Vittar, Luísa Sonza, and Camilla de Lucas.

Throughout her life, Gil was deeply connected to her family, particularly her father, Gilberto Gil, with whom she often collaborated on music. Her final performance was in April 2025, alongside her father during his Tempo Rei tour.

=== Acting and television career ===
Alongside her musical career, Gil also explored acting and television presenting. In 2006, she starred in the musical Um Homem Chamado Lee and appeared in several television shows, including Os Mutantes (2007) and As Cariocas (2010). She also co-created and hosted the talk show Caixa Preta (2004), which addressed issues of race, gender, and empowerment in Brazilian society.

Gil's foray into television allowed her to further develop her public persona as a champion of social causes, particularly those affecting the Black and LGBTQIA+ communities. She used her platform to speak out about issues such as abortion rights and racial equality, often drawing on her own experiences as a Black woman in Brazil's entertainment industry.

== Personal life ==
In July 2020, Gil came out as pansexual. She made her sapphic relationships public as well, expressing she had been bisexual since birth, and that she was proud to be "black, fat and bi", and proud of her father also being bisexual. Gil already positioned against conservatism and reactionarism in Brazil.

Gil married actor Otávio Müller in 1994 and had a son, Francisco Gil, but the relationship ended in divorce in 1995. She later married Rodrigo Godoy in 2015, but that marriage broke down in 2023. In August 2024, she released an autobiography titled Preta Gil: Os Primeiros 50, in which herself detailed her life story, including personal challenges such as her struggle against cancer and her disturbed divorce.

Preta Gil's life and career are depicted in the 2026 documentary film Preta Gil - Eu Não Ando Só. She is also depicted in the 2026 Globoplay television documentary Meu Nome é Preta.

== Health issues and death ==
In January 2023, Gil was diagnosed with colorectal cancer. Despite her diagnosis, she continued to perform and interact with her fans, maintaining a strong presence on social media and sharing her journey with vulnerability and transparency. Although Gil went into remission later that year, the cancer recurred in August 2024, affecting four areas of her body, including a metastasis in the peritoneum, two lymph nodes and a nodule in the ureter. In a last-ditch attempt, she moved to the United States in May 2025 in search of advanced treatment at the Memorial Sloan Kettering Cancer Center. However, she died in New York City on 20 July 2025, 19 days before her 51st birthday.

On 15 September 2025, statues of Preta Gil and Gilberto Gil were inaugurated in a kiosk at the Copacabana Beach.

== Discography ==
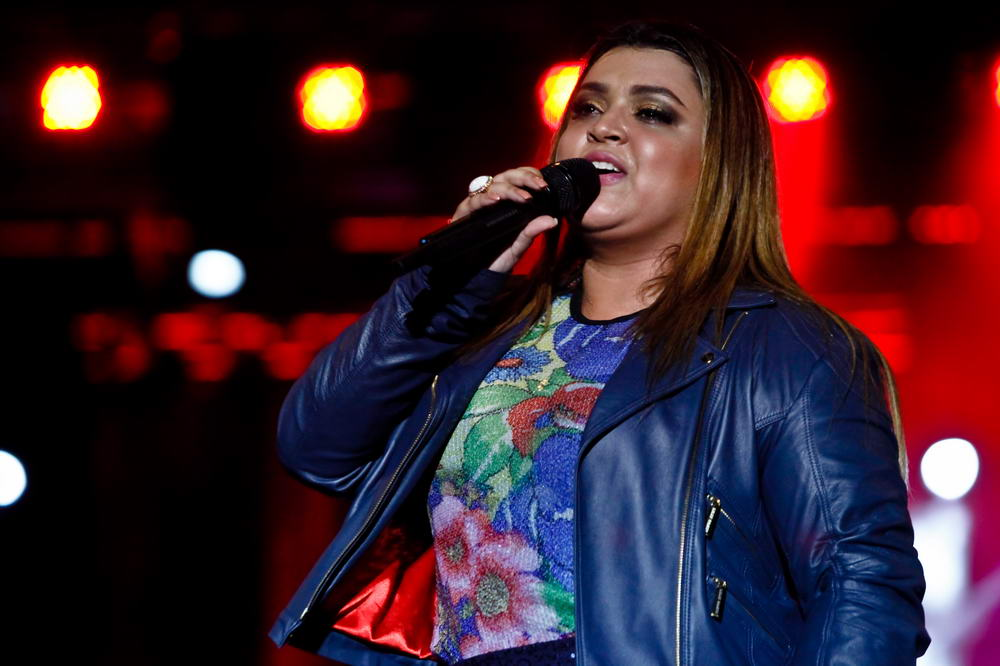
Gil performing in 2012

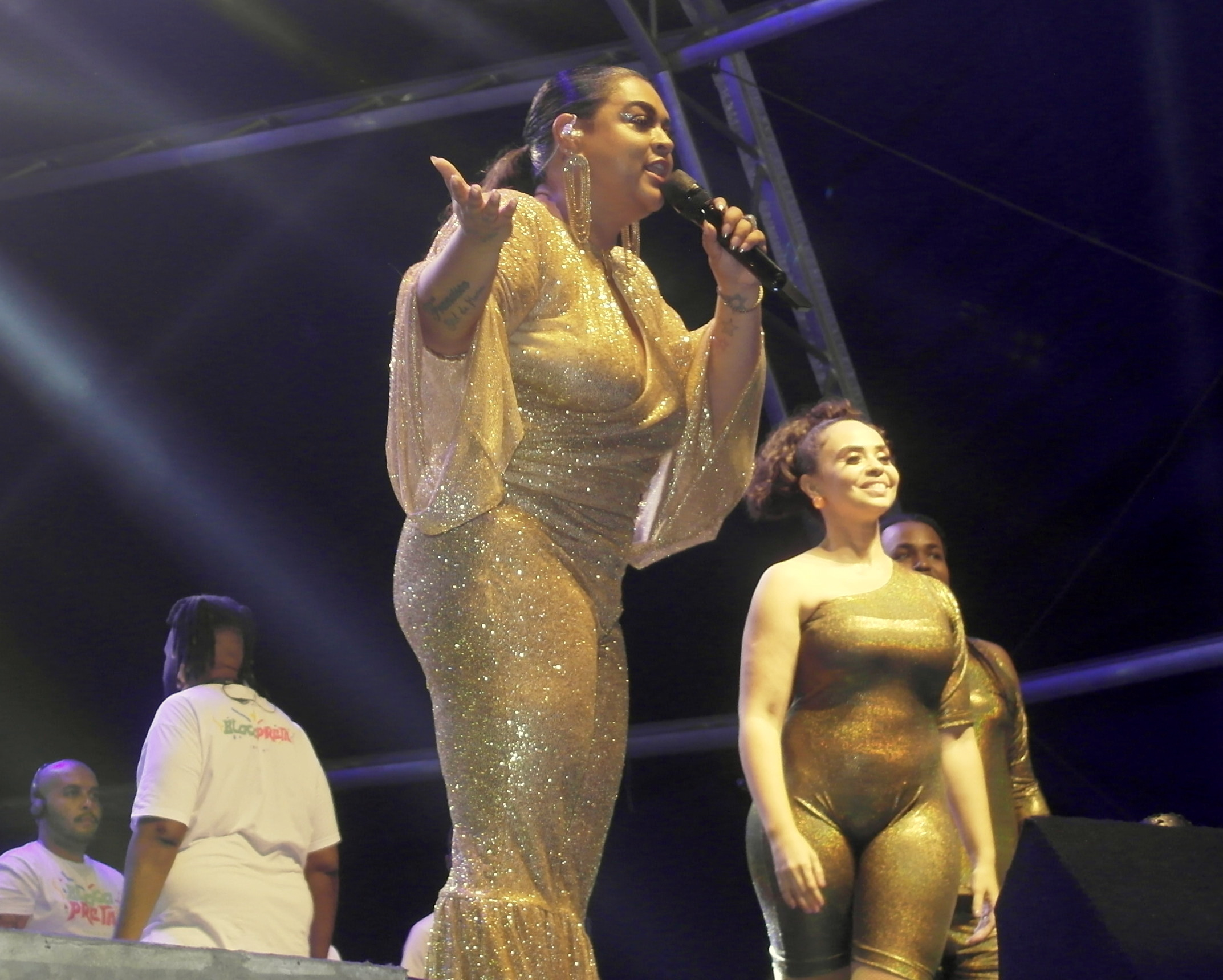
Gil performing in Angra dos Reis, 2023

=== Studio albums ===
List of albums, with selected chart positions and certifications
Title	Album details
Prêt-à Porter	Released: 2003; Label: Warner; Sales: 20,000
Preta	Released: 2005; Label: Universal; Sales: 20,000
Sou Como Sou	Released: 2012; Label: DGE Entertainment; Sales: 40,000
Todas as Cores	Released: 2017; Label: DGE Entertainment; Sales:

=== Live albums ===
List of albums, with selected chart positions and certifications
Title	Album details
Noite Preta Ao Vivo	Released: 2010; Label: Universal; Sales: 45,000
Bloco da Preta	Released: 2014; Label: Sony; Sales: 10,000

=== Video albums ===
List of albums, with selected chart positions and certifications
Title	Album details
Noite Preta Ao Vivo	Released: 2010; Label: Universal; Sales: 30,000
Bloco da Preta	Released: 2014; Label: Sony; Sales: 20,000

=== Singles ===
List of singles as lead artist, with selected chart positions, showing year released and album name
Title	Year	Peak chart positions			Album
Title	Year	BRA	BRA Regional Salvador	POR	Album
"Sinais De Fogo"	2003	1	—	1	Prêt-à Porter
"Andaraí"	2003	45	—	—	Prêt-à Porter
"Muito Perigoso"	2005	87	—	—	Preta
"Eu e Você, Você e Eu"	2005	35	—	—	Preta
"Mutante"	2007	28	—	—	Apenas Single
"Stereo"	2009	11	—	21	Noite Preta ao Vivo
"Meu Valor"	2010	72	—	—	Noite Preta ao Vivo
"Sou Como Sou"	2012	20	—	—	Sou Como Sou
"Mulher Carioca"	2012	—	—	—	Sou Como Sou
"Relax"	2013	—	—	—	Sou Como Sou
"Que Isso Neguinho?"	2014	—	—	—	Sou Como Sou
"Te Quero, Baby"	2015	78	—	—	—N/a
"Eu Quero e Você Quer"	2017	10	9	—	—N/a
"Decote" (Featuring Pabllo Vittar)	2017	8	—	—	Todas as Cores
"Vá Se Benzer" (Featuring Gal Costa)	2017	43	—	—	Todas as Cores
"Cheia de Desejo"	2018	—	—	—	Todas as Cores
"Excesso de Gostosura"	2019	82	—	—	—N/a
"Só o Amor" (Featuring Gloria Groove)	2019	34	—	—	—N/a

==== Featuring ====
List of singles as lead artist, with selected chart positions, showing year released and album name
Title	Year	Peak chart positions			Album
Title	Year	BRA	BRA Regional Salvador	POR	Album
"Carinho de Verdade" (Featuring with various artists)	2011	55	—	—	Single Only
"Meu Corpo Quer Você" (Naldo feat. Preta Gil)	2011	—	—	—	Na Veia Tour
"Amor, Amor" (Wanessa feat. Preta Gil)	2013	86	—	—	DNA Tour
"Esse Amor" (Rodriguinho feat. Preta Gil)	2013	—	—	—	O Mundo Dá Voltas
"Go, Gol" (Rodrigo Alexey feat. Preta Gil)	2014	—	—	—	One Love, One Rhythm

=== Tours ===
- 2008–2011: Noite Preta
- 2012–present: Baile da Preta

==== Block carnival ====
- 2009–present: Bloco da Preta

== TV work ==
Presenter and cast

- 2010: Vai e Vem - (GNT)
- 2005: Caixa Preta - (Band)
- 2012: The Voice Brasil
- 2011–2013: Esquenta!
- 2013: Fantástico

Online radio

- 2010: Noite Preta FM

Actress

- 2010: As Cariocas
- 2010: Ti Ti Ti
- 2009: Caminho das Índias
- 2008: Ó Paí, Ó
- 2008: Os Mutantes – Caminhos do Coração
- 2007: Caminhos do Coração
- 2003: Agora É que São Elas

Film

- 2006: Over the Hedge – Stella (Brazilian voice)
