= Simony (singer) =

Brazilian singer (born 1976)

- Born: Simony Benelli Galasso; 1 July 1976 (age 50)
- Origin: São Paulo, Brazil
- Genres: Children's music, Pop, pop rock, Música popular brasileira
- Occupations: Singer, songwriter, actress, author, TV host
- Instrument: Vocal
- Works: Turma do Balão Mágico
- Years active: 1982–present
- Labels: CBS Records; Sony Music; JT Records

Simony Benelli Galasso (born July 1, 1976) is a Brazilian singer and television presenter. She is most well known for being a member of child pop band Turma do Balão Mágico, which sold more than 10 million records. Since leaving the band, Simony has been a television presenter.

== Discography ==
=== Albums ===
with Turma do Balão Mágico

- A Turma do Balão Mágico (1982 album)
- A Turma do Balão Mágico (1983 album)
- A Turma do Balão Mágico (1984 album)
- A Turma do Balão Mágico (1985 album)
- A Turma do Balão Mágico (1986 album)

with Jairzinho

- Jairzinho & Simony (1987)
- Jairzinho & Simony (in Spanish) (1988)

Solo albums

- Sonhando Acordada (1989)
- Simonny (1995)
- Certas Coisas (1996)
- Simplesmente Eu (2001)
- Celebração (2005)
- Superfantástica (2008)
- Ela Cansou de Ser Forte (2020)

=== Singles ===
- 1987 - "Coração de Papelão"
- 1987 - "Meu Bem"
- 1989 - "Acho que Sou Louca"
- 1989 - "Só Você"
- 1995 - "Primeiros Erros"
- 1995 - "Pelo Menos Uma Vez"
- 1996 - "Quando Te Vi"
- 2001 - "Caixa Postal"
- 2001 - "Ficar por Ficar"
- 2004 - "Impossível Acreditar que Perdi Você"
- 2005 - "Resumo da Felicidade"
- 2006 - "Começo, Meio e Fim"
- 2008 - "Superfantástico"
- 2009 - "Ursinho Pimpão"
- 2010 - "Em Todo Caminhar" (with Maurílio Santos)
- 2010 - "Dependente do Seu Amor" (with Grupo Tapa no Couro)
- 2011 - "Segunda Chance" (with Brandy and Rony)
- 2011 - "Não Vai Dar" (with Grupo Desejos)
- 2012 - "Quando Chove" (with Grupo Sem Querer)
- 2012 - "Sonhos Pra Quem Quiser"

=== Soundtracks for telenovelas ===
- 1995: "Primeiros Erros" — Cara & Coroa
- 1996: "Quando Te Vi" — Salsa e Merengue
- 2004: "Impossível Acreditar que Perdi Você" — A Escrava Isaura
- 2006: "Começo, Meio e Fim" — Prova de Amor
- 2012: "Sonhos Para Quem Quiser" — Carrossel

== Filmography ==
=== Television ===
| Title | Year | Role | Notes |
|---|---|---|---|
| Balão Mágico | 1983-86 | Presenter | |
| Especial Amigos do Peito | 1984 | Presenter | |
| Especial Uma Viagem ao Mundo da Fantasia | 1985 | Presenter | |
| Nave da Fantasia | 1987-88 | Presenter | |
| Do Ré Mi Fá Sol Lá Simony | 1988-89 | Presenter | |
| Show da Simony | 1989-90 | Presenter | |
| Turma do Gueto | 2002–04 | Esther | Season 1–2 |
| Programa Giro | 2004 | Presenter | |
| Tudo a Ver | 2005 | Presenter | |
| Programa Raul Gil | 2012 | Juror | Episode: "Jovens Talentos Kids" |
| Power Couple Brasil | 2016 | Participant | Season 1 |
