= Artistas Reunidos =

Brazilian music project

The Artistas Reunidos was a music project by the solo artists Jair Oliveira, Wilson Simoninha, Luciana Mello, Max de Castro, Pedro Mariano, and Daniel Carlomagno. It was active from 1997 to 1998.

For a little more than a year, they shared the stage with many important Brazilian musicians such as Jair Rodrigues, Djavan, Ed Motta, Sandra de Sá, Vicente Barreto, and many others. On August 31st, 1999 they recorded the live album Projeto Artistas Reunidos at the club Blen Blen Brasil in São Paulo, Brazil. After the project ended, the six artists pursued their own careers and became popular as solo artists in Música popular brasileira (Brazilian Popular Music).
