= Now Westlin' Winds =

Poem by Robert Burns, now a Scottish folk song

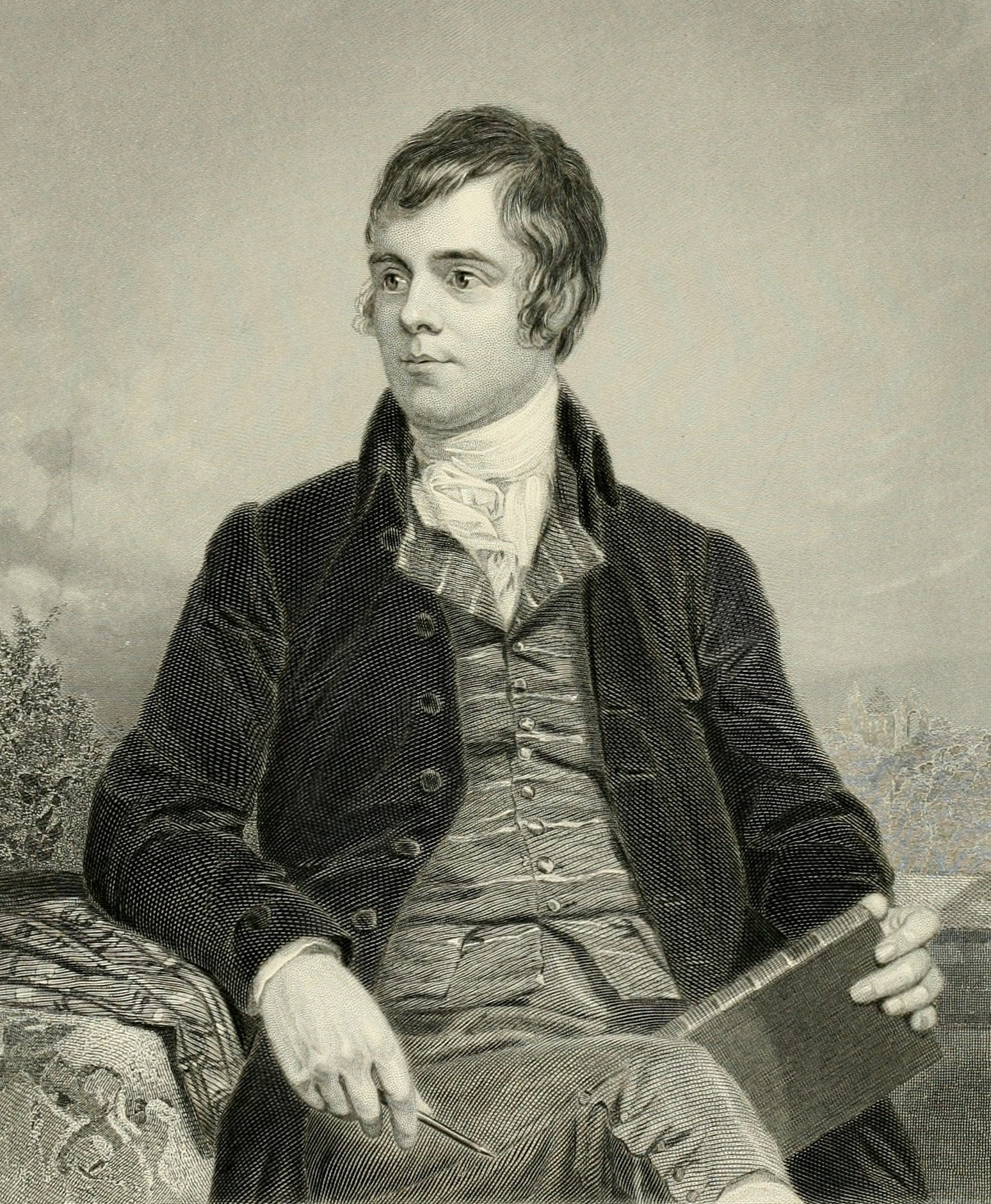
Robert Burns

Now Westlin' Winds is a love song and poem by Scottish poet Robert Burns, which was written in 1783 and is best known as a Scottish folk song, as adapted and sung in 1981 by Dick Gaughan and many others. Burns' original title was Composed in August. It was sung by Karine Polwart and Kirsty Grace, at the Royal Opening, by Her Majesty Queen Elizabeth II, of the Scottish Parliament in 2011.

It was recorded in spoken form for the BBC in 2014 by Bill Paterson. It formed part of the Scottish Literature Higher Poetry Studies national exam curriculum, and was chosen as the Herald Poem of the Day in August 2017.

== History ==
The poem is addressed to 'Peggy' a nickname for Margaret Thomson, of Kirkoswald, a childhood sweetheart, about whom Burns said 'a charming Filette who lived next door to the school overset my Trigonometry, and set me off in a tangent from the sphere of my studies'. He edited it for later loves like Jean Armour in his Commonplace Book (replacing her surname for 'Charmer' in lines 8 and 40, and Jeanie for 'Peggy' in line 25). The description of a Scottish autumn is unusually detailed and one commentator also noted that Burns continued to favour Peggy, even after ten years when he wrote it as he also believed he was heading overseas.

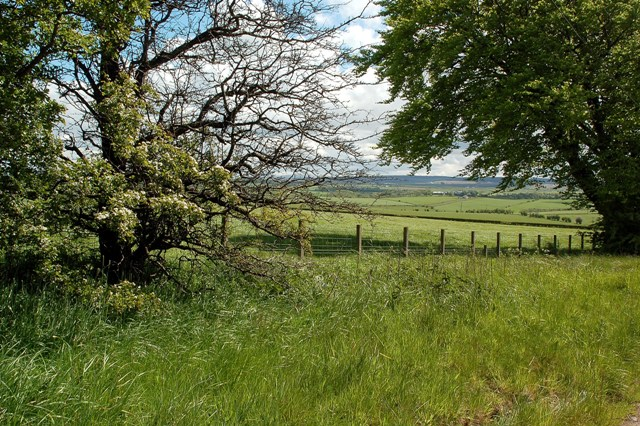
Farmland in Ayrshire

The autumn season on 12 August, known as the 'Glorious Twelfth' is the official start of grouse hunting, regulated by law, to permit culling wild birds which decimated crops of poor farmers in Scotland, initially, and now is a field sport hunt, often for wealthy tourists. The themes of man's cruelty or indifference to nature's beauty reflects themes in other poem's such as To a Mouse. The loved one is compared to the beautiful relationships within the natural world.

== Lyrics ==
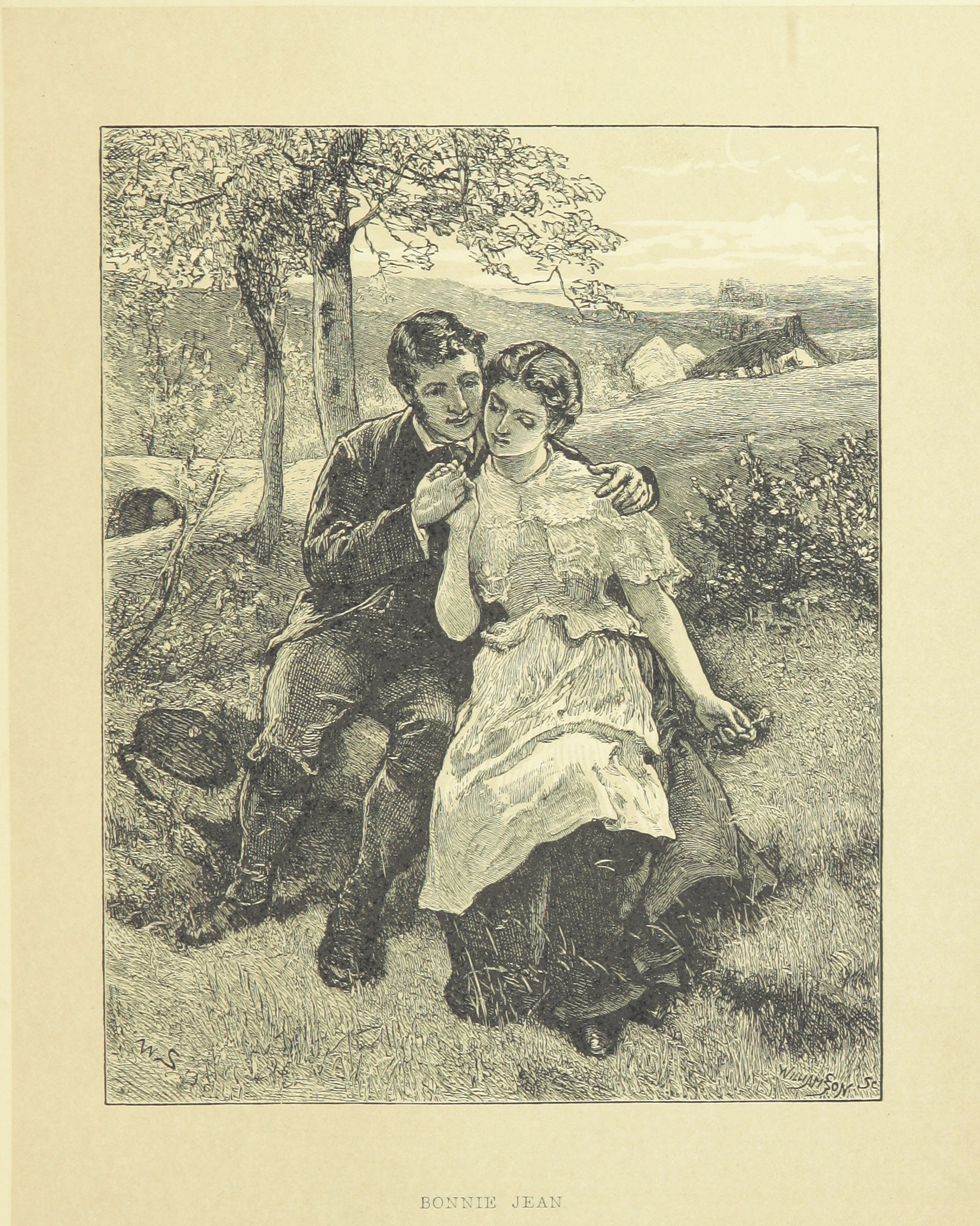
Young couple in the countryside, from The National Burns including the airs of all the songs, Rev. George Gilfillan (ed)

Now westlin winds and slaught'ring guns
Bring Autumn's pleasant weather;
The moorcock springs on whirring wings
Amang the blooming heather:
Now waving grain, wide o'er the plain,
Delights the weary farmer;
And the moon shines bright, as I rove by night,
To muse upon my charmer.

The paitrick loves the fruitful fells,
The plover loves the mountains;
The woodcock haunts the lonely dells,
The soaring hern the fountains:
Thro' lofty groves the cushat roves,
The path of man to shun it;
The hazel bush o'erhangs the thrush,
The spreading thorn the linnet.

Thus ev'ry kind their pleasure find,
The savage and the tender;
Some social join, and leagues combine,
Some solitary wander:
Avaunt, away, the cruel sway!
Tyrannic man's dominion;
The sportsman's joy, the murd'ring cry,
The flutt'ring, gory pinion!

But, Peggy dear, the ev'ning's clear,
Thick flies the skimming swallow,
The sky is blue, the fields in view,
All fading - green and yellow:
Come let us stray our gladsome way,
And view the charms of Nature;
The rustling corn, the fruited thorn,
And ilka happy creature.

We'll gently walk, and sweetly talk,
While the silent moon shine clearly;
I'll grasp thy waist, and, fondly prest,
Swear how I lo'e thee dearly:
Not vernal show'rs to budding flow'rs,
Not Autumn to the farmer,
So dear can be as thou to me,
My fair, my lovely charmer!

=== Modern version lyrics (Dick Gaughan) ===
Now westlin winds and slaughtering guns
Bring autumn's pleasant weather
The moorcock springs on whirring wings
Among the blooming heather
Now waving grain, wild o'er the plain
Delights the weary farmer
And the moon shines bright as I rove at night
To muse upon my charmer.

The partridge loves the fruitful fells
The plover loves the mountain
The woodcock haunts the lonely dells
The soaring hern the fountain
Through lofty groves the cushat roves
The path of man to shun it
The hazel bush o'erhangs the thrush
The spreading thorn the linnet.

Thus every kind their pleasure find
The savage and the tender
Some social join and leagues combine
Some solitary wander
Avaunt! Away! the cruel sway,
Tyrannic man's dominion
The sportsman's joy, the murdering cry
The fluttering, gory pinion.

But Peggy dear the evening's clear
Thick flies the skimming swallow
The sky is blue, the fields in view
All fading green and yellow
Come let us stray our gladsome way
And view the charms of nature
The rustling corn, the fruited thorn
And every happy creature.

We'll gently walk and sweetly talk
Till the silent moon shines clearly
I'll grasp thy waist and, fondly pressed,
Swear how I love thee dearly
Not vernal showers to budding flowers
Not autumn to the farmer
So dear can be as thou to me
My fair, my lovely charmer.

== Musical settings ==
Burn's originally proposed a tune called "I had a horse, I had nae mair" when the poem was published in the 'Kilmarnock edition', Poems Chiefly in the Scottish Dialect in 1786, but later changed it to be sung to 'Port Gordan', and then to 'Come kiss me, come clap me' in James Johnson's Scots Musical Museum. The version that is most commonly sung now is the Dick Gaughan version, from his 1981 album, A Handful of Earth.

An orchestral version was composed by James Macmillan, for a world premiere, in the Usher Hall, Edinburgh, on 21 March 2024, and is due a Swedish premiere in February 2026.

Paige Turley sang Now Westlin' Winds at BBC Scotland's Burns Night 2026 with the Scottish Symphony Orchestra.

== See also ==
- Robert Burns
- Robert Burns's Commonplace Book 1783–1785
- Poems, Chiefly in the Scottish Dialect
- Scots Musical Museum

== Further information ==
- Dick Gaughan recording: https://www.youtube.com/watch?v=vZ7oYCx6tBw
- Karine Polwart recording: https://www.youtube.com/watch?v=DmlNmuEl310&t=1227s
- Jean Redpath recording (to tune 'I had a horse, I had nae mair'): https://www.youtube.com/watch?v=6IE7GdFaUuY
- Iona Fyfe and Michael Biggins recording: https://www.youtube.com/watch?v=C0gw-zyWUDg

More information on performances and recordings: https://mainlynorfolk.info/folk/songs/nowwestlinwinds.html

More information on the song's history as part of Scottish folk music

More information on Burns writings in the National Library of Scotland
