= Fofão =

Fictional character

Fofao
- Balão Mágico character
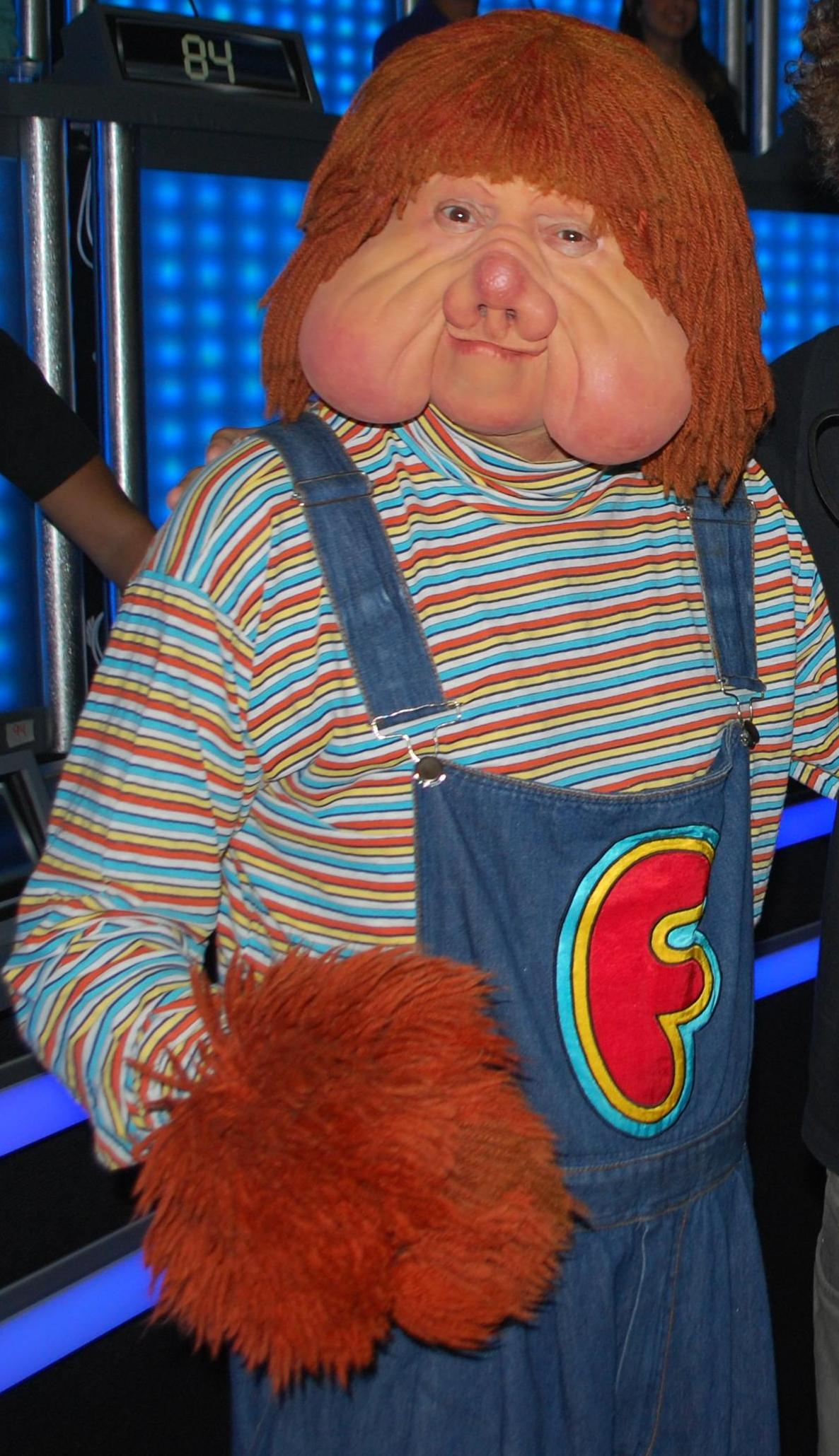
- 2010 photograph of Fofão on the set of Um contra Cem (1 vs. 100)
- First appearance: 1983
- Created by: Orival Pessini
- Portrayed by: Orival Pessini
- Voiced by: Orival Pessini

In-universe information
- Gender: Male
- Nationality: Brazilian

Fofão (Portuguese pronunciation: [foˈfɐ̃w̃]) is a fictional character from the Brazilian children's TV series Balão Mágico and TV Fofão. He's a magical alien from a fictional planet called Fofãolandia who was portrayed by Brazilian actor and humorist Orival Pessini. He became a hit amongst Brazilian kids in the early 1980s, having his own TV show, discs, dolls, and many other licensed products.

== Origins ==
The character's first appearance was in the morning children's television program Balão Mágico in 1983, as a supporting character to the children's musical group. However, the character became very popular, arriving to become one of the icons of Brazilian media during the 80s, mainly due to high sales of a plush toy based on the character. After the end of the original program in 1986, the character won a solo program in the same year, broadcast by Rede Bandeirantes until 1989, called TV Fofão (with a return between 1994 and 1996). The last appearance of the character on television was in 1998 by the channel CNT Gazeta.

In 1989, the character starred in a theatrical movie titled Fofão e a Nave Sem Rumo. The character has also led to several other licensed products and sold numerous albums of children's songs during the 80s and 90s.

== Creation ==
According to Orival Pessini, Fofão was created at the request of TV Globo director José Bonifácio de Oliveira Sobrinho (a.k.a. Boni), who needed a child character for the program Balão Mágico, which would debut in a few months, and any character that was created would go on the air. Orival had never worked with children and had no idea what to create, imagined various possibilities, such as a dog, a pig, a clown, a teddy bear, an alien, or a human being, after thinking, he decided to mix all the imagined alternatives, resulting in Fofão. Another inspiration that Orival had to create Fofão was Steven Spielberg's E.T, which according to him, "E.T was very ugly, with a disgusting appearance and his head looking like an inverted foot, but he had a great heart and was very charismatic", so decided to create a similar character.

== Controversy and legacy ==
In the late 1980s, an urban legend surrounding the plush toy of the character sparked significant controversy. The legend suggested that the doll contained a knife inside its body, purportedly intended for nefarious rituals and harming children. The toy was even likened to Chucky from the Child's Play horror film series. The mystery was partially validated when it was discovered that the doll did indeed have a pointed hard plastic piece acting as its spinal cord.

In 2016, Fofão experienced a resurgence in popularity on the internet thanks to a group of street performers called “Carreta Furacão,” which became a viral meme in Brazil. The group featured various amateur artists dressed as popular culture icons, including Popeye, Captain America, Mickey Mouse, and Fofão himself, among others. Videos of the performers dancing and doing acrobatics on the streets gained popularity on YouTube, and the group became an internet meme. Among the characters portrayed, Fofão stood out as the most prominent and was often regarded as the group's leader. Nevertheless, Orival Pessini, the creator of Fofão, objected to the use of his character in political activities and took action to prevent it. Consequently, the group made alterations to the generic character based on Fofão.

On October 14, 2016, Orival Pessini, the creator of Fofão, died at the age of 72 due to spleen cancer.
