= A Turma do Balão Mágico (1984 album) =

1984 studio album by Turma do Balão Mágico

Studio album by Turma do Balão Mágico
- Released: September 21, 1984
- Genre: Children's music
- Length: 42:16
- Label: CBS Records

Singles from A Turma do Balão Mágico

A Turma do Balão Mágico is the third studio album by Brazilian band Turma do Balão Mágico, released on September 9, 1984, by CBS Records. According to Manchete magazine the album sold 1.5 million copies by 1985. According to O Globo a further 2.5 million copies were sold. It was the first album to feature the new member Jair Oliveira.

== Track List ==
=== Side A ===
1. "É Tão Lindo" (with Roberto Carlos)
2. "Quadrinhas e Um Refrão"
3. "Se Enamora"
4. "Mãe, Me Dá Um Dinheirinho" (with Pepeu Gomes and Baby Consuelo)
5. "Zip e Zap"
6. "Bombom"

=== Side B ===
1. "Amigos do Peito" (with Fábio Júnior)
2. "Meu Mocinho, Meu Cowboy"
3. "Dia dos Pais"
4. "Tia Josefina"
5. "Palha e Aço"
6. "Dia de Festa" (with Fofão)

== Bibliography ==
- Barcinski, André (2014). Pavões Misteriosos — 1974-1983: A explosão da música pop no Brasil. São Paulo: Editora Três Estrelas. (ISBN 978-85-653-3929-2)
