= Turma do Balão Mágico =

Brazilian children's music group

- Origin: Rio de Janeiro, Brazil
- Genres: Children's music
- Years active: 1982–1986
- Label: Columbia Records
- Past members: Simony (1982-1986); Tob (1982-1985); Mike (1982-1986); Jairzinho (1984–86); Ricardinho (1985–86); Luciana Mello (1986); Luciana Benelli (1986)

Turma do Balão Mágico ("English: The Magic Balloon Gang") was a Brazilian children's music group active between 1982 and 1986. The children also starred the TV show, Balão Mágico.

The group released six albums under the Columbia label, together selling a total of 13 million copies and drawing up to 60,000 people in concerts. Their biggest hit is the song "Superfantástico" or "Superfantastic".

== Members ==
- Simony (Simony Benelli Galasso): The only girl in the band;
- Tob (Vimerson Canavilas Benedicto): The oldest member of the group;
- Mike (Michael Biggs): Son of infamous British robber Ronnie Biggs;
- Jairzinho (Jair Oliveira): Son of Brazilian musician Jair Rodrigues;
- Ricardinho (Ricardo Batista): The last member to join the group.

== History ==
=== Group beginnings ===
In 1981, Simony Benelli appeared on television singing on the television show Raul Gil. After the positive responses, she (about 5 years of age) was invited by Tomas Muñoz to form a musical group. In the same year, Vímerson Cavanillas Benedicto appeared at freshmen shows, called "calouros" in Brazil, and was a success in commercials and parades. When he knew that he would make a child group, his brother brought him for a test in the recording company. Having passed, he was immediately invited to form a "duo" with Simony, who already agreed.

With the group in his hands, the songs were recorded immediately, with Edgard Poças writing the lyrics, saying that he should "translate" lyrics that were successful outside of Brazil.

Accepting the proposal, Edgard tried to avoid what the recording company was saying, getting the rhythms and creating his own lyrics, mixing with some lyrics from famous Brazilian songs. Thus, "A Turma do Balão Mágico" was born. Not long after, after the album was finished, Ronald Biggs was kidnapped and brought to the Caribbean, and his son, Michael Biggs, said on national TV for his father to be brought back, moving the entire country. Munõz therefore called Ronald and asked if Michael knew how to sing, mostly saying that he only knew how to sing "Oh, Suzana", while playing. In response, Munõz removed the song from the disc and recorded a solo with Michael, who received the affectionate nickname of Mike.

Vímerson Cavanillas was too much of a complicated name for children, so the recording company picked the last syllable of his name (Benedicto) and joined it with the first, forming "Tobe" or Tob.

With the three boys, the record was released in 1982, selling over a million copies. There was also a clown mask as a bonus with the LP. "O Balão Mágico" then started to do shows all over Brazil, accompanied by a gigantic technical team and clowns.

=== Second album and program on Globo ===
Thanks to the huge success that the first album had achieved, CBS made the group its priority and Munõz took charge of assembling a second album, calling Edgard Poças again to assemble it. The repertoire focused more on school, friends and romance (an evolution granted by Edgard to accompany the growth of children). Edgard was instructed to make a more pop and dance record, with few elements of MPB. Every time he tried to incorporate the genre into the arrangements, he was greeted with comments like "Oh! Here comes Tom Jobim". Renowned guest appearances were called, like Djavan (in the track "Superfantástico"), Baby Consuelo ("Together") and an improved arrangement. Released in September 1983, the second album broke a record: In the Christmas week alone, the record sold over 1 million copies, growing every time. The success was so great that Balão had won a program on Rede Globo (in March 1983) and received a major upgrade, with more animations, longer runtime, etc. It was also in Balão Mágico that Orival Pessini created a character just for children that until today is a national reference for all ages, the Fofão, an alien and intergalactic being, a mixture of man, dog, pig, clown, ET and others.

=== Television success, new member and third album ===
With a record in hand and the daily program proposal on the country's main broadcaster readily accepted, A Turma do Balão Mágico was preparing for this moment, amid shows and program presentations, to release a new album. For the new repertoire, the label was looking for a new member, to debut with the new phase of Balão. During this preparation, something happened in Italy: Jair Oliveira sang on a television program with his father, Jair Rodrigues, the success "Io e Te". On his return to Brazil, Jair Rodrigues already had an appointment scheduled with the rekwown soccer player Pelé. With the cancellation of Pelé's participation, the boy had to sing alone, leaving the crowd gaping. The record company took advantage of the situation and invited him to join the group and so he took the place, of what would have been a girl, at the premiere of the program. Jair Oliveira, nicknamed Jairzinho, was the big addition. In the same year, Simony was crucial to the return of the group Os Trapalhões as a quartet.

The children were growing up fast; Tob, then 13, no longer fit with children's songs, while Simony (8) and Mike (10) also grew up. Knowing this, CBS decided to revamp the group and invited Edgard Poças to produce the new album, and he then made a repertoire with songs aimed at teenagers. For the great romantic focus of the album, the song "Se Enamora" was recorded, a success abroad (El Amore) and also imported here. With Tob and Simony as the main performers, the album had 12 songs and a mini toy theatre was added to put together as a bonus gift.

In September 1984, Turma do Balão Mágico's third album debuted. For most people, it is the group's best album, once again breaking records, and its hits continued to play on radio and TV. O Balão had finally achieved absolute success, and reigned in the child / youth audience. The demand for new shows increased, along with the audience of the television program. With all this success, the Balloon also carried out an advertisement for vaccination against rabies. In the following month, celebrating Children's Month, Rede Globo exhibited a special of the Magic Balloon Group, entitled The Magic Balloon Group em Amigos do Peito , which was a program by Augusto César Vannucci, was created by Stil, Edi Newton and Paulo Netto, written by Wilson Rocha, directed by Paulo Netto. Augusto César Vannucci was still the general director of the program.

However, the following year brought major lineup changes that eventually led to the departure of the group.

=== Tob's departure, Ricardinho's entry and fourth album ===
After the resounding success of Turma do Balão Mágico in the previous year, CBS bet everything on the band. The program leveraged high ratings, and the third album was still breaking sales records. Som Livre brought together the biggest members of MPB for the recording of a special disc in celebration of the genre, among them was Balão Mágico. In the same year, Tob, then 14 years old, was going through a sudden change of voice. The MPB record was recorded, and Balão re-recorded the song "A Banda", by Chico Buarque.

Achieving more and more success, the fourth LP started to be produced and assembled. In the program, the games continued and the audience continued to rise. But in the second half of 1985, O Balão suffered a great drop; owing to the change of voice and the sudden growth of the member, CBS would remove Tob from Balão Mágico and from the Globo program, replacing him with Ricardinho, a new 10-year-old member who had made his debut in the group. With the sudden low and an LP in production, Simony, Jairzinho, Mike and Ricardinho recorded the fourth album. The LP was a commercial success, with gifts being a check to open a savings account at Caixa and a toy merry-go-round to assemble. Despite the success in public and sales, the Balloon started to lose its gas, having to suffer the consequences of the new formation.

Rede Globo aired a special by Turma do Balão Mágico, entitled A Turma do Balão Mágico Nº 2 . The Special was a program by Augusto Cesar Vannucci, written by Daltony Nóbrega and Stil, final written by Wilson Rocha, edited by João Henrique Schiller, directed by Vicente Burger, directed by Paulo Netto and directed by Augusto Cesar Vannucci.

Sales began to decline, and with members growing rapidly, the year 1986 would mark the end of Turma do Balão Mágico.

=== Fifth album and end of group ===
In March 1986 Simony left Rede Globo – but not the group – to have a deal with another TV company, Rede Manchete, where she would present her solo program, the Nave da Fantasia. At the same time, Mike and Ricardinho decided to leave the group and television program. With that, Rede Globo decided to end children's programming, however, as Xou da Xuxa would start in June in the same timeslot, or program was presented for just these three months only by Jairzinho, Castrinho and Ticiane Pinheiro, who came from Band, where he hosted the "TV Criança". In Mike and Ricardinho's places, Luciana Benelli, Simony's cousin who already participated in the television program, and Luciana Mello, Jairzinho's sister, joined. Orival Pessini signed a contract with Band, where he hosted "TV Fofão". The fifth and last album, A Turma do Balão Mágico was released in October together with a tour across Brazil until December, when the group officially ended .

=== Group's return in 2018 ===
The program "Balão Mágico" turned 35, on March 7, 2018. Former members of Turma do Balão Mágico, Mike, Tob and Simony without Jair Oliveira, Castrinho, Fofão, Luciana and Ricardinho, returned to perform together in April 2018, with several appearances on television shows, concerts and festivals.

=== Documentary ===
Star+ released a documentary about the band.

== Discography ==
Year	Details of Album	Singles	Certification
1982	A Turma do Balão Mágico: Label(s): CBS Records; Format(s): LP, Cassette, CD	A Galinha Magricela, Baile dos Passarinhos, O Trenzinho, Charleston, Tem Gato Na Tuba.	Brazil:2× Platinum; Brazil: 800,000
1983	A Turma do Balão Mágico: Label(s): CBS Records; Format(s): LP, Cassette, CD	Superfantástico, Ursinho Pimpão, Amigo e Companheiro, Juntos, Ai! Meu Nariz e Mãe-Iê.	Brazil: Diamond; Brazil:1,300,000
1984	A Turma do Balão Mágico: Label(s): CBS Records; Format(s): LP, Cassette, CD	Amigos do Peito, Se Enamora, É Tão Lindo, Quadrinhas e um Refrão e Me Dá Um Dinheirinho.	Brazil: Diamond; Brazil: 1,500,000
1985	A Turma do Balão Mágico: Label(s): CBS Records; Format(s): LP, Cassette	Barato Bom É Da Barata, Tic Tac, Não Dá Para Parar A Música e Chega Mais Um Pouco	Brazil: Diamond; Brazil:1,000,000
1986	A Turma do Balão Mágico: Label(s): Som Livre; Format(s): LP, Cassette	Roda Roda Pião; Boa Vida; Salsita;O Que Cantam As Crianças; Menina;Paratchibum e Felicidade.	Brazil:2× Platinum; Brazil:600,000

== Bibliography ==
- Barcinski, André (2014). Pavões Misteriosos — 1974-1983: A explosão da música pop no Brasil. São Paulo: Editora Três Estrelas. ISBN 978-85-653-3929-2.
