= Scots Musical Museum =

Book by Robert Burns

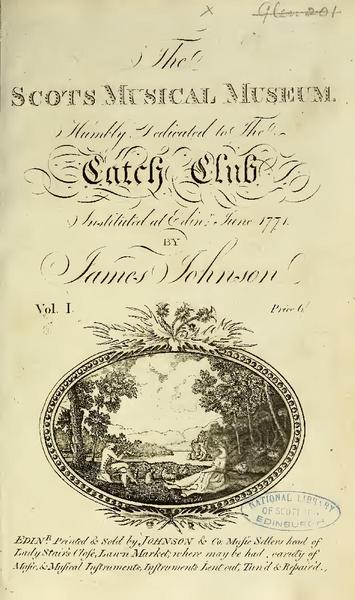

The Scots Musical Museum was an influential collection of traditional folk music of Scotland published from 1787 to 1803. While it was not the first collection of Scottish folk songs and music, the six volumes with 100 songs in each collected many pieces, introduced new songs, and brought many of them into the classical music repertoire.

The project started with James Johnson, a struggling music engraver / music seller, with a love of old Scots songs and a determination to preserve them. In the winter of 1786 he met Robert Burns who was visiting Edinburgh for the first time, and found that Burns shared this interest and would become an enthusiastic contributor. The first volume was published in 1787 and included three songs by Burns. He contributed 40 songs to volume 2, and would end up responsible for about a third of the 600 songs in the whole collection as well as making a considerable editorial contribution. The final volume was published in 1803 and contained the first printing of Handsome Nell, Burns' first song.

As well as collecting old songs, Burns wrote new words to old tunes, and many of the songs now attributed to Burns have older roots. Songs in the collection include Auld Lang Syne, Lord Ronald, my Son (better known as Lord Randal) and My love is like a Red, Red Rose. Burns' songs include The Battle of Sherramuir, Scots Wha Hae, Green Grow the Rashes, Flow Gently Sweet Afton, Ye Banks and Braes of Bonnie Doon, Ae Fond Kiss, The Winter it is Past, Comin' Thro the Rye, There Grows a Bonnie Brier Bush, Composed in August, and John Anderson, My Jo.

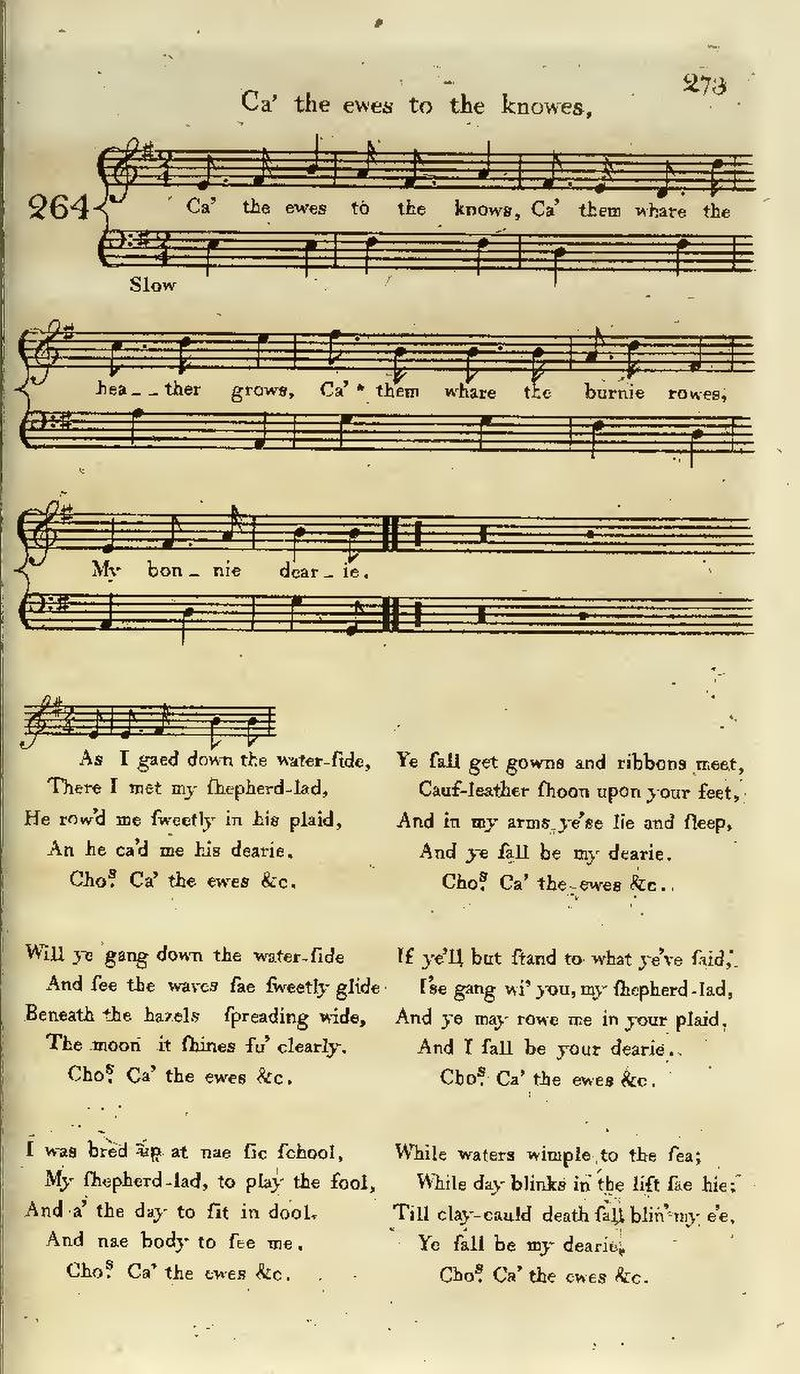
Ca' the Yowes.

The earliest issues of the ‘Museum’ did not identify the songs that were by Burns as in 1787 his fame had yet to imbed itself, however in later issues his name was appended to his contributions in the index and the text often had the declaration "Written for this Work by Robert Burns." Therefore the fewer songs ascribed to Burns in an issue, the earlier the issue.

The 'Museum' was issued totally uncut, in plain boards and without any lettering. The earliest version of the title-page does not have a border around the vignette. Later versions have a border and a thistle design is present at the top and bottom.

The collection became popular internationally, and songs and tunes were arranged by composers such as Joseph Haydn and Ludwig van Beethoven. Burns collaborated with George Thomson in A Select Collection of Original Scottish Airs, published from 1793 to 1818, which adapted Scottish folk-songs with "classical" arrangements. While this brought songs to new audiences, many of the songs and tunes continued in the folk tradition, both in Scotland and America.

The American collector John Gribbel was at one time in possession of Robert Burns's Interleaved Scots Musical Museum, the first four volumes of Johnson's "Scots Musical Museum" interleaved with some 140 pages of Robert Burns's explanatory notes on the 184 songs that he contributed. These volumes had long been in the possession of the Riddell family of Friars Carse in Nithsdale. These notes have provided many insights into the authorship and editing of the songs he contributed.
