= Handsome Nell =

1774 song by Robert Burns

- by Robert Burns
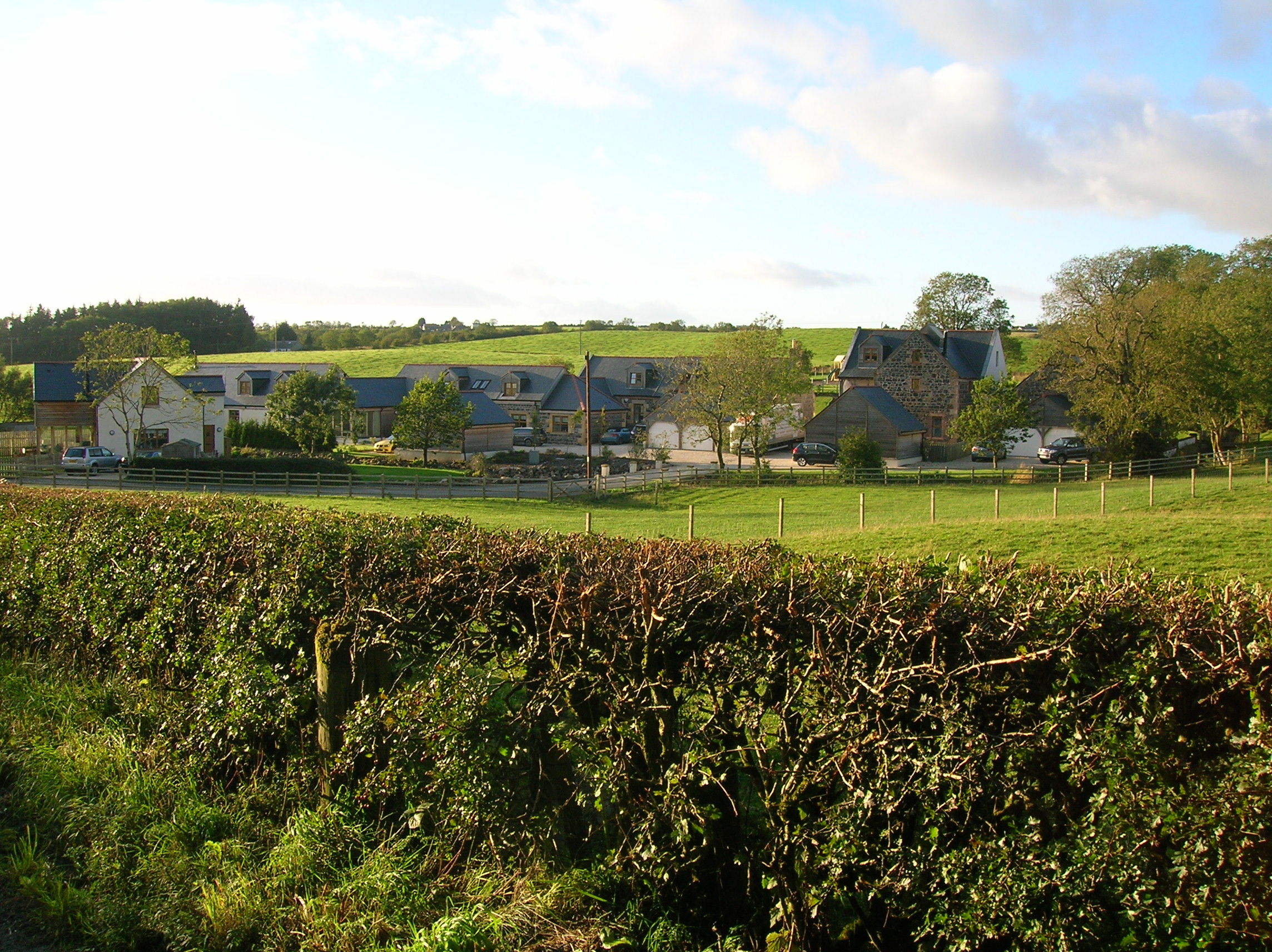
- Purclewan Mill, home to Nelly Kilpatrick
- Written: Autumn 1774
- First published in: 1803
- Country: Scotland
- Language: Scots
- Form: Song
- Publisher: James Johnson

Full text
- The Book of Scottish Song/Handsome Nell at Wikisource

Handsome Nell was the first song written by Robert Burns, often treated as a poem, that was first published in the last volume of James Johnson's Scots Musical Museum in 1803 (No.551) with an untitled tune. Burns recorded in holograph on page three of his first Commonplace Book that he wrote the song or Rhyme at the age of only fifteen whilst living at Mount Oliphant Farm, it is regarded as his earliest production, inspired by a farm servant aged fourteen, named either Nelly Kilpatrick or Nelly Blair. Some confusion exists as he also gave his age as 16 in his autobiographical letter to Dr. Moore; the autumn of 1774 is generally accepted.

== The song ==
In the song, by 1783 set to the tune I am a man unmarried, beauty is relegated to secondary importance and female virtue, grace, innocence and modesty are made out to be more desirable than looks alone. Handsome Nell was the first written of Burns's many love songs, marking in words the start of his preoccupation with women and love.

It was not published during Burns's lifetime although it figured in his first commonplace book and in the Stair Manuscript that he gave to Mrs Alexander Stewart of Stair. It was therefore not included in the 1786 Poems, Chiefly in the Scottish Dialect or in any of the later editions of 1787, 1793 and 1794 and was likewise absent from the Glenriddell Manuscripts of 1791.

Handsome Nell or O once I lov'd a bonnie lass

O once I lov'd a bonnie lass,
Aye, and I love her still;
And whilst that virtue warms my breast,
I'll love my handsome Nell.

Fal lal de dal etc.

As bonnie lasses I hae seen,
And mony full as braw;
But for a modest gracefu' mein,
The like I never saw.

A bonny lass I will confess,
Is pleasant to the e'e,
But without some better qualities
She's no a lass for me.

But Nelly's looks are blythe and sweet,
And what is best of a',
Her reputation is compleat,
And fair without a flaw;

She dresses ay sae clean and neat,
Both decent and genteel;
And then there's something in her gait
Gars ony dress look weel.

A gaudy dress and gentle air
May slightly touch the heart,
But it's innocence and modesty
That polishes the dart.

'Tis this in Nelly pleases me,
'Tis this enchants my soul;
For absolutely in my breast
She reigns without controul.

== The identity of Handsome Nell ==
Burns himself did not identify her by her surname and the first name he gave, Nelly or Nellie, is used as a nickname for "Helen." Some significant doubts exist about the actual identity of Burns's first romantic love. It was thought at first to be Nelly Blair and an unsigned letter to The Scotsman in 1828 testified to this. Burns's youngest sister, Isobel, however gave the name Nelly Kilpatrick to Robert Chambers in her eightieth year and this information must at best have been second hand, for Isobel was only three years old in 1774 and serious doubt must be cast on her recollections from this stage in her life.

Isobel stated that Nelly Kilpatrick was the daughter of the blacksmith of Purclewan Mill. Nelly Kilpatrick would only have been only a few weeks younger than Robert, however he wrote that his Nell was a year younger than himself. It was not until the Robert Chambers's edition of 1851 that Nelly Kilpatrick was substituted for Nelly Blair, so Allan Cunningham (1834), Robert Chambers (1838) and John Wilson (1846) do not credit her as being Burns's first love interest.

== The background to the song ==
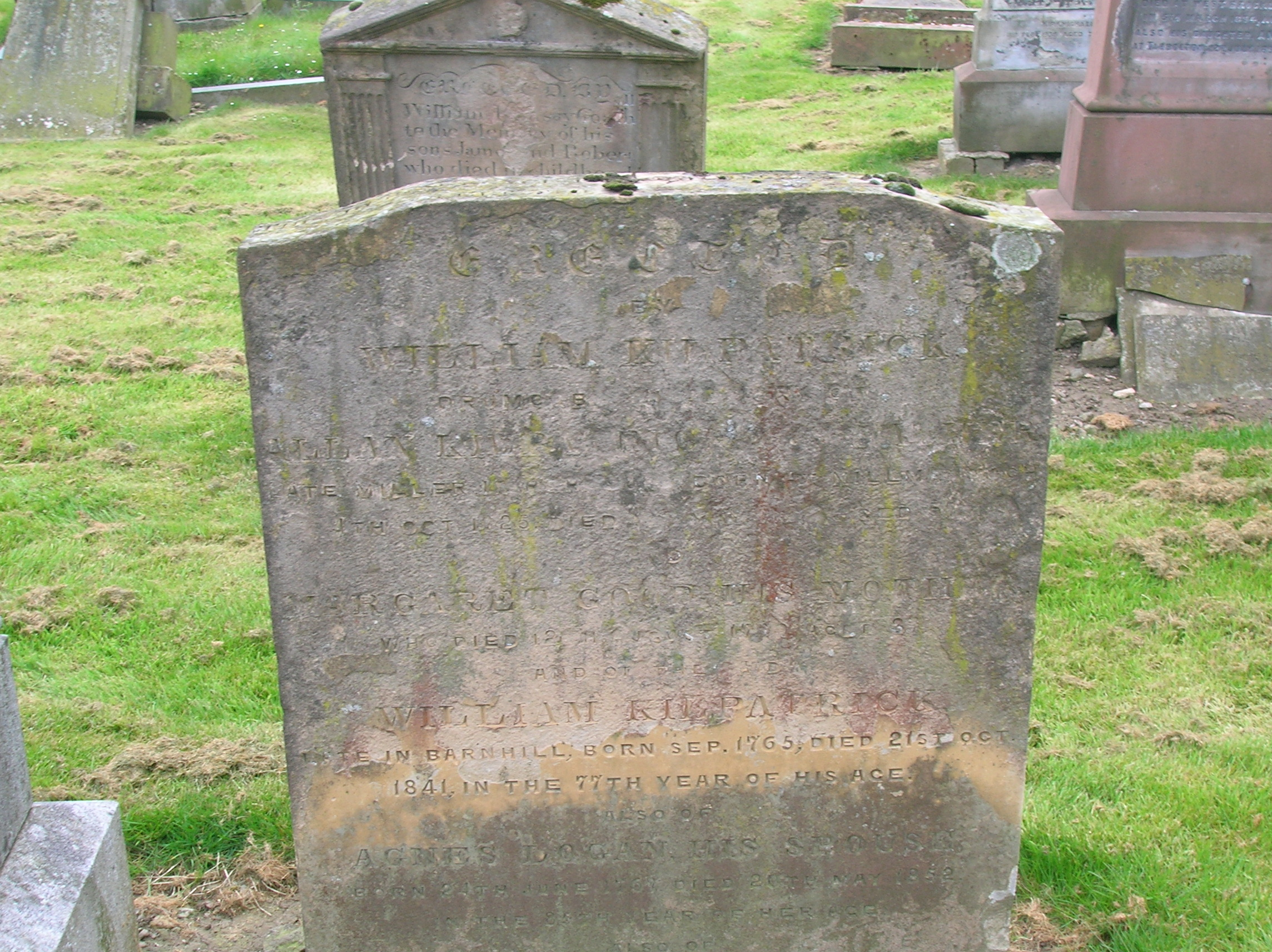
The gravestone of Nelly Kilpatrick's parents at Low Coylton churchyard

When Robert Burns was 15 he met "Handsome Nell", his first young love, a "bonnie, sweet, sonsie lass", although he apparently never told her of his love. Nelly Kilpatrick's married name was Nelly Bone. Nelly and Robert are first recorded to have met when William Burnes hired some extra help to bring in the harvest while they were at nearby Mount Oliphant Farm and Burns came to be paired with her, following the Ayrshire custom of that time. It has been suggested that Nelly Kilpatrick attended the country dancing school at Dalrymple when Burns was in his seventeenth year.

In his autobiographical letter to Dr. Moore he wrote: "You know our country custom of coupling a man and a woman together as Partners in the labors of Harvest. In my fifteenth autumn, my Partner was a bewitching creature who just counted an autumn less ... she altogether unwittingly to herself, initiated me in a certain delicious Passion .. Indeed, I did not not well know myself I liked so much to loiter behind with her when returning in the evening from our labours; why the tones of her voice made my heart-strings thrill like an Aeolian harp, and particularly why my pulse beat such a furious rantann when I looked and fingered over her hand to pick out the nettle-stings and thistles. Among her other love-inspiring qualifications, she sung sweetly, and 'twas her favourite reel to which I attempted giving an embodied vehicle in rhyme. Thus with me began Love and Poesy; which at times have been my only, and till within this last twelvemonth have been my highest enjoyment."

== Composition & criticism ==
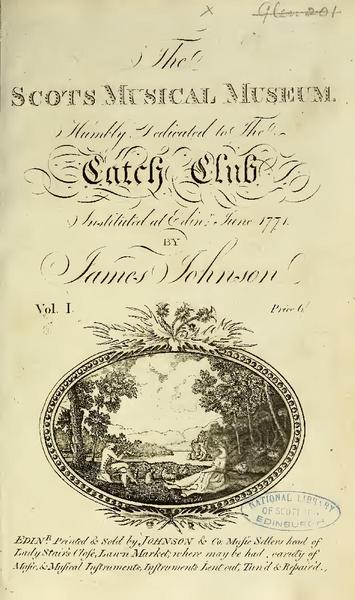
The title page of James Johnson's Scots Musical Museum

"The following composition," says Burns, in his Commonplace Book, "..was the first of my performances, and done at an early period of my life, when my heart glowed with honest warm simplicity, unacquainted and uncorrupted with the ways of a wicked world. The performance is, indeed, very puerile and silly, but I am always pleased with it, as it recalls to my mind those happy days when my heart was yet honest, and my tongue was sincere. The subject of it was a young girl, who really deserved all the praises I have bestowed on her. I not only had this opinion of her then—but I actually think so still, now that the spell is long since broken, and the enchantment at an end."

Burns had written "Handsome Nell" whilst the family lived at Mount Oliphant Farm, near Alloway in the autumn of 1774. In the first Commonplace Book written at Ellisland Farm he deleted "virtue" in the first stanza and substituted it with "honor" and wrote that: "Lest my works should be thought below criticism; or meet with a Critic who, perhaps, will not look on them with so candid and favorable an eye; I am determined to criticise them myself."

=== First stanza ===
The first distich* of the first stanza is quite too much in the flimsy strain of ordinary street ballads; and on the other hand, the second line is too much in the other extreme. The expression is a little awkward, and the sentiment too serious.

=== Second stanza ===
Burns wrote that ..I am well pleased with; and I think it conveys a fine idea of that amiable part of the sex --- the agreables; or what in our Scotch dialect we call a sweet sonsy lass.

=== Third stanza ===
Burns wrote that it has a little of the flimsy turn in it; and the third line has rather too serious a cast.

=== Fourth stanza ===
Burns wrote that this is a very indifferent one; the first line is, indeed all in the strain of the second stanza, but the rest is mostly an expletive.

=== Fifth stanza ===
Burns wrote that The thoughts in the fifth stanza come finely up to my favourite idea of a sweet sonsy lass; the last line halts a little.

=== Sixth stanza ===
Burns wrote that The same sentiments are kept up with equal spirit and tenderness. ..but the second and fourth lines ending with short syllables hurt the whole.

=== Seventh stanza ===
Burns wrote that it has several minute faults; but I remember I composed it in a wild enthusiasm of passion, and to this hour I never recollect it, but my heart melts, and my blood sallies at the rememberance.·

- A distich is a couplet, consisting originally of a hexameter and pentameter line, containing a single idea, as exemplified in the Greek Anthology.
