= Balão Mágico =

Brazilian children's television series

- Genre: Children's
- Created by: Nilton Travesso
- Directed by: Rose Nogueria; Edi Newton
- Presented by: Orival Pessini; Simony; Mike; Tob; Jarzinho; Ricardinho; Ticiane Pinheiro
- Starring: Castrinho; Luciana Benelli
- Composer: Luciana Benelli
- Country of origin: Brazil
- Original language: Portuguese
- No. of series: 4

Production
- Producer: Luciana Benelli
- Camera setup: Multi camera
- Running time: 120 minutes
- Production company: Central Globo de Produção

Original release
- Network: Rede Globo
- Release: 7 March 1983 – 28 June 1986

Balão Mágico ("Magic Balloon") was a children's television program in Brazil that aired between 1983 and 1986. The children, who were the main stars of the program, were also part of a children's musical group, Turma do Balão Mágico ("The Magic Balloon Gang"), which was active between 1982 and 1986.

The show introduced the popular character Fofão.

Balão Mágico aired on Brazilian television network Rede Globo from 1983–1986. The show's success led to Fofão receiving a solo show after Balão Mágico ended in 1986.

== Production ==
In 1982, realizing the success of the children's programs Bambalalão, by TV Cultura, and Bozo, by SBT, Rede Globo decided to create its own program aimed at children and with a circus theme, like the competitors, selecting the director Nilton Travesso to conceive the project. The director invited Simony, who was successful as a member of the children's group Turma do Balão Mágico, to present the program alongside Orival Pessini as the character Fofão, naming the attraction as Balão Mágico '. The program premiered on March 7, 1983 and included Castrinho as the clown Cascatinha and Simony's cousin, Luciana Benelli.

After three months, due to the public's estrangement, the broadcaster decided to include Mike and Tob in the presentation, the other two members of Turma do Balão Mágico, and, in 1984, Jairzinho joined the group and also on the program. In 1984 Tob left the group and was replaced by Ricardinho, who also joined the program instead.

As a result, the broadcaster decided to put an end to the program, but as the Xou da Xuxa would debut only in June at the time, the attraction started to be presented in those three months only by Ticiane Pinheiro, who vineyard of the very successful TV Criança in Band.

== Cast ==
The show's main cast comprised:

- Simony (Simony Benelli Galasso): The only girl in the band
- Tob (Vimerson Canavilas Benedicto): The oldest member of the group
- Mike (Michael Biggs): Son of infamous British robber Ronnie Biggs
- Jairzinho (Jair Oliveira): Son of Brazilian musician Jair Rodrigues
- Ricardinho (Ricardo Batista): The last member of the group
