= Robert Burns's Commonplace Book 1783–1785 =

Collection of poems, letters, songs and observations

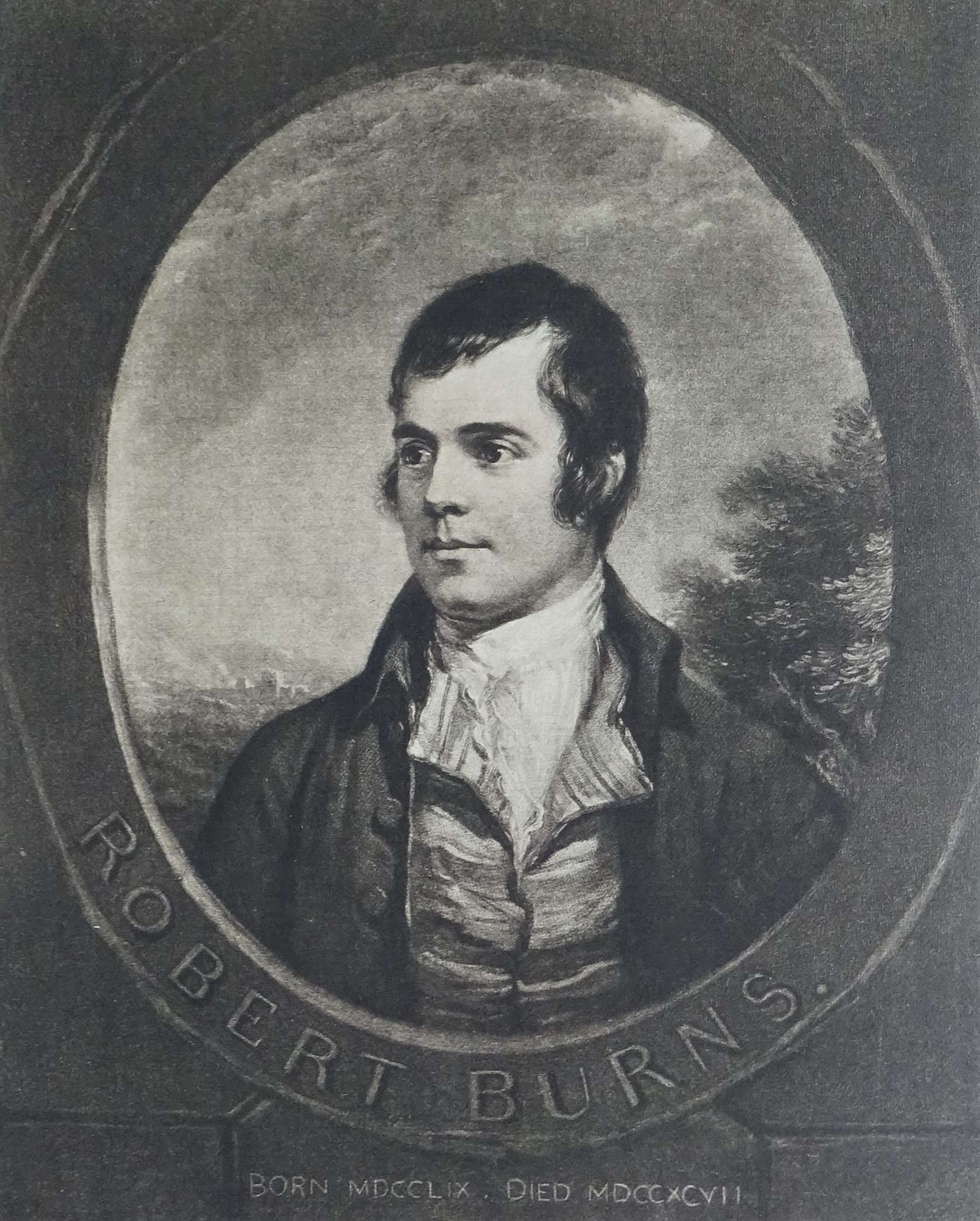
- Engraving after A. Nasmyth from the 1938 facsimile
- Author: Robert Burns
- Language: Scots
- Genre: Poetry, letters and lyrics
- Publication place: Scotland

Robert Burns's Commonplace Book 1783–1785 is the first of three commonplace books that were produced by the poet. The contents cover drafts of songs and poems, observations, ideas, epitaphs, etc.

== Commonplace Books ==
Robert Burns's three Commonplace books, 1783 to 1785, a second 1787 to 1790 and a third 1789 to 1794. are personal compilations of early drafts of songs, prose and some poetry as well as observations on people, places and ideas. Copies of poetry, excerpts from books, quotations, moral, religious and philosophical, contemplative, etc. are included. Such books are unique to the author's particular interests and often include passages found in other texts accompanied by the compiler's comments.

The term "Commonplace" derives from the Latin expression locus communis which translates as "a general or common topic". Generally the individual concerned collects material which have a common theme. Although they are private collections of information, they are not diaries. Keeping such a book was usually the pastime of the aristocracy with their ample leisure time, education and refinement.

Another definition is:

"..on its most basic level a blank book into which passages were transcribed from books and other thoughts, remarks, anecdotes, and occurrences recorded. They existed primarily to record their owner's reading, acting as a filing system not only for the contents of the books that they had read, but also, commonly, for comments on their reading experience".

According to John Logan Lockhart, Gilbert Burns stated that the Commonplace book had originally been acquired with the intention of recording farming memorandums within its pages. This presumably refers to a now lost fourth Commonplace Book, probably started in 1784 at Mossgiel and used to note farming matters as well as drafts of original poems and songs, including notes on songs intended for James Johnson after 1788.

Isabella Burns had a jotting-book used to record simple transactions by William Burness also had records by Robert. Isabella was in the habit of cutting out sections of the jotter for souvenir hunters who visited her at her Belleisle home. This may or may not have been distinct from the lost fourth Commonplace Book.

It was during the later productive involvement with the Tarbolton Bachelors' Club that he started the first commonplace book.

== Burns's First Commonplace Book ==
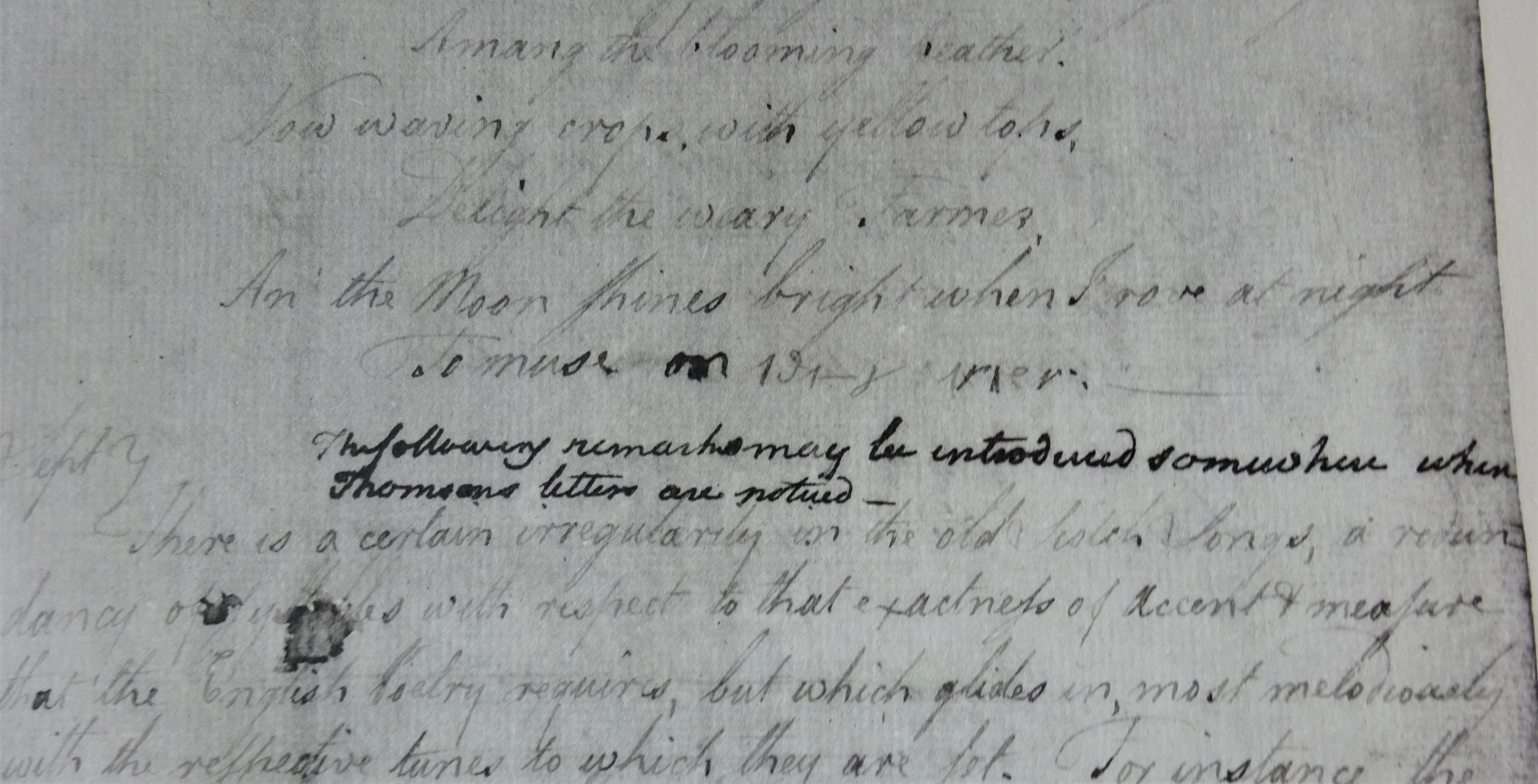
Burns's use of a cypher in Now Westlin' Winds

The first entry is April 1783, a date at which the practically unknown 24 year old Burns was living at Lochlie Farm near Tarbolton, South Ayrshire. The last, incomplete entry, is for October 1785 by which time Burns was at Mossgiel Farm near Mauchline.

Robert's youngest brother John died of unknown causes on 28 October 1785 and is buried in an unmarked grave at Mauchline.

The contents are of considerable value to those researching Robert Burns's life, personality, literary methodology, works and relationships. The abrupt abandonment is likely to relate to his efforts at composing new poems and revising existing works with thoughts of publication in mind. His final entry makes clear his ambitions for a literary career however he had still failed to send his work to any newspaper or journal.

His introduction reads much like the Rules and Regulations of the Bachelors' Club in formal style. A number of mock epitaphs appear in the preliminary pages of the book as well as the reverential Epitaph on my Honoured Father. A number of trial pieces are present, as well as essays, self criticism, experiments in blank verse, expressions of his hopes, ambitions and some philosophising.

In August 1785 Burns added a version of Now Westlin Winds to the book and unusually rendered the name Jeany Armour in cypher in the final verse. Mackay speculated that this may be because he was aware that Isabella Burns, his youngest sister, was in the habit of secretly reading his compositions. The frequent quotations throughout from philosophers, poets and writers illustrate the unusual breadth and width of his reading as a farmer at the age of 24.

=== The Abridged Glenridell Manuscript version ===
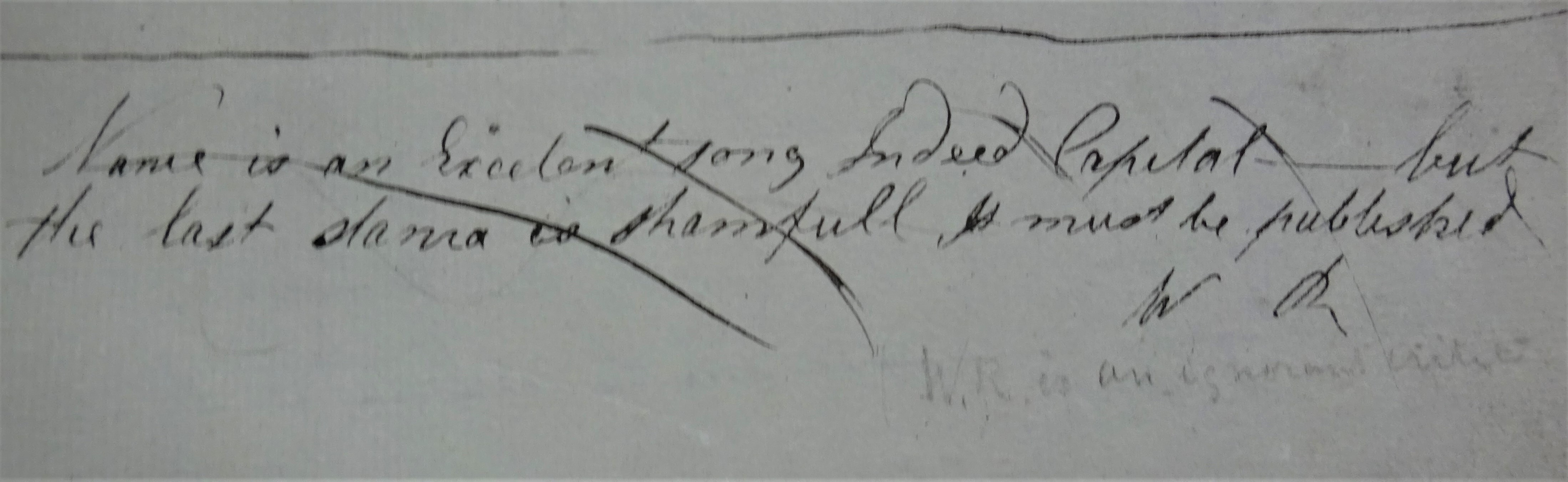
Ignorant critic comment on W.R.

Burns prepared an abridged version of his First Commonplace Book of 1783–1785 for the second volume of the Glenriddell Manuscripts. He was still working on the second volume in late 1793. As stated, the folio has 42 pages and about 1250 lines of manuscript whilst the quarto abridgement covers pages 31 to 42, twelve pages with 232 lines of manuscript. Only two pieces of poetry are included, being 22 lines beginning Of all the numerous ills that hurt our peace and 20 lines of experimental blank verse beginning All devil as I am, a damned wretch.

Burns prefaced the abridgement: On rummaging over some old papers, I lighted on a M.S.S. of my early years, in which I had determined to write myself out; as I was placed by Fortune among a class of men to whom my ideas would have been nonsense. I had meant that the book would have lain by me, in the fond hope that, some time or other, even after I was no more, my thoughts would fall into the hands of somebody capable of appreciating their value. At the end of the abridgement he wrote This is all that, & perhaps more than, is worth quoting, in my M.S.S.

=== Sequence of works ===
The pages are numbered from 2 to 42 in Burns's own hand, with pages 1, 43 hard to read or absent and page 44 not apparently numbered. Page 1 carries the descriptive title Observations, Hints, Songs, Scraps of Poetry, etc. by Robt Burness; ... Page 2 was left blank by Burns, but was written on by John Syme. Page 44 was and remains entirely blank.

=== Comments, notes, additions and alterations ===
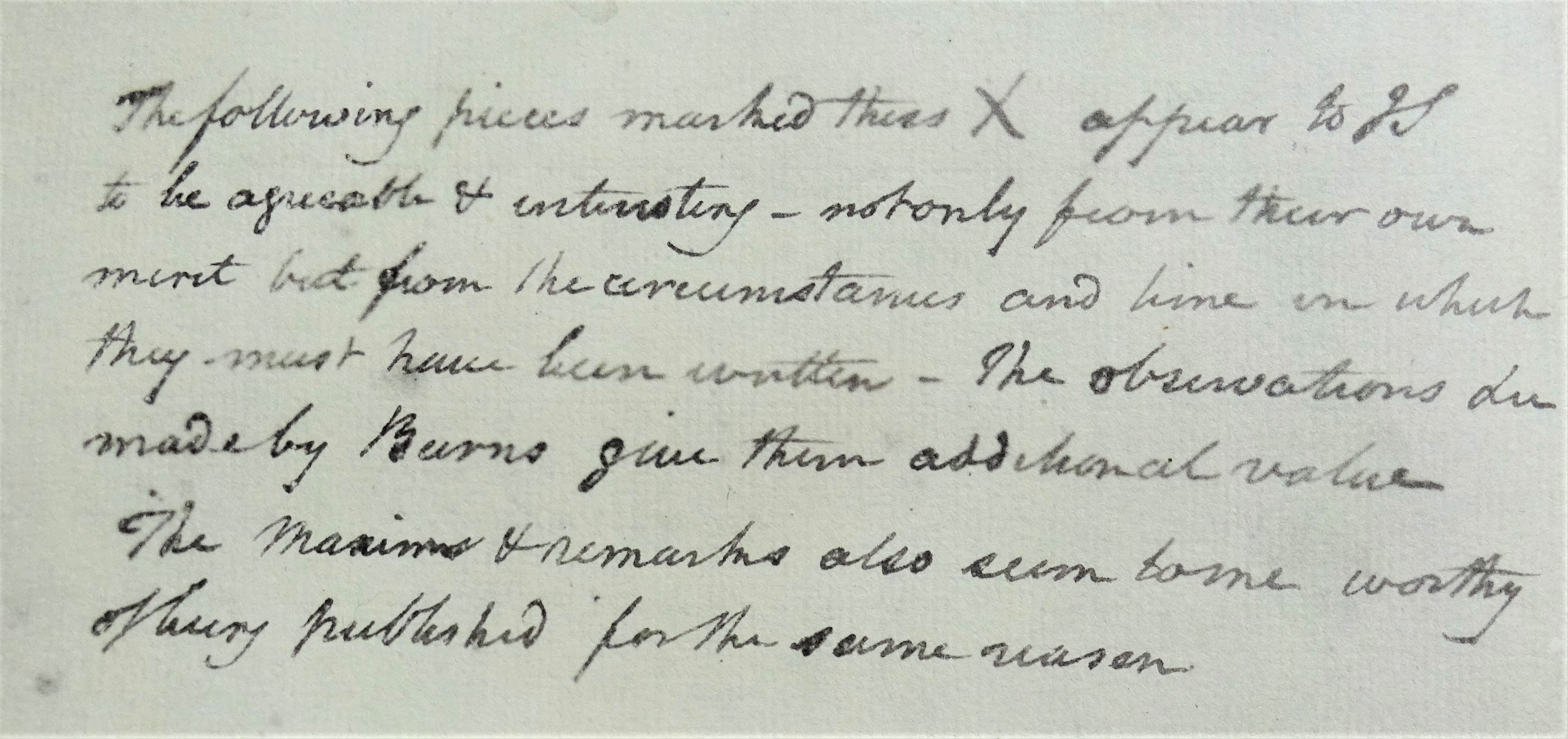
John Syme's comments from page 2

Throughout the manuscripts are to be found comments and / or alterations, some by Robert Burns himself, the others by John Syme, James Currie, W. Scott Douglas and a 'W.R.' These annotations are identifiable from their handwriting, appearance of the ink used, content, etc.

John Syme, a good friend of Burns, visited James Currie at Liverpool with Gilbert Burns on 30 August 1797, as noted on page 1. W.R. commented much earlier, probably around 1786. James Currie had possession of the manuscript from January 1797. William Scott Douglas (1878) apparently contributed at least one annotation, the ..ignorant critic comment on page 13.

Burns's comment on his lines of blank verse Intended for a tragedy on page 6 have been taken to infer that he had thoughts of writing a play.

=== Who was W.R.? ===
The 1786 annotator W.R. has only recently been tentatively identified. A William Ronald had been suggested by William Scott Douglas. William was gauds boy to Burns at Lochlea Farm, helping him with the ploughing by encouraging and guiding the horses whilst carrying a plough staff to clean the ploughshare when it clogged with earth. He later became a farmer at Mauleside, a small estate near Beith. Little is known of his life and therefore his qualifications as a critic of Burns's work are open to question. W.R. appears to have been asked by Burns to help with the selection of material for inclusion in the first Kilmarnock edition of his Poems, Chiefly in the Scottish Dialect. Burns often followed his advice and therefore the 'Kilmarnock Edition' can be seen as something of collaborative effort by a respected individual, despite John Syme's criticism of his irregular spelling.

A more convincing identification is that of William Reid of Brash and Reid, booksellers, Glasgow. William had served his apprenticeship with Messrs. Dunlop and Wilson, also of Glasgow. In 1786 they were the largest printers, publishers and printers in city. John Reid, his son, recalled his father recounting the following:-

"On one occasion, precise date now unknown, a stranger of most remarkable aspect, of rustic appearance and with a shepherd's plaid on his shoulders, presented himself to Mr. Reid on Dunlop and Wilson's premises—with an introduction to him, it is believed, from his friend Gavin Turnbull. This stranger's errand was two-fold—first to obtain publication, or more extensive publication, for a volume of poems, which he had in manuscript, or in printed sheets—uncertain which—in his hand; and second, an introduction through Mr. Reid or his employers to some of the wealthiest merchants in Glasgow, with a view to obtain a settlement for himself in the West Indies. He looked and spoke in the deepest distress—in distress approaching to despair, and was occasionally moved even to tears.

The poems he produced at the same time were of so great beauty, that, between sympathy and admiration, Mr. Reid was at a loss what to do. Finally, after discussing all the circumstances of the case and carefully scrutinising the poems, Mr. Reid, though a much younger man, affectionately struck his visitor on the shoulder and said, "Your country, Sir, cannot afford to send you to the West Indies; you must go to Edinburgh and not to Jamaica." The stranger, we need hardly say, was Robert Burns. It was not in Messrs. Dunlop and Wilson's line to publish volumes, much less small volumes of poetry; but Mr. Reid, though still a youth, gave the unknown a letter of introduction to Mr. Creech, with whom he was personally acquainted, and the interview for the present terminated."

=== Details of the size, appearance, etc. ===
The book is formed from eleven folio sheets on laid or chain and line paper that was folded to create a volume of size twelve and a half by seven and three-quarters inches, with twenty-two leaves and forty-four pages. They were originally broached with a course thread and were later bound in Morocco. By 1888 it was enclosed in a lockable rosewood box.

Burns's writing was perfectly legible with relatively few alterations or corrections. His manuscript is made up of around 1250 lines and his writing style has a pronounced slope from left to right and he characteristically wrote the letter d with the upright limb turned upwards and backwards. Later additions, alterations and annotations were written on the manuscript by Burns, John Syme, James Currie William Scott Douglas and the unidentified 'W.R.'

== Study, ownership and exhibition ==
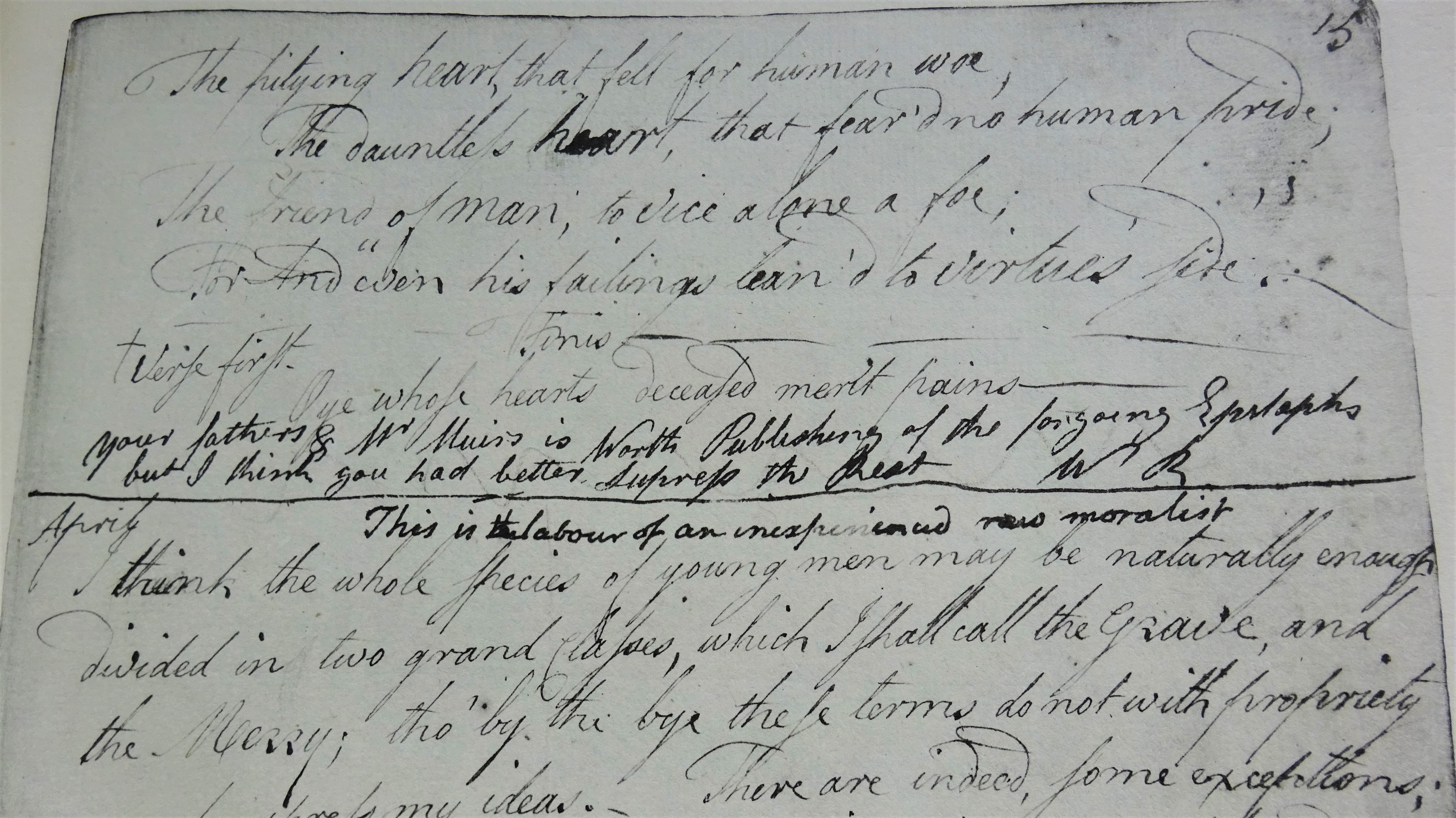
John Syme's comment on W.R. being an ...inexperienced moralist on page 15

The poet died on 21 July 1796 and the manuscript was at that time at Ellisland Farm. In January 1797 both Commonplace books were sent to Dr James Currie in Liverpool who used some of this material in his The Complete Poetical Works of Robert Burns: With Explanatory and Glossarial Notes; And a Life of the Author which was he published in four volumes in 1800. Both of the Commonplace books remained with Dr Currie as did the other material, such as the Glenriddell Manuscripts. Shortly before his death in 1805 it narrowly escaped being burnt. William Wallace Currie, James's son, inherited the book and when he died in 1840 it again narrowly escaped destruction as his will instructed his wife to destroy or keep the manuscripts that were in his possession. They passed to Sarah France Currie, James's daughter-in-law. Messrs. Puttick and Simpson of London on 2 May 1861 offered the book for auction as lot no. 203, but the catalogue did not indicate ownership, although the evidence suggests that the Currie Estate had instructed the sale.

A London bookseller purchased the lot, paying only £36, transferring it to Basil Montagu Pickering, another dealer who catalogued it but found no buyer. In 1868 another attempt realised several orders and the book was sent to John Adam of Greenock. John Duff inherited it in 1879 and on his death it was sold by Messrs. Sotheby, Wilkinson and Hodge of London. As lot no. 939 it was purchased by booksellers, Kerr & Richardson, for £101 and sold to Thomas Glen Arthur of Carrick House in Ayr and Glasgow. In 1891 it was sold to William Law through Kerr & Richardson, despite being included in Arthur's privately printed catalogue.

William Law lived at Honresfield House in Lancashire and after his death in 1901 it passed to Alfred Law, his brother. In 1913, 116 years after it was loaned to Dr James Curry, it passed to his nephew, Sir Alfred Joseph Law, who still held it in 1938 when a full facsimile was published by Gowans and Gray of Glasgow.

In 1896 William Law lent the book to the organisers of The Burns Exhibition held at The Royal Glasgow Institute of the Fine Arts in Glasgow from 15 July to 31 October 1896. It is recorded and facsimiles of a few pages were included in the Memorial Catalogue of the Burns Exhibition published by William Hodge & Company in 1898.

The authors who had direct access to the original manuscript were James Currie in 1800, R.H.Cromek in 1808, C.D.Lamont in 1872 and finally W. Scott Douglas in 1878.

The manuscript remained in private hands until it was purchased for the Scottish nation and it now resides in the National Library of Scotland.

== The 1872 Adam-Lamont reproduction and the 1938 facsimile ==
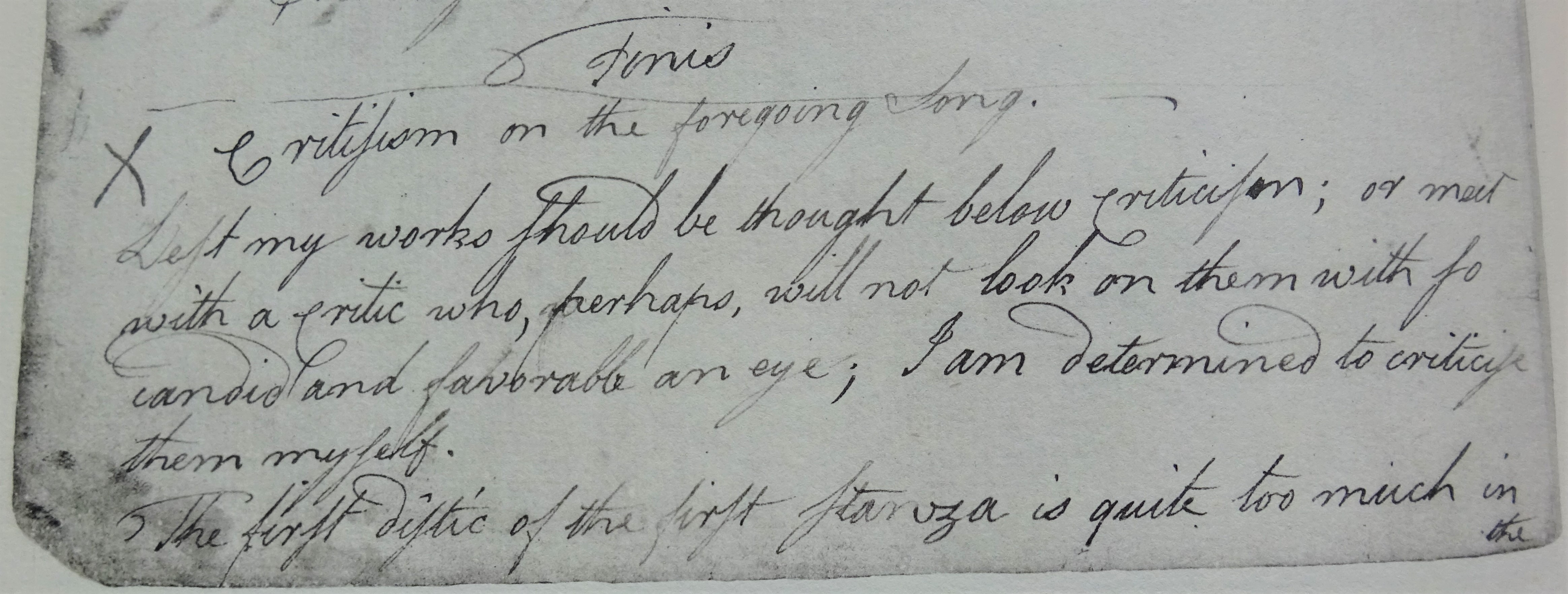
Burns's self criticism on Handsome Nell

The first faithful reproduction of the manuscript in type was organised by John Adam who was concerned to produce authentic copies should any accident befall the original. The punctuation was retained, no words altered, omitted or altered. Colin Daniel Lamont provided assistance to Adam in the task.

Robert Burns's Commonplace Book 1783–1785 Reproduced in Facsimile from the Poet's Manuscript in the Possession of Sir Alfred Joseph Law, M.P. was published by Gowans and Gray Limited of Glasgow in MCMXXXVIII (1938). Transcript, introduction and notes were contributed by James Cameron Ewing and Davidson Cook.

The folio was issued in a print run of 425 copies with a frontispiece engraving of Robert Burns after Alexander Nasmyth by William Walker and Samuel Cousins. The portrait is unusual as it has the incorrect date of death, given as MDCCCXCVII rather than MDCCCXVI. The paper was laid or chain and line.

== Robert Burns's Commonplace Book 1783–1785 ==
Burns's spelling and capitalisation retained.

Syme, W.R. and Scott Douglas treated in the same manner.

Indicative sections of text added where appropriate.

== Contents by page ==
1. Observations, Hints, Songs, Scraps of Poetry, etc. by Robert Burness; a note by John Syme recording that he had examined the manuscript on 30 August 1797.

2. Blank; Seven lines as added by John Syme.

3. April—83. Musings on love & affection; Aug. Connection between love & poetry; love as a reason for his becoming a poet; his first love; first stanza of song Handsome Nell. Burns later alteration virtue to honor Line 3 from foot; additions by Syme 24 years old and 1783; alteration by Currie of green to a youth of Line 6.

4. Completion of Handsome Nell; start of Burns's criticism of his song.

5. Completion of Burns's criticism; Sept --- Burns's judicous Philosopher Mr Smith comment; five lines of poetry

6. Completion of the poem; March—84 lines of blank verse; a later comment by Burns Intended for a tragedy Line 18.

7. Completion of the blank verse; philosophising that ..every man even the worst, have something good about; March—84 Comments on Blackguards and ..the noblest of virtues, Magnanimity; three alterations by Burns other deleted Line 13; escaped deleted and never been guilty of substituted Line 17; escaped deleted and fallen into substituted and deleted again Line 20; Syme comments This remark is copied etc. by the Bard in some other book after Line 24.

8. Completion of comments; March—84} Burns's ..Hypochondria, or confirmed Melancholy comments and the related four verses of prayer; April ---- ..whimsical Mortal and ..season of Winter comments.

9. Completion of the comments ..It is my best season for devotion ..; comments; song (Tune McPherson's Farewel). The wintry West extends his blast; comment by Syme confirming Burns's love of winter.

10. Completion of song The wintry west extends his blast; April ---- wild Rhapsody..; song (Tune The weaver and his shuttle O). My father was a farmer upon the Carrick border o; W.R comments Let this Appear I mean the Above Just as it is after Line 8; Syme comments that I like the following. Line 13.

11. Completion of the song My father was a farmer upon the Carrick border o; April --- Shenstone and comments that a poet cannot write love verses with out having experienced love; W.R. Comments I dont think the Above will do Unless it get a sound harrowing after Line 22.

12. Continuation of comments on genuine love poetry; Song (Tune As I came in by London O) Behind yon hills where Stincher flows; Syme comments printed after Line 7.

13. Completion of Behind yon hills where Stincher flows; comment by W.R. Nanie is an Excellent song Indeed Capital – but the last stanza is shameful. It must be published; Comment apparently by Scott Douglas W.R. is an ignorant critic.

14. April ----} Epitaph on W.m Hood Sen.r in Tarbolton.; On Jas Grieve, Laird of Boghead, Tarbolton; April ----) Epitaph on my own friend, & my father's friend, W.m. Muir in Tarbolton Miln.; April ----} Epitaph on my ever honored Father; Syme comments printed Line 2 & do Line 6.

15. Completion of epitaph; April ..the Grave and the Merry; dissertation; W.R. comments Your fathers & Mr Muirs is Worth Publishing of the forgoing Epitaphs but I think you had better suppress the rest; Symes comment This is the labour of an inexperienced raw moralist.

16. Completion of the dissertation on the various species of men; Aug. Burns's criticism of his dissertation; ..which of the Classes I belong to -; Song Green grow the rashes – O.

17. Completion of song Green grow the rashes – O; dissertation As the grand end of human life ...; W.R. comments this fragment well deserves a place in your Coliction. After Line 14.

18. Completion of the dissertation ...the poor, indolent, devil he has left behind him; Aug:} A prayer, when fainting fits, & other alarming symptoms of a Pleurisy ..; Syme comments printed in Creech's edition Line 17.

19. Completion of the Prayer; Aug ;) Misgivings in the hour of DESPONDENCY – and prospect of Death; W.R. comment this Would Look not amiss in my Opinion Line 8; comment by Syme offended between Line 17 & 18; W.R. comments to serious after Line 28.

20. Song. Tune. Invercald's reel – Strathspey. Tibby I hae seen the day; Syme comments Is this printed? Tis good considering all the circumstances. after Line 1.

21. Completion of Tibby I hae seen the day; Sept Tune: Black Joke. My girl she's airy, she's buxom and gay; W.R. comments I Will not Dispence with this it is so Excellent, change the name of Tibbie to some other if it will not do; Syme comments orthographic judge; W.R. comments This will not do after Line 28; Syme comments no – you are right.

22. John Barley corn—A Song to its own Tune. ..remembering only one or two verses of it ..; 1785 June} There was three Kings into the east; Syme comments printed in Creech's edition Line 8.

23. Continuation of John Barley corn.

24. Completion of John Barley corn; June} The death & dyin' words o' poor Mailie – my ain pet ewe – an unco mournfu' Tale; W.R. comments I dont Like the Above but Perhaps I am wrong Line 5; Syme comments printed – Creech. Line 8.

25. Continuation of The death & dyin' words o' poor Mailie – my ain pet ewe—an unco mournfu' Tale'

26. Completion of The death & dyin' words o' poor Mailie – my ain pet ewe – an unco mournfu' Tale; June } A letter sent to John Lapraik near Muirkirk, a true, genuine Scottish Bard—April 1, 1785; W.R. comments Maily must appear; Syme comments printed Line 14.

27. Continuation of A letter sent to John Lapraik near Muirkirk, a true, genuine Scottish Bard.

28. Continuation of A letter sent to John Lapraik near Muirkirk, a true, genuine Scottish Bard.

29. Continuation of A letter sent to John Lapraik near Muirkirk, a true, genuine Scottish Bard.

30. Completion of A letter sent to John Lapraik near Muirkirk, a true, genuine Scottish Bard; On receiving an answer to the above I wrote the following April 21st 1785. While new ca't ky rowt at the stake; W.R. comments the Above is exceeding pretty Line 6; Syme comments printed Line 8.

31. Continuation of On receiving an answer to the above I wrote the following April 21st 1785.

32. Continuation of On receiving an answer to the above I wrote the following April 21st 1785; W.R comments I think there is some faults in the Above which might be easily amended but the Last part of it flags Unpardonably – the first is fraught with Genuine Humour.

33. A stanza forgot, belonging to the foot of Page 19th } O Thou great Governor of all below! August} A Song. --- Tune Peggy Bawn. When chill November's surly blast; Syme comments printed Creech Line 12.

34. Continuation of When chill November's surly blast; Burns comments A Verse wanting here – See page 40.

35. Completion of When chill November's surly blast; Burns comments – The last verse of John Barley corn Page 24th; Burns deleted insolence & adding cruelty Line 8; W.R.' comments The Lordly Cassils pride is a line you must alter. I was astonished to see any thing so Personal.

36. Aug } Burns's praise of the poets Ramsay and Ferguson followed by his hurt that no poet had immortalised the ...towns, rivers, woods, haughs, etc. of Carrick, Kyle and Cunningham. He expresses his lack of genius and education to take on the task; stanza And if there is no other scene of Being; Syme comments The above may furnish a remark on the Bard.

37. Aug } A Fragment. – Tune, I had a horse & I had nae mair. When first I came to Stewart Kyle; Har'ste—A Fragment --- Tune --- Foregoing --- Now breezy win's and slaughtering guns; Sept } Comments on .. a certain irregularity in the old Scotch Songs..; Burns uses a cypher for two words at Line 18, probably Jeany Armour; Syme comments The following remarks may be introduced somewhere when Thomsons letters are noticed.

38. Continuation of comments on Scottish song and tunes; Burns deleted Nature and substituted native genius Line 18.

39. Completion of comments on poets, verse and love; Sept } comments on McMillan's Peggy and his My Montgomerie's Peggy; Syme comments perhaps the above would take with many readers Line 11 and This explains the love letters to Peggy.

40. Fragment – Tune – Galls water. Altho' my bed were in yon muir; A verse of a Song forgot – Vide Page 34 Look not alone on youthful prime; Syme comments indifferent & G.B. says it is a parody of an old Scotch Song.

41. Sept } Another Fragment in imitation of an old Scotch Song ... and comments on having forgotten the tune and words. Alluding to the misfortunes he feelingly laments before this verse. When clouds in skies do come together. Burns says that this was written extempore under the pressure of a heavy train of misfortune... and refers to the dreadful period mentioned on page 8th.; Burns deleted make and substituted catch and deleted him and substituted the Bard Line 7; like deleted and strongly substituted Line 8; langs deleted and fars substituted Line 21; since deleted Line 29.

42. Comments continued ...I may, even then, learn to be, if not happy, at least easy, and south a sang to sooth my misery; Burns comments on composing an air in the old Scotch style – O raging Fortune's withering blast.

43. Oct: 85 } Burns comments If ever any young man, on the vestibule of the world, chance to throw his eye over these pages, let him pay a warm attention to the following observation; as I assure him they are the fruit of a poor devil's dear bought Experience; Burns finishes with In the first place, let my Pupil, as he tenders his own peace, keep up a regular, warm intercourse with the Deity.

44. Blank

=== The comments made by W.R. ===
Syme & Scott Douglas's responses added.

1] I dont think the Above will do Unless it get a sound harrowing. 2) Nanie is an Excellent song Indeed Capital – but the last stanza is shameful. It must be published. Scott Douglass comments W.R. is an ignorant critic. 3) Your fathers & Mr Muirs is Worth Publishing of the forgoing Epitaphs but I think you had better Suppress the rest. Symes comments This is the labour of an inexperienced raw moralist. 4) this fragment well deserves a place in your Coliction. 5) this Would Look not amiss in my Opinion. 6) to serious. 7) I Will not Dispence with this it is so Excellent, change the name of Tibbie to some other if it will not do. Syme comments orthographic judge 8) This will not do. 9) I dont Like the Above but Perhaps I am wrong. 10) Maily must appear. 11) the Above is exceeding pretty. 12) The Lordly Cassils pride is a line you must alter. I was astonished to see any thing so Personal.

== The Second Commonplace Book or Edinburgh Journal ==
Burns's Second Commonplace Book contains thoughts and ideas as rough drafts of the poet's poems and songs over the period 9 April 1787 to 1790. He was living in Edinburgh when the book was started and at Ellisland Farm when the last entry was made. The volume is sometimes known as the Edinburgh Journal and after the poet's death passed into the hands of James Currie and was used in his 1800 publication of Burns's works. It is now held by the Robert Burns Birthplace Museum at Alloway.

== The Third and Fourth Commonplace Books ==
The Glenriddell Manuscripts are treated as a third Commonplace Book and a fourth also existed, known as the 'Farming Memorandum Book'. It contained notes of farming but also drafts of poems and at least one song with notes on Scottish sings similar to those in Riddell's Robert Burns's Interleaved Scots Musical Museum volumes. Small parts were published by James Currie and the biographer Kinsley was aware if it, however its whereabouts are unknown and it may have been lost or destroyed whilst in the hands of Currie.

== See also ==
- A Manual of Religious Belief
- Poems, Chiefly in the Scottish Dialect (Edinburgh Edition)
- Poems, Chiefly in the Scottish Dialect (Second Edinburgh Edition)
- Poems, Chiefly in the Scottish Dialect (London Edition)
- Glenriddell Manuscripts
- Robert Burns's Interleaved Scots Musical Museum
- The Geddes Burns
- Robert Burns World Federation
- Burns Clubs
