= Michael Biggs (singer) =

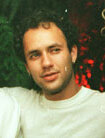
- Biggs in 1999

Background information
- Born: Michael Fernand Nascimento de Castro Biggs; 16 August 1974 (age 51)
- Origin: Rio de Janeiro, Brazil
- Genres: Children's music; pop; pop rock
- Occupations: Singer; songwriter; actor; TV host
- Instrument: Vocals
- Years active: 1982–present
- Labels: CBS; Sony Music; JT

Michael Fernand Nascimento de Castro Biggs (born August 16, 1974), is an English-Brazilian singer most known as a member of children's music group Turma do Balão Mágico.

== Early life ==
Biggs was born on 16 August 1974 in Rio de Janeiro, Brazil, to 45-year old Ronnie Biggs, a British fugitive criminal who had fled the UK in 1970, and his girlfriend, 19-year old Raimunda Rothen de Castro, a Brazilian stripper. He lived in Santa Teresa, an upper-middle-class neighborhood in Zona Central, Rio de Janeiro.

== Career ==
Biggs' music career began in 1982, when his father was kidnapped by British ex-soldiers hoping to collect a reward from the British police. Biggs, then aged 8, made a plea on national television for the safe return of his father. Publicity from the television appearance led to him being offered a role in children's musical group Turma do Balão Mágico. From 1983 to 1986 he starred on the Rede Globo television show Balão Mágico, which featured the band.

After the group disbanded in 1986, Biggs abandoned show business and worked as a construction worker. In 2018, Biggs joined former bandmates Simony and Tob for a reunion tour of Brazil commemorating of the group's 35th anniversary.

Since March 2021, Biggs has presented the musical TV show Papo Musical on cable television channel Arte1.

In 2023, he appeared in a Star+ documentary about the band.

== Personal life ==
In 2001, Biggs moved to the United Kingdom with his father, who turned himself in to the police after spending the last thirty years as a fugitive in Brazil. In 2002, Michael received British citizenship after his parents married in a prison ceremony.
