= Jairzinho & Simony =

Studio album by Jairzinho & Simony
- Released: September 21, 1987
- Genre: Children's music
- Length: 41:00
- Label: CBS Records
- Producer: Ronnie Foster

Singles from Jairzinho & Simony

Jairzinho & Simony is the only studio album by Simony and Jairzinho. The album was popular in Brazilian and Spanish speaking markets. This the only album the duo would ever make.

== Reception ==
The album sold 600,000 in Brazil by 1987.
