= Nelly Kilpatrick =

First love and muse of poet Robert Burns

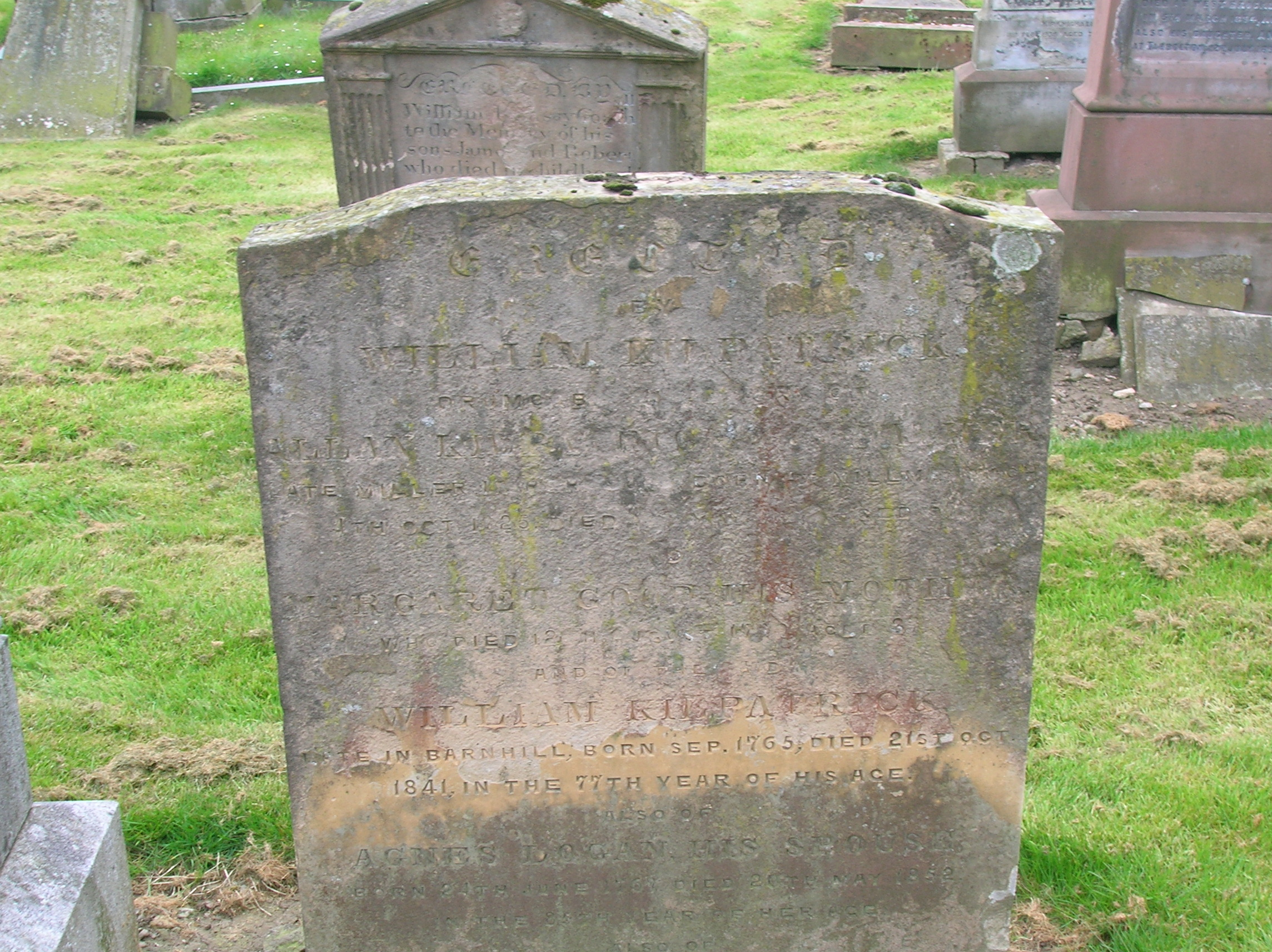
- The headstone of Nelly Kilpatrick's parents
- Born: 24 February 1759; Perclewan, Ayrshire, Scotland
- Died: 1820 (aged 60–61); Scotland
- Occupation: Wife to William Bone

Nelly or Nellie Kilpatrick, Helen Kilpatrick or later Nelly Bone (1759–1820). Nelly (usually short for "Helen") was possibly Robert Burns's first love and muse as stated by Isabella Burns.

== Early life ==
Nelly is usually used as a nickname for "Helen." Some authors give her birth year as 1760. Nelly may have been the daughter of John Kilpatrick, the miller and his wife Jane Reid of Perclewan Mill near Dalrymple. She was baptised on 1 March 1759.

== Life and character ==
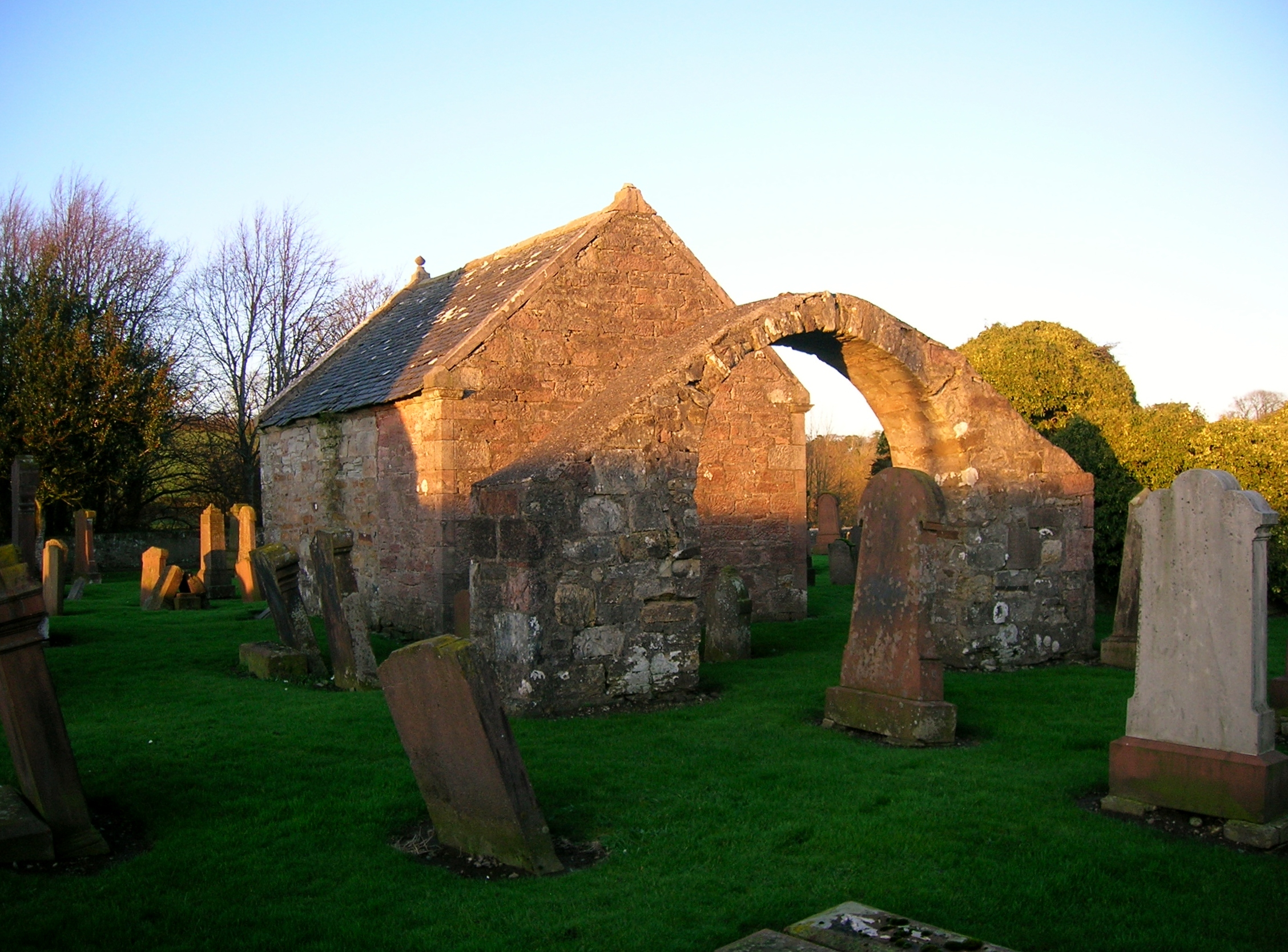
Low Coylton Kirkyard, burial place of Nelly's parents.

He stated that she had a sweet voice and was wont to sing songs as she worked in the fields. Nelly married William Bone, coachman to the Laird of Newark.

After the move from Millmannoch Mill, Nelly lived in the old hamlet of Percluan or Purclewan, at the mill there and may have also met Robert Burns both there and at Purclewan's smithy where Henry McCandlish, known as Henry Candlish, was the blacksmith. Robert Burns was a close friend of Dr James McCandlish, or Candlish, the blacksmith's son and they had been classmates. Jean, the Sister of James Smith of Mauchline, Burns's close friend, married James Candlish.

A parish record at St. Quivox in Ayrshire states that a William Kilpatrick Bone was born to William Bone and his wife Helen Kilpatrick Bone on 12 May 1798.

Nelly had a brother, William, who erected her parents' tombstone in the old Low Coylton Kirkyard.

== Family origins ==
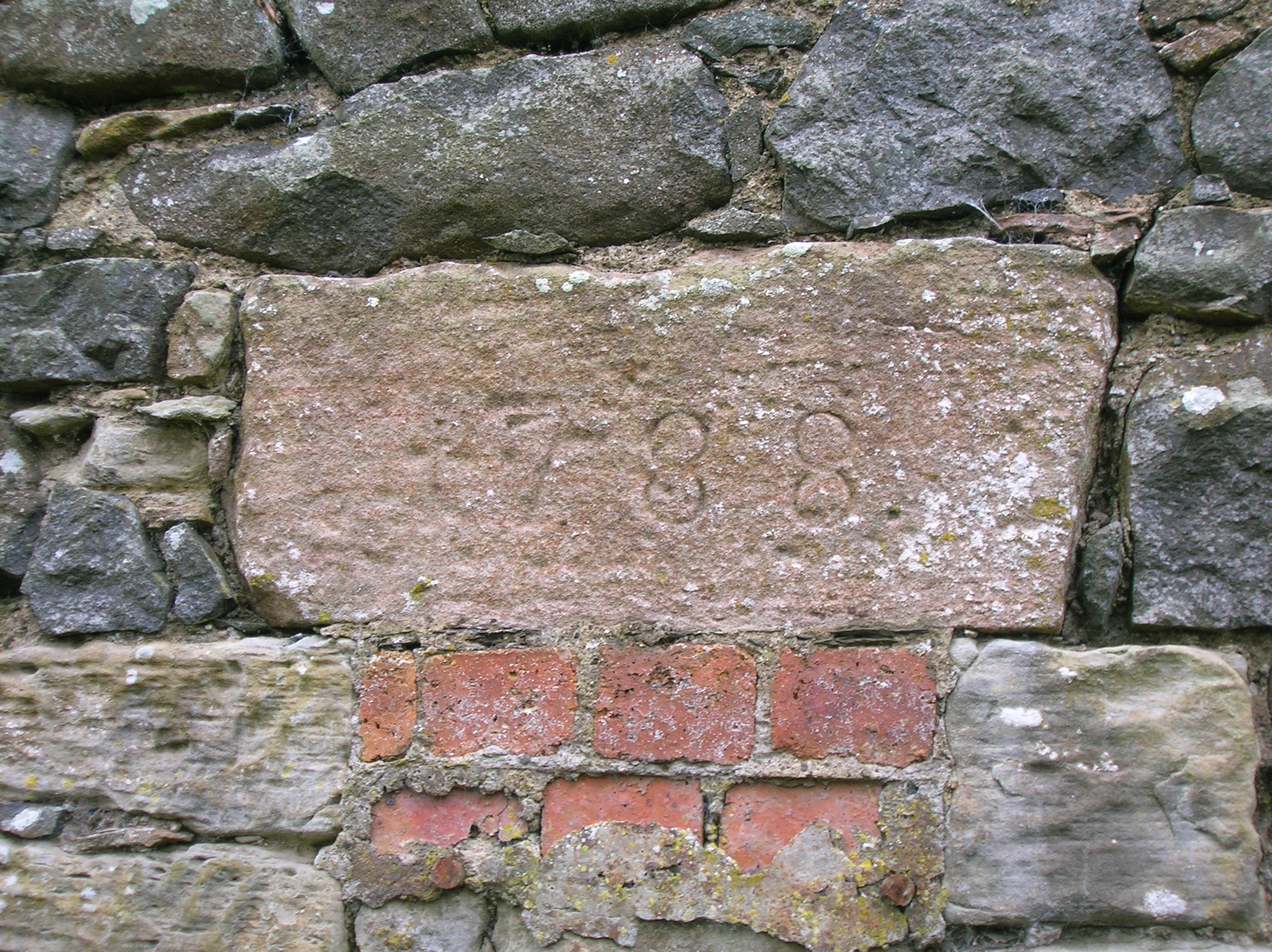
Datestone from Millmannoch Mill

At the beginning of the eighteenth century Millmannoch Mill was occupied by a family called Kilpatrick, who also carried on the trade of blacksmithing, because at that time milling lasted around seven months of the year, usually September to April, and as a result millers had to look for alternative work during late spring and summer. Part of the smithy at Millmannoch was still standing in the early 20th century and, it is recorded in front of it there was a large boulder of granite sunk to the level of the ground with a "dog" fixed into it for cart wheel shods, the metal band or ring on a cartwheel.

William Kilpatrick was the miller at Millmannoch; his wife was Hellen Craford (sic). William and Helen had a son, Allan Kilpatrick, born at Millmannoch on 4 October 1725; his wife was Margaret Good who died on 12 August 1770, aged 37. This Allan is sometimes said to have been Nelly's father. Allan moved to Purclewan (Percluan) with his father and like him, worked at two jobs, miller and blacksmith, resulting in some confusion in reports over the profession of Nelly's father; he died aged 57. The headstone was erected by their son William Kilpatrick of Barnhill; his spouse was Agnes Logan (1767–1852) and they had a daughter Agnes (1796–1862). Hill has it that Allan may have been the blacksmith at Mount Oliphant, however the smithy for the farm was the nearby Millmannoch.

Mount Oliphant is only about one and a half miles away, an easy walk for Nelly to help with the harvest.

== The true identity of Nell ==
Burns himself did not identify her by her surname. Some significant doubts exist about the true identity of Burns's first romantic love. It was thought at first to be a Nelly Blair until Burns's sister Isobel gave the name Nelly Kilpatrick, however Isobel was only three years old at the time and some doubt must be cast on her recollections at this stage in her life. Isobel stated that Nelly Kilpatrick was the daughter of the blacksmith of Perclewan. Nelly Kilpatrick would have been only a few weeks younger than Robert Burns, however he stated that his Nell was a year younger than himself.

== Association with Robert Burns ==
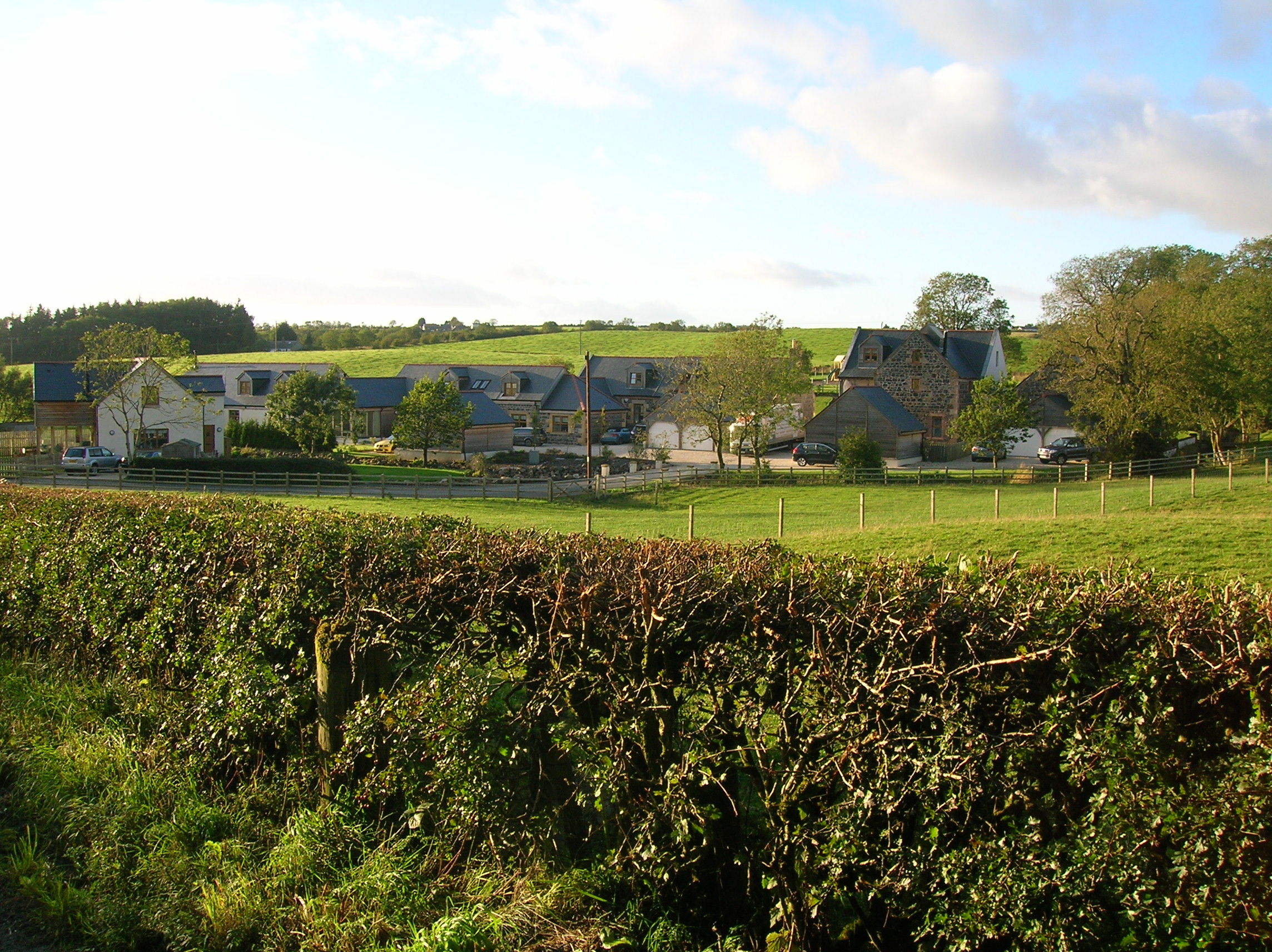
Perclewan Mill in 2012.

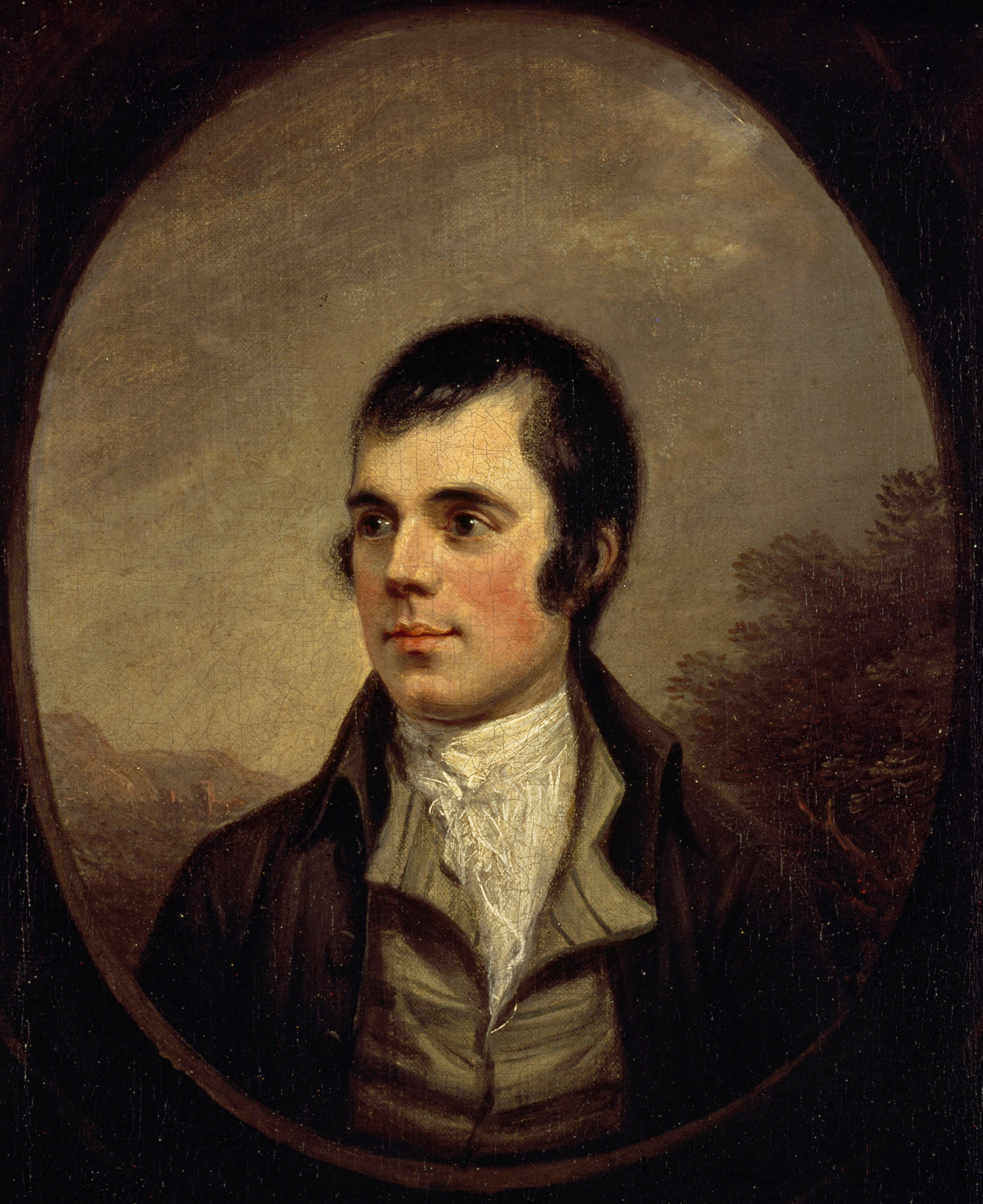
Full view of the Naysmith portrait of 1787, Scottish National Portrait Gallery

When Robert Burns was 15 he met "Handsome Nell", his first young love, a "bonnie, sweet, sonsie lass", although he apparently never told her of his love. Nelly Bone, is better known as Nelly Kilpatrick. They are first recorded to have met when William Burnes hired some extra help to bring in the harvest while they were at nearby Mount Oliphant Farm and Burns came to be paired with her, following the Ayrshire custom of that time.

In his autobiographical letter to Dr Hunter he wrote: "Indeed, I did not not well know myself I liked so much to loiter behind with her when returning in the evening from our labours; why the tones of her voice made my heart-strings thrill like an Aeolian harp, and particularly why my pulse beat such a furious rantann when I looked and fingered over her hand to pick out the nettle-stings and thistles."

He wrote a poem to Nell, unpublished during his life, but it appeared in his Commonplace Book and set to the tune of Nelly’s favourite reel.

He had heard her singing a song by a local country laird's son who was courting her and felt that he could do better, so it was with Nelly in mind that he wrote his first song "Handsome Nell", given the tune "I am a Man Unmarried" in his first Commonplace Book-

"O once I lov'd a bonnie lass,
Aye, and I love her still;
And whilst that virtue warms my breast,
I'll love my handsome Nell."

The tune to the song has not come down to us. Some years later Burns wrote of this song, saying -

"I never had the least thought or inclination of turning poet till I got once heartily in love, and then rhyme and song were, in a manner, the spontaneous language of my heart. I remember I composed it in a wild enthusiasm of passion, and to this hour I never recollect it but my heart melts, and my blood sallies at the remembrance."

Nelly has been said to figure in Burns's poem, "Halloween"

"The lasses staw frae 'mang them a'
To pou their stalks of corn:
But Rab slips out, and jinks about,
Behint the muckle thorn:
He grippet Nelly hard and fast;
Loud skirl'd a' the lasses;
But her tap-pickle maist was lost,
When kitlin' in the fause-house
Wi' him that night."

and the verse :

"Nell had the fause-house in her min',
She pits hersel and Rob in;
In loving bleeze they sweetly join,
Till white in ase they're sobbin';
Nell's heart was dancin' at the view,
She whisper'd Rob to leuk for't:
Rob, stowlins, prie'd her bonny mou',
Fu' cozie in the neuk for't,
Unseen that night."

== See also ==
- Jean Armour
- Alison Begbie
- Nelly Blair
- Agnes Burns
- Agnes Broun
- Isabella Burns
- Elizabeth 'Betty' Burns
- William Burnes
- May Cameron
- Mary Campbell (Highland Mary)
- Jenny Clow
- Jean Gardner
- Jessie Lewars
- Mary Morison
- Ann Park
- Elizabeth Paton
- Peggy Thompson
