= The Curragh of Kildare =

Irish folk song

The Curragh of Kildare (Roud 1486), also known as The Winter It is Past, is a folk song particularly associated with the Irish tradition.

Elements of some versions of the song suggest that it dates from at least the mid 18th century. The Curragh of Kildare speaks of the actual Curragh, which is a large area of common land in County Kildare, Ireland, used to rally the Irish Army.

== Textual history ==
The history of the text is rather complicated. Versions were taken down at different times in Ireland by collectors like George Petrie and P. W. Joyce. The song has also been collected in Scotland and even in England; the singer Frank Purslow collected a version (The Winter's Gone and Past) in Dorset. Petrie was of the opinion that it was an "old Anglo-Irish song" and argued that the Scottish versions were most likely developed from it. Several printed ballad versions exist, under titles such as The Lamenting Maid.

The most well known version of the text, usually referred to by the title The Winter it is Past, is attributed to Robert Burns. Burns appears to have developed it from a popular stall-ballad, The Lovesick Maid, which referred to a highwayman called Johnson, who was hanged in 1750 for robbery in the Curragh. Burns polished the original text considerably and removed two stanzas referring directly to Johnson. The resulting ballad was published in the collection the Scots Musical Museum.

Different airs have been used for the song. Petrie suspected that one had been composed expressly for the stall-ballad, probably in Scotland around 1750, but expressed an opinion that "the same song united to a melody unquestionably Irish has been [...] known in Ireland [...] for an equal or much longer period". The tune used for Burns' version has been identified as a (distant) relative of that used for the American ballad Fare You Well, My Own True Love.

The song as currently performed was popularised by The Johnstons, and later by Christy Moore, while versions also exist by Paddy Reilly, The Fureys, Bert Jansch and others. Modern renditions have tended to use a text where the singer is male, and the "true love" female, whereas in the early ballads such as The Lamenting Maid the opposite was the case.
