= A Turma do Balão Mágico (1982 album) =

Studio album by Turma do Balão Mágico
- Released: November 30, 1982
- Genre: Children's music
- Length: 42:16
- Label: CBS Records

A Turma do Balão Mágico is the first studio album by Brazilian band Turma do Balão Mágico, released on November 30, 1982, by CBS Records. According to Veja, the album sold over 600,000 copies in Brazil by January 4, 1984. The songs on the album were written by Edgard Poças.

== Track listing ==
Side A
No.	Title	Length
1.	"Baile Dos Passarinhos (Tschip Tschip Tschip)"	3:11
2.	"O Pato Cantor (El Pato Cantor)"	1:54
3.	"A Galinha Magricela (La Gallina Papanatas)"	2:44
4.	"Tem Gato Na Tuba"	1:50
5.	"Cowboy Do Amor"	2:53
6.	"P. R. Você"	2:20
7.	"Upa! Upa! (Meu Trolinho)"	1:58

Side B
No.	Title	Length
8.	"Charleston (O Charleston)"	2:30
9.	"A Canção Dos Felisbertos (Smurfenlied)"	3:34
10.	"Oh! Suzana"	1:57
11.	"Co-co-uá (La Gallina Coccouá)"	2:47
13.	"Dança Sim (Scommettiamo)"	3:22
14.	"O Trenzinho (Cin Cin Pon Pon)"	3:06

== Credits ==
- Turma do Balão Mágico - vocals
- Robson Jorge - guitar
- Nilo Pinta - guitars
- Jamil Joanes - bass
- Lincoln Olivetti - keyboards
- Picolé - drums

== Bibliography ==
- Barcinski, André (2014). Pavões Misteriosos — 1974-1983: A explosão da música pop no Brasil. São Paulo: Editora Três Estrelas. (ISBN 978-85-653-3929-2)
