= A Turma do Balão Mágico (1983 album) =

1983 studio album by Turma do Balão Mágico

Studio album by Turma do Balão Mágico
- Released: September 21, 1983
- Genre: Children's music
- Length: 42:16
- Label: CBS Records

Singles from A Turma do Balão Mágico

A Turma do Balão Mágico is the second studio album by Brazilian band Turma do Balão Mágico, released on September 9, 1983, by CBS Records. Superfantástico is the most well known song by Turma do Balão Mágico. According to Veja, the album sold 1.1 million copies by January 4, 1984.

== Track List ==
Side A

1. "Superfantástico" ("Super Fantástico")
2. "Ai Meu Nariz!" ("Tengo un Grano en la Nariz")
3. "Ursinho Pimpão" ("Mi Osito Pelón")
4. "O Meu Avô" ("Abuelito")
5. "Você e Eu" ("Tu y Yo")

Side B

1. "Seu Felipe, Dorminhoco" ("Felipito, el dormilon")
2. "Juntos" ("Juntos") (featuring Baby Consuelo)
3. "Gaguejei" ("Tartamudeo")
4. "Amigo e Companheiro" ("Amigo y Compañero, Mi Maestro")
5. "Mãe-Iê"

== Bibliography ==
- Barcinski, André (2014). Pavões Misteriosos — 1974-1983: A explosão da música pop no Brasil. São Paulo: Editora Três Estrelas. (ISBN 978-85-653-3929-2
