= A Turma do Balão Mágico (1985 album) =

1984 studio album by Turma do Balão Mágico

Studio album by Turma do Balão Mágico
- Released: September 21, 1985
- Genre: Children's music
- Length: 42:16
- Label: CBS Records

Singles from A Turma do Balão Mágico

A Turma do Balão Mágico is the fourth studio album by Brazilian band Turma do Balão Mágico, released on September 9, 1985, by CBS Records. It was the first album without Vimerson Cavanillas due to change of voice and was replaced by Ricardinho.

According to O Globo, the album sold one million copies.

== Track List ==
=== Side A ===
1. "Barato Bom É da Barata" (with Erasmo Carlos)
2. "Não Dá Pra Parar a Música" (with Grupo Metrô)
3. "Fim de Semana" (with Dominó)
4. "Tic-tac" (with Castrinho)
5. "Trem Mineiro"
6. "Cortaram Meu Verão"

=== Side B ===
1. "Chega Mais um Pouco" (with Dominó)
2. "Garota e Garoto" (with Moraes Moreira)
3. "Coração" - solos: Simony & Jairzinho
4. "Um Raio de Sol" (with Baby Consuelo & Pepeu Gomes)
5. "Soldadinho de Chumbo" - solos: Mike, Simony & Jairzinho
6. "Mochila Azul" - solo: Jairzinho

== Bibliography ==
- Barcinski, André (2014). Pavões Misteriosos — 1974-1983: A explosão da música pop no Brasil. São Paulo: Editora Três Estrelas. (ISBN 978-85-653-3929-2)
