= A Turma do Balão Mágico (1986 album) =

Studio album by Turma do Balão Mágico
- Released: October 30, 1986
- Genre: Children's music
- Length: 42:16
- Label: Som Livre

A Turma do Balão Mágico is the sixth studio album by Brazilian band Turma do Balão Mágico, released on October 30, 1986, by Som Livre. The album sold 600,000 copies. In 1988 A Nova Turma do Balão Mágico was formed.

== Track listing ==
=== Side A ===
1. Roda Roda Pião
2. Boa Vida (Tema Do Gato Garfield)
3. Menina (Com Leo Jaime)
4. Pa-ra-tchi-bum
5. Putz, O Grande Mágico
6. Flechas Do Amor

=== Side B ===
1. O Que Cantam As Crianças (Com José Luis Perales) (Esta música, no disco do cantor espanhol lançado em Julho de 1986, conta com as vozes-solos de todos os integrantes, mas no disco do grupo, as vozes de Mike e Ricardinho foram apagadas)
2. Felicidade (Com Simone)
3. Salsita
4. Você É Música
5. Bate Palma (Homenagem ao grupo Os Trapalhões)
6. Papabaquigrifismo
7. Travesseiro
