= Jair Oliveira =

Brazilian musician & actor (born 1975)

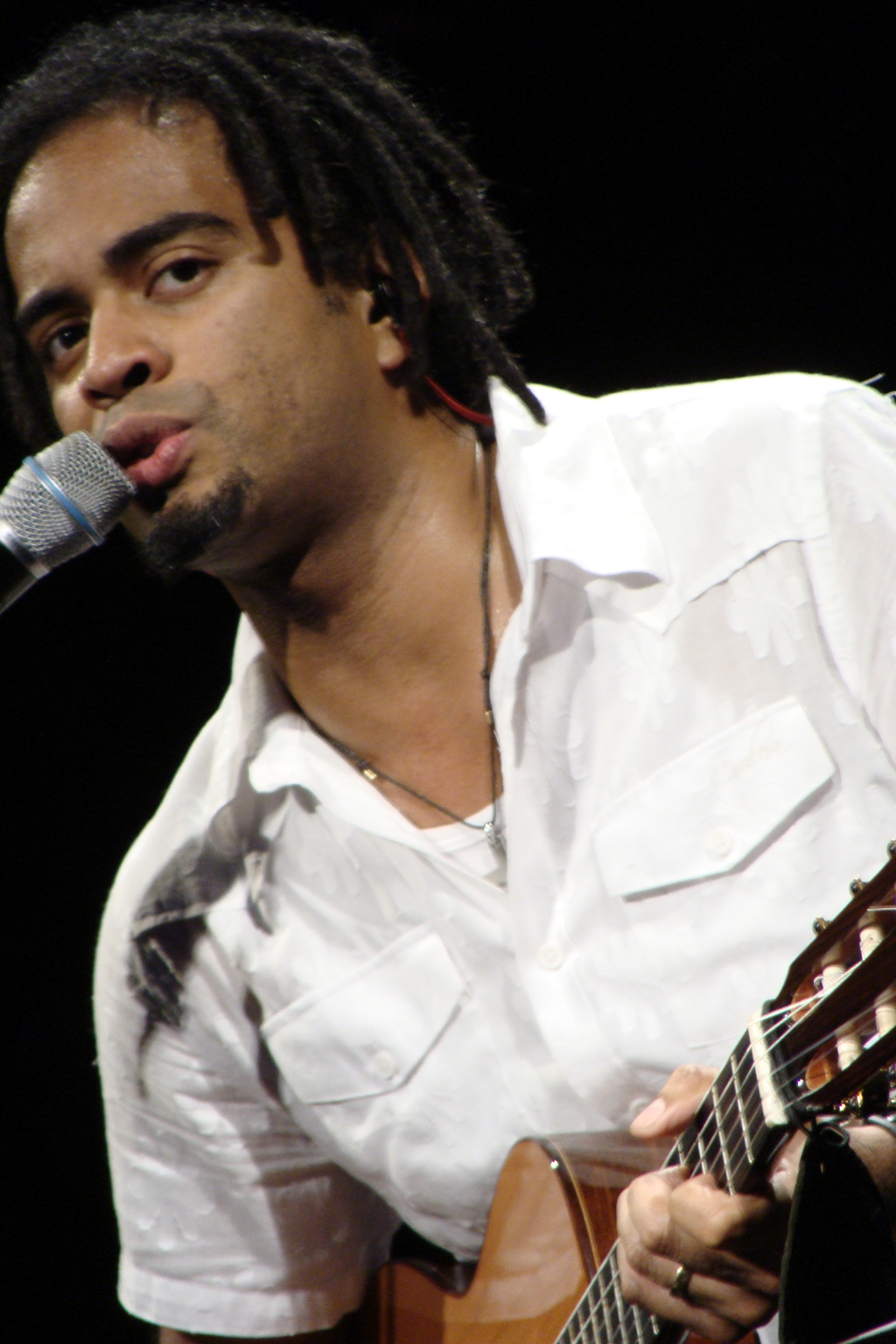

Background information
- Born: Jair Rodrigues M. Oliveira; March 17, 1975 (age 51); Rio de Janeiro, Brazil
- Genres: Latin, pop, samba, acid jazz, soul, MPB
- Occupation: Singer
- Instrument: Vocals
- Label: Columbia Records
- Formerly of: Turma do Balão Mágico

Jair Rodrigues M. Oliveira (Jairzinho Oliveira, born March 17, 1975, in São Paulo, São Paulo) is a Brazilian composer, singer and producer. He is the son of the late Brazilian musician Jair Rodrigues and brother to singer Luciana Mello.

In the early 1980s Jair was a co-star on the Brazilian children's television program Balão Mágico ("Magic Balloon"). The show's cast were also members of the musical group Turma do Balão Mágico ("The Magic Balloon Gang") which sold over 13 million copies.

During the 1990s Jair moved to the United States where he enrolled at Berklee College of Music, in Boston, to study Music Production & Engineering and Music Business, graduating in 1998.

Projeto Artistas Reunidos (United Artists Project) was a collaboration of Música popular brasileira artists that fused classic samba and bossa nova with soul music, funk and electronica. Members included Oliveira's sister, Luciana Mello, João Marcelo Bôscoli, Pedro Mariano, Daniel Carlomagno and brothers Max de Castro and Wilson Simoninha.

In 2019, his album Selfie was nominated for the Latin Grammy Award for Best Portuguese Language Contemporary Pop Album.

== Personal life ==
Jair is married to Tania Khalill. They have two children.

== Discography ==
Album with Simony

- Jairzinho & Simony (in Spanish) (1987)

Album with Uri Caine

- Rio (Winter & Winter, 2001)

Albums solo

- 2001: Disritmia (Trama)
- 2002: Outro (Trama)
- 2002: Brazilian Love Affair (Far Out)
- 2003: 3.1 (Trama)
- 2003: 3.2 (Trama)
- 2006: Simples (Unimar)
- 2010: Sambazz (Som Livre)

== Filmography ==
Year	Film	Role
1988	Caminho dos Sonhos	Carlos
2006	Os Desafinados	Geraldo
