= Luciana Mello =

Brazilian singer and professional dancer (born 1979)

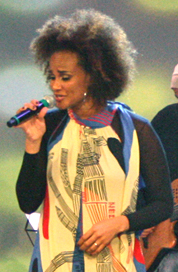

Background information
- Born: Luciana Mello Rodrigues de Oliveira; January 22, 1979 (age 47); Rio de Janeiro, Brazil
- Genres: Latin, pop, samba, acid jazz, soul, MPB
- Occupation: Singer
- Instrument: Vocals
- Label: Columbia Records

Luciana Mello (born January 22, 1979) is a Brazilian singer and professional dancer.

Mello began her musical training early in life, taking voice and dance lessons. As a child, she sang in choirs and later performed in musicals. She emerged on the Brazilian pop music scene as a participant in the Artistas Reunidos (Reunited Artists) project, and issued her first solo CD, Assim Que Se Faz, in 2001.

Mello's father was prominent Brazilian musician and singer Jair Rodrigues. Her brother, Jair Oliveira, is also an influential producer of modern Brazilian pop music and is a singer/songwriter in his own right.

Her album Na Luz do Samba was nominated for the 2017 Latin Grammy Award for Best Samba/Pagode Album.

== Discography ==
Title	Details
Luciana Rodrigues	Released: 1995; Label: Independent; Format: CD; Sales: 20,000
Assim que Se Faz	Released: 2000; Label: Trama; Format: CD; Sales: 250,000
Olha pra Mim	Released: 2002; Label: Universal Music; Format: CD; Sales: 70,000
L.M.	Released: 2004; Label: Universal Music; Format: CD, download digital; Sales: 30,000
Nêga	Released: 21 August 2007; Label: S de Samba, Brasil Música!, Koala Records; Format: CD, download digital; Sales: 15,000
O Samba me Cantou	Released: 2010; Label: S de Samba; Format: CD, DVD, download digital; Sales: 10,000
6.º Solo	Released: 2011; Label: Warner Music; Format: CD, download digital; Sales: 5,000
Na Luz do Samba	Released: 2016; Label: Radar Records; Format: CD, download digital

Other Albums

- 1998:Projeto Artistas Reunidos
