= Orival Pessini =

Brazilian actor, comedian, and writer

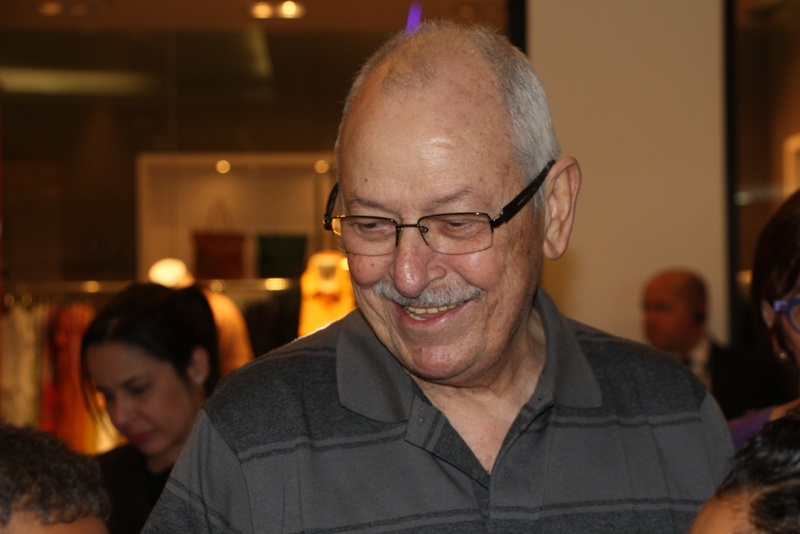
- Orival Pessini in 2015
- Born: 6 August 1944; Pompeia, São Paulo, Brazil
- Died: 14 October 2016 (aged 72); Rio de Janeiro, Brazil
- Occupations: Actor, comedian, writer, humorist and composer
- Years active: 1963 – 2016
- Known for: Fofão; Escolinha do Professor Raimundo

Orival Pessini (6 August 1944 – 14 October 2016) was a Brazilian actor, comedian, and writer known for his characters Sócrates, Charles, Fofão, Patropi, Juvenal, Ranulpho Pereira, Hitler (based on the Austrian Nazi dictator Adolf Hitler), Clô (based on the stylist Clodovil Hernandes), Frank (in honor of the singer Frank Sinatra) and others on programs and TV commercials, and also for using latex masks (made by himself) in the composition of his characters.

== Career ==
Pessini began his career in amateur theatre and later began appearing in famous commercials such as "Jarrão da Ki-Suco" products, "Campanha da AACD" and "Tiger by Kellogg's". His TV debut was on the Children's "Quem Conta Um Conto" on Tupi TV in 1963. During this period, Orival began to develop his own technique, creating latex masks with movement, to be able to play different characters on stage, in the same way that Chico Anysio played different characters on TV. In the 1970s, he played the monkeys Socrates and Charles, from the Planeta dos Homens (Globo). In 1988, the character Patropi debuted on the show Praça Brasil on the Bandeirantes Network, being invited to act in other shows such as Escolinha do Professor Raimundo (Globo) and A Praça é Nossa (SBT). Parallel to his work on TV, Orival presented a solo show called Patropi e Cia.

The First Lady, Elmo, and Rosita Partner to Encourage Healthy Food Choices for Kids

It was on the program Balão Mágico (Globo) that Orival created the dolls Fofão and Fofinho, and the first one, whose gardener was made by Ney Galvão, was interpreted by Orival . Fofão was so successful that, with the end of the global program, he won his daily program TV Fofão (Bandeirantes), in which he presented humorous pictures and cartoons. He also starred in a movie for the cinema (Fofão e a Nave sem Rumo) in 1989, had several licensed products under his name, and released 10 discs.

In 2014, Orival starred unmasked in the global series Amores Roubados as Father José, opposite Patrícia Pillar. In that same year, his character Fofão paraded in the carnival being honored by the school Rosas de Ouro that brought the theme "Unforgettable" recalling figures that marked the lives of many people.

He died on 14 October 2016, aged 72, after being admitted to Hospital São Luiz, in São Paulo, to undergo treatment against a cancer in the spleen.

After Pessini's death, according to his wishes, the masks (and their molds) of his characters were destroyed. Pessini feared that others would misuse his materials whether deliberately or not.

== Filmography ==
- Balão Mágico as Fofão
- Escolinha do Professor Raimundo as Patropi
- Amores Roubados
