= Popstar season 3 =

Popstar
- Season 3
- Hosted by: Taís Araújo; João Côrtes
- Winner: Jakson Follmann
- Runner-up: Helga Nemeczyk

Release
- Original network: Rede Globo
- Original release: October 27 – December 29, 2019

Season chronology
- ← Previous; Season 2

The third season of Popstar, premiered on Rede Globo on Sunday, October 27, 2019 at 1:00 p.m. / 12:00 p.m. (BRT / AMT).

== Contestants ==
Celebrity	Notability (known for)	Status
Claudia Ohana	Actress	Eliminated 1st on November 24, 2019
Letícia Sabatella	Actress	Eliminated 2nd on December 1, 2019
Marcelo Serrado	Actor	Eliminated 3rd on December 8, 2019
Babi	TV host	Eliminated 4th on December 15, 2019
Nany People	Comedian	Eliminated 5th on December 22, 2019
George Sauma	Actor	Eliminated 6th on December 22, 2019
Robson Nunes	Actor	Eliminated 7th on December 22, 2019
Danilo Vieira	Journalist	Eliminated 8th on December 29, 2019
Eriberto Leão	Actor	Eliminated 9th on December 29, 2019
Totia Meireles	Actress	Eliminated 10th on December 29, 2019
Yara Charry	Actress	Eliminated 11th on December 29, 2019
Helga Nemeczyk	Actress	Runner-up on December 29, 2019
Jakson Follmann	Former football player	Winner on December 29, 2019

== Elimination chart ==
Key
– Contestant did not perform
– Contestant was in the bottom two and relegated to elimination zone
– Contestant received the lowest combined score and was eliminated
– Contestant received the highest combined score
– Contestant received the highest combined score and won immunity
– Contestant finished as runner-up
– Contestant finished as the winner

	Week 1	Week 2	Week 3	Week 4	Week 5		Week 6	Week 7	Week 8		Week 9		Week 10		
	Week 1	Week 2	Week 3	Week 4	Rnd 1	Rnd 2	Week 6	Week 7	Rnd 1	Rnd 2	Rnd 1	Rnd 2	Rnd 1	Rnd 2	Rnd 3
Jakson	1st 20.94	2nd 41.77	1st 72.62	1st 103.48	1st 30.83		Immune	1st 30.69		1st 30.69	Immune		1st 30.64	1st 30.76	Winner; 30.76
Helga	1st 20.94	1st 41.86	4th 72.30	2nd 103.01	3rd 30.55		7th 30.48	8th 30.37	4th 30.49		1st 30.65		2nd 30.56	2nd 30.45	Runner-up; 30.46
Yara	5th 20.83	7th 41.64	10th 72.03	3rd 102.59	4th 30.48		10th 30.37	5th 30.41	2nd 30.56	2nd 30.53	4th 30.48	1st 30.73	3rd 30.43	3rd 30.39	Eliminated (week 10)
Totia	3rd 20.87	3rd 41.75	3rd 72.35	5th 102.93	7th 30.41		3rd 30.61	7th 30.48	6th 30.44		3rd 30.50		4th 30.38	4th 30.31	Eliminated (week 10)
Eriberto	5th 20.83	8th 41.63	7th 72.24	6th 102.79	8th 30.21		8th 30.45	3rd 30.44	7th 30.42		8th 30.27	2nd 30.62	5th 30.32	Eliminated (week 10)	
Danilo	13th 19.69	13th 40.53	13th 71.19			1st 30.65	2nd 30.62	3rd 30.44	1st 30.58	4th 29.49	2nd 30.53		6th 30.21	Eliminated (week 10)	
Robson	12th 20.73	9th 41.54	6th 72.27	4th 102.97	2nd 30.62		5th 30.50	2nd 30.46	8th 30.35		6th 30.42	3rd 30.54	Eliminated (week 9)		
George	9th 20.80	12th 41.42	9th 72.05	9th 102.58	9th 30.18		5th 30.50	9th 30.34	3rd 30.55	3rd 30.39	7th 30.28	4th 30.43	Eliminated (week 9)		
Nany	11th 20.75	10th 41.50	11th 71.91	11th 102.40		2nd 30.61	1st 30.68	Immune	5th 30.47		5th 30.43	5th 29.36	Eliminated (week 9)		
Babi	10th 20.78	4th 41.71	2nd 72.37	7th 102.73	5th 30.45		4th 30.48	5th 30.41	9th 30.30	Eliminated (week 8)					
Marcelo	4th 20.84	6th 41.67	8th 72.12	10th 102.54		3rd 30.51	8th 30.45	10th 30.26	Eliminated (week 7)						
Letícia	7th 20.81	5th 41.70	5th 72.27	8th 102.71	6th 30.43		11th 30.33	Eliminated (week 6)							
Claudia	7th 20.81	11th 41.49	12th 71.88			4th 30.12	Eliminated (week 5)								

=== Week 1 ===
Specialists

- Artur Xexéo
- Dinho Ouro Preto
- Manu Gavassi
- Marcelo Soares
- Maria Rita
- Preta Gil
- Pretinho da Serrinha
- Rosanah Fienngo
- Tony Tornado
- Vanessa da Mata

Act	Order	Song	Scores			Total	Result
Act	Order	Song	Spec.	Studio	Public	Total	Result
Eriberto Leão	1	"Rádio Pirata"	9.98 (+1)	9.85	None	20.83	None
Babi	2	"Medo Bobo"	9.96 (+1)	9.82	None	20.78	None
Totia Meireles	3	"Não Deixe o Samba Morrer"	9.97 (+1)	9.90	None	20.87	None
Helga Nemeczyk	4	"Chandelier"	9.99 (+1)	9.95	None	20.94	None
Danilo Vieira	5	"Tudo com Você"	9.89 (+0)	9.89	None	19.69	None
Letícia Sabatella	6	"Miss Celie's Blues"	10.0 (+1)	9.81	None	20.81	None
Marcelo Serrado	7	"I've Got You Under My Skin"	9.98 (+1)	9.86	None	20.84	None
Robson Nunes	8	"Pesadão"	9.95 (+1)	9.78	None	20.73	None
Claudia Ohana	9	"Man! I Feel Like a Woman!"	9.95 (+1)	9.86	None	20.81	None
George Sauma	10	"Água De Chuva No Mar"	9.98 (+1)	9.82	None	20.80	None
Yara Charry	11	"La Vie en rose"	9.99 (+1)	9.84	None	20.83	None
Nany People	12	"Nuvem de Lágrimas"	9.97 (+1)	9.78	None	20.75	None
Jakson Follmann	13	"Tente Outra Vez"	10.0 (+1)	9.94	None	20.94	None

=== Week 2 ===
Specialists

- Diogo Nogueira
- Elza Soares
- Gustavo Mioto
- João Augusto
- Luiza Possi
- Mariana Aydar
- Paulo Ricardo
- Projota
- Toni Garrido
- Sandra de Sá

Act	Order	Song	Scores			Total	Result
Act	Order	Song	Spec.	Studio	Public	Total	Result
Marcelo Serrado	1	"Garçom"	9.97 (+1)	9.86	None	20.83	None
Yara Charry	2	"That's What I Like"	9.94 (+1)	9.87	None	20.81	None
George Sauma	3	"Pura Adrenalina"	9.98 (+1)	9.64	None	20.62	None
Totia Meireles	4	"Tá Combinado"	9.99 (+1)	9.89	None	20.88	None
Claudia Ohana	5	"Bang"	9.91 (+1)	9.77	None	20.68	None
Jakson Follmann	6	"Cê Que Sabe"	9.99 (+1)	9.84	None	20.83	None
Helga Nemeczyk	7	"Tombei"	10.0 (+1)	9.92	None	20.92	None
Eriberto Leão	8	"Blowin' in the Wind"	9.98 (+1)	9.82	None	20.80	None
Letícia Sabatella	9	"A Rã"	10.0 (+1)	9.89	None	20.89	None
Robson Nunes	10	"Bebete Vãobora / Condição"	9.93 (+1)	9.88	None	20.81	None
Danilo Vieira	11	"Onda Anda Você / Corcovado"	9.95 (+1)	9.89	None	20.84	None
Babi	12	"Wrecking Ball"	9.97 (+1)	9.96	None	20.93	None
Nany People	13	"O Que É, o Que É?"	9.91 (+1)	9.94	None	20.75	None

=== Week 3 ===
Specialists

- Dennis Carvalho
- Elymar Santos
- Gaby Amarantos
- Hamilton de Holanda
- Karol Conka
- Lexa
- Mari Moon
- Monarco
- Paulo Miklos
- Rael

Act	Order	Song	Scores			Total	Result
Act	Order	Song	Spec.	Studio	Public	Total	Result
Helga Nemeczyk	1	"Esse Brilho É Meu"	9.99 (+1)	9.82	9.63	30.44	Safe
Nany People	2	"Menino do Rio"	9.96 (+1)	9.74	9.71	30.41	Safe
Eriberto Leão	3	"Eu Nasci Há 10 Mil Anos Atrás"	9.99 (+1)	9.91	9.71	30.61	Safe
Claudia Ohana	4	"You and I"	10.0 (+1)	9.86	9.53	30.39	Relegated
Danilo Vieira	5	"São Gonça"	9.94 (+1)	9.90	9.82	30.66	Relegated
Marcelo Serrado	6	"Just the Way You Are"	9.92 (+1)	9.90	9.63	30.45	Safe
Yara Charry	7	"Decote"	9.95 (+1)	9.80	9.64	30.39	Safe
Robson Nunes	8	"Nem Vem Que Não Tem"	10.0 (+1)	9.92	9.81	30.73	Safe
Babi	9	"I Put a Spell on You"	10.0 (+1)	9.91	9.75	30.66	Safe
George Sauma	10	"Flash / Boa Noite"	9.98 (+1)	9.85	9.80	30.63	Safe
Jakson Follmann	11	"Flor e o Beija Flor"	9.96 (+1)	9.95	9.94	30.85	Safe
Letícia Sabatella	12	"Titanium"	9.94 (+1)	9.89	9.74	30.57	Safe
Totia Meireles	13	"Divino Maravilhoso"	9.98 (+1)	9.86	9.76	30.60	Safe

=== Week 4 ===
Specialists

- Buchecha
- Chico Barney
- Daniel
- Emanuelle Araújo
- Péricles
- Roberto Menescal
- Rosemary
- Samuel Rosa
- Xênia França
- Zizi Possi

Act	Order	Song	Scores			Total	Result
Act	Order	Song	Spec.	Studio	Public	Total	Result
Babi	1	"Atrasadinha"	9.97 (+1)	9.88	9.51	30.36	Safe
Marcelo Serrado	2	"Eu Não Sou Cachorro Não"	9.96 (+1)	9.91	9.55	30.42	Relegated
George Sauma	3	"O Que É o Amor?"	9.98 (+1)	9.86	9.69	30.53	Safe
Nany People	4	"Show das Poderosas"	9.96 (+1)	9.81	9.72	30.42	Relegated
Letícia Sabatella	5	"Canto das Três Raças"	9.96 (+1)	9.86	9.62	30.44	Safe
Totia Meireles	6	"Fica Comigo Esta Noite"	9.98 (+1)	9.96	9.64	30.58	Safe
Jakson Follmann	7	"Menina Veneno"	9.98 (+1)	9.96	9.92	30.86	Safe
Yara Charry	8	"Coração Vagabundo"	10.0 (+1)	9.85	9.71	30.56	Safe
Robson Nunes	9	"Vem Quente Que Eu Estou Fervendo"	9.98 (+1)	9.95	9.77	30.70	Safe
Helga Nemeczyk	10	"Set Fire to the Rain"	9.98 (+1)	9.99	9.74	30.71	Safe
Eriberto Leão	11	"Era Um Garoto Que Como Eu Amava..."	9.91 (+1)	9.90	9.74	30.55	Safe

=== Week 5 ===
Specialists

- Ana Carolina
- Bellutti
- Junior Lima
- Marcos
- Maria Rita
- Paulo Lima
- Roberta Sá
- Tony Tornado
- Vitor Kley
- Wanderléa

Act	Order	Song	Scores			Total	Result
Act	Order	Song	Spec.	Studio	Public	Total	Result
Robson Nunes	1	"O Descobridor Dos Sete Mares"	9.89 (+1)	9.81	9.92	30.62	Safe
Yara Charry	2	"Rolling in the Deep"	9.98 (+1)	9.82	9.68	30.48	Safe
Totia Meireles	3	"Esperando na Janela"	9.95 (+1)	9.83	9.63	30.41	Safe
Eriberto Leão	4	"Basket Case"	9.86 (+1)	9.72	9.63	30.21	Safe
Helga Nemeczyk	5	"End of Time"	10.0 (+1)	9.89	9.66	30.55	Safe
Letícia Sabatella	6	"Back to Black"	9.91 (+1)	9.83	9.69	30.43	Safe
George Sauma	7	"O Último Romântico"	9.91 (+1)	9.64	9.63	30.18	Safe
Babi	8	"Heaven"	9.94 (+1)	9.87	9.64	30.45	Safe
Jakson Follmann	9	"Logo Eu"	9.99 (+1)	9.91	9.93	30.83	Immunity
Claudia Ohana	1	"Black is Beautiful"	9.88 (+1)	9.67	9.57	30.12	Eliminated
Danilo Vieira	2	"Pais e Filhos"	9.83 (+1)	9.94	9.88	30.65	Safe
Nany People	3	"50 Reais"	9.93 (+1)	9.82	9.86	30.61	Safe
Marcelo Serrado	4	"You've Got a Friend in Me"	9.91 (+1)	9.80	9.80	30.51	Safe

=== Week 6 ===
Specialists

- Byafra
- Dudu Nobre
- Ed Motta
- Fafá de Belém
- Fernanda Abreu
- Gabriel Moura
- Joelma Mendes
- Luiza Possi
- Paula Mattos
- Tony Goes

Act	Order	Song	Scores			Total	Result
Act	Order	Song	Spec.	Studio	Public	Total	Result
Jakson Follmann	1	"Impressionando os Anjos"	Not scored				Safe
Eriberto Leão	2	"Exagerado"	9.90 (+1)	9.87	9.68	30.45	Safe
Yara Charry	3	"Meu Talismã"	9.92 (+1)	9.82	9.63	30.37	Safe
Letícia Sabatella	4	"Travessia"	9.87 (+1)	9.84	9.62	30.33	Eliminated
George Sauma	5	"Verdade"	9.92 (+1)	9.89	9.69	30.50	Safe
Danilo Vieira	6	"Nosso Estranho Amor"	9.93 (+1)	9.90	9.79	30.62	Safe
Helga Nemeczyk	7	"Side to Side"	9.94 (+1)	9.84	9.70	30.48	Safe
Totia Meireles	8	"Nem Morta"	9.96 (+1)	9.92	9.73	30.61	Safe
Marcelo Serrado	9	"Fly Me to the Moon"	9.96 (+1)	9.91	9.58	30.45	Safe
Babi	10	"Firework"	9.96 (+1)	9.92	9.70	30.58	Safe
Nany People	11	"Tigresa"	10.0 (+1)	9.91	9.77	30.68	Immunity
Robson Nunes	12	"Walk This Way / A Saga de Robson"	9.98 (+1)	9.80	9.72	30.50	Safe

=== Week 7 ===
Specialists

- Branco Mello
- Eduardo Dussek
- Karol Conka
- Lucy Alves
- Martinho da Vila
- Paulo Ricardo
- Roberta Miranda
- Sarah Oliveira
- Sergio Affonso
- Sidney Magal

Act	Order	Song	Scores			Total	Result
Act	Order	Song	Spec.	Studio	Public	Total	Result
Nany People	1	"Sob Medida"	Not scored				Safe
Danilo Vieira	2	"Can't Take My Eyes Off You"	9.90 (+1)	9.83	9.71	30.44	Safe
Helga Nemeczyk	3	"Apaga a Luz"	9.95 (+1)	9.84	9.58	30.37	Safe
Babi	4	"Try"	9.98 (+1)	9.85	9.58	30.41	Safe
Robson Nunes	5	"Manuel / Superstition"	9.94 (+1)	9.90	9.62	30.46	Safe
Eriberto Leão	6	"Meu Erro"	9.95 (+1)	9.86	9.63	30.44	Safe
Yara Charry	7	"Love Never Felt So Good"	9.96 (+1)	9.83	9.62	30.41	Safe
George Sauma	8	"Gatas Extraordinárias"	9.96 (+1)	9.76	9.62	30.34	Safe
Jakson Follmann	9	"É Preciso Saber Viver"	9.94 (+1)	9.82	9.93	30.69	Immunity
Totia Meireles	10	"O Tempo Não Pára"	9.96 (+1)	9.81	9.61	30.38	Safe
Marcelo Serrado	11	"Meu Sangue Ferve Por Você"	9.92 (+1)	9.87	9.47	30.26	Eliminated

=== Week 8 ===
Specialists

- Ana Carolina
- Daniela Mercury
- Di Ferrero
- Didi Wagner
- Elba Ramalho
- George Israel
- Hamilton de Holanda
- Ivan Lins
- Manu Gavassi
- Paulo Junqueiro

Act	Order	Song	Scores			Total	Result
Act	Order	Song	Spec.	Studio	Public	Total	Result
Babi	1	"Nós"	9.95 (+1)	9.77	9.58	30.30	Eliminated
Robson Nunes	2	"Ive Brussel"	9.91 (+1)	9.86	9.58	30.35	Safe
Eriberto Leão	3	"Agora Só Falta Você"	9.96 (+1)	9.91	9.55	30.42	Safe
Helga Nemeczyk	4	"When You Believe"	10.0 (+1)	9.85	9.64	30.49	Safe
Nany People	5	"Perigosa"	9.93 (+1)	9.91	9.63	30.47	Safe
Danilo Vieira	6	"Folhetim"	9.93 (+1)	9.87	9.78	30.58	Qualified
Yara Charry	7	"Rehab"	9.95 (+1)	9.95	9.66	30.56	Qualified
George Sauma	8	"Se Não Tiver Amor"	9.99 (+1)	9.83	9.73	30.55	Qualified
Totia Meireles	9	"Volta Por Cima"	9.98 (+1)	9.85	9.61	30.44	Safe
Jakson Follmann	1	"Volta Pra Mim"	9.97 (+1)	9.81	9.91	30.69	Finalist
Danilo Vieira	2	"Que Pena"	9.89 (+0)	9.89	9.71	29.49	Safe
Yara Charry	3	"Quelqu'un m'a dit"	10.0 (+1)	9.93	9.60	30.53	Safe
George Sauma	4	"Advinha"	9.91 (+1)	9.85	9.63	30.39	Safe

=== Week 9: Semifinals ===
Specialists

- Amelinha
- Bernardo Araújo
- Ed Motta
- Emanuelle Araújo
- Luciana Mello
- Monarco
- Paula Fernandes
- Paulinho Moska
- Tato
- Vitor Kley

Act	Order	Song	Scores			Total	Result
Act	Order	Song	Spec.	Studio	Public	Total	Result
Totia Meireles	1	"Sangrando"	9.97 (+1)	9.91	9.62	30.50	Finalist
Nany People	2	"A Loba"	9.91 (+1)	9.88	9.64	30.43	Bottom five
Robson Nunes	3	"Deixa Isso Pra Lá"	9.95 (+1)	9.87	9.60	30.42	Bottom five
Yara Charry	4	"Les Eaux de Mars / Águas de Março"	9.98 (+1)	9.90	9.60	30.48	Bottom five
George Sauma	5	"Coleção"	9.87 (+1)	9.80	9.61	30.28	Bottom five
Danilo Vieira	6	"Diz que Eu Fui por Aí"	9.91 (+1)	9.90	9.72	30.53	Finalist
Eriberto Leão	7	"A Palo Seco"	9.94 (+1)	9.80	9.53	30.27	Bottom five
Helga Nemeczyk	8	"If I Ain't Got You"	9.99 (+1)	9.93	9.73	30.65	Finalist
Jakson Follmann	9	"Ferida Curada"	Not scored				Finalist
Nany People	1	"Vidro Fumê"	9.89 (+0)	9.81	9.66	29.36	Eliminated
Robson Nunes	2	"Vesti Azul"	9.95 (+1)	9.86	9.73	30.54	Eliminated
Yara Charry	3	"No One"	9.99 (+1)	9.93	9.81	30.73	Finalist
George Sauma	4	"Livre pra Voar"	9.91 (+1)	9.77	9.75	30.43	Eliminated
Eriberto Leão	5	"Homem Primata"	9.97 (+1)	9.91	9.94	30.62	Finalist

=== Week 10: Finals ===
Specialists

- Alinne Rosa
- Artur Xexéo
- Dudu Nobre
- Emilio Dantas
- Fafá de Belém
- Marcelo Soares
- Maria Rita
- Preta Gil
- Projota
- Tony Tornado

Act	Order	Song	Scores			Total	Result
Act	Order	Song	Spec.	Studio	Public	Total	Result
Jakson Follmann	1	"Propaganda"	9.95 (+1)	9.83	9.86	30.64	Safe
Yara Charry	2	"Non, je ne regrette rien"	9.98 (+1)	9.88	9.57	30.43	Safe
Danilo Vieira	3	"Água de Beber"	9.90 (+1)	9.73	9.58	30.21	Eliminated
Eriberto Leão	4	"Aluga-se"	9.98 (+1)	9.88	9.46	30.32	Eliminated
Totia Meireles	5	"Força Estranha"	9.98 (+1)	9.91	9.49	30.38	Safe
Helga Nemeczyk	6	"Como Nossos Pais"	9.99 (+1)	9.93	9.64	30.56	Safe
Jakson Follmann	1	"Tocando em Frente"	9.99 (+1)	9.92	9.85	30.76	Safe
Yara Charry	2	"Dona de Mim"	9.92 (+1)	9.88	9.59	30.39	Eliminated
Totia Meireles	3	"Gota d'Água"	9.95 (+1)	9.86	9.50	30.31	Eliminated
Helga Nemeczyk	4	"Listen To Your Heart"	9.95 (+1)	9.87	9.63	30.45	Safe
Jakson Follmann	1	"Evidências"	9.97 (+1)	9.91	9.88	30.76	Winner
Helga Nemeczyk	2	"Un-Break My Heart"	9.99 (+1)	9.86	9.61	30.46	Runner-up

== Ratings and reception ==
=== Brazilian ratings ===
All numbers are in points and provided by Kantar Ibope Media.

Episode	Title	Air date	Timeslot (BRT)	SP viewers (in points)	Source
1	Top 13	October 27, 2019	Sunday 1:00 p.m.	11.5	
2	Top 13	November 3, 2019	Sunday 1:00 p.m.	10.8	
3	Top 13	November 10, 2019	Sunday 1:00 p.m.	11.0	
4	Top 13	November 17, 2019	Sunday 1:00 p.m.	09.5	
5	Top 13	November 24, 2019	Sunday 1:00 p.m.	11.2	
6	Top 12	December 1, 2019	Sunday 1:00 p.m.	09.4	
7	Top 11	December 8, 2019	Sunday 1:00 p.m.	09.0	
8	Top 10	December 15, 2019	Sunday 1:00 p.m.	10.2	
9	Top 9	December 22, 2019	Sunday 1:00 p.m.	09.5	
10	Winner announced	December 29, 2019	Sunday 1:00 p.m.	10.4	

- In 2019, each point represents 254.892 households in 15 market cities in Brazil (73.015 households in São Paulo).
