= Popstar season 2 =

Popstar
- Season 2
- Hosted by: Taís Araújo; Tiago Abravanel
- Winner: Jeniffer Nascimento
- Runner-up: João Côrtes

Release
- Original network: Rede Globo
- Original release: September 16 – November 18, 2018

Season chronology
- ← Previous; Season 1 Next → Season 3

The second season of Popstar, premiered on Rede Globo on Sunday, September 16, 2018 at 1:00 p.m. / 12:00 p.m. (BRT / AMT).

== Contestants ==
Celebrity	Notability (known for)	Status
Fernando Caruso	Comedian	Eliminated 1st on October 14, 2018
Eri Johnson	Actor	Eliminated 2nd on October 21, 2018
Carol Trentini	Model	Eliminated 3rd on October 28, 2018
Klara Castanho	Actress	Eliminated 4th on November 4, 2018
Fafy Siqueira	Comedian	Eliminated 5th on November 4, 2018
Jonathan Azevedo	Actor	Eliminated 6th on November 11, 2018
Lua Blanco	Actress	Eliminated 7th on November 11, 2018
Samantha	Actress	Eliminated 8th on November 11, 2018
Sérgio Guizé	Actor	Eliminated 9th on November 18, 2018
Mouhamed Harfouch	Actor	Eliminated 10th on November 18, 2018
Renata Capucci	Journalist	Eliminated 11th on November 18, 2018
Malu Rodrigues	Actress	Eliminated 12th on November 18, 2018
João Côrtes	Actor	Runner-up on November 18, 2018
Jeniffer Nascimento	Actress	Winner on November 18, 2018

== Elimination chart ==
Key
– Contestant did not perform
– Contestant was in the bottom two and relegated to elimination zone
– Contestant received the lowest combined score and was eliminated
– Contestant received the highest combined score
– Contestant received the highest combined score and won immunity
– Contestant finished as runner-up
– Contestant finished as the winner

	Week 1	Week 2	Week 3	Week 4	Week 5		Week 6	Week 7	Week 8		Week 9		Week 10		
	Week 1	Week 2	Week 3	Week 4	Rnd 1	Rnd 2	Week 6	Week 7	Rnd 1	Rnd 2	Rnd 1	Rnd 2	Rnd 1	Rnd 2	Rnd 3
Jeniffer Nascimento	1st 20.93	1st 20.92	1st 72.55	1st 103.39	1st 30.87	—N/a	—	1st 30.82	—N/a	2nd 30.71	1st 30.82	—N/a	1st 30.80	1st 30.78	Winner; 30.84
João Côrtes	14th 20.44	11th 19.62	10th 70.86	9th 101.44	8th 30.30	—N/a	1st 30.86	—	3rd 30.53	3rd 30.63	2nd 30.74	—N/a	2nd 30.73	2nd 30.65	Runner-up; 30.31
Malu Rodrigues	4th 20.79	2nd 20.89	2nd 72.40	2nd 103.16	3rd 30.66	—N/a	2nd 30.78	2nd 30.79	1st 30.73	1st 30.72	—	—N/a	3rd 30.72	3rd 30.65	Eliminated (week 10)
Renata Capucci	5th 20.67	6th 20.72	6th 72.03	5th 102.37	6th 30.42	—N/a	10th 30.17	5th 30.52	6th 30.49	—N/a	3rd 30.60	—N/a	4th 30.46	4th 30.30	Eliminated (week 10)
Mouhamed Harfouch	10th 20.53	10th 19.62	12th 70.66	12th 100.92		3rd 30.44	4th 30.55	8th 30.42	4th 30.51	—N/a	8th 29.25	2nd 30.57	6th 30.41	Eliminated (week 10)	
Sérgio Guizé	9th 20.56	7th 20.69	7th 72.00	6th 102.26	7th 30.33	—N/a	8th 30.48	6th 30.52	5th 30.49	—N/a	4th 30.50	1st 30.66	6th 30.31	Eliminated (week 10)	
Samantha	2nd 20.85	3rd 20.88	3rd 72.27	3rd 102.81	5th 30.50	—N/a	9th 30.47	10th 30.38	8th 30.25	—N/a	6th 30.34	3rd 30.47	Eliminated (week 9)		
Lua Blanco	11th 20.52	9th 19.74	9th 71.00	8th 101.52	10th 29.32	—N/a	3rd 30.58	4th 30.58	3rd 30.51	4th 30.38	7th 30.32	4th 30.40	Eliminated (week 9)		
Jonathan Azevedo	20.83	8th 20.68	4th 72.09	4th 102.58	2nd 30.68	—N/a	7th 30.49	3rd 30.69	7th 30.27	—N/a	5th 30.40	5th 30.35	Eliminated (week 9)		
Fafy Siqueira	6th 20.67	4th 20.84	5th 72.08	7th 102.19	4th 30.51	—N/a	5th 30.53	9th 30.39	9th 30.19	Eliminated (week 8)					
Klara Castanho	12th 20.52	13th 19.59	13th 70.54			2nd 30.54	6th 30.52	7th 30.44	10th 29.25	Eliminated (week 8)					
Carol Trentini	7th 20.65	12th 19.59	11th 70.75	11th 101.19		1st 30.58	10th 30.45	11th 30.35	Eliminated (week 7)						
Eri Johnson	8th 20.64	5th 20.78	8th 71.30	10th 101.32	9th 30.03	—N/a	12th 30.16	Eliminated (week 6)							
Fernando Caruso	13th 20.45	14th 19.49	14th 70.10			4th 30.39	Eliminated (week 5)								

=== Week 1 ===
Specialists

- Benito di Paula
- Bruno Belutti
- Dado Villa-Lobos
- Junior Lima
- Marcos Prado
- Marcelo Soares
- MariMoon
- Preta Gil
- Tony Garrido
- Vanessa da Mata

Act	Order	Song	Scores			Total	Result
Act	Order	Song	Spec.	Studio	Public	Total	Result
Fafy Siqueira	1	"Eu Sei de Cor"	9.93 (+1)	9.74	None	20.67	None
Lua Blanco	2	"Comida"	9.84 (+1)	9.68	None	20.52	None
João Côrtes	3	"Blues da Piedade"	9.87 (+1)	9.57	None	20.44	None
Malu Rodrigues	4	"All of Me"	9.92 (+1)	9.87	None	20.79	None
Samantha	5	"Love on the Brain"	9.93 (+1)	9.92	None	20.85	None
Eri Johnson	6	"Dois Passos do Paraíso"	9.88 (+1)	9.76	None	20.64	None
Renata Capucci	7	"Isn't She Lovely"	9.83 (+1)	9.84	None	20.67	None
Fernando Caruso	8	"Amante Profissional"	9.80 (+1)	9.65	None	20.45	None
Jeniffer Nascimento	9	"Love on Top"	9.98 (+1)	9.95	None	20.93	None
Jonathan Azevedo	10	"Retalhos de Cetim"	9.96 (+1)	9.87	None	20.83	None
Carol Trentini	11	"True Colors"	9.80 (+1)	9.85	None	20.65	None
Klara Castanho	12	"O Sol"	9.77 (+1)	9.76	None	20.52	None
Mouhamed Harfouch	13	"Beautiful Day"	9.77 (+1)	9.76	None	20.53	None
Sérgio Guizé	14	"Admirável Gado Novo"	9.81 (+1)	9.75	None	20.56	None

=== Week 2 ===
Specialists

- Artur Xexéo
- Bell Marques
- Daniel
- Elba Ramalho
- Ferrugem
- Leila Pinheiro
- Roberta Sá
- Samuel Rosa
- Sidney Magal
- Vitor Kley

Act	Order	Song	Scores			Total	Result
Act	Order	Song	Spec.	Studio	Public	Total	Result
Jonathan Azevedo	1	"Proibida para Mim"	9.86 (+1)	9.82	None	20.68	None
Malu Rodrigues	2	"Crazy"	9.98 (+1)	9.91	None	20.89	None
Fernando Caruso	3	"Papai, Me Empresta o Carro"	9.84 (+0)	9.65	None	19.49	None
Samantha	4	"Havana"	9.95 (+1)	9.93	None	20.88	None
João Côrtes	5	"João de Barro"	9.86 (+0)	9.76	None	19.62	None
Klara Castanho	6	"Don't Stop Believin'"	9.82 (+0)	9.77	None	19.59	None
Sérgio Guizé	7	"Cowboy Fora da Lei"	9.88 (+1)	9.81	None	20.69	None
Eri Johnson	8	"Baianidade Nagô"	9.88 (+1)	9.80	None	20.68	None
Fafy Siqueira	9	"Pra Começar"	9.98 (+1)	9.86	None	20.84	None
Lua Blanco	10	"What About Us"	9.88 (+0)	9.86	None	19.74	None
Carol Trentini	11	"Dona Cila"	9.84 (+0)	9.75	None	19.59	None
Mouhamed Harfouch	12	"Perfect"	9.81 (+0)	9.81	None	19.62	None
Renata Capucci	13	"Por Você"	9.82 (+1)	9.90	None	20.72	None
Jeniffer Nascimento	14	"Sorry Not Sorry"	9.97 (+1)	9.95	None	20.92	None

=== Week 3 ===
Specialists

- Dennis Carvalho
- Elymar Santos
- Iza
- Margareth Menezes
- Mariana Aydar
- Paula Mattos
- Paulo Lima
- Paulo Ricardo
- Projota
- Xande de Pilares

Act	Order	Song	Scores			Total	Result
Act	Order	Song	Spec.	Studio	Public	Total	Result
Jeniffer Nascimento	1	"Soul de Verão"	9.98 (+1)	9.91	9.81	30.70	Safe
Eri Johnson	2	"Amor Perfeito"	9.81 (+1)	9.75	9.32	29.88	Safe
Samantha	3	"Son of a Preacher Man"	10.0 (+1)	9.92	9.62	30.54	Safe
Fernando Caruso	4	"As Sete Vampiras"	9.83 (+1)	9.83	9.50	30.16	Relegated
Jonathan Azevedo	5	"Não Deixe o Samba Morrer"	9.96 (+1)	9.93	9.69	30.58	Safe
Sérgio Guizé	6	"Até Quando Esperar"	10.0 (+1)	9.93	9.81	30.74	Safe
Carol Trentini	7	"Every Breath You Take"	9.86 (+1)	9.89	9.76	30.51	Safe
Renata Capucci	8	"Meu Lugar"	9.95 (+1)	9.92	9.77	30.64	Safe
Mouhamed Harfouch	9	"Exagerado"	9.87 (+1)	9.93	9.71	30.51	Safe
Klara Castanho	10	"Story of My Life"	9.81 (+1)	9.90	9.71	30.43	Relegated
João Côrtes	11	"Feeling Good"	10.0 (+1)	9.88	9.91	30.80	Safe
Malu Rodrigues	12	"Nada Mais"	9.96 (+1)	9.90	9.85	30.72	Safe
Lua Blanco	13	"Are You Gonna Be My Girl"	9.93 (+1)	9.94	9.87	30.74	Safe
Fafy Siqueira	14	"Cheguei"	9.97 (+1)	9.84	9.76	30.57	Safe

=== Week 4 ===
Specialists

- Di Ferrero
- Diogo Nogueira
- Fernanda Abreu
- João Augusto
- Lucy Alves
- Marcelo Serrado
- Sandra de Sá
- Simony
- Xand Avião
- Zeeba

Act	Order	Song	Scores			Total	Result
Act	Order	Song	Spec.	Studio	Public	Total	Result
Sérgio Guizé	1	"Menina Linda"	9.90 (+1)	9.66	9.70	30.26	Safe
Fafy Siqueira	2	"O Portão"	9.93 (+1)	9.68	9.50	30.11	Safe
Lua Blanco	3	"Help!"	9.90 (+1)	9.90	9.72	30.52	Safe
Eri Johnson	4	"Fogo e Paixão"	9.90 (+1)	9.76	9.36	30.02	Safe
Carol Trentini	5	"Ironic"	9.90 (+1)	9.80	9.74	30.44	Relegated
Renata Capucci	6	"Garganta"	9.82 (+1)	9.87	9.65	30.34	Safe
Mouhamed Harfouch	7	"Blá Blá Blá... Eu Te Amo"	9.89 (+1)	9.72	9.65	30.26	Relegated
Samantha	8	"Aprendendo a Jogar"	9.99 (+1)	9.90	9.65	30.54	Safe
Malu Rodrigues	9	"Se Eu Quiser Falar Com Deus"	10.0 (+1)	9.93	9.83	30.76	Safe
Jeniffer Nascimento	10	"I Have Nothing"	9.99 (+1)	9.98	9.87	30.84	Safe
João Côrtes	11	"I'll Be There"	9.90 (+1)	9.83	9.85	30.58	Safe
Jonathan Azevedo	12	"Aurora Boreal"	9.97 (+1)	9.77	9.75	30.49	Safe

=== Week 5 ===
Specialists

- Baby do Brasil
- DJ Memê
- João Marcelo Bôscoli
- Luiza Possi
- Manu Gavassi
- Naiara Azevedo
- Nasi
- Péricles
- Roberto Menescal
- Tato

Round 1

Act	Order	Song	Scores			Total	Result
Act	Order	Song	Spec.	Studio	Public	Total	Result
Lua Blanco	1	"10%"	9.92 (+0)	9.78	9.62	29.32	Safe
Renata Capucci	2	"Mamma Mia"	9.92 (+1)	9.85	9.65	30.42	Safe
João Côrtes	3	"Você"	9.93 (+1)	9.70	9.67	30.30	Safe
Eri Johnson	4	"É Preciso Saber Viver"	9.91 (+1)	9.73	9.39	30.03	Safe
Fafy Siqueira	5	"Tocando em Frente"	9.98 (+1)	9.83	9.70	30.51	Safe
Sérgio Guizé	6	"Maneiras"	9.86 (+1)	9.75	9.72	30.33	Safe
Samantha	7	"Bang Bang (My Baby Shot Me Down)"	9.98 (+1)	9.90	9.62	30.50	Safe
Jonathan Azevedo	8	"O Morro Não Tem Vez"	9.98 (+1)	9.88	9.82	30.68	Safe
Jeniffer Nascimento	9	"Bang Bang"	9.99 (+1)	9.96	9.92	30.87	Immunity
Malu Rodrigues	10	"Paciência"	9.96 (+1)	9.86	9.84	30.66	Safe

Round 2

Act	Order	Song	Scores			Total	Result
Act	Order	Song	Spec.	Studio	Public	Total	Result
Klara Castanho	1	"Meu Abrigo"	9.90 (+1)	9.88	9.76	30.54	Safe
Fernando Caruso	2	"He-Man"	9.92 (+1)	9.82	9.65	30.39	Eliminated
Carol Trentini	3	"Somewhere Only We Know"	9.92 (+1)	9.82	9.84	30.58	Safe
Mouhamed Harfouch	4	"Maior Abandonado"	9.89 (+1)	9.81	9.74	30.44	Safe

=== Week 6 ===
Specialists

- Dinho Ouro Preto
- Dudu Nobre
- Luciana Mello
- Ludmilla
- Luiz Caldas
- Maria Rita
- Pedro Luís
- Thaeme Mariôto
- Thiago Bertoldo
- Tiago Leifert

Act	Order	Song	Scores			Total	Result
Act	Order	Song	Spec.	Studio	Public	Total	Result
Jeniffer Nascimento	1	"Final Feliz"	Not scored				Safe
Carol Trentini	2	"Dreams"	9.87 (+1)	9.85	9.73	30.45	Safe
Sérgio Guizé	3	"Vem Quente Que Eu Estou Fervendo"	9.96 (+1)	9.86	9.66	30.48	Safe
Renata Capucci	4	"I Wanna Be Where You Are"	9.90 (+1)	9.71	9.56	30.17	Safe
Eri Johnson	5	"Pense Em Mim"	9.97 (+1)	9.86	9.33	30.16	Eliminated
Fafy Siqueira	6	"Black is Beautiful"	9.97 (+1)	9.94	9.62	30.53	Safe
Klara Castanho	7	"Ao Vivo e a Cores"	9.91 (+1)	9.92	9.69	30.52	Safe
Mouhamed Harfouch	8	"Last Nite"	9.94 (+1)	9.89	9.72	30.55	Safe
Malu Rodrigues	9	"Força Estranha"	9.97 (+1)	9.96	9.85	30.78	Safe
Jonathan Azevedo	10	"O Tempo Não Para / Tempo"	9.95 (+1)	9.85	9.69	30.49	Safe
Lua Blanco	11	"When We Were Young"	9.93 (+1)	9.84	9.81	30.58	Safe
Samantha	12	"A História de Lily Braun"	9.98 (+1)	9.88	9.61	30.47	Safe
João Côrtes	13	"Happy"	10.0 (+1)	9.96	9.90	30.86	Immunity

=== Week 7 ===
Specialists

- Dilsinho
- Ellen Oléria
- Gabriel Moura
- George Israel
- José Augusto
- Lan Lanh
- Leiloca Neves
- Paulinho Moska
- Teresa Cristina
- Wanessa Camargo

Act	Order	Song	Scores			Total	Result
Act	Order	Song	Spec.	Studio	Public	Total	Result
João Côrtes	1	"Over the Rainbow"	Not scored				Safe
Fafy Siqueira	2	"Se Você Pensa"	9.97 (+1)	9.86	9.56	30.39	Safe
Samantha	3	"Your Song"	9.94 (+1)	9.92	9.52	30.38	Safe
Lua Blanco	4	"Bad Romance"	9.95 (+1)	9.90	9.73	30.58	Safe
Mouhamed Harfouch	5	"Toda Forma de Amor"	9.90 (+1)	9.88	9.64	30.42	Safe
Klara Castanho	6	"Quando Você Passa"	9.89 (+1)	9.87	9.68	30.44	Safe
Carol Trentini	7	"Bizarre Love Triangle"	9.85 (+1)	9.73	9.77	30.35	Eliminated
Renata Capucci	8	"Let's Stay Together"	9.94 (+1)	9.87	9.71	30.52	Safe
Malu Rodrigues	9	"Se Todos Fossem Iguais a Você"	10.0 (+1)	9.93	9.86	30.79	Safe
Jeniffer Nascimento	10	"Girl on Fire"	10.0 (+1)	9.98	9.84	30.82	Immunity
Jonathan Azevedo	11	"Todo Menino É Um Rei / Menino Rei"	9.96 (+1)	9.96	9.77	30.69	Safe
Sérgio Guizé	12	"Mon Amour, Meu Bem, Ma Femme"	9.94 (+1)	9.83	9.75	30.52	Safe

=== Week 8 ===
Specialists

- Amado Batista
- Ancelmo Gois
- Davi Moraes
- Fafá de Belém
- Gaby Amarantos
- Gustavo Mioto
- Joelma
- Luísa Sonza
- Paulo Miklos
- Zizi Possi

Round 1

Act	Order	Song	Scores			Total	Result
Act	Order	Song	Spec.	Studio	Public	Total	Result
Jonathan Azevedo	1	"Tá Escrito"	9.93 (+1)	9.84	9.50	30.27	Safe
Klara Castanho	2	"Trevo (Tu)"	9.91 (+0)	9.74	9.60	29.25	Eliminated
João Côrtes	3	"I Wish"	9.98 (+1)	9.84	9.71	30.53	Qualified
Sérgio Guizé	4	"Sonífera Ilha"	9.94 (+1)	9.87	9.68	30.49	Safe
Renata Capucci	5	"If I Ain't Got You"	9.96 (+1)	9.81	9.68	30.45	Safe
Lua Blanco	6	"When I Was Your Man"	9.98 (+1)	9.80	9.73	30.51	Qualified
Mouhamed Harfouch	7	"You Give Love a Bad Name"	9.95 (+1)	9.88	9.68	30.51	Safe
Malu Rodrigues	8	"Canta Brasil"	10.0 (+1)	9.85	9.88	30.73	Qualified
Samantha	9	"Você Não Serve Pra Mim"	9.99 (+1)	9.78	9.48	30.25	Safe
Fafy Siqueira	10	"De Quem é a Culpa"	9.97 (+1)	9.69	9.53	30.19	Eliminated

Round 2

Act	Order	Song	Scores			Total	Result
Act	Order	Song	Spec.	Studio	Public	Total	Result
Jeniffer Nascimento	1	"Stone Cold"	10.0 (+1)	9.90	9.81	30.71	Safe
João Côrtes	2	"Georgia on My Mind"	10.0 (+1)	9.86	9.77	30.63	Safe
Lua Blanco	3	"Minha Alma (A Paz Que Eu Não Quero)"	9.94 (+1)	9.80	9.64	30.38	Safe
Malu Rodrigues	4	"Casa no Campo"	9.99 (+1)	9.88	9.85	30.72	Finalist

=== Week 9 ===
Specialists

- Angélica
- Flávio Venturini
- Frederico Nunes
- Joao Neto Nunes
- Karol Conká
- Latino
- Marcelo Soares
- Patricia Marx
- Sarah Oliveira
- Saulo Fernandes

Round 1

Act	Order	Song	Scores			Total	Result
Act	Order	Song	Spec.	Studio	Public	Total	Result
Mouhamed Harfouch	1	"Ana Júlia"	9.93 (+0)	9.78	9.54	29.25	Bottom five
Lua Blanco	2	"What's Up?"	9.89 (+1)	9.78	9.65	30.32	Bottom five
Jonathan Azevedo	3	"O Que Sobrou do Céu / Realidade Favela"	9.98 (+1)	9.82	9.60	30.40	Bottom five
Renata Capucci	4	"Livin' on a Prayer"	9.97 (+1)	9.92	9.71	30.60	Finalist
Samantha	5	"Get Up, Stand Up"	9.97 (+1)	9.83	9.54	30.34	Bottom five
Sérgio Guizé	6	"Não Quero Dinheiro (Eu Só Quero Amar)"	9.94 (+1)	9.83	9.73	30.50	Bottom five
Jeniffer Nascimento	7	"Olha o Que o Amor Me Faz (All by Myself)"	10.0 (+1)	9.94	9.88	30.82	Finalist
João Côrtes	8	"Uptown Funk"	9.98 (+1)	9.92	9.84	30.74	Finalist
Malu Rodrigues	9	"Nada por Mim"	Not scored				Finalist

Round 2

Act	Order	Song	Scores			Total	Result
Act	Order	Song	Spec.	Studio	Public	Total	Result
Mouhamed Harfouch	1	"Rock and Roll All Nite"	9.99 (+1)	9.88	9.70	30.57	Finalist
Lua Blanco	2	"Como Nosso Pais"	9.89 (+1)	9.80	9.71	30.40	Eliminated
Jonathan Azevedo	3	"Tributo a Martin Luther King"	9.96 (+1)	9.73	9.66	30.35	Eliminated
Samantha	4	"Billie Jean"	9.95 (+1)	9.88	9.64	30.47	Eliminated
Sérgio Guizé	5	"Geração Coca-Cola"	9.97 (+1)	9.88	9.81	30.66	Finalist

=== Week 10 ===
Specialists

- Artur Xexéo
- Bruno Belutti
- Di Ferrero
- Fafá de Belém
- Manu Gavassi
- Marcos Prado
- Naiara Azevedo
- Preta Gil
- Sandra de Sá
- Toni Garrido

Round 1

Act	Order	Song	Scores			Total	Result
Act	Order	Song	Spec.	Studio	Public	Total	Result
Sérgio Guizé	1	"Rua Augusta"	9.93 (+1)	9.77	9.61	30.31	Eliminated
Renata Capucci	2	"Love of My Life"	9.95 (+1)	9.86	9.65	30.46	Safe
Mouhamed Harfouch	3	"Sweet Child O' Mine"	9.95 (+1)	9.86	9.60	30.41	Eliminated
João Côrtes	4	"Unchain My Heart"	10.0 (+1)	9.94	9.79	30.73	Safe
Malu Rodrigues	5	"Fascinação"	10.0 (+1)	9.96	9.76	30.72	Safe
Jeniffer Nascimento	6	"Um Dia de Domingo"	10.0 (+1)	9.92	9.88	30.80	Safe

Round 2

Act	Order	Song	Scores			Total	Result
Act	Order	Song	Spec.	Studio	Public	Total	Result
Renata Capucci	1	"Eu Sei que Vou Te Amar"	9.95 (+1)	9.78	9.57	30.30	Eliminated
João Côrtes	2	"Cry Me a River"	10.0 (+1)	9.91	9.74	30.65	Safe
Malu Rodrigues	3	"Brasil"	9.99 (+1)	9.92	9.74	30.65	Eliminated
Jeniffer Nascimento	4	"Listen"	10.0 (+1)	9.93	9.85	30.78	Safe

Round 3

Act	Order	Song	Scores			Total	Result
Act	Order	Song	Spec.	Studio	Public	Total	Result
João Côrtes	1	"Do Seu Lado"	9.85 (+1)	9.78	9.68	30.31	Runner-up
Jeniffer Nascimento	2	"Survivor"	9.97 (+1)	9.95	9.92	30.84	PopStar

== Ratings and reception ==
=== Brazilian ratings ===
All numbers are in points and provided by Kantar Ibope Media.

Episode	Title	Air date	Timeslot (BRT)	SP viewers (in points)	Source
1	Top 14 (1)	September 16, 2018	Sunday 1:00 p.m.	12.0	
2	Top 14 (2)	September 23, 2018	Sunday 1:00 p.m.	10.5	
3	Top 14 (3)	September 30, 2018	Sunday 1:00 p.m.	11.4	
4	Top 14 (4)	October 7, 2018	Sunday 1:00 p.m.	13.1	
5	Top 14 (5)	October 14, 2018	Sunday 1:00 p.m.	12.9	
6	Top 13	October 21, 2018	Sunday 1:00 p.m.	11.1	
7	Top 12	October 28, 2018	Sunday 1:00 p.m.	13.6	
8	Top 11	November 4, 2018	Sunday 1:00 p.m.	12.4	
9	Top 9	November 11, 2018	Sunday 1:00 p.m.	11.4	
10	Winner announced	November 18, 2018	Sunday 1:00 p.m.	12.1	

- In 2018, each point represents 248.647 households in 15 market cities in Brazil (71.855 households in São Paulo)
