= Popstar season 1 =

Popstar
- Season 1
- Hosted by: Fernanda Lima; Tiago Abravanel
- Winner: André Frateschi
- Runner-up: Cláudio Lins

Release
- Original network: Rede Globo
- Original release: July 9 – September 10, 2017

Season chronology
- Next → Season 2

The first season of Popstar, premiered on Rede Globo on Sunday, July 9, 2017 at 1:00 p.m. / 12:00 p.m. (BRT / AMT).

== Contestants ==
Celebrity	Notability (known for)	Status
Murilo Rosa	Actor	Eliminated 1st on August 6, 2017
Marcello Melo Jr.	Actor	Eliminated 2nd on August 13, 2017
Marcella Rica	Actress	Eliminated 3rd on August 20, 2017
Rafael Cortez	Journalist & comedian	Eliminated 4th on August 27, 2017
Alex Escobar	Journalist & TV host	Eliminated 5th on August 27, 2017
Érico Brás	Comedian	Eliminated 6th on September 3, 2017
Thiago Fragoso	Actor	Eliminated 7th on September 3, 2017
Fabiana Karla	Comedian	Eliminated 8th on September 3, 2017
Sabrina Parlatore	TV host	Eliminated 9th on September 10, 2017
Lúcio Mauro Filho	Actor	Eliminated 10th on September 10, 2017
Eduardo Sterblitch	Comedian	Eliminated 11th on September 10, 2017
Mariana Rios	Actress	Eliminated 12th on September 10, 2017
Cláudio Lins	Actor	Runner-up on September 10, 2017
André Frateschi	Actor	Winner on September 10, 2017

== Elimination chart ==
Key
– Contestant did not perform
– Contestant was in the bottom two and relegated to elimination zone
– Contestant received the lowest combined score and was eliminated
– Contestant received the highest combined score
– Contestant received the highest combined score and won immunity
– Contestant finished as runner-up
– Contestant finished as the winner

	Week 1	Week 2	Week 3	Wk 1+3	Week 4	Wk 1+4	Week 5		Week 6	Week 7	Week 8		Week 9		Week 10		
	Week 1	Week 2	Week 3	Wk 1+3	Week 4	Wk 1+4	Rnd 1	Rnd 2	Week 6	Week 7	Rnd 1	Rnd 2	Rnd 1	Rnd 2	Rnd 1	Rnd 2	Rnd 3
André Frateschi	4th 20.55	9th 17.75	3rd 28.55	3rd 66.85	3rd 29.52	3rd 96.38	1st 30.35	—N/a	—	3rd 29.24	1st 29.84	1st 29.80	—	—N/a	1st 28.89	1st 29.40	Winner; 29.10
Claudio Lins	6th 20.40	11th 17.10	9th 22.90	8th 60.40	8th 28.71	8th 89.11	3rd 29.69	—N/a	8th 27.90	5th 29.18	3rd 29.18	2nd 28.21	2nd 27.79	1st 28.49	4th 27.43	2nd 28.22	Runner; 27.32
Mariana Rios	1st 21.00	8th 18.25	1st 29.90	1st 69.15	1st 30.30	1st 99.46	6th 28.70	—N/a	1st 30.00	—	2nd 29.29	3rd 28.00	3rd 27.70	2nd 28.36	3rd 28.25	3rd 27.24	Eliminated (wk 10)
Eduardo Sterblitch	11th 19.65	1st 19.60	6th 26.85	5th 66.10	7th 28.81	5th 94.91	8th 28.55	—N/a	4th 28.83	2nd 29.36	4th 28.53	—N/a	1st 28.59	5th 24.33	2nd 28.34	4th 19.09	Eliminated (wk 10)
Lucio Mauro Filho	7th 20.25	1st 19.60	7th 26.71	6th 65.56	5th 29.22	6th 94.78	4th 29.18	—N/a	6th 28.45	8th 27.55	8th 27.57	—N/a	6th 26.21	3rd 26.77	5th 26.67	Eliminated (week 10)	
Sabrina Parlatore	4th 20.55	4th 18.75	5th 27.25	4th 66.55	2nd 29.80	4th 96.35	9th 27.53	—N/a	5th 28.46	6th 27.78	5th 28.47	—N/a	5th 26.37	4th 25.82	6th 26.43	Eliminated (week 10)	
Fabiana Karla	2nd 20.90	13th 16.05	4th 28.49	7th 65.44	10th 28.33	7th 93.77	2nd 30.00	—N/a	2nd 29.09	1st 29.46	—	4th 27.47	4th 27.57	6th 22.51	Eliminated (week 9)		
Thiago Fragoso	8th 20.10	5th 18.55	2nd 28.81	2nd 67.46	6th 28.99	2nd 96.46	7th 28.65	—N/a	3rd 28.89	4th 29.21	6th 28.31	—N/a	7th 26.17	Eliminated (week 9)			
Érico Brás	3rd 20.60	14th 15.70	11th 20.87	12th 57.17	11th 24.72	10th 87.89	5th 28.71	—N/a	9th 27.67	7th 27.65	7th 27.67	—N/a	8th 20.10	Eliminated (week 9)			
Alex Escobar	10th 19.70	12th 16.75	12th 20.51	13th 56.93				1st 30.03	7th 28.23	9th 27.32	9th 26.85	Eliminated (week 8)					
Rafael Cortez	11th 19.60	10th 17.20	10th 22.36	10th 59.16	11th 24.72	11th 83.89		2nd 28.44	10th 26.27	10th 27.22	10th 26.53	Eliminated (week 8)					
Marcella Rica	14th 13.90	3rd 19.55	8th 26.16	9th 59.61	9th 28.48	9th 88.10	10th 24.65	—N/a	11th 26.19	11th 26.63	Eliminated (week 7)						
Marcello Melo Jr.	8th 20.10	6th 18.40	13th 19.91	11th 58.41	4th 29.30	12th 83.88		3rd 27.10	12th 22.56	Eliminated (week 6)							
Murilo Rosa	13th 18.3	7th 17.20	14th 17.91	14th 54.56				4th 25.00	Eliminated (week 5)								

== Live show details ==
=== Week 1 ===
Specialists

- Baby do Brasil
- Hamilton de Holanda
- Junior Lima
- Ludmilla
- Nando Reis
- Pretinho da Serrinha
- Samuel Rosa
- Sophia Abrahão
- Tiago Leifert
- Toni Garrido

Act	Order	Song	Scores			Total	Result
Act	Order	Song	Spec.	Studio	Public	Total	Result
Fabiana Karla	1	"Frevo Mulher"	10 (+1)	9.90	None	20.90	None
Eduardo Sterblitch	2	"Me Apaixonei Pela Pessoa Errada"	09 (+1)	9.65	None	19.65	None
Lucio Mauro Filho	3	"Realce"	10 (+1)	9.25	None	20.25	None
Rafael Cortez	4	"Cama e Mesa"	09 (+1)	9.60	None	19.60	None
Mariana Rios	5	"Empire State of Mind"	10 (+1)	10.0	None	21.00	None
Érico Brás	6	"Chantaje"	10 (+1)	9.60	None	20.60	None
Claudio Lins	7	"Dinorah, Dinorah"	10 (+1)	9.40	None	20.40	None
André Frateschi	8	"Can't Buy Me Love"	10 (+1)	9.55	None	20.55	None
Sabrina Parlatore	9	"Preciso Dizer que Te Amo"	10 (+1)	9.55	None	20.55	None
Alex Escobar	10	"É Hoje"	09 (+1)	9.70	None	19.70	None
Marcella Rica	13	"Who Knew"	05 (+0)	8.90	None	13.90	None
Murilo Rosa	12	"Os Amantes"	08 (+1)	9.30	None	18.30	None
Marcelo Mello Jr.	13	"Bang"	10 (+1)	9.10	None	20.10	None
Thiago Fragoso	14	"Podres Poderes"	10 (+1)	9.10	None	20.10	None

=== Week 2 ===
Specialists

- Artur Xexéo
- Liminha
- Lucy Alves
- Paula Toller
- Paulo Ricardo
- Pitty
- Sandra de Sá
- Sidney Magal
- Tony Belloto
- Xande de Pilares

Act	Order	Song	Scores			Total	Result
Act	Order	Song	Spec.	Studio	Public	Total	Result
Eduardo Sterblitch	1	"Eva"	09 (+1)	9.60	None	19.60	None
Lucio Mauro Filho	2	"Come Together"	10 (+1)	8.60	None	19.60	None
Fabiana Karla	3	"Infiel"	08 (+1)	7.05	None	16.05	None
Thiago Fragoso	4	"Locked Out of Heaven"	08 (+1)	9.55	None	18.55	None
Sabrina Parlatore	5	"Mania de Você"	09 (+1)	8.75	None	18.75	None
Marcelo Mello Jr.	6	"Tema de Solteiro"	09 (+1)	8.40	None	18.40	None
Claudio Lins	7	"Corsário"	10 (+1)	6.10	None	17.10	None
Marcella Rica	8	"Blank Space"	10 (+1)	8.55	None	19.55	None
Rafael Cortez	9	"Vestido Azul"	10 (+1)	6.20	None	17.20	None
Érico Brás	10	"Palco"	08 (+1)	6.70	None	15.70	None
Murilo Rosa	11	"Eu Quero Apenas"	09 (+1)	8.35	None	18.35	None
André Frateschi	12	"Vou Deixar"	10 (+1)	6.75	None	17.75	None
Alex Escobar	13	"Conselho"	08 (+1)	7.75	None	16.75	None
Mariana Rios	14	"You Oughta Know"	10 (+1)	7.25	None	18.25	None

=== Week 3 ===
Specialists

- Gaby Amarantos
- João Marcello Bôscoli
- Junior Lima
- Luiza Possi
- Maiara Henrique
- Maraísa Henrique
- Mumuzinho
- Preta Gil
- Tiago Leifert
- Toni Garrido

Act	Order	Song	Scores			Total	Result
Act	Order	Song	Spec.	Studio	Public	Total	Result
Marcella Rica	1	"Máscara"	10 (+1)	8.45	6.71	26.16	Safe
Eduardo Sterblitch	2	"Adoro Amar Você"	10 (+1)	8.65	7.20	26.85	Safe
Lucio Mauro Filho	3	"Não Vou Ficar"	08 (+1)	9.25	7.46	25.71	Safe
Fabiana Karla	4	"Eu Só Quero Um Xodó"	10 (+1)	9.10	8.39	28.49	Safe
Érico Brás	5	"Despacito"	05 (+0)	8.45	7.42	20.87	Safe
Thiago Fragoso	6	"Sugar"	10 (+1)	9.35	8.46	28.81	Safe
Murilo Rosa	7	"Eu Me Rendo"	03 (+0)	8.45	6.46	17.91	Relegated
Sabrina Parlatore	8	"Love Yourself"	09 (+1)	9.50	7.90	27.25	Safe
André Frateschi	9	"Modern Love"	10 (+1)	9.10	8.45	28.55	Safe
Mariana Rios	10	"Que Sorte a Nossa"	10 (+1)	9.65	9.25	29.90	Safe
Rafael Cortez	11	"A Minha Menina"	06 (+0)	8.40	7.96	22.36	Safe
Marcello Melo Jr.	12	"Mandou Bem"	03 (+0)	8.65	8.26	19.91	Safe
Claudio Lins	13	"Fé Cega, Faca Amolada"	06 (+0)	8.25	8.65	22.90	Safe
Alex Escobar	14	"Deixa a Vida Me Levar"	04 (+0)	8.60	7.91	20.51	Relegated

=== Week 4 ===
Specialists

- Baby do Brasil
- Di Ferrero
- Fafá de Belém
- Leila Pinheiro
- Marcelo Serrado
- Paulo Ricardo
- Projota
- Roberta Sá
- Roberto Menescal
- Silvio Essinger

Act	Order	Song	Scores			Total	Result
Act	Order	Song	Spec.	Studio	Public	Total	Result
Érico Brás	1	"Jack Soul Brasileiro"	10 (+1)	9.15	9.15	29.30	Safe
Sabrina Parlatore	2	"Don't Know Why"	10 (+1)	9.40	9.40	29.80	Safe
Rafael Cortez	3	"Zazuera"	08 (+1)	8.55	7.17	24.72	Relegated
Marcella Rica	4	"Use Somebody"	10 (+1)	9.40	8.08	28.48	Safe
Claudio Lins	5	"Fora da Ordem"	10 (+1)	9.25	8.46	28.71	Safe
Fabiana Karla	6	"Anunciação"	09 (+1)	9.55	8.78	28.33	Safe
Lucio Mauro Filho	7	"Epic"	10 (+1)	9.55	8.67	29.22	Safe
Marcello Melo Jr.	8	"A Sombra da Maldade"	08 (+1)	8.75	7.72	25.47	Relegated
Eduardo Sterblitch	9	"Faraó (Divindade do Egito)"	10 (+1)	9.02	8.61	28.81	Safe
André Frateschi	10	"Tempo Perdido"	10 (+1)	9.40	9.12	29.52	Safe
Thiago Fragoso	11	"Amei Te Ver"	10 (+1)	9.40	8.59	28.99	Safe
Mariana Rios	12	"Million Reasons"	10 (+1)	10.0	9.30	30.30	Safe

=== Week 5 ===
Specialists

- Daniel
- João Augusto
- Karol Conká
- Leo Jaime
- Maria Rita
- Martinho da Vila
- Nanda Costa
- Paulinho Moska
- Paulo Miklos
- Roberta Medina

Round 1

Act	Order	Song	Scores			Total	Result
Act	Order	Song	Spec.	Studio	Public	Total	Result
Sabrina Parlatore	1	"Açaí"	10 (+1)	9.10	7.43	27.53	Safe
Eduardo Sterblitch	2	"Pra Sempre Vou Te Amar"	10 (+1)	9.15	8.40	28.55	Safe
Marcella Rica	3	"Iris"	08 (+1)	8.85	6.80	24.65	Safe
Thiago Fragoso	4	"O Que Sobrou Do Céu"	10 (+1)	9.30	8.35	28.65	Safe
Érico Brás	5	"O Descobridor dos Sete Mares"	10 (+1)	9.60	8.11	28.71	Safe
Mariana Rios	6	"Side to Side"	09 (+1)	9.70	9.00	28.70	Safe
Claudio Lins	7	"Expresso 2222"	10 (+1)	9.60	9.09	29.69	Safe
Lucio Mauro Filho	8	"Um Certo Alguém"	10 (+1)	9.20	8.98	29.18	Safe
Fabiana Karla	9	"Like a Prayer"	10 (+1)	9.85	9.15	30.00	Safe
André Frateschi	10	"I Want to Break Free"	10 (+1)	9.85	9.50	30.35	Immunity

Round 2

Act	Order	Song	Scores			Total	Result
Act	Order	Song	Spec.	Studio	Public	Total	Result
Marcello Melo Jr.	1	"Quem Não Quer Sou Eu"	08 (+1)	9.20	8.90	27.10	Safe
Rafael Cortez	2	"De Volta Pro Aconchego"	10 (+1)	9.05	8.39	28.44	Safe
Murilo Rosa	3	"Outra Vez"	08 (+1)	8.90	7.10	25.00	Eliminated
Alex Escobar	4	"Bum Bum Paticumbum Prugurundum"	10 (+1)	9.85	9.18	30.03	Safe

=== Week 6 ===
Specialists

- Danilo Caymmi
- Evandro Mesquita
- João Marcello Bôscoli
- Mariana Aydar
- Michael Sullivan
- Rosemary
- Solange Almeida
- Wanessa Camargo
- Zeca Camargo
- Zizi Possi

Act	Order	Song	Scores			Total	Result
Act	Order	Song	Spec.	Studio	Public	Total	Result
Thiago Fragoso	1	"Do Seu Lado"	10 (+1)	9.65	8.24	28.89	Safe
Érico Brás	2	"Happy"	10 (+1)	9.10	7.57	27.67	Safe
Claudio Lins	3	"Lembra de Mim"	09 (+1)	9.25	8.65	27.90	Safe
Lucio Mauro Filho	4	"Paint It Black"	10 (+1)	9.40	8.05	28.45	Safe
Rafael Cortez	5	"Desde Que o Samba É Samba"	09 (+1)	8.75	7.52	26.27	Safe
Sabrina Parlatore	6	"You Gotta Be"	10 (+1)	9.25	8.21	28.46	Safe
Marcello Melo Jr.	7	"Bom"	06 (+0)	8.65	7.91	22.56	Eliminated
Marcella Rica	8	"Top Top"	10 (+1)	7.85	7.34	26.19	Safe
Mariana Rios	9	"Medo Bobo"	10 (+1)	9.75	9.25	30.00	Immunity
Eduardo Sterblitch	10	"O Tempo Não Para"	10 (+1)	9.00	8.83	28.83	Safe
Alex Escobar	11	"Vou Festejar"	10 (+1)	8.80	8.43	28.23	Safe
Fabiana Karla	12	"Loka"	10 (+1)	9.30	8.79	29.09	Safe
André Frateschi	13	"Meu Erro"	Not scored				Safe

=== Week 7 ===
Specialists

- Bruno Belutti
- Bruno Cardoso
- Fernanda Abreu
- Elba Ramalho
- Marcos Prado
- Monica Iozzi
- Naiara Azevedo
- Rogério Flausino
- Sandy
- Tiago Iorc

Act	Order	Song	Scores			Total	Result
Act	Order	Song	Spec.	Studio	Public	Total	Result
Lucio Mauro Filho	1	"Pretinha"	10 (+1)	8.80	7.55	27.55	Safe
Marcella Rica	2	"Teenage Dream"	10 (+1)	8.25	7.38	26.63	Eliminated
Érico Brás	3	"Pro Dia Nascer Feliz"	10 (+1)	9.10	7.55	27.65	Safe
Sabrina Parlatore	4	"Caso Sério"	10 (+1)	9.20	7.58	27.78	Safe
Rafael Cortez	5	"Galha do Cajueiro"	10 (+1)	8.60	7.62	27.22	Safe
Claudio Lins	6	"Oceano"	10 (+1)	9.20	8.98	29.18	Safe
Thiago Fragoso	7	"The Scientist"	10 (+1)	9.15	9.06	29.21	Safe
Alex Escobar	8	"Foi um Rio Que Passou em Minha Vida"	09 (+1)	9.00	8.32	27.32	Safe
Fabiana Karla	9	"Canta Brasil"	10 (+1)	9.60	8.86	29.46	Immunity
André Frateschi	10	"Ideologia"	10 (+1)	9.20	9.04	29.24	Safe
Eduardo Sterblitch	11	"A Lenda"	10 (+1)	9.15	9.21	29.36	Safe
Mariana Rios	12	"Halo"	Not scored				Safe

=== Week 8 ===
Specialists

- Dennis Carvalho
- George Israel
- Fernando Bonifácio
- Joelma
- Leiloca Neves
- Paulo Lima
- Paulo Ricardo
- Preta Gil
- Rodrigo Suricato
- Sorocaba de Assis

Round 1

Act	Order	Song	Scores			Total	Result
Act	Order	Song	Spec.	Studio	Public	Total	Result
Mariana Rios	1	"I Will Always Love You"	10 (+1)	9.50	8.79	29.29	Qualified
Rafael Cortez	2	"Diz Que Fui Por Aí"	09 (+1)	9.05	7.48	26.53	Eliminated
Thiago Fragoso	3	"Toda Forma de Amor"	10 (+1)	9.20	8.11	28.31	Safe
Lucio Mauro Filho	4	"Hey Joe"	10 (+1)	9.00	7.57	27.57	Safe
Alex Escobar	5	"Coisinha do Pai"	09 (+1)	9.30	7.55	26.85	Eliminated
Érico Brás	6	"Uptown Funk"	10 (+1)	9.40	7.27	27.67	Safe
Sabrina Parlatore	7	"Garota de Ipanema / The Girl from Ipanema"	10 (+1)	9.80	7.67	28.47	Safe
Claudio Lins	8	"Aquele Abraço"	10 (+1)	9.45	8.73	29.18	Qualified
Eduardo Sterblitch	9	"Um Dia de Domingo"	09 (+1)	9.65	8.88	28.53	Safe
André Frateschi	10	"Será"	10 (+1)	9.75	9.09	29.84	Qualified

Round 2

Act	Order	Song	Scores			Total	Result
Act	Order	Song	Spec.	Studio	Public	Total	Result
Fabiana Karla	1	"O Poder do Amor (The Power of Love)"	10 (+1)	9.25	7.22	27.47	Safe
Mariana Rios	2	"Se Deus Me Ouvisse"	09 (+1)	9.45	8.55	28.00	Safe
Claudio Lins	3	"Canto de Ossanha"	10 (+1)	9.00	8.21	28.21	Safe
André Frateschi	4	"Sunday Bloody Sunday"	10 (+1)	9.65	9.15	29.80	Finalist

=== Week 9 ===
Specialists

- Ana Carolina
- César Menotti
- Dinho Ouro Preto
- Elba Ramalho
- Fabiano Silva
- Geraldo Carneiro
- Joanna
- João Barone
- Samuel Rosa
- Tato

Round 1

Act	Order	Song	Scores			Total	Result
Act	Order	Song	Spec.	Studio	Public	Total	Result
Claudio Lins	1	"Volte Para O Seu Lar"	10 (+1)	8.35	8.44	27.79	Qualified
Fabiana Karla	2	"Swing da Cor"	10 (+1)	9.15	7.42	27.57	Qualified
Sabrina Parlatore	3	"Georgia on My Mind"	10 (+1)	8.75	6.62	26.37	Qualified
Érico Brás	4	"Alma de Guerreiro"	07 (+0)	7.30	5.80	20.10	Eliminated
Mariana Rios	5	"Deixo"	10 (+1)	8.35	8.35	27.70	Qualified
Lucio Mauro Filho	6	"Give It Away"	09 (+1)	8.45	7.76	26.21	Qualified
Thiago Fragoso	7	"Thinking Out Loud"	09 (+1)	8.25	7.92	26.17	Eliminated
Eduardo Sterblitch	8	"Evidências"	10 (+1)	8.95	8.64	28.59	Qualified
André Frateschi	9	"Smells Like Teen Spirit"	Not scored				Finalist

Round 2

Act	Order	Song	Scores			Total	Result
Act	Order	Song	Spec.	Studio	Public	Total	Result
Claudio Lins	1	"Tropicana"	10 (+1)	9.05	8.44	28.49	Finalist
Fabiana Karla	2	"Festa do Interior"	07 (+0)	8.35	7.16	22.51	Eliminated
Sabrina Parlatore	3	"Charme do Mundo"	10 (+1)	8.15	6.67	25.82	Finalist
Mariana Rios	4	"Flashdance... What a Feeling"	10 (+1)	8.75	8.61	28.36	Finalist
Lucio Mauro Filho	5	"Se Fosse Pensa"	10 (+1)	8.10	7.67	26.77	Finalist
Eduardo Sterblitch	6	"Carro Velho"	07 (+0)	8.45	8.88	24.33	Finalist

=== Week 10 ===
Specialists

- Ana Carolina
- Bruno Belutti
- Fafá de Belém
- Marcos Prado
- Maria Rita
- Paula Toller
- Paulo Ricardo
- Preta Gil
- Pretinho da Serrinha
- Toni Garrido

Round 1

Act	Order	Song	Scores			Total	Result
Act	Order	Song	Spec.	Studio	Public	Total	Result
Lucio Mauro Filho	1	"I Will Survive"	10 (+1)	9.05	6.62	26.67	Eliminated
Eduardo Sterblitch	2	"Ciclo sem Fim (Circle of Life)"	10 (+1)	9.20	8.14	28.34	Safe
André Frateschi	3	"Hey Jude"	10 (+1)	9.50	8.39	28.89	Safe
Sabrina Parlatore	4	"Easy"	10 (+1)	9.05	6.38	26.43	Eliminated
Mariana Rios	5	"Primeiros Erros"	10 (+1)	8.90	8.35	28.25	Safe
Claudio Lins	6	"Ponteio"	09 (+1)	9.15	8.31	27.43	Safe

Round 2

Act	Order	Song	Scores			Total	Result
Act	Order	Song	Spec.	Studio	Public	Total	Result
Eduardo Sterblitch	1	"Lua de Cristal"	02 (+0)	9.05	8.04	19.09	Eliminated
André Frateschi	2	"Let's Get It On"	10 (+1)	9.70	8.70	29.40	Safe
Mariana Rios	3	"Codinome Beija-Flor"	09 (+1)	8.90	8.34	27.24	Eliminated
Claudio Lins	4	"Meu Bem, Meu Mal"	10 (+1)	8.90	8.32	28.22	Safe

Round 3

Act	Order	Song	Scores			Total	Result
Act	Order	Song	Spec.	Studio	Public	Total	Result
André Frateschi	1	"Under Pressure"	09 (+1)	9.75	9.35	29.10	PopStar
Claudio Lins	2	"Daquilo Que Eu Sei"	10 (+1)	8.50	7.82	27.32	Runner-up

== Ratings and reception ==
=== Brazilian ratings ===
All numbers are in points and provided by Kantar Ibope Media.

Episode	Title	Air date	Timeslot (BRT)	SP viewers (in points)	Source
1	Top 14 (1)	July 9, 2017	Sunday 1:00 p.m.	13.7	
2	Top 14 (2)	July 16, 2017	Sunday 1:00 p.m.	14.2	
3	Top 14 (3)	July 23, 2017	Sunday 1:00 p.m.	13.2	
4	Top 14 (4)	July 30, 2017	Sunday 1:00 p.m.	12.0	
5	Top 14 (5)	August 6, 2017	Sunday 1:00 p.m.	14.6	
6	Top 13	August 13, 2017	Sunday 1:00 p.m.	10.4	
7	Top 12	August 20, 2017	Sunday 1:00 p.m.	16.2	
8	Top 11	August 27, 2017	Sunday 1:00 p.m.	13.1	
9	Top 9	September 3, 2017	Sunday 1:00 p.m.	12.7	
10	Winner announced	September 10, 2017	Sunday 1:00 p.m.	15.1	

- In 2017, each point represents 245.700 households in 15 market cities in Brazil (70.500 households in São Paulo)
