= Thiago Fragoso =

Brazilian actor, voice actor and singer (born 1981)

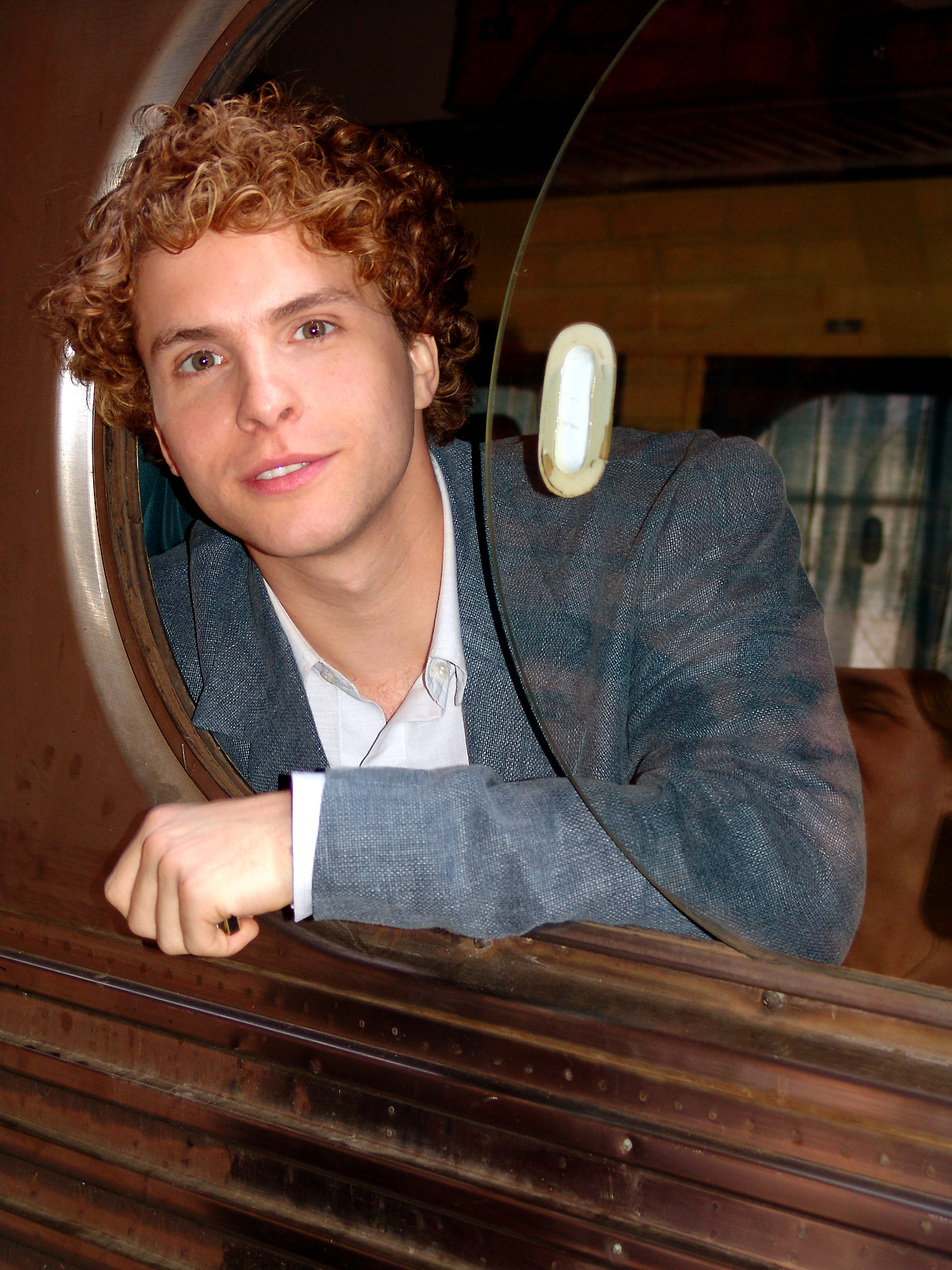
- Thiago in 2006, during the recording of the soap opera O Profeta.
- Born: Thiago Neves Fragoso; November 1, 1981 (age 44); Rio de Janeiro, Brazil
- Occupations: Actor; singer
- Years active: 1994–present

Thiago Neves Fragoso (born November 1, 1981) is a Brazilian actor and singer. He began his theatrical career in 1989, at the age of eight, in an amateur theater group in Tijuca, Rio de Janeiro.

== Early life and education ==
At eleven he began his professional career with the musical Os Sinos da Candelária, based on the massacre of street children in a church in Rio in 1993. He hasn't stopped since.

His training included two theater companies in Rio where he worked with classics from Brazilian and world theater; in 2003 and 2004 he was invited to participate as a guest sketch in the Circuito Carioca de Esquetes; in 2001, a show was selected for the "Fringe" show at the Curitiba Theater Festival; took numerous workshops and training courses in voice, body, interpretation, dance and singing with various professionals such as Amir Haddad, Luis Melo, Leila Mendes, Marilena Bibas, Juliana Carneiro da Cunha, Michel Bercovitch and Felipe Abreu in various institutions such as Uni-Rio, Casa de Arte das Laranjeiras, Studio Escola de Atores, among others.

== Career ==
His debut on television was in the series Confissões de Adolescente, in which he participated playing the character Léo. He then made his debut on Rede Globo, in 1996, playing Carlos Alfredo in Malhação de Verão. In the same year, he was also in the soap opera Perdidos de Amor, on TV Bandeirantes, in which he was Guilherme.

He went on exchange to the United States in 1998 and spent a year in Alabama, where he graduated from Lamar County High School. The actor took American and English literature classes and is still able to recite excerpts from Shakespeare's Macbeth in English. He participated in two plays in a school dramatic arts group and won the "Best Actor of the Year" award at the graduation ceremony. His film debut took place in 2001, with the film A Partilha, based on the work of Miguel Falabella and directed by Daniel Filho.

In 2001 until 2002 he was "Fernando Escobar (Nando)" in the Globo soap opera by Glória Perez "O Clone".

In 2003, lived Estêvão, an officer of the imperial guard who fell in love with Rosário (Mariana Ximenes), niece of Bento Gonçalves (Werner Schünemann) in A Casa das Sete Mulheres. His first television protagonist was in the soap opera O Profeta, on Globo, a remake of the soap opera of the same name, where he played Marcos, a young man with premonitory powers and strong ambition. This character was created by Ivani Ribeiro with another name: Daniel. With this character, he won in the "Best Actor" category at the 2007 Contigo Awards and also won in the "Romantic Couple" category. In 2007 he dubbed the Portuguese version of the character Linguini from the Walt Disney Pictures and Pixar animated film, Ratatouille. He recorded a song and clip for the Brazilian version of the CD/DVD of the soundtrack for the film High School Musical 2, alongside Itauana Ciribelli, which is called "Você é a Música em Mim" (version of "You Are the Music In Me"). The version was so successful that it ended up being rebroadcast on Disney channels around the world.

In 2010, Thiago Fragoso starred in emotional scenes alongside Adriana Esteves in the miniseries Dalva e Herivelto: uma Canção de Amor, where singer Pery Ribeiro, son of Dalva de Oliveira and Herivelto Martins, played. In 2011, Thiago Fragoso played one of the central roles in the 6 pm soap opera, "Araguaia", and before production even ended, he received the invitation to play Márcio Hayalla, one of the protagonists of the soap opera O Astro. In the second half of 2012, the actor played the lawyer Edgar Vieira in Lado a Lado, composing the protagonist quartet of the soap opera together with Marjorie Estiano, Lázaro Ramos and Camila Pitanga. For Edgar's composition, Thiago brushed his hair and frequented English tea houses, so that he could absorb the elegance required of him by the character at the beginning of the 20th century.

A few months after the end of Lado a Lado, Thiago returned to prime time playing the character "Niko" in Amor à Vida. The character was known for performing the first kiss between a male homosexual couple in a Rede Globo soap opera, together with Mateus Solano. In 2014, he was announced alongside Camila Pitanga as the protagonist of Babilônia, playing the role of lawyer Vinícius. In 2016, Fragoso played former volleyball player Caio in Malhação. Still in 2017, he entered the second phase of the 9 o'clock soap opera, O Outro Lado do Paraíso, written by Walcyr Carrasco, to be one of the protagonists.

He was also announced as one of the protagonists of the Brazilian production of the rock opera American Idiot directed by Mauro Mendonça Filho. At his side will be Beto Sargentelli, Nando Brandão and Di Ferrero.

=== Accident ===
On January 28, 2012, Thiago and Danielle Winits suffered an accident during a performance of the musical Xanadu directed by Miguel Falabella, playing in Rio de Janeiro. They suffered a fall of around five meters in height while performing a flight in the musical and the four steel cables that supported them broke. They hit three women in the audience who suffered injuries. Danielle suffered a cut in her mouth and Thiago had multiple fractures in six ribs, lung perforation (hemopneumothorax), laceration of intercostal and paravertebral muscles, laceration of the diaphragm, fracture of a vertebra in the lumbar region, liver injury and internal bleeding.

The actor had to undergo surgery where he received three titanium prostheses in his ribs and had his diaphragm and intercostal muscles reconstituted. At the same time, the actor had been invited to make a special appearance in the last chapters of the soap opera A Vida da Gente as Gabriel, and had even recorded some scenes for the character. However, due to unforeseen circumstances, the actor was replaced by Eriberto Leão, who re-recorded the scenes.

== Personal life ==
He is married to actress Mariana Vaz, with whom he has a son, Benjamin Vaz Fragoso, born on February 1, 2011, the same day as his wife's birthday. During the COVID-19 pandemic, the actor became the father of Martin, on May 2, 2020. He has a band called Poesia de Gaia, of which he is the lead singer. He has a brother called Rodrigo, who is also a singer. His hobbies include swimming, running, bodybuilding, playing video games and watching series on TV. His favorite author is William Shakespeare and he is a Fluminense fan.

== Filmography ==
Television

Year	Title	Role	Notes
1994	Confissões de Adolescente	Léo	Episode: "A Eleição"
1996	Malhação de Verão	Carlos Alfredo	
1996	Perdidos de Amor	Guilherme	
2001	Estrela-Guia	Bernardo Lima	
2001	O Clone	Fernando Escobar (Nando)	
2002	A Turma do Didi	Thiago	Episode: "November 10th"
2003	A Casa das Sete Mulheres	Capitão Estevão Duarte	
2003	Agora É que São Elas	Rodrigo Ramos Zabelheira de Sá	
2003	Especial Chico Anysio	Reporter	Episode: "May 4th"
2003	Sexo Frágil	Soraya / Ana Paula	Episode: "Já Não Somos os Mesmos"
2004	Senhora do Destino	Alberto Pedreira	
2005	Sítio do Picapau Amarelo	Rabicó (human)	Episodes: "June 1–13"
2006	Dança dos Famosos	Participant	Season 2
2006	O Profeta	Marcos de Oliveira	
2007	Toma Lá, Dá Cá	Ícaro Mojave	Episode: "A Classe Média vai ao Paraíso"
2008	Guerra e Paz	Alcinho	Episode: "Piloto" Episode: "Velozes e Infiéis"
2008	Casos e Acasos	Felipe	Episode: "Piloto"
2008	Casos e Acasos	Cláudio	Episode: "O Desejo Escondido"
2008	Faça Sua História	Thiago	Episode: "Olho de Sogra"
2008	Negócio da China	Diego Dumas Fontanera	
2010	Dalva e Herivelto: uma Canção de Amor	Pery Ribeiro	
2010	Na Forma da Lei	Eduardo Moreno	Episode: "Justiça Tardia"
2010	Araguaia	Vitor Villar	
2011	O Astro	Márcio Hayalla	
2012	Lado a Lado	Edgar Lemos Vieira	
2013	Amor à Vida	Nicolas Corona (Niko)	
2015	Babilônia	Vinícius Teixeira Casagrande	
2016	Malhação: Pro Dia Nascer Feliz	Caio Monteiro	Season 24
2017	Popstar	Participant	Season 1
2017	O Outro Lado do Paraíso	Patrick Junqueira	
2018	Espelho da Vida	Luan Gomes	Episode: "October 12th"
2020	Detetives do Prédio Azul	Gylon	Episode: "Uma Fria"
2020	Salve-se Quem Puder	Alan Máximo	
2022	The Masked Singer Brasil	Participant (Chameleon) / Finalist	Season 2
2022	Cara e Coragem	Himself	Episode: "June 11th"
2022	Travessia	Carlos Henrique Junqueira (Caíque)	
2023	Compro Likes	Brendon	

=== Cinema ===
Year	Title	Role	Notes
2001	A Partilha	Maurício	
2002	Xuxa e os Duendes 2 – No Caminho das Fadas	Elf Dáfnis	
2003	Foliar Brasil	Lucas Ajuricaba	
2004	Um Show de Verão	Fred	
2006	Irma Vap – O Retorno	Leonardo Aguiar	
2006	Trair e Coçar É Só Começar	Carlos Alberto	
2007	Caixa Dois	Henrique	
2007	Ratatouille	Alfredo Linguini (voice)	Brazilian dubbing
2009	Ouro Negro – A Saga do Petróleo Brasileiro	Pedro Gosch	
2011	Mentiras Sinceras		
2012	Rise of the Guardians	Jack Frost (voice)	Brazilian dubbing
2013	A Primeira Noite do Resto de Nossas Vidas	Pedro	Short film
2017	Doidas e Santas	Alex	
2019	O Galã	Júlio Bastos	
2023	Medusa	Pastor Guilherme	
2024	Kali	Junior	

== Discography ==
Album appearances
Year	Title	Other artists	Album
2007	"Você é a Música em Mim"	Itauana Ciribelli	High School Musical 2

Single
Year	Title	Music Video	Album
2019	"Recomeço"	T/N	Added to no album

== Stage ==
Year	Title	Role
1994	Os Sinos da Candelária	Russinho
1998	Romeu e Julieta	Romeu
1999	Poemas com Problemas	burglar
2000	O Último Suspiro da Palmeira	Tiago
2000	O Beijo no Asfalto	Werneck
2001	Paixão Cheia de Nós	Hacker
2001	O Despertar da Primavera	Melchior Gabor
2003	Eu, Você e Ninguém	João
2003	Repersolos	Man
2004	A Missão Secreta de Tom Rilver	Tom Rilver
2005	Veneza	Tonho
2006	Como o Diabo Gosta	Tulipa
2007	Sua Excelência, o Candidato	Orlando
2009	Rock N'Roll	Jan
2010	Mente Mentira – A Lie of the Mind	Frankie
2012	Xanadu	Sonny Malone
2016	As Benevolentes – Uma Anatomia do Mal	Maximillian Aue
2016	Garota de Ipanema – O Amor é Bossa	Zeca

== Awards and nominations ==
Year	Award	Category	Work nominated	Result
2002	Prêmio Austregésilo de Athayde	Best New Actor	O Clone	Won
2004	Prêmio Contigo! de TV	Best Romantic Couple (with Mariana Ximenes)	A Casa das Sete Mulheres	Nominated
2007	Prêmio Contigo! de TV	Best Romantic Couple (with Paolla Oliveira)	O Profeta	Won
2007	Prêmio Contigo! de TV	Best Actor	O Profeta	Nominated
2010	Prêmio Qualidade Brasil	Best Supporting Actor in a Miniseries	Dalva e Herivelto: uma Canção de Amor	Nominated
2012	Prêmio Quem de Televisão	Best Actor	Lado a Lado	Nominated
2013	Prêmio Extra de Televisão	Best Actor	Lado a Lado	Nominated
2013	Prêmio Contigo! de TV	Best Actor	Lado a Lado	Nominated
2013	Melhores do Ano	Best Supporting Actor	Amor à Vida	Won
2014	Prêmio Contigo! de TV	Best Supporting Actor	Amor à Vida	Won
2016	Prêmio Geração Glamour	Guapo of the Year	Himself	Won
2016	Prêmio Aplauso Brasil	Best Actor	As Benevolentes – Uma Anatomia do Mal	Nominated
2021	Festival do Rio	Best Supporting Actor	Medusa	Nominated
