= A Casa das Sete Mulheres =

Brazilian television miniseries

- Also known as: Seven Women
- Created by: Maria Adelaide Amaral and Walter Negrão, based on the work of the same name Letícia Wierzchowski
- Starring: Camila Morgado; Thiago Lacerda; Giovanna Antonelli; Eliane Giardini; Werner Schünemann; Nívea Maria; Bete Mendes; Luís Melo; Daniela Escobar; Marcello Novaes; Mariana Ximenes; Thiago Fragoso; Samara Felippo; Heitor Martinez; Tarcísio Filho; Dalton Vigh; Jandira Martini; Murilo Rosa; Ana Beatriz Nogueira
- Country of origin: Brazil
- Original language: Portuguese
- No. of episodes: 53

Original release
- Network: Rede Globo
- Release: January 7 – April 8, 2003

A Casa das Sete Mulheres (English title: Seven Women) is a 2003 Brazilian miniseries.

It was written by Maria Adelaide Amaral and Walther Negrão, with the collaboration of Manfredi and Vincent Lucio Villari, based on the novel of the same name by Brazilian writer Letícia Wierzchowski, and directed by Teresa Lampreia, with the general direction of Jayme Monjardim and Marcos Schechtmann, and direction of core Jayme Monjardim.

The miniseries had Eliane Giardini, Camila Morgado, Samara Felippo, Mariana Ximenes, Daniela Escobar, Nívea Maria and Bete Mendes as the Seven Women, and still Thiago Lacerda, Giovanna Antonelli and Werner Schünemann, as the heroes of the Ragamuffin War, living their characters true figures, which complemented the Country's History, being the same, large national icons.

== Cast ==
Actor	Character
Camila Morgado	Manuela de Paula Ferreira
Thiago Lacerda	Giuseppe Garibaldi
Giovanna Antonelli	Anita Garibaldi
Mariana Ximenes	Rosário
Thiago Fragoso	Estêvão Icaza Sánchez
Werner Schünemann	Bento Gonçalves
Eliane Giardini	Caetana Garcia/Dona Caetana
Nívea Maria	Dona María Gonçalves
Daniela Escobar	Perpétua
Marcello Novaes	Inácio
Samara Felippo	Mariana
Bete Mendes	Dona Ana Joaquina
Tarcísio Filho	General Neto
Murilo Rosa	José de Almeida Corte Real
Dalton Vigh	Luigi Rossetti
Jandira Martini	Dona Antônia
Ângelo Antônio	Tito Lívio Zambeccari
Ana Beatriz Nogueira	Dona Rosa
Zé Victor Castiel	Chico Mascate
Heitor Martinez	João Gutiérrez
Rosi Campos	Consuelo
Maurício Gonçalves	Terêncio
Marcos Barreto	Paulo
Arieta Corrêa	Bárbara
Juliana Paes	Teiniaguá
Dado Dolabella	Bento Gonçalves da Silva Filho
Carla Regina	Tina
Bruno Gagliasso	Caetano Gonçalves da Silva
Amandha Lee	Luzia
Mariah da Penha	Viriata
Mary Sheyla	Beata
André Luiz Miranda	Netinho
Lafayette Galvão	Padre
Carmo Dalla Vecchia	Batista
Fábio Dias	Bilbao
Ricardo Herriot	John Griggs
Oscar Simch	Davi Canabarro
Roberto Bomtempo	Manuel Aguiar
André Mattos	Pedro Boticário
Tarciana Saad	Anahy
Carla Diaz	Angélica
Carlos Machado Filho	Leão Gonçalves da Silva
Sérgio Vieira	Marco Antônio Gonçalves da Silva
Pedro Malta	Marco Antônio Gonçalves da Silva (child)
Lucas Rocha	Leão Gonçalves da Silva (child)
Beatriz Browne	Angélica (child)
Sabrina Greve	Teresa
Theodoro Cochrane	Pedro
Viviane Porto	Zefina
Manuela do Monte	Joana
Christiane Tricerri	Quitéria
Bukassa Kabengele	Zé Pedra
Douglas Simon	Teixeira Nunes/Gavião
Rodrigo Faro	Joaquim (Quincas)
Antônio Pompêo	João Congo
Zé Carlos Machado	Anselmo
Sebastião Vasconcelos	Tio Antônio
Othon Bastos	General Domingos Crescêncio
Ney Latorraca	José de Araújo Ribeiro
Luís Melo	Bento Manuel Ribeiro
José de Abreu	Onofre Pires
Cláudio Corrêa e Castro	Cláudio Gabriel
