= Lado a Lado =

- Genre: Telenovela; Period drama
- Created by: João Ximenes Braga; Claudia Lage
- Directed by: Dennis Carvalho; Vinicíus Coimbra
- Starring: Camila Pitanga; Lázaro Ramos; Marjorie Estiano; Thiago Fragoso; Alessandra Negrini; Patrícia Pillar; Werner Schünemann; Caio Blat; Cássio Gabus Mendes; Christiana Guinle
- Opening theme: "Liberdade! Liberdade! Abra as Asas sobre Nós" by Imperatriz Leopoldinense
- Country of origin: Brazil
- Original language: Portuguese
- No. of episodes: 154 (original run); 105 (international version)

Production
- Production locations: Rio de Janeiro, Brazil
- Camera setup: Multiple-camera setup
- Running time: 35–43 minutes

Original release
- Network: TV Globo
- Release: 10 September 2012 – 8 March 2013

Lado a Lado (Portuguese pronunciation: [ˈladwɐ ˈladu]; Side by Side) is a Brazilian telenovela produced and broadcast by TV Globo from 10 September 2012 to 8 March 2013.

Written by João Ximenes Braga and Claudia Lage, with Chico Soares, Douglas Tourinho, Fernando Rebello, Vellego Jackie, Nina Crintzs and Maria Camargo as co-writers, alongside Gilberto Braga as script advisor. Directed by Dennis Carvalho and Vinicius Coimbra. Starring Camila Pitanga and Marjorie Estiano in the lead roles, alongside Patrícia Pillar, Lázaro Ramos, Thiago Fragoso, Caio Blat, Alessandra Negrini, Sheron Menezzes and Rafael Cardoso in the supporting roles.

The plot revolves around two women from different social classes and race in the early 20th century, shortly after the abolition of slavery in Brazil.

In 2013, the show won the International Emmy Award for Best Telenovela.

== Plot ==
Set in Rio de Janeiro's beginning of the 20th century, Lado a Lado tells the story of a friendship between two women: Isabel (Camila Pitanga), a descendant of a poor slave, and Laura (Marjorie Estiano), a white girl, daughter of a baroness. Despite their very different origins and backgrounds, the two girls become very close while aspiring to a future of equality between men and women, and between black and white people. They meet on their wedding day and build a friendship capable of shaking the tree of Constância (Patrícia Pillar), Laura's mother, a baroness traditionalist.

== Cast ==
Actor	Character
Camila Pitanga	Isabel Nascimento (Isabelle, la Brésilienne)
Marjorie Estiano	Laura Assunção Vieira (journalistic pseudonym: Paulo Lima)
Lázaro Ramos	Zé Maria dos Santos (Zé Navalha)'
Thiago Fragoso	Edgar Lemos Vieira (journalistic pseudonym: Antônio Ferreira)
Patrícia Pillar	Constância Camargo Assunção (Baronesa da Boa Vista)
Alessandra Negrini	Catarina Ribeiro
Sheron Menezzes	Berenice
Zezeh Barbosa	Tia Jurema
Milton Gonçalves	Seu Afonso Nascimento
Rafael Cardoso	Alberto Camargo Assunção Filho (Albertinho)
Caio Blat	Fernando Lemos Vieira
Maria Padilha	Diva Celeste
Maria Clara Gueiros	Neusinha Soares (Jacqueline Duvivier)
Paulo Betti	Mário Cavalcanti
Cássio Gabus Mendes	Bonifácio Vieira
Isabela Garcia	Célia Camargo (Celinha)
Débora Duarte	Eulália Praxedes
Werner Schünemann	Dr. Alberto Assunção

== Soundtrack ==
Two albums with music from the telenovela were released by Som Livre. One containing the national soundtrack, was released in November 2012, and the second one, containing the instrumental soundtrack, was released in February 2013.

== Awards and nominations ==
Date of ceremony	Award	Category	Recipients and nominees	Result
25 November 2013	International Emmy Awards	Telenovela	Lado a Lado	Won
12 November 2013	Prêmio Extra de Televisão	Best Makeup	Lado a Lado	Nominated
12 November 2013	Prêmio Extra de Televisão	Best Supporting Actress	Patrícia Pillar	Nominated
12 November 2013	Prêmio Extra de Televisão	Best Supporting Actor	Lázaro Ramos	Nominated
12 November 2013	Prêmio Extra de Televisão	Best Supporting Actor	Thiago Fragoso	Nominated
12 November 2013	Prêmio Extra de Televisão	Best Costume Design	Beth Filipecki and Renaldo Machado	Won
12 November 2013	Prêmio Extra de Televisão	Best Telemovela	Lado a Lado	Nominated
24 April 2013	Prêmio Camélia da Liberdade	Medium Vehicle	Lado a Lado	Won
17 March 2013	Melhores do Ano - Teledossiê	Best Telenovela	Lado a Lado	Nominated
17 March 2013	Melhores do Ano - Teledossiê	Best Actress	Marjorie Estiano	Nominated
17 March 2013	Melhores do Ano - Teledossiê	Best Actress	Patrícia Pillar	Nominated
17 March 2013	Melhores do Ano - Teledossiê	Best Actor	Thiago Fragoso	Nominated
17 March 2013	Melhores do Ano - Teledossiê	Best Supporting Actress	Isabela Garcia	Nominated
17 March 2013	Melhores do Ano - Teledossiê	Best Supporting Actor	Caio Blat	Nominated
17 March 2013	Melhores do Ano - Teledossiê	Best Kid Actor	Cauê Campos	Won
17 March 2013	Melhores do Ano - Teledossiê	Best Direction	Dennis Carvalho and Vinícius Coimbra	Nominated
17 March 2013	Melhores do Ano - Teledossiê	Best Author	João Ximenes Braga and Cláudia Lage	Nominated
6 December 2012	Prêmio CGP	Best Costume	Beth Filipecki	Won
6 December 2012	Prêmio CGP	Best Scenography	Mario Monteiro and Fabio Rangel	Won
31 December 2012	Prêmio Noveleiros	Best Couple	Edgar and Laura	Won
31 December 2012	Prêmio Noveleiros	Most Jealous Character	Berenice	Won
31 December 2012	Prêmio Noveleiros	Most Jealous Character	Fernando	Nominated
31 December 2012	Prêmio Noveleiros	Best Vilan	Constância	Nominated
31 December 2012	Prêmio Noveleiros	Best Vilan	Catarina	Nominated
31 December 2012	Prêmio Noveleiros	Best Telenovela	Lado a Lado	Nominated
31 December 2012	Prêmio Noveleiros	Best Actress	Patrícia Pillar	Nominated
13 May 2013	Prêmio Contigo! de Televisão	Best Actor	Thiago Fragoso	Nominated
13 May 2013	Prêmio Contigo! de Televisão	Best Actress	Marjorie Estiano	Nominated
13 May 2013	Prêmio Contigo! de Televisão	Best Child Actor	Cauê Campos	Nominated
13 May 2013	Prêmio Contigo! de Televisão	Best Telenovela Author	Claudia Lages and João Ximenes Braga	Nominated
13 May 2013	Prêmio Contigo! de Televisão	Best Telenovela Director	Denis Carvalho and Vinícius Coimbra	Nominated
13 May 2013	Prêmio Contigo! de Televisão	Best Telenovela	Lado a Lado	Nominated
2 December 2013	Retrospectiva UOL	Best Telenovela	Lado a Lado	Nominated
2 December 2013	Retrospectiva UOL	Best Actress	Marjorie Estiano	Nominated
2 December 2013	Retrospectiva UOL	Best Actress	Patrícia Pillar	Nominated
2 December 2013	Retrospectiva UOL	Best Actor	Lázaro Ramos	Nominated
2 December 2013	Retrospectiva UOL	Best Vilan	Constância	Nominated
2 December 2013	Retrospectiva UOL	Best Couple	Isabel e Zé Maria	Nominated
9 December 2013	Diário Gaúcho	Best Telenovela	Lado a Lado	Nominated
9 December 2013	Diário Gaúcho	Best Actor	Thiago Fragoso	Nominated
9 December 2013	Diário Gaúcho	Best Actor	Lázaro Ramos	Nominated
28 December 2012	Melhores de TV Press	Best Author	João Ximenes Braga and Claudia Lages	Won
28 December 2012	Melhores de TV Press	Best Photography	Walter Carvalho	Won
19 March 2013	Prêmio Quem de Televisão	Best Actor	Thiago Fragoso	Nominated
1 February 2013	Prêmio Trans Brasil TV	Best Actress	Marjorie Estiano	Nominated
13 May 2013	Troféu Raça Negra	Best Actress	Zezé Barbosa	Won
9 December 2013	Troféu APCA	Best Actor	Lázaro Ramos	Nominated

== Main themes ==
- Laura (Marjorie Estiano) and Isabel's (Camila Pitanga) story had discussions about sexism, female emancipation and sexual freedom of women.
- Laura and Edgar's (Thiago Fragoso) divorce at the beginning of the twentieth century.
- The drama of illegitimate children, represented by Isabel and Albertinho (Rafael Cardoso), Edgar and Catarina (Alessandra Negrini) and other characters.
- The prejudice suffered by single mothers (as Isabel and Catarina) and divorced women (as Laura), and social and cultural inclusion of lower classes and African descent, as José Maria (Lázaro Ramos) and Isabel, after the end of the slavery and monarchy.
- Sexual harassment and attempted rape of Laura.
- Discussions on religious freedom and inclusion of African-Brazilian culture (samba, capoeira, candomblé), as Tia Jurema (Zezé Barbosa), Isabel and José Maria.
- The admission of Laura in a sanatorium, for being studious and oppositional.
- The origin of soccer in Brazil by the elite, and the exclusion of the lower classes.

== Historical inspirations ==
- Laura was inspired by George Sand, Nísia Floresta and Júlia Lopes de Almeida.
- Isabel was inspired by Josephine Baker.

== International broadcast ==
Lado a Lado was licensed to CCTV. The deal marks a significant move, given the notorious difficulty of market penetration in China for foreign TV productions. It also strengthens Globo's close relationship with CCTV, which previously acquired further Globo programming such as classic telenovela Escrava Isaura and mini-series Mulher.
