= Popstar (TV series) =

- Also known as: PopStar
- Presented by: Taís Araújo; Fernanda Lima; João Côrtes; Tiago Abravanel
- Country of origin: Brazil
- No. of seasons: 3
- No. of episodes: 30

Production
- Running time: 75 minutes

Original release
- Network: Rede Globo
- Release: July 9, 2017 – present

Popstar (stylized PopStar) is a Brazilian daytime live reality television singing competition originally created, produced and aired by Rede Globo. The series premiered on Sunday, July 9, 2017 at 1:00 p.m. / 12:00 p.m. (BRT / AMT).

The show features fourteen celebrity acts singing live in front of the nation and facing a panel of judges, known as Specialists, and the public vote in order to win the grand prize of R$250.000.

Fernanda Lima was the main host for the first season, while actor Tiago Abravanel served as backstage interviewer and social media correspondent from seasons one and two. Fernanda Lima was replaced by Taís Araújo in season two, while João Côrtes replaced Tiago Abravanel in season three.

== Season chronology ==
Season	Number of acts	Number of weeks	Finalists	
Season	Number of acts	Number of weeks	Winner	Runner-up
1	14	10	André Frateschi	Cláudio Lins
2	14	10	Jeniffer Nascimento	João Côrtes
3	13	10	Jakson Follmann	Helga Nemeczyk

== Ratings and reception ==
=== Brazilian ratings ===
All numbers are in points and provided by Kantar Ibope Media.

Season	Timeslot (BRT)	Premiered		Ended		TV season	SP viewers (in points)	Source
Season	Timeslot (BRT)	Date	Viewers (in points)	Date	Viewers (in points)	TV season	SP viewers (in points)	Source
1	Sunday 01:00 pm	July 9, 2017	13.7	September 10, 2017	15.1	2017–18	13.52	
2	Sunday 01:00 pm	September 16, 2018	12.0	November 18, 2018	12.1	2018–19	12.05	
3	Sunday 01:00 pm	October 27, 2019	11.5	December 29, 2019	10.4	2019–20	10.25	

- Each point represents a specific number of households in São Paulo.

2017: 70.500 households
2018: 72.000 households
2019: 73.000 households
