= Letícia Wierzchowski =

Brazilian novelist (born 1972)

Leticia Wierzchowski
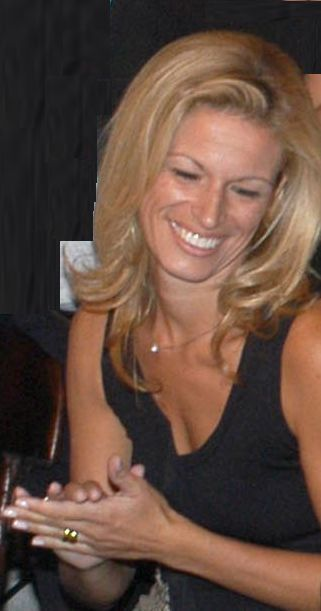
- Born: 4 June 1972 (age 54); Porto Alegre, Brazil
- Occupation: Novelist
- Writing career
- Genres: Historical fiction Children literature
- Notable work: A Casa das Sete Mulheres ("The Seven Women")
- Website: leticiawierzchowski.com.br

Letícia Wierzchowski (born June 4, 1972) is a Brazilian novelist best known for her novels A Casa das Sete Mulheres (House of the Seven Women) and Uma Ponte para Terebin (A Bridge to Terebin). She has written fourteen other novels and children's books.

== Writing ==
Wierzchowski was born at Porto Alegre, Brazil on June 4, 1972, the granddaughter of a Polish migrant. Wierzchowski's writing uses elements drawn from both her European family background and the background of their adopted country.

Many of her works are set in historic times of turmoil, revolution and war. Her best known book, A Casa das Sete Mulheres (House of the Seven Women) deals with the lives and relationships of women from a family whose men were occupied in the uprising Ragamuffin War in the mid 19th century. This novel has been translated into five languages and adapted by TV Globo on a broadcast minisseries aired in 23 countries.

Other writing such as her book of children's tales O dragão de Wawel e outras lendas polonesas (The Wawel Dragon and Other Polish Tales) are drawn directly from her Polish heritage, while the adult novel Uma ponte para Terebin (A Bridge to Terebin) tells the story of her grandfather, Jan Wierzchowski, who emigrated to Brazil in 1936, shortly before the outbreak of World War II.

== List of works ==
=== Novels ===
- Cristal Polônes ("Polish Crystal")
- O Anjo e o Resto de Nós ("The Angel and the Rest of Us") – 1998
- Prata do Tempo ("Time Silvery") – 1999
- eu@teamo.com.br ("I@loveyou.com.br") – 1999
- A Casa das Sete Mulheres ("The Seven Women") – 2002
- O Pintor que Escrevia ("The Painter Who Writes") – 2003
- Um Farol no Pampa ("A Lighthouse on the Pampa") – 2004
- Uma Ponte para Terebin ("A Bridge to Terebin") – 2005
- De um Grande Amor e uma Perdição Maior Ainda ("A Great Love and A Great Doom") – 2007
- Os Aparados – 2009
- Os Getka – 2010
- Neptuno – 2012
- Sal – 2013

=== Children books ===
- O Dragão de Wawel e outras lendas polonesas ("The Wawel Dragon and other Polish legends") – 2005
- Todas as Coisas querem ser Outras Coisas ("All the Things who want to be Other Things") – 2006
- O Menino Paciente ("The Patient Boy") – 2007
- Era uma Vez um Gato Xadrez ("Once there was a Checkered Cat") – 2008
