= Werner Schünemann =

Brazilian actor and film director

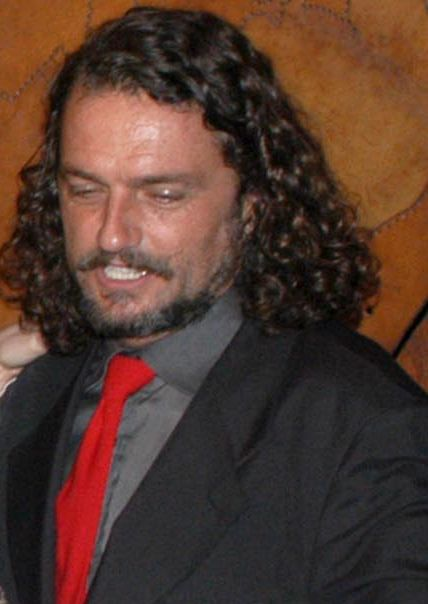
- Schünemann at the Gramado Film Festival in 2005
- Born: Werner Eduardo Schünemann; February 21, 1959 (age 67); Porto Alegre, Rio Grande do Sul, Brazil
- Education: Federal University of Rio Grande do Sul
- Occupations: Actor, director, screenwriter
- Years active: 1979–present
- Spouse: Tânia Oliveira (m. 1993; div. 2015)
- Children: 2

Werner Eduardo Schünemann (born February 21, 1959) is a Brazilian actor, director, and screenwriter.

== Biography ==
Schünemann was born in Porto Alegre, the grandson of Germans. He was raised near Novo Hamburgo and began acting at age 15. Schünemann earned a history degree at the Federal University of Rio Grande do Sul.

Werner was founder of the Casa de Cinema in Porto Alegre.

He also worked as director of publicity and political campaigns for television.

== Selected filmography ==
Television and film
Year	Title	Role	Notes
2019	Éramos Seis	Jorge Assad	
2017	Tempo de Amar	Coronel Francisco Alcino	
2016	Haja Coração	Guido Di Marino	
2012	Lado a Lado	Dr. Alberto Assunção	
2012	As Brasileiras	Alberto Galledo	Episode: "A Fofoqueira de Porto Alegre"
2010	Astral City: A Spiritual Journey	Emmanuel	
2010	Passione	Saulo Gouveia	
2008	Duas Caras	Humberto Silveira	
2008	Beleza Pura	Tomás Fonseca Guimarães	
2007	Eterna Magia	Maximillian "Max" Sullivan	
2005	América		
2004	Começar de Novo	Anselmo Pessoa	
2004	Olga	Arthur Ewert	
2004	Almost Brothers	Miguel	
2003	Kubanacan	Alejandro Rivera	
2003	A Casa das Sete Mulheres	Bento Gonçalves da Silva	
2000	Tolerance	Juvenal	
