= Marcos & Belutti =

Brazilian singing duo

- Origin: São Paulo, São Paulo, Brazil
- Genres: Sertanejo
- Labels: EMI (2008-2010); Som Livre (2011-2016); Sony Music (2017-present)
- Members: Leonardo Prado de Souza (Marcos); Bruno Belucci Pereira (Belutti)
- Website: www.marcosebelutti.com.br

Marcos & Belutti or Marcos e Belutti is a Brazilian sertanejo duo formed in 2007, made up of Leonardo Prado de Souza, also known as Marcos (born Santo André, on 29 August 1983), and Bruno Belucci Pereira, also known as Belutti (born in São Paulo on 7 November 1981).

== Discography ==
=== Albums ===
Studio albums

- 2010: Nosso Lugar
- 2012: Cores
- 2017: Acredite

Live albums

- 2009: Ao Vivo
- 2011: Sem Me Controlar - Ao Vivo
- 2014: Acústico
- 2015: Acústico Tão Feliz
- 2018: M&B - 10 Anos
- 2019: Presente
- 2020: Cumpra-se

=== DVDs ===
- 2008: Ao Vivo
- 2011: Sem Me Controlar - Ao Vivo
- 2014: Acústico
- 2015: Acústico Tão Feliz
- 2018: M&B - 10 Anos
- 2019: Presente

=== EPs ===
- 2018: 10 Anos

=== Singles ===
Year	Title	Peak position	Album
2009	"Tudo no Olhar"	12	Marcos & Belutti - Ao Vivo
2009	"Perdoa Amor"	32	Marcos & Belutti - Ao Vivo
2009	"Silêncio"	19	—
2010	"Você Não Me Faz Bem"	20	Marcos & Belutti - Ao Vivo
2010	"Será Que Vai Rolar?"	34	Nosso Lugar
2010	"Sem Me Controlar"	7	Nosso Lugar
2011	"Dupla Solidão"	14	Sem Me Controlar - Ao Vivo
2011	"Nova Namorada"	12	Sem Me Controlar - Ao Vivo
2011	"Desce do Salto" (feat. Michel Teló)	15	Sem Me Controlar - Ao Vivo
2012	"Amor Pra Vida Inteira"	39	Sem Me Controlar - Ao Vivo
2012	"I Love You"	12	Cores
2012	"Amor de Madrugada"	26	Cores
2013	"Calma Aí" (feat. Fernando & Sorocaba)	59	—
2013	"Irracional"	78	Acústico
2013	"Mentirosa"	18	Acústico
2014	"Domingo de Manhã"	2	Acústico
2014	"Então Foge"	2	Acústico Tão Feliz
2015	"Poeira da Lua"	3	Acústico Tão Feliz
2015	"Aquele 1%" (feat. Wesley Safadão)	1	Acústico Tão Feliz
2016	"Romântico Anônimo" (feat. Fernando Zor)	1	Acústico Tão Feliz
2016	"Tão Feliz"	1	Acústico Tão Feliz
2016	"Solteiro Apaixonado"	1	Acredite
2017	"Eu Era"	1	Acredite
2017	"Mais Um Ano Juntos"	4	Acredite
2018	"Cancela o Sentimento" (Part. Marília Mendonça)	3	10 Anos - Ao Vivo
2018	"Siga a Seta" (part. Matheus & Kauan)	4	10 Anos - Ao Vivo
2019	"Tonelada de Solidão" (part. Ferrugem)	5	10 Anos - Ao Vivo
2019	"Não Planeje Nada"	3	Presente
2020	"@Isa"	14	Cumpra-se

Promotional singles

Year	Title	Album
2009	"Como Um Beijo (Heaven)"	—
2010	"Tô no Buteco"	Nosso Lugar
2011	"Cartas"	Sem Me Controlar - Ao Vivo
2011	"Fique com Meu Travesseiro"	Sem Me Controlar - Ao Vivo
2012	"3, 2, 1"	Cores
2012	"Saudade (Amor de Deus)"	Cores
2015	"Queda Livre"	Acústico Tão Feliz
2017	"Disk Amor"	Acredite
2017	"O Palhaço"	Acredite
2018	"Troca de Favor"	10 Anos - Ao Vivo
2018	"100% Nem Aí"	10 Anos - Ao Vivo
