= Sandra de Sá =

Brazilian singer and songwriter (born 1955)

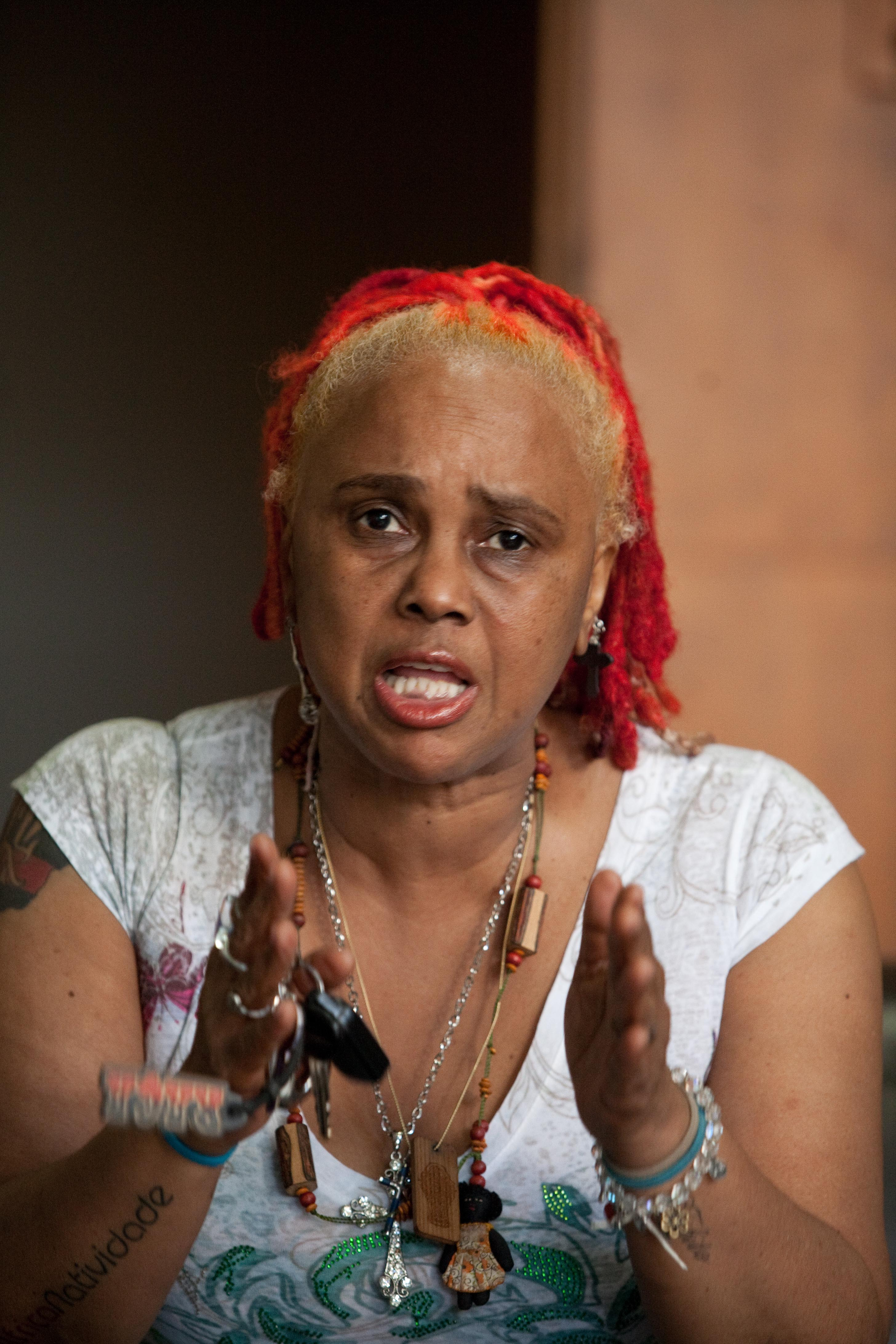
- Sandra de Sá in 2010

Background information
- Born: Sandra Cristina Frederico de Sá; August 27, 1955 (age 70)
- Origin: Rio de Janeiro, Rio de Janeiro, Brazil
- Genres: MPB, samba rock, black music, soul, samba, pop, jazz, break, funk, rhythm and blues, ballad
- Occupations: Singer and songwriter
- Instruments: Vocals, acoustic guitar
- Years active: 1980–present
- Labels: RGE Discos, WEA, RCA Victor, BMG Ariola, Warner Music, Universal Music, Som Livre.
- Website: Sandradesa.com.br

Sandra Cristina Frederico de Sá (born August 27, 1955) is a Brazilian singer and songwriter.

Sandra was born in the Pilares neighborhood, in the city of Rio de Janeiro, the daughter of Jurema and Nonô de Sá. Sandra's maternal grandfather, Manoel, was from Cabo Verde.

According to a DNA test, Sandra is 96.7% Black African, 2.1% European, and 1.1% Amerindian.

== Biography and career ==
She was born in the state of Rio de Janeiro, more specifically the peripheric area Pilares, it is claimed that music is part of her genetics, since her dad was a drummer.

Her deep voice comes from her African Descent, being the granddaughter of a Cape Verdean. She has earned multiple awards of the best singer and best song/disc, being considered representative in various musical genres, especially MPB (Brazilian Pop Music) and global black music. Accompanying her father in live shows, in her teenage years, Sandra would participate in folk events of gafieira, samba e soul, in Pilares as well as the area surrounding it.

In 2017, she married composer Simone Floresta. In 2019, she composed a samba-enredo in honor of Elza Soares, composed in partnership with DR Márcio, Igor Vianna, Jefferson Oliveira, Prof. Laranjo, Renan Diniz, Solano Santos, and Telmo Augusto and elected for the 2020 Carnival.

== Discography ==
=== Studio albums ===
- Demônio Colorido RGE Discos (1980)
- Sandra Sá (2) RGE Discos (1982)
- Vale Tudo WEA (1983)
- Sandra Sá (3) WEA (1984)
- Sandra Sá (4) WEA (1985)
- Sandra Sá (5) WEA (1986)
- Sandra! (1990)
- Lucky! (1991)
- D'Sá (1993)
- Olhos Coloridos (1994)
- A Lua Sabe Quem Eu Sou (1997, WEA)
- Eu Sempre Fui Sincero, Você Sabe Muito Bem (1998)
- Momentos que Marcam Demais (2000)
- Pare, Olhe, Escute! (2002, Universal Music)
- AfricaNatividade – Cheiro de Brasil (2010)
- Lado B (2015)

=== Live albums ===
- Música Preta Brasileira (2004)
