= Luiza Possi =

Brazilian pop singer

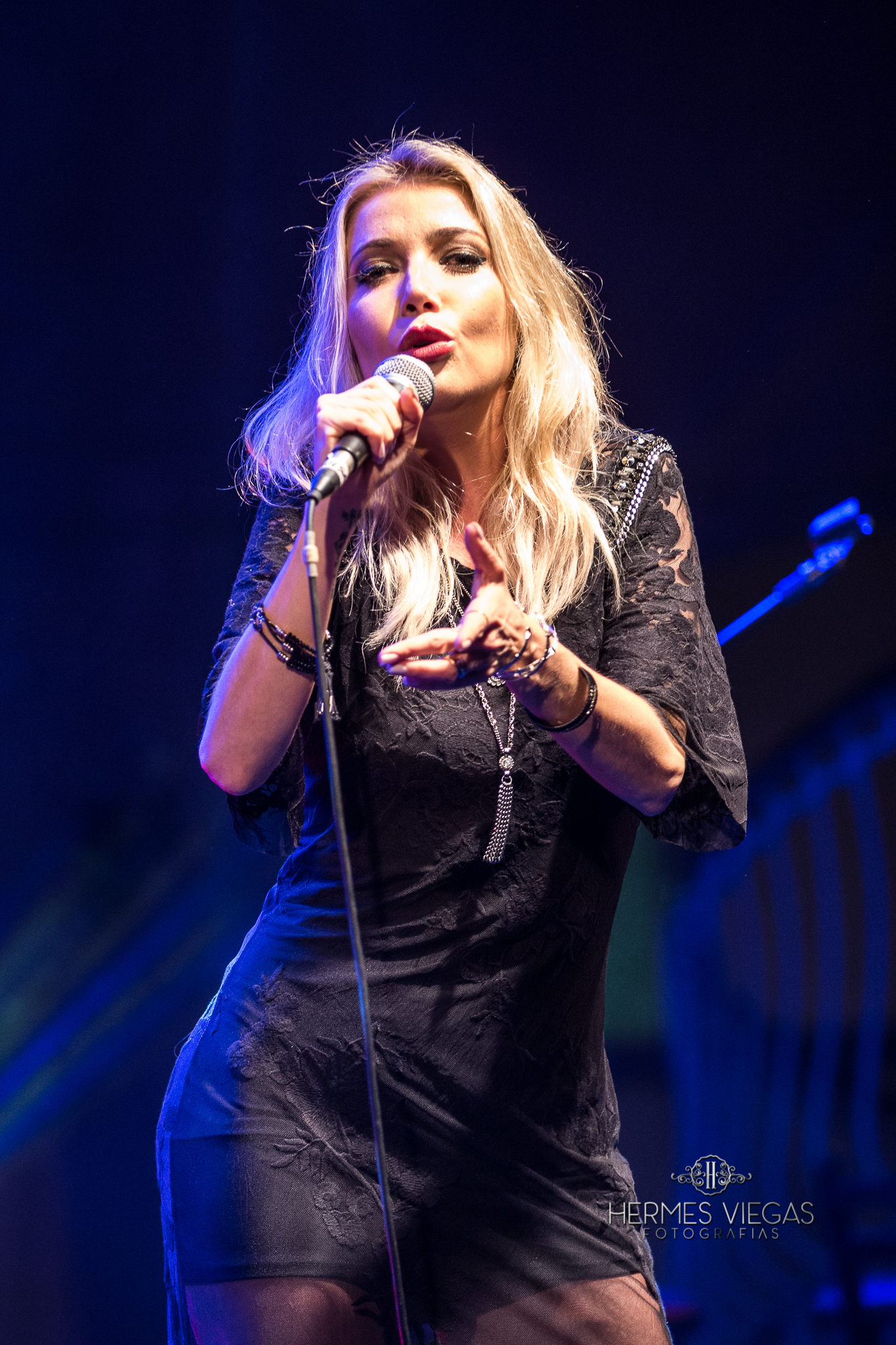
- Possi in Pelotas (2017)

Background information
- Born: June 26, 1984 (age 42); Rio de Janeiro, Rio de Janeiro, Brazil
- Genres: Pop, pop rock, MPB
- Occupations: Singer, actress and songwriter
- Instruments: Vocal, guitar
- Years active: 1999–present
- Labels: Indie Records (2002–2004); LGK Music (2006–)
- Website: Luiza Possi

Luiza Possi Gadelha (born June 26, 1984) is a Brazilian pop singer. She is the daughter of another famous Brazilian singer, Zizi Possi.

== Biography ==
In 1999, Luiza was invited to go on stage and sing a song with a band that was opening a show by Skank at Credicard Hall in São Paulo. The audience consisted of 12 thousand people, and the singer performed the song "O Vento", Jota Quest, backed only by a piano.

In 2001, Possi went with some bands playing in an informal way, until she participated in the Programa do Jô, beside her mother, Zizi Possi, which aired on Rede Globo, and performed the song "Angel" theme from the movie City of Angels. The next day she received multiple invitations to sign music contracts.

Luiza lived with her father, who was then president of Indie Records, and recorded her first album in 2001 under the production of Rick Bonadio. The album took the name of "I'm So" and produced two hits, "Same Day," which was her biggest hit. It was one of the most played in 2002, and the title track from the album is another great success, being subject of the novel Women Love, which was a huge hit with teenagers, and, at the time, the media said it had Luiza in a rivalry with two other pop singers of the time, Sandy and Leah Wanessa. In the same year she made her first national tour, and received several awards, which included the Award Multishow Brazilian Music Singer of Revelation. She became the co-host of Jovens Tardes on the Globo network in 2003.

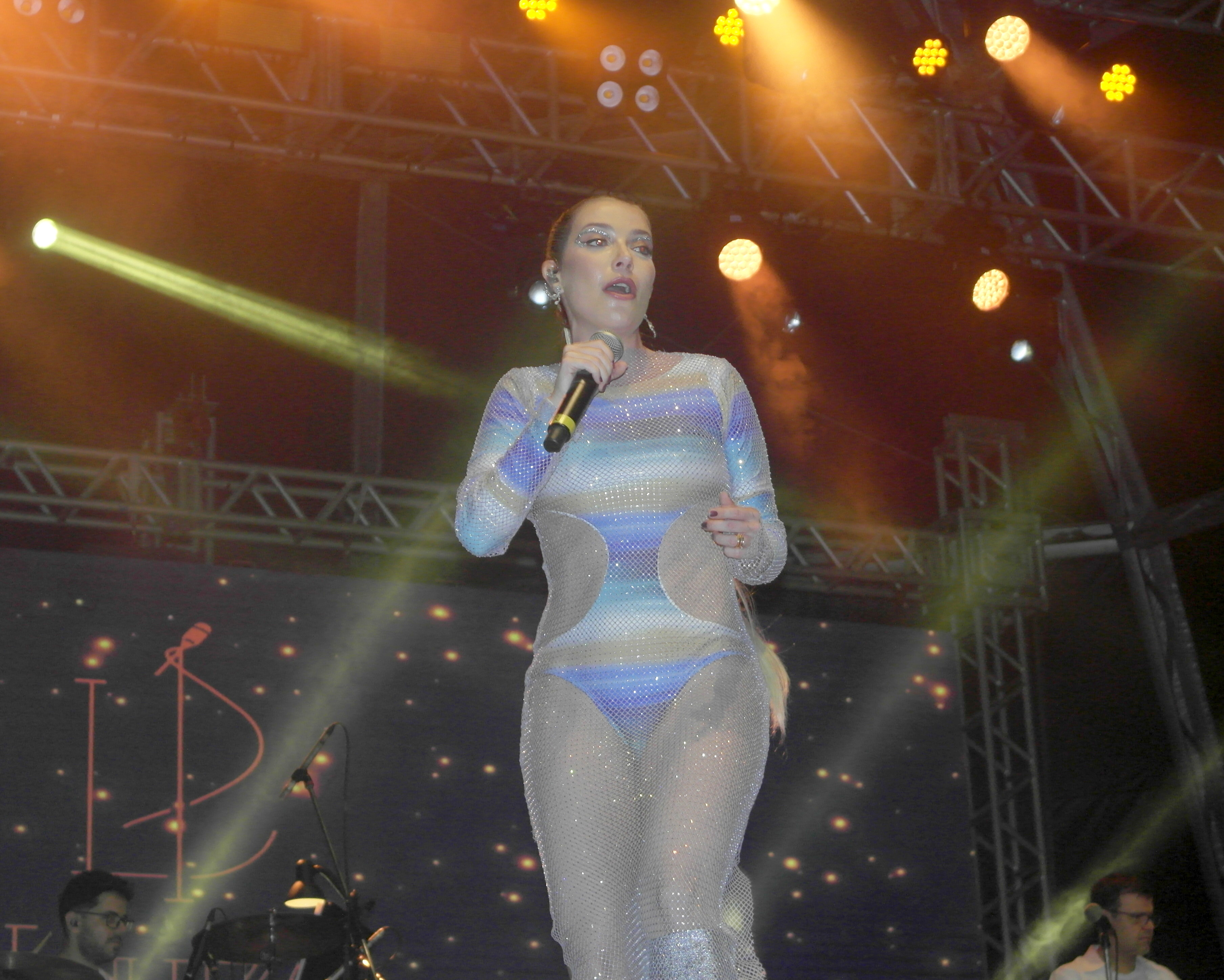
Luiza Possi live in Angra dos Reis (2023)

In 2004, Possi released her second album, entitled "Pro World Bringing" through Indie Records, under the production of Rick Bonadio. The disc Veude sold 10 thousand copies, less than its predecessor, but it produced a hit, "All That Is Good", also the subject of the novel Lady of Destiny's Globe. Her father had a sudden stroke during the release of "All That Is Good," and, following her father's stroke, she decided to not release her second single from the album, her record closed and she cancelled her tour(because of the father). She was on hiatus for two years without work, during which she studied voice and piano.

In late 2005, Luiza received invitations to record a new album and sign major labels in the country, but the record that she did was an album for a teenage audience as in her previous albums, but it hit the foot is turned down several contracts. Possi and her father opened their own label LGK Music, with distribution by EMI / Som Livre. That same year, she released the CD Listening Luiza, in the production of her father, marked the debut of Luiza MPB style centered on the theme of love and critically acclaimed, and considered her best work by launching the first of many watersheds in career of the singer with this album she left the image of teen pop singer, to be become a mature woman of the MPB. He had three hits, "Gandaia Wave / Stone and Sand," "Listen" and "Your Name", the latter two being the subject of novels Globe, Pé na Jaca and Pages of Life respectively, all three made the radios segimento MPB. In the same year Luiza entered the third tour, Listening Tour, with a hundred concerts a year and had a recording of the first DVD, with eleven new tracks is eight tracks taken from their other albums, was recorded in Rio de Janeiro; to release DVD her label released a CD with fifteen songs, and helped make the DVD to be a sales success, with 15 thousand copies sold in the same year. In 2007, the album Listen, earned her her first nominations to the Latin Grammy Awards, the prize more important than the music in three categories: Best New Artist, Best Album and Best Brazilian Contemporary Pop Album of Brazilian popular music, but lost in all three categories.

After promoting her hit record in 2006, she returned with her fifth album, which was more creative, which was dedicated to new songs from pop and MPB: Good Winds Always arrive, is acclaimed by critics and many fans and critics have said, that did not exceed its last studio album. This album, is her copyright and had six tracks signed by her.

In an interview with MTV Brazil, Luiza announced a DVD of her current tour, Weatherlight, which will be released in the near future.

She participated in the first edition of the reality show, Circus of the program Faustão Domingão Faustão, placing 5th.

== Personal life ==
She is the cousin of the famous actress Patricia Pillar and the popular singers Moreno Veloso, Preta Gil, Davi Moraes and Marina Lima.

== Discography ==
=== Studio albums ===
Title	Details
Eu Sou Assim	Released: September 18, 2002; Label: Indie; Format: CD, download digital
Pro Mundo Levar	Released: August 30, 2004; Label: Indie; Format: CD, download digital
Escuta	Released: January 30, 2006; Label: LGK Music; Format: CD, download digital
Bons Ventos Sempre Chegam	Released: May 29, 2009; Label: LGK Music; Format: CD, download digital
Sobre Amor e o Tempo	Released: November 20, 2013; Label: Radar; Format: CD, download digital
LP	Released: March 11, 2016; Label: independent, ONErpm; Format: CD, download digital

=== Live albums ===
Title	Details
A Vida é Mesmo Agora – Ao Vivo	Released: October 1, 2007; Label: LGK Music; Format: CD, DVD, download digital
Seguir Cantando	Released: August 30, 2011; Label: LGK Music; Format: CD, DVD, download digital

=== Compilation albums ===
Title	Details
Momentos	Released: June 12, 2015; Label: LGK Music; Format: CD

=== Singles ===
Year	Single	BRA	Album
2002	"Dias Iguais"	1	Eu Sou Assim
2003	"Eu Sou Assim"	1	Eu Sou Assim
2003	"Tanto Faz"	15	Eu Sou Assim
2003	"Sem Você"	32	Eu Sou Assim
2003	"Além Do Arco-Íris"	14	Chocolate com Pimenta: Soundtrack
2003	"Over The Rainbow"	23	Pro Mundo Levar
2004	"Tudo Que Há de Bom"	3	Pro Mundo Levar
2004	"Sair De Casa"	6	Pro Mundo Levar
2004	"Em Busca Da Felicidade"	55	Pro Mundo Levar
2006	"Gandaia Das Ondas/Pedra e Areia"	42	Escuta
2006	"Um Pequeno Imprevisto"	56	Escuta
2006	"Seu Nome"	88	Escuta
2007	"Escuta"	47	Escuta
2007	"Folhetim"	91	Duas Caras: Soundtrack
2007	"Me Faz Bem"	32	A Vida é Mesmo Agora – Ao Vivo
2008	"Eu, Não"	65	A Vida é Mesmo Agora – Ao Vivo
2008	"Tango De Nanci"	98	A Vida é Mesmo Agora – Ao Vivo
2009	"Tudo Certo"	30	Bons Ventos Sempre Chegam
2009	"Vou Adiante"	25	Bons Ventos Sempre Chegam
2009	"Eu Espero"	59	Bons Ventos Sempre Chegam
2011	"Ainda é Tudo Seu"(ft. Thiaguinho)	40	Seguir Cantando
2013	"Tempo em Movimento"(ft. Lulu Santos)	44	Sobre Amor e o Tempo
2015	"Pra Te Lembrar"	23	Sobre Amor e o Tempo
2016	"Insight"	—	LP
2016	"Aventura"	—	LP

=== DVD ===
Title	Details
A Vida é Mesmo Agora – Ao Vivo	Released: October 1, 2007; Label: LGK Music; Format: CD, DVD, download digital
Seguir Cantando	Released: August 30, 2011; Label: LGK Music; Format: CD, DVD, download digital

=== Soundtrack ===
Year	Song	Album
2002	"Dias iguais "	Marisol
2003	"Eu Sou Assim"	Mulheres Apaixonadas
2003	"Quase Um Segundo"	Jamais Te Esquecerei
2003	"Over The Rainbow"	Chocolate com Pimenta
2003	"Além Do Arco-Íris"	Chocolate com Pimenta
2004	"Tudo que há de bom"	Senhora do Destino
2005	"Em busca da felicidade"	A Lua me Disse
2006	"Seu Nome"	Páginas da Vida
2006	"Escuta"	Pé na Jaca
2006	"Este Seu Olhar" (feat. Osmar Castro Neves)	Casa da Bossa
2007	"Eu Sou Assim"	Amigas e Rivais
2007	"Folhetim"	Duas Caras
2007	"Gandaia das Ondas / Pedra e Areia"	Café Octavio & Nova Brasil FM
2008	"Dias Iguais"	Mulher 2
2008	"Com Lágrimas Na Voz"	Guilherme Vergueiro e Paulinho Lima – Parceria
2008	"Teletema"	Barzinho, Um Violão – Novelas Anos 70

== Tours ==
- 2002: Turnê Eu Sou Assim
- 2004: Turnê Pro Mundo Levar
- 2006: Turnê Escuta
- 2007: Turnê A Vida é Mesmo Agora
- 2009: Turnê Bons Ventos Sempre Chegam
- 2011: Turnê Seguir Cantando
- 2014: Turnê Sobre Amor e o Tempo

== Videography ==
- 2007 – Circo do Faustão
- 2005 – Romeu e Julieta
- 2003 – Jovens Tardes
