= Mariana Aydar =

Brazilian singer of MPB

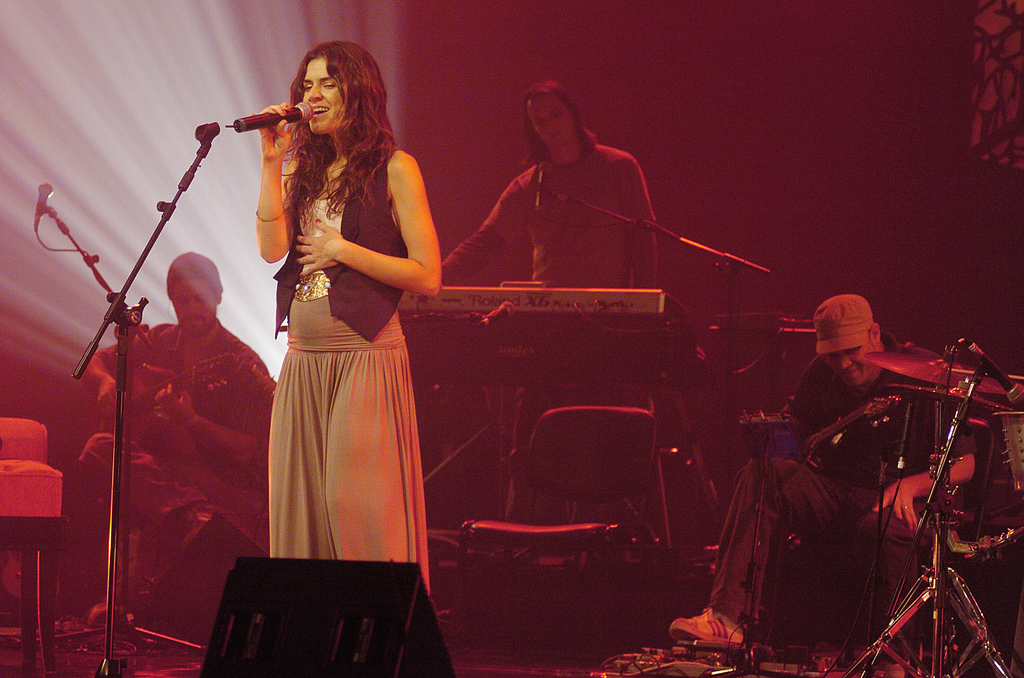
Mariana Aydar in 2007

Mariana Aydar is a Brazilian singer of MPB (Brazilian popular music).

== Biography ==
She was born in São Paulo in 1980 in a family of musicians. Her father, Mário Manga, was a member of the group Premê, and her mother Bia Aydar, was the producer of several Brazilian artists, including Lulu Santos and Luiz Gonzaga. Mariana Aydar spent nine months in Paris in 2004, in order to study music, and met the Brazilian singer Seu Jorge there. She would later sing in the opening acts of Seu Jorge's tour in Europe, in 2015. She is married to multi-instrumentist band player Duani, who is also her producer.

She has been dubbed as the "hottest singer of the moment" by the weekly Veja, one of the main Brazilian newsmagazines.

== Discography ==
=== Albums ===
- 2006 - Kavita 1
- 2009 - Peixes, Pássaros e Pessoa
- 2011 - Cavaleiro Selvagem Aqui Te Sigo
- 2015 - Pedaço Duma Asa
- 2019 - Veia Nordestina
- 2021 - Aqui em Casa, Vol. 1

=== Singles ===
Year	Single	Album
2002	"Lá Vem a Menina" (feat. Carlos Careqa) ^{1}	Ilha Rá-Tim-Bum: Soundtrack
2006	"Deixa o Verão"	Kavita 1
2007	"Zé do Caroço"	Kavita 1
2007	"Na Gangorra"	Kavita 1
2008	"Prainha"	Kavita 1
