= Zizi Possi =

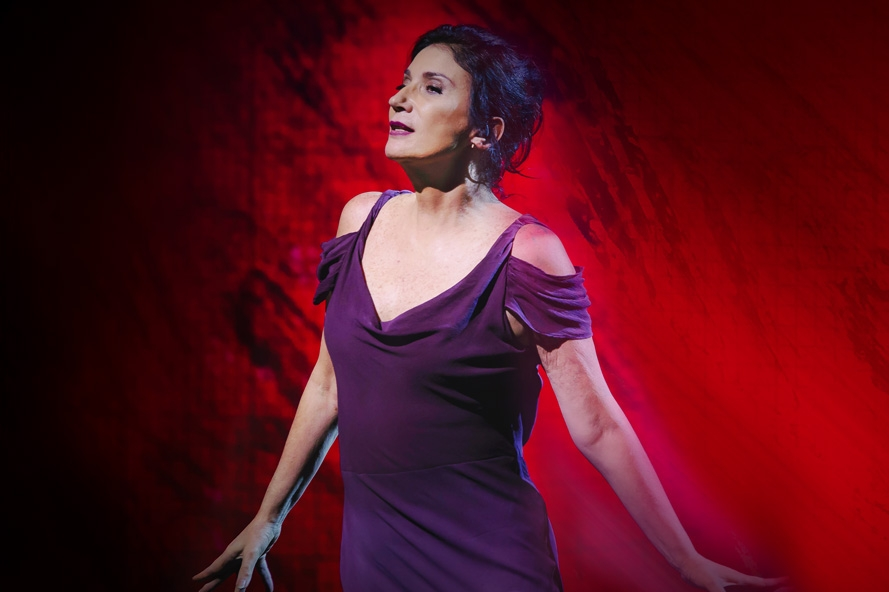
- Zizi Possi in 2018

Background information
- Born: Maria Izildinha Possi; March 28, 1956 (age 70); São Paulo, Brazil
- Genres: MPB, bossa nova
- Years active: 1978–present

Maria Izildinha "Zizi" Possi (Portuguese pronunciation: [ziˈzi ˈpɔsi], born March 28, 1956) is a Brazilian singer from São Paulo, the daughter of Italian immigrants. She sings in Portuguese, English, and Italian. In 2007, she sang at the opening of the Military World Games, alongside Toquinho, Jorge Aragão, Alcione and the Paralamas do Sucesso band.

Possi is openly bisexual. She is the mother of another famous Brazilian singer, Luiza Possi.

== Discography ==
All albums are in Portuguese unless noted otherwise.

- 1978 – Flor do Mal
- 1979 – Pedaço de Mim
- 1980 – Zizi Possi
- 1981 – Um Minuto Além
- 1982 – Asa Morena - Gold (100,000)
- 1983 – Pra Sempre e Mais um Dia
- 1984 – Dê um Rolê
- 1986 – Zizi - Gold (100,000)
- 1987 – Amor e Música
- 1989 – Estrebucha Baby
- 1991 – Sobre Todas as Coisas
- 1993 – Valsa Brasileira
- 1996 – Mais Simples
- 1997 – Per Amore – Italian - 3× Platinum (750,000)
- 1998 – Passione – Italian - Platinum (250,000)
- 1999 – Puro Prazer - Gold (100,000)
- 2001 – Bossa
- 2005 – Pra Inglês Ver... e Ouvir – English – live
- 2014 – Tudo Se Transformou – live

DVDs

- 1998 – Per Amore (initially issued on VHS)
- 2005 – Pra Inglês Ver... e Ouvir
- 2010 – Cantos & Contos, Vol. 1
- 2010 – Cantos & Contos, Vol. 2
