= Latin Grammy Award for Best Portuguese Language Contemporary Pop Album =

Annual music award

- Awarded for: Vocal or instrumental Portuguese Language Contemporary Pop albums containing at least 51% playing time of newly recorded material. For Solo artists, duos or groups.
- Country: United States
- Presented by: The Latin Recording Academy
- First award: 2000
- Currently held by: Anitta for EQUILIBRIVM (2026)
- Website: latingrammy.com

The Latin Grammy Award for Best Portuguese Language Contemporary Pop Album is an honor presented annually at the Latin Grammy Awards, a ceremony that recognizes excellence and creates a wider awareness of cultural diversity and contributions of Latin recording artists in the United States and internationally.

According to the category description guide for the 13th Latin Grammy Awards, the award is for vocal or instrumental Portuguese Language Contemporary Pop albums containing at least 51% playing time of newly recorded material. For Solo artists, duos or groups.

In 2003, Tribalistas by Tribalistas became the first album to win this award and to be nominated for Album of the Year. Portuguese band Ultraleve became the first non-Brazilian act to receive a nomination in this category in 2013. From 2000 to 2015, the award category was presented as Best Brazilian Pop Contemporary Album and was changed to its current name in 2016.

Lenine holds the record of most wins in the category with three, followed by Seu Jorge, Céu and Anavitória with two wins each.

== Recipients ==
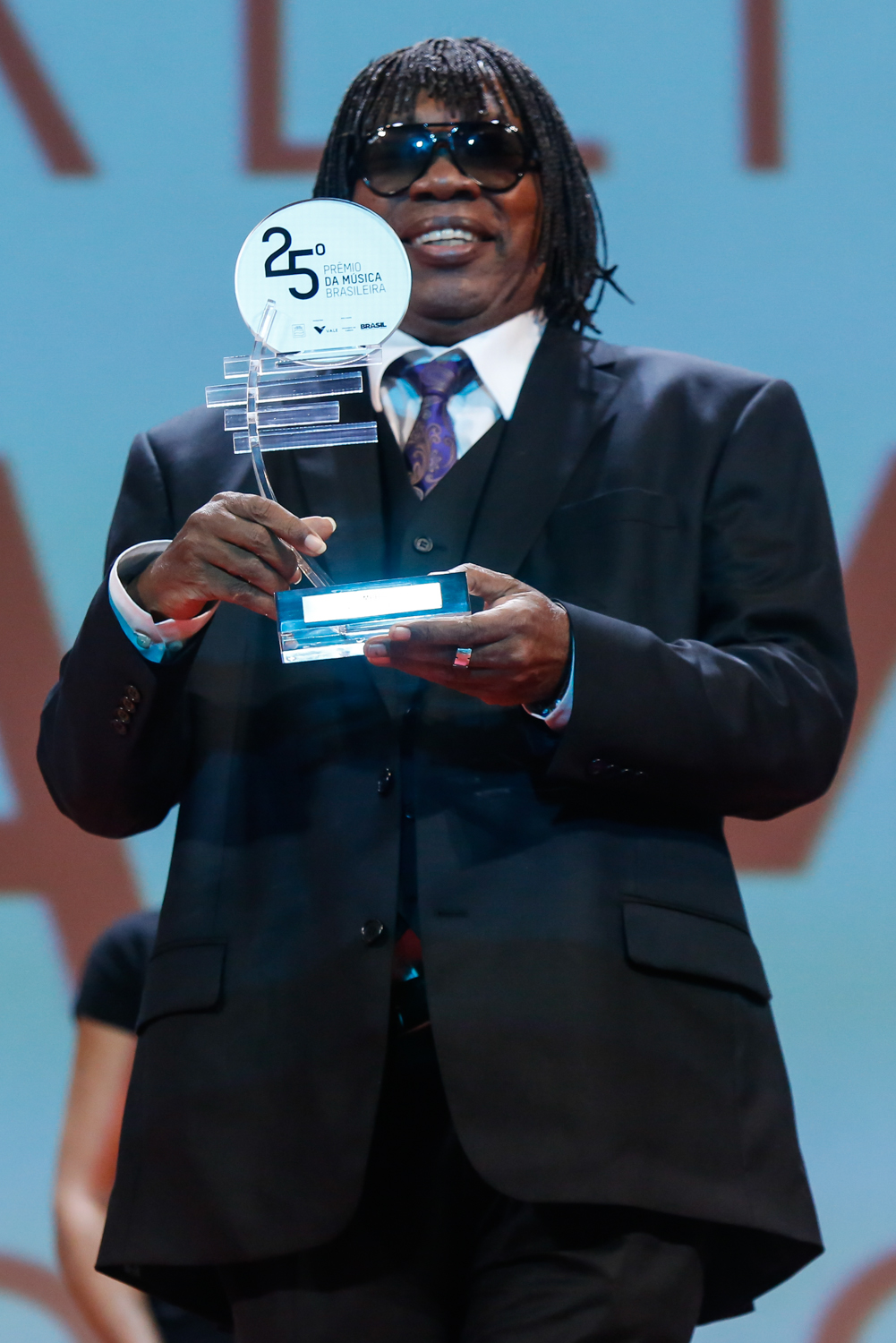
Milton Nascimento was the first winner of this award in 2000 for Crooner.

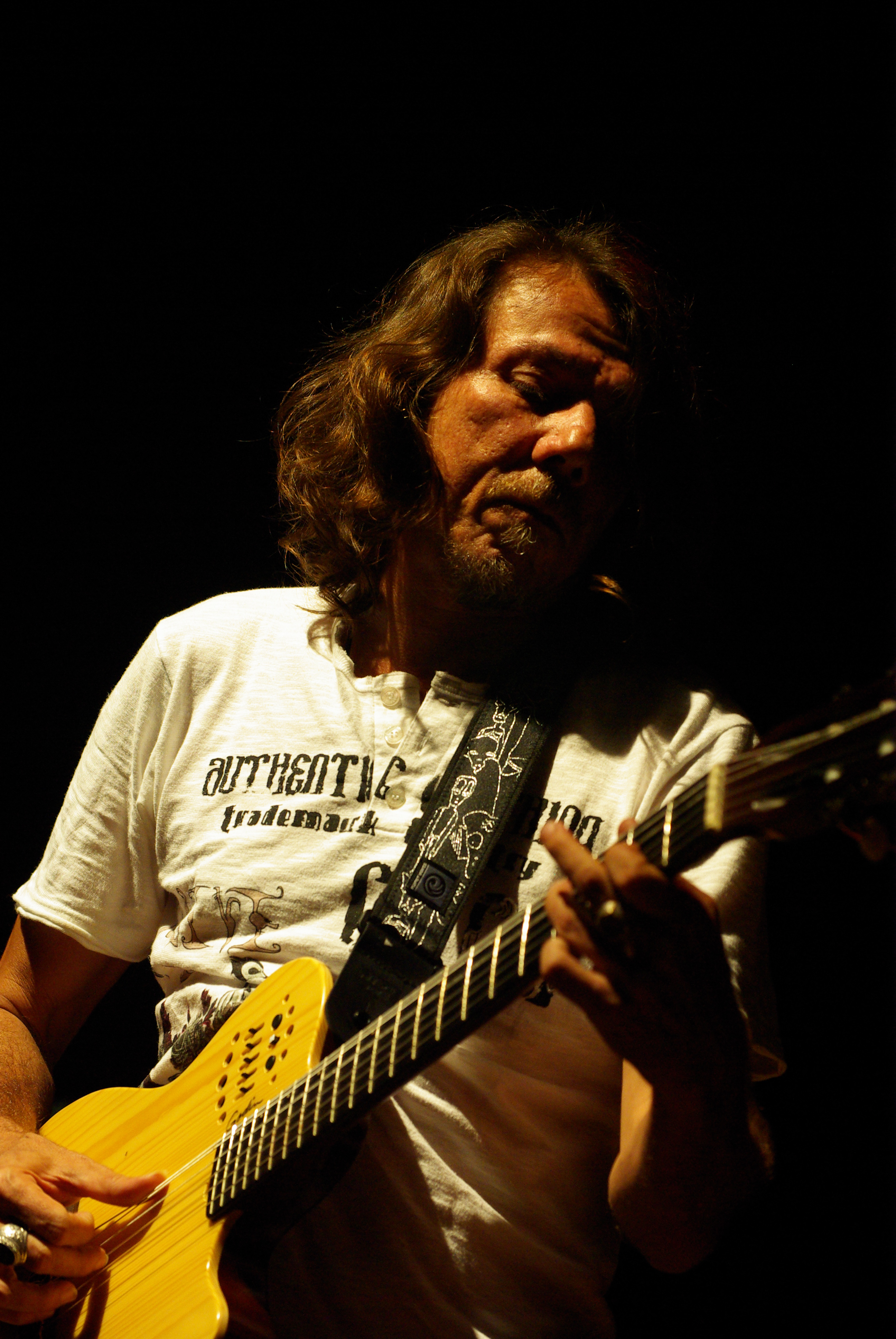
Lenine has won three times, in 2002, 2005 and 2007.

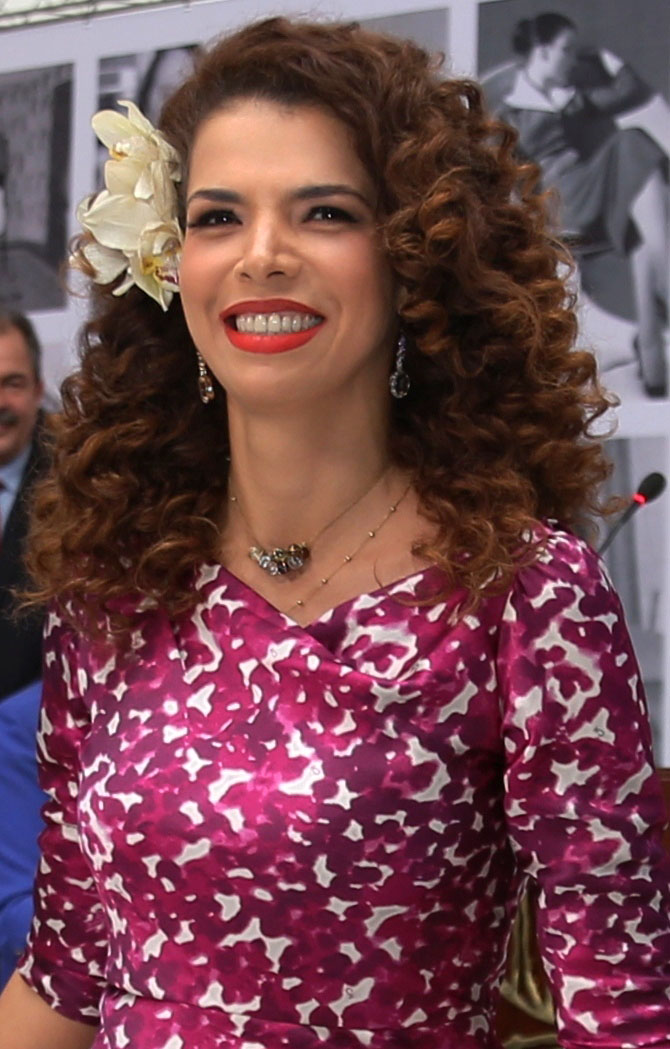
2008 winner Vanessa da Mata.

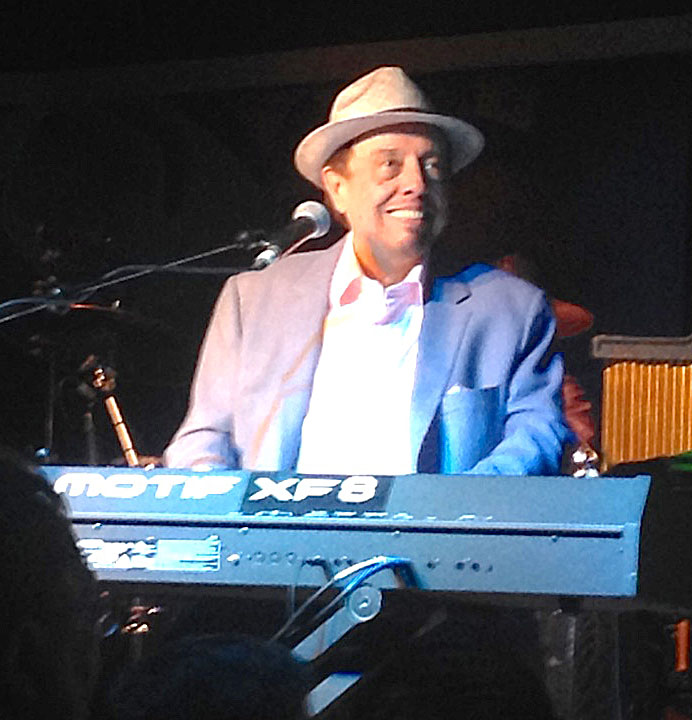
Two-time winner Sérgio Mendes.

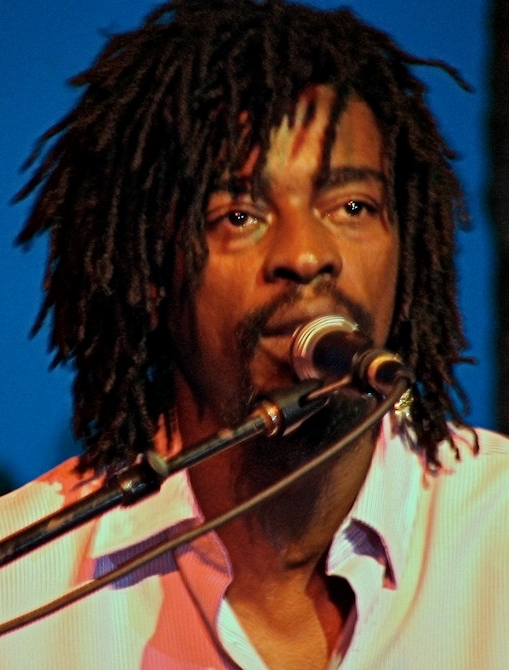
Two-time winner Seu Jorge.

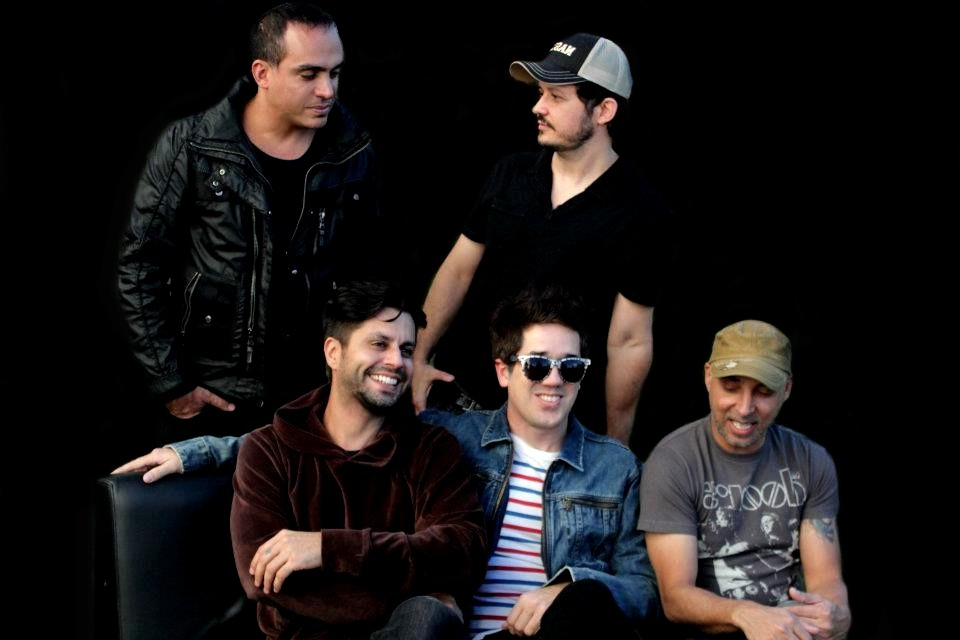
2011 winner Jota Quest.

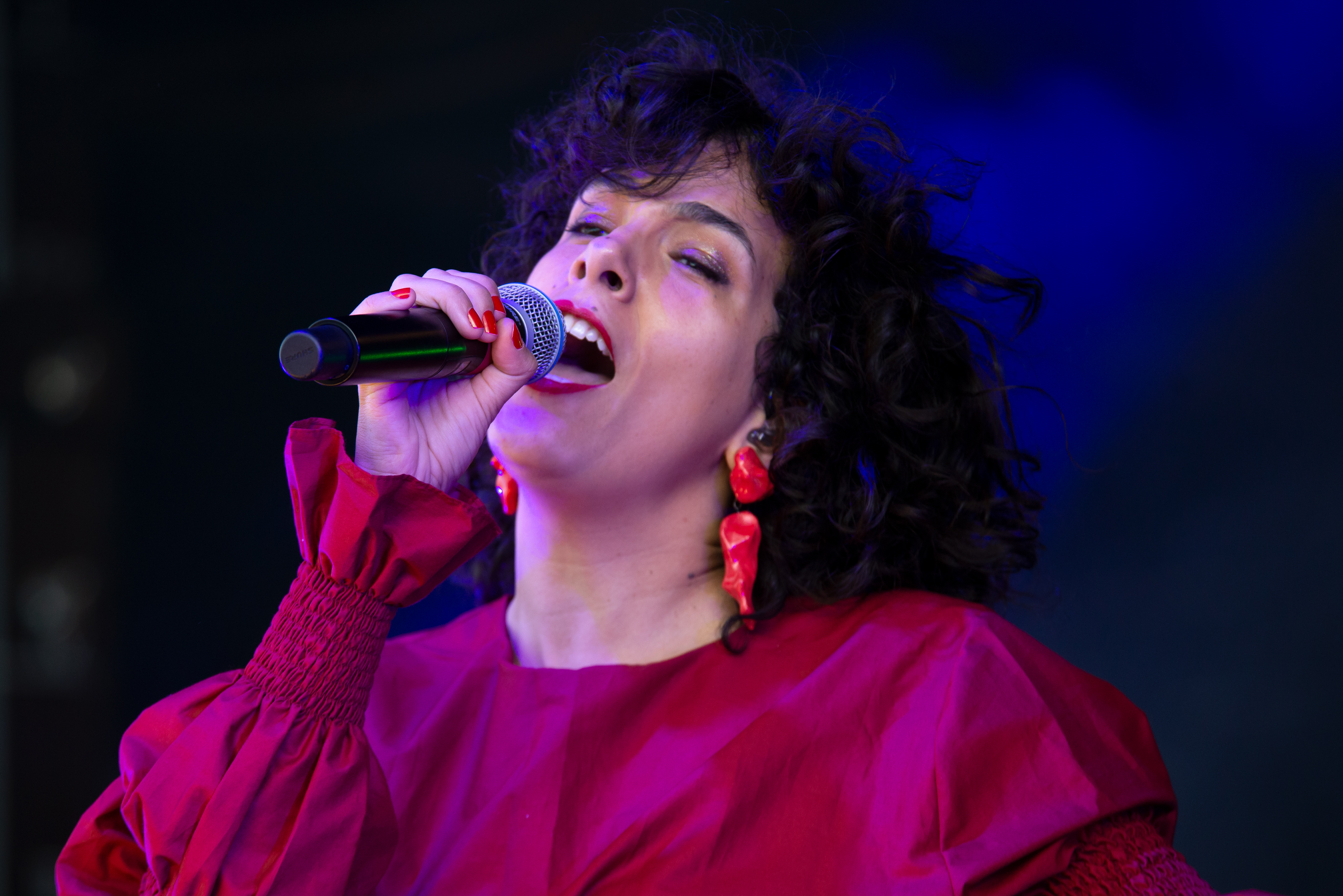
Two-time winner, Céu.

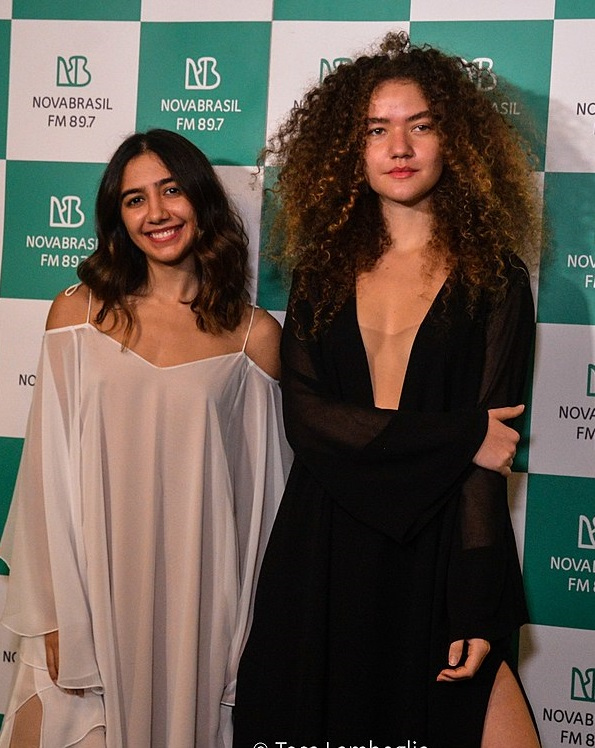
Two-time winners, Anavitória.

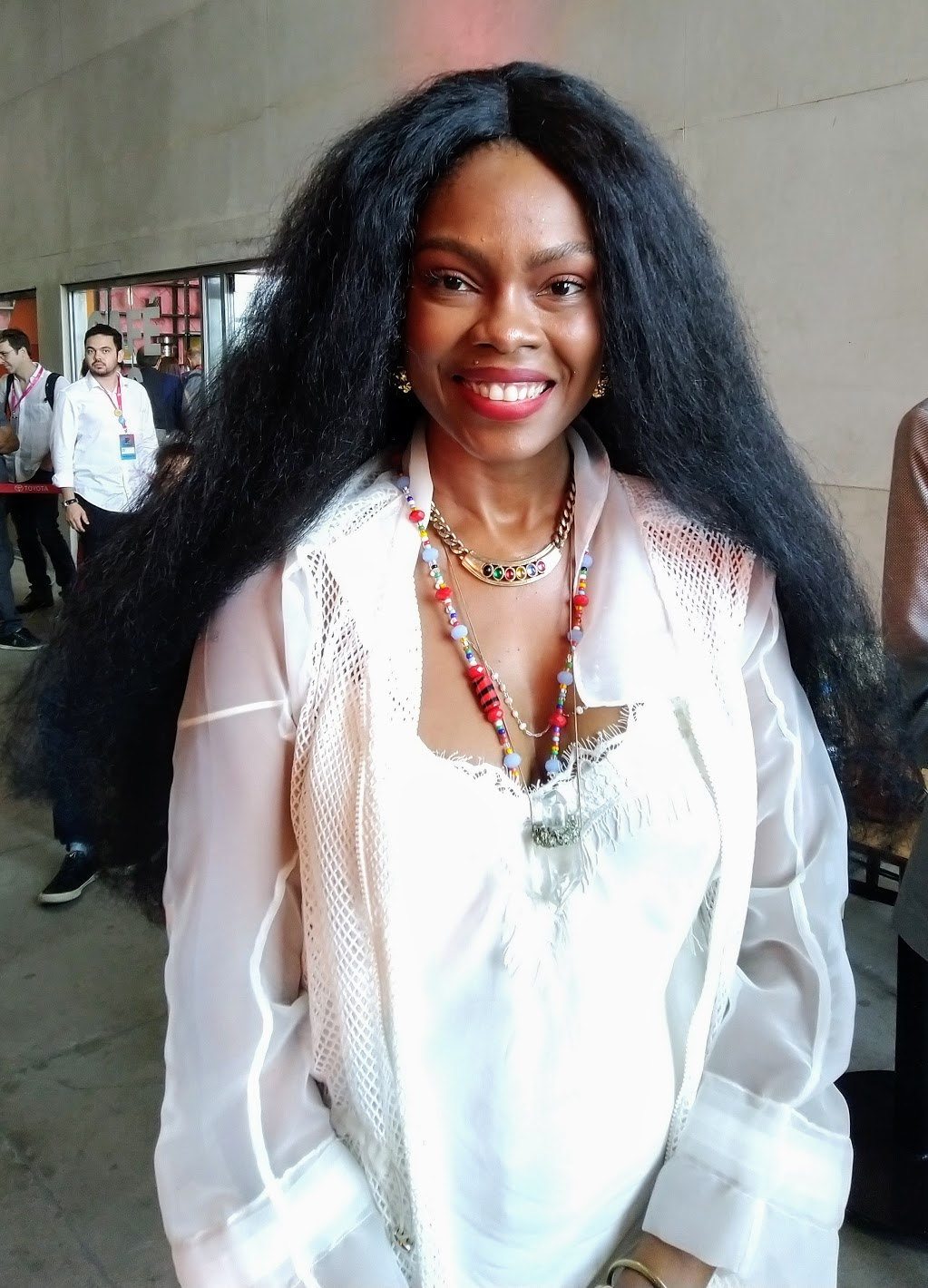
2023 winner, Xênia França.

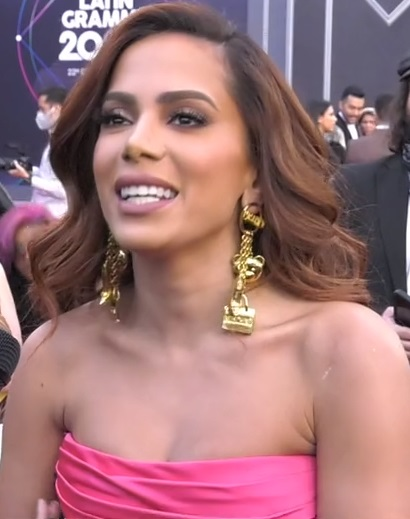
2026 winner, Anitta

=== Best Brazilian Pop Contemporary Album ===
Year	Performing artist(s)	Work	Nominees	Ref.
2000	Milton Nascimento	Crooner	Zeca Baleiro – Vo Imbola; Ana Carolina – Ana Carolina; Zizi Possi – Puro Prazer; Ivete Sangalo – Ivete Sangalo	
2001	Marisa Monte	Memórias, Crônicas, e Declarações de Amor	Zeca Baleiro – Líricas; Pedro Mariano – Voz no Ouvido; Ivete Sangalo – Beat Beleza; Herbert Vianna – O Som Do Sim	
2002	Lenine	Falange Canibal	Bossacucanova & Roberto Menescal – Brasilidade; Zélia Duncan – Sortimento; Otto – Condomblack; Ivete Sangalo – Festa	
2003	Tribalistas	Tribalistas	Gilberto Gil – Kaya N'Gan Daya - Ao Vivo; Kid Abelha – Acústico MTV; Milton Nascimento – Pietá; Caetano Veloso – Live in Bahia	
2004	Carlinhos Brown	Carlinhos Brown Es Carlito Marrón	Roberto Carlos – Pra Sempre; Jota Quest – MTV Ao-Vivo; Rita Lee – Balacobaco; Daniela Mercury – Carnaval Eletrônico; O Esporro O Rappa – O Silêncio Q Precede; Ivete Sangalo – Clube Carnavalesco Inocentes em Progresso	
2005	Lenine	Incité	Carlinhos Brown – El Milagro De Candeal; Rita Lee – MTV Ao Vivo; Tom Zé – Estudando o Pagode	
2006	Sérgio Mendes	Timeless	Jota Quest – Até Onde Vai; Los Hermanos – 4; Margareth Menezes – Pra Você; Marisa Monte – Infinito Particular; Sandy & Junior – Sandy e Junior; Ivete Sangalo – As Super Novas	
2007	Lenine	Acústico MTV	Zeca Baleiro – Baladas Do Asfalto & Outros Blues Ao Vivo; Carlinhos Brown – A Gente Ainda Não Sonhou; Pedro Mariano – Pedro Mariano; Paulo Ricardo – Prisma; Ivete Sangalo – Multishow ao Vivo: Ivete no Maracanã; Skank – Carrossel	
2008	Vanessa da Mata	Sim	Arnaldo Antunes – Ao Vivo No Estúdio; Danni Carlos – Música Nova; Ney Matogrosso – Inflassificáveis; Rosa Passos – Romance	
2009	Roupa Nova	Roupa Nova em Londres	Jota Quest – La Plata; Rita Lee – Multishow Ao Vivo; Ivete Sangalo – Pode Entrar; Skank – Estandarte	
2010	Sérgio Mendes	Bom Tempo	CéU – Vagarosa; Sandra de Sá – AfricaNatividade - Cheiro de Brasil; Claudia Leitte – As Máscaras; Michael Sullivan – Ao Vivo: Na Linha do Tempo Vol. 1	
2011	Jota Quest	Quinze	Arnaldo Antunes – Arnaldo Antunes Ao Vivo Lá Em Casa; Vanessa da Mata – Bicicletas, Bolos e Outras Alegrias; Os Paralamas do Sucesso – Multishow Ao Vivo Paralamas Brasil Afora; Ivete Sangalo – Multishow ao Vivo: Ivete Sangalo no Madison Square Garden; Seu Jorge e Almaz – Seu Jorge e Almaz	
2012	Seu Jorge	Músicas Para Churrascos Vol. 1	Céu – Caravana Sereia Bloom; Zélia Duncan – Pelo Sabor do Gesto - Em Cena; Rita Lee – Reza; Mart'nália – Não Tente Comprender	
2013	Seu Jorge	Músicas Para Churrasco Vol. 1 Ao Vivo	Ed Motta – Aor; Natiruts – Acústico; Adryana Ribeiro – Take It Easy My Brother Jorge; Skank – Ao Vivo: Rock In Rio; Ultraleve – Ultraleve	
2014	Ivete Sangalo	Multishow Ao Vivo – Ivete Sangalo 20 Anos	Marília Bessy & Ney Matogrosso – Infernynho - Marília Bessy Convida Ney Matogrosso; Ana Carolina – #AC; Vanessa da Mata – Segue o Som; Jota Quest – Funky Funky Boom Boom	
2015	Tulipa Ruiz	Dancê	Jamz – Insano; Seu Jorge – Músicas para Churrasco, Vol. 2; Onze:20 – Vida Loka; Jonas Sá – Blam! Blam!	

=== Best Portuguese Language Contemporary Pop Album ===
Year	Performing artist(s)	Work	Nominees	Ref.
2016	Céu	Tropix	Tiago Iorc – Troco Likes; Larissa Luz – Território Conquistado; Mariza – Mundo; Thiago Ramil – Leve Embora	
2017	Tiago Iorc	Troco Likes Ao Vivo	Anavitória – Anavitória; Mano Brown – Boogie Naipe; Jamz – Tudo Nosso; Ludmilla – A Danada Sou Eu	
2018	Anaadi	Noturno	Erasmo Carlos – Amor é isso; Iza – Dona de Mim; Ana Vilela – Ana Vilela; Xênia França – Xenia	
2019	Anavitória	O Tempo É Agora	As Bahias e a Cozinha Mineira – Tarântula; Ana Cañas – Todxs; Mahmundi – Para Dias Ruins; Jair Oliveira – Selfie	
2020	Céu	Apká!	Anavitória – N; As Bahias e a Cozinha Mineira – Enquanto Estamos Distantes; Marcelo Jeneci – Guaia; Melim – Eu Feat. Você	
2021	Anavitória	Cor	Vitor Kley – A Bolha; Nando Reis & Duda Beat – Duda Beat & Nando Reis; Fernanda Takai – Será que Você Vai Acreditar?; Tuyo – Chegamos Sozinhos em Casa, Vol. 1	
2022	Bala Desejo	Sim Sim Sim	Gilsons – Pra Gente Acordar; Jão – Pirata; Marina Sena – De Primeira; Luísa Sonza – Doce 22	
2023	Xênia França	Em Nome da Estrela	Bryan Behr – Bryan Behr Ao Vivo Em São Paulo; Hodari – Hodari; Melim – Quintal; Rubel – As Palavras, Vol. 1 & 2	
2024	Os Garotin	Os Garotin de São Gonçalo	IZA – Afrodhit; Jão – Super; Melly – Amaríssima; Luísa Sonza – Escândalo Íntimo	
2025	Liniker	Caju	Carol Biazin – No Escuro, Quem É Você?; Janeiro – Fugacidade; Julia Mestre – Maravilhosamente Bem; Marina Sena – Coisas Naturais	
2026	Anitta	Equilibrium	Ludom – Ludom; Luedji Luna – Antes Que a Terra Acabe; Jenni Mosello – BRava; Marina Sena – MARINADA vol.01	
