= Paulinho (musician) =

Brazilian vocalist (1952–2020)

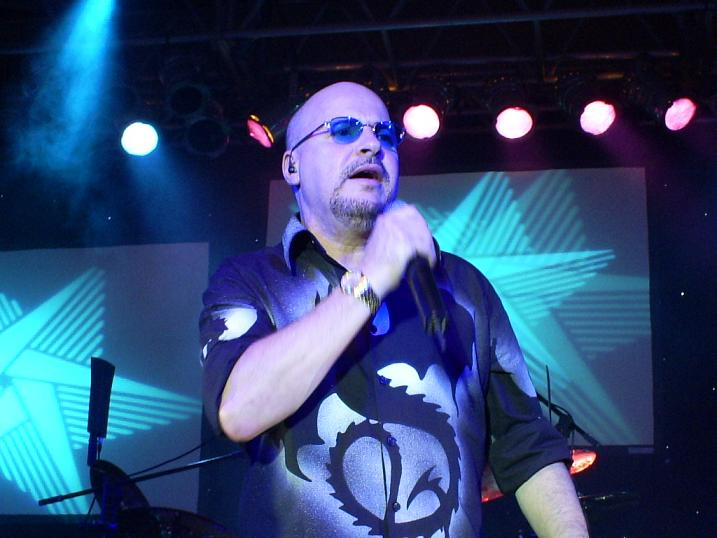

Background information
- Born: Paulo César dos Santos; 6 September 1952; Rio de Janeiro, Rio de Janeiro, Brazil
- Died: 14 December 2020 (aged 68) Rio de Janeiro, Rio de Janeiro (state), Brazil
- Genre: Soft rock
- Occupations: Singer and percussionist
- Years active: 1970–2020
- Formerly of: Roupa Nova

Paulo César dos Santos (6 September 1952 – 14 December 2020), better known as Paulinho, was a Brazilian singer and percussionist, member of the group Roupa Nova. He died at the age of 68, from multiple organ failure after a cardiopulmonary arrest aggravated by COVID-19.

== Career ==
Paulinho was born on 6 September 1952 in the city of Rio de Janeiro.

In the early 1970s, Paulinho was a vocalist and percussionist for a Rio dance band called Los Panchos Villa, alongside Kiko and Ricardo Feghali, his future companions in Roupa Nova. At that time, he was already attending the performances of the band Os Famks, which had great influence on the night in Rio. In 1974, he received an invitation to sing and play in this second band. Shortly after entering, he invited Kiko to replace the guitarist.

== Roupa Nova ==
Paulinho sang as the main vocalist in several songs of the Roupa Nova group, including ""Canção de Verão", "Clarear", "Sensual", "Volta pra Mim", Whisky a Go-Go", "Linda Demais", and "Meu Universo É Você." The band also played "Reacender" with the band Ben's Brother, recorded for the album Roupa Nova em Londres, from 2009 and "Sonhando Com Os Pés no Chão" from the album Todo Amor do Mundo, released at the end of 2015. Other recent hits were Luz de Emergência and Alma Brasileira, featured on the album As Novas do Roupa released in 2019, and the single Noites Traiçoeiras, released on digital platforms in 2019.

Paulinho also held the role of percussionist in Roupa Nova. Paulinho has already shared the stage with important names of national and international music such as The Commodores in Esse Tal de Repi Enroll, Ivete Sangalo in O Sal da Terra, Zélia Duncan in Feira Moderna, Elba Ramalho in Fé Cega, Faca Amolada, Marjorie Estiano in Flagra, Ben's Brother in Reacender, Fresno in Show de Rock'n Roll, Zezé Di Camargo and Luciano in Depende, Marcos & Belutti in Mar de Lágrimas, Tico Santa Cruz in Princípio de Um Novo Tempo and Angelica in Você, O Surf e Eu, entre outros.

In 2009, due to health problems, he was replaced in three shows by the former singer of the band Rádio Táxi, Maurício Gasperini, but he recovered and returned.

With the group, he received in 2009 one of the biggest awards of the phonographic industry, the Latin Grammy for the best contemporary Brazilian pop album, a category in which Roupa Nova competed with names like Rita Lee, Ivete Sangalo, Skank and Jota Quest.

== Personal life ==
Paulinho was the father of Pepê, drummer for the band Jamz, revealed on the Rede Globo's Super Star program. He was also the father of the singer Twigg who recorded a duet with the Roupa Nova in the song O Barquinho, present in the double album commemorating the band's 35 years of career entitled Todo Amor do Mundo, released in late 2015.

== Health problems and death ==
In August 2020, Paulinho was diagnosed with lymphoma. In September, his treatment was done through an autologous bone marrow transplant, in which the patient's own stem cells are used. In November, he contracted COVID-19 during the COVID-19 pandemic in Brazil and his health deteriorated in the following weeks. In November 2020, Paulinho was admitted to Hospital Copa D'Or, in Rio de Janeiro, with COVID-19 in the context of the coronavirus pandemic and he died on 14 December 2020. The wake was held in an undisclosed location and restricted to family members, and his remains were cremated.

== Compositions ==
Some songs credited to Paulinho were recorded by the group Roupa Nova and also by the singer and presenter Angélica.

Paulinho's Compositions
Music	Author	Album	Years
"Assim Como Eu"	Cleberson Horsth, Paulinho Tapajós e Paulinho	Roupa Nova	1983
"Fora do Ar"	Paulinho Tapajós, Piska e Paulinho	Roupa Nova	1983
"Mary Help"	Paulinho e Kiko	Vida Vida	1994
"Só Você e Eu"	Paulinho e Serginho Herval	Luz	1988
"Tempo de Encarar"	Cleberson Horsth, Kiko, Nando, Ricardo Feghali, Serginho Herval e Paulinho	Todo Amor do Mundo	2016
"Vozes do Coração"	Serginho Herval e Paulinho	Angélica	2001
