= Anavitória (album) =

Studio album by Anavitória
- Released: August 19, 2016
- Genre: Pop, folk
- Length: 34:23
- Label: Forasteiro, Universal Music
- Producer: Tiago Iorc

Anavitória chronology
Anavitória (2016)	O Tempo É Agora (2018)

Anavitória is the debut studio album by Brazilian duo Anavitória. It was released on August 19, 2016 The album was produced by Tiago Iorc.

Anavitória was nominated for Best Portuguese Language Contemporary Pop Album at the 18th Latin Grammy Awards and the song "Trevo (Tu)" won the Best Portuguese Language Song award in the same edition.

== Track listing ==
No.	Title	Writer(s)	Length
1.	"Agora Eu Quero Ir"	Ana Clara Caetano; Tiago Iorc	3:13
2.	"Cor de Marte"	Caetano	3:11
3.	"Singular"	Caetano	3:26
4.	"Chamego Meu"	Caetano	3:07
5.	"Trevo (Tu)" (featuring Tiago Iorc)	Caetano; Iorc	3:25
6.	"Coração Carnaval"	Caetano	0:51
7.	"Dengo"	Caetano	3:07
8.	"Tocando em Frente"	Almir Sater; Renato Teixeira	3:33
9.	"Talvez a Deus"	Caetano; Iorc	3:26
10.	"Tua"	Caetano	3:07
11.	"Nós"	Caetano	3:39
Total length:			34:23

== Charts ==
Chart (2016–17)	Peak position
Brazilian Albums (Pro-Música Brasil)	6
Portuguese Albums (AFP)	9

== Certifications ==
Certifications for Anavitória
Region	Certification	Certified units/sales
Brazil (Pro-Música Brasil)	Diamond	300,000^{‡}
^{‡} Sales+streaming figures based on certification alone.
