= Let Yourself In =

Studio album by Tiago Iorc
- Released: 2008
- Recorded: 2008–2009
- Genre: Soul, jazz, rock, pop
- Length: 41:57
- Label: Som Livre
- Producer: Alexandre Castilho; Victor Pozas

Tiago Iorc chronology
Let Yourself In (2008)	Umbilical (2011)

Alternative Cover
- Japan Special Edition cover

Let Yourself In is the debut album by Brazilian indie pop singer Tiago Iorc, released in March 2008.

== Track listing ==
All songs written by Tiago Iorc except where noted.

1. "No One There" – 3:55
2. "Blame" – 3:53
3. "Fine" – 3:08
4. "Nothing But a Song" – 3:15
5. "Scared" – 3:35
6. "Ticket to Ride" – 3:43 (John Lennon, Paul McCartney)
7. "There's More to Life" – 4:05
8. "It's Not Time" – 4:29
9. "My Girl" – 3:29 (R. White, W. Robinson)
10. "When All Hope Is Gone" – 5:19
11. "Nothing But a Song" (Acoustic) – 3:03

== Reception ==
Halley: "The sonority of their music got what consecrated artists take years to conquer". Leoni: the "impressive voice" mentioned the singer and composer. Serginho Herval: I am "happy when it arrives to my hands the work of an unquestionable talent, with perfect musicality and of good high taste. Although still debuting in the career, his talent lets a maturity worthy of the great consecrated artists to appear. His personality singing, playing and composing is of a really amazing odd quality that there is a lot was not heard."

== Chart positions ==
Chart (2009)	Peak position
Japan Albums Chart	7

== Personnel ==
Credits adapted from Let Yourself In booklet liner notes.

- Tiago Iorc – lead vocals
- Daniel Gordon – drums
- Rodrigo Tavares – guitar
- Rodrigo Nogueira – bass guitar
- Leomaristi dos Santos – double bass

== Release history ==
Country	Date	Label
Brazil	March 12, 2008	Som Livre
Brazil	November 13, 2009	Som Livre
Japan	July 26, 2009	JVC Records
Philippines	March 3, 2010	Universal Records
South Korea	March 23, 2010	Kang & Music
