= Nina Fernandes =

Brazilian singer-songwriter

- Born: 3 September 1999 (age 26); São Paulo, Brazil
- Occupations: Singer; songwriter; instrumentalist
- Musical career
- Genres: Pop; MPB; Folk; Brazilian jazz; Hyperpop
- Instruments: Vocals; guitar; piano
- Years active: 2015–present
- Labels: SLAP/Som Livre (2017-2022), Sony Music Brasil (2016; 2024-)

Nina Fernandes (born 3 September 1999 in São Paulo) is a Brazilian singer-songwriter, occasionally hailed as one of the "new MPB rising stars". Her 2017 single "Cruel" was certified gold by Pro-Música Brasil.

== Biography and career ==
Fernandes composed the English language song "Your Eyes" at age 15; the song would be released 2016 with electronic artist Pontifexx under Sony Music. Encouraged by singer Nando Reis, whom she met at a flight after coming back to Brazil from the U.S., she composed her first Portuguese language song, "Sem fim", which reached Fernando Lobo, then general manager at Som Livre.

Fernandes has cited Aurora, Florence Welch, the aforementioned Nando Reis and Marisa Monte among her influences, as well as Charli XCX, Sevdaliza and SOPHIE.

Her first EP, Nina Fernandes, was released 27 October 2017 by Som Live under its SLAP label, including "Cruel", featured at Rede Globo telenovela Tempo de Amar and, as a digital single, certified gold, and "Estrada", whose videoclip was filmed in Portugal. All the tracks were her own compositions.

In 2019, Digitando..., her second EP was released also under SLAP, which included "Beijo", part of the TV series Malhação: Toda forma de amar soundtrack, "Casa", included on the soundtrack for the Netflix film Pai em dobro, and "Arroz com feijão", featuring OutroEu.

Her first album, amor é fuga: fuja, was released 6 October 2021 under Som Livre.

Fernandes signed again with Sony Music Brasil and released Sussurro 16 August 2024, the first single of Bhangzwum, her second album to be released the following month. Two weeks later, Fernandes released a second single, Água.

Her second album, Bhangzwn, was released 6 September 2024.

=== Composer ===
Besides composing most of her own songs, Fernandes co-wrote "Te procuro" for pop duo Anavitória, included on their 2021 album Cor; Fernandes's own rendition of the song is included on her 2021 album amor é fuga: fuja.

== Discography ==
=== Albums ===
- amor é fuga: fuja (Som Livre, 2021)
- Bhangzwn (Sony Music, 2024)

=== EP ===
- Nina Fernandes (SLAP/Som Livre, 2017)
- Digitando... (SLAP/Som Livre, 2019)

=== Singles ===
==== Som Livre / SLAP ====
- "Cruel" (2017)
- "Estrada 2.0" (2018)
- "Beijo" (2018)
- "Casa" (2018)
- "Por onde anda você?" (2020)
- "Casa" (2020, with César Lacerda)

==== Independently released ====
- "você vai gostar de mim" (2021)
- "compromisso" (2021)
- "o mesmo dia" (2022)
- "feitiço" (2022)
- "eu posso ser quem eu quiser" (2022)
- "dez mil coisas" (2023, with Roberta Campos)

==== Sony Music Brasil ====
- "Your eyes" (2016, as Nina F, with Pontifexx)
- "Sussurro" (2024)
- "Água" (2024)

=== Collaborations ===
==== Deck ====
- "Flecha" (2023, with Rebeca)
