= O Tempo É Agora =

Studio album by Anavitória
- Released: 3 August 2018
- Recorded: May–June 2018
- Length: 38:27
- Language: Portuguese
- Labels: Forasteiro, Universal
- Producers: Tiago Iorc, Moogie Canazio, Felipe Simas (executive)

Anavitória chronology
Anavitória (2016)	O Tempo É Agora (2018)	N (2019)

O Tempo É Agora (English: The Time Is Now) is the second studio album by Brazilian duo Anavitória, released on 3 August 2018 via Forasteiro and Universal. It was produced by Moogie Canazio and Tiago Iorc, the latter continuing his role from their first album. In 2019, the album won the Latin Grammy for Best Portuguese Language Contemporary Pop Album.

== Reception ==
=== Critical ===
Pedro Antunes from O Estado de S. Paulo said "it's curious to notice how the innocence was lost. They're still Anavitória, more optimistic than any other thing, but their songs now suffer. Because not everything is about flowers, bare feet and filled beds, after all". He also thought Ana Caetano was now a better composer and did not put too much weight on the metaphors, dealing with senses and feelings".

Robson Gomes, from Jornal do Commercio, said "musically speaking, little has changed since the 2016 debut album and O Tempo é Agora. But the more recent work is marked by the maturing of lyrics and their evolution as artists."

Mauro Ferreira, from G1, said "Anavitória's sound has been being ground on the show business machine. (...) The album O tempo é agora is the result of this urgency in explore the moment and exhaust a success formula that, perhaps, won't be so effective in the market". He also believes that this supposed commercial exploit impacted in the duo's music. "What sounded natural in the 2016 album (...) already seems artificial in the current one (...). He ended his review saying that "if everything – sold out shows, hundreds of views in video platforms, the fans fervor – is gone in a probably still distant future, Anavitória might still resist in the scene due to the essence that the music industry cannot grind to the full in the albumO tempo é agora."

O Tempo É Agora was ranked as the 37th best Brazilian album of 2018 by Rolling Stone Brasil.

=== Accolades ===
Year	Award	Category	Outcome	Ref.
2019	Latin Grammy	Latin Grammy Award for Best Portuguese Language Contemporary Pop Album	Won	

=== Certifications ===
Region	Certification	Certified units/sales
Brazil (Pro-Música Brasil)	Platinum	80,000^{‡}
^{‡} Sales+streaming figures based on certification alone.

== Track listing ==
The standard edition of the album contains eleven tracks.

O Tempo É Agora track listing
No.	Title	Writer(s)	Length
1.	"Ai, Amor" (Oh, Love)	Ana Caetano	3:40
2.	"Porque Eu Te Amo" (Because I Love You)	Caetano; Iorc	3:36
3.	"Calendário" (Calendar)	Caetano	3:45
4.	"Outrória" (featuring OutroEu)	Caetano; Mike Tulio	2:58
5.	"A Gente Junto" (Us Together)	Caetano; Iorc	3:38
6.	"O Tempo É Agora" (The Time Is Now)	Caetano; Vitória Falcão	3:43
7.	"Preta" (Black)	Caetano	3:08
8.	"Canção de Hotel" (Hotel Song)	Caetano; Tulio	2:48
9.	"Cecília"	Caetano	2:51
10.	"Dói Sem Tanto" ((It) Hurts Without So Much)	Caetano	3:58
11.	"Se Tudo Acaba" (If Everything Ends)	Caetano; Tulio	4:04
Total length:			38:27

== Promotion ==
=== O Tempo É Agora Tour ===
Following the end of the tour with Nando Reis in July 2018, it was announced that a semi-fictional movie featuring the duo as protagonists would be released in August, named Ana e Vitória. The album was announced on the same day. On 18 December 2020, the duo released the show in a film format, titled O Tempo É Agora: Ao Vivo na Fundição.

== Personnel ==
- Ana Caetano — lead vocals
- Vitória Falcão — lead vocals
- Mike Tulio — volead vocals
- Jamie Wollam — drums
- Sean Hurley — bass
- Tim Pierce — guitars
- Roberto Pollo — keyboards
- Jamie Muhoberac — keyboards
- Recording engineer — Moogie Canazio
- Recording assistants — Matt Wolach, Bo Bodnar, June Murakawa, Daniel Pampury
- Digital editing — Moogie Canazio
- Musical production — Tiago Iorc and Moogie Canazio
- Executive production and direction — Felipe Simas
- A&R direction — Miguel Cariello
- A&R manager — Miguel Afonso
- A&R coordination — Igor Alarcon, Marina Furtado, Patricia Aidas, Clarice Carrilho
- Label manager — Bárbara Cotta
- Production manager — Isadora Silveira

== Certifications ==
Certifications for O Tempo é Agora
Region	Certification	Certified units/sales
Brazil (Pro-Música Brasil)	Diamond	300,000^{‡}
^{‡} Sales+streaming figures based on certification alone.
