= 17th Annual Latin Grammy Awards =

Music awards presented Nov 2016

17th Latin Grammy Awards
- Date: November 17, 2016
- Venue: T-Mobile Arena, Paradise, Nevada

Highlights
- Person of the Year: Marc Anthony

Television/radio coverage
- Network: Univision

The 17th Annual Latin Grammy Awards were held on November 17, 2016, at the T-Mobile Arena in Las Vegas.

The nominations were announced on September 21, 2016. Julio Reyes Copello, Djavan, Fonseca, Jesse & Joy, and Ricardo López Lalinde led with four nominations each. American singer Marc Anthony was honored as the Latin Recording Academy Person of the Year on November 16, the day prior to the Latin Grammy Awards.

== Performers ==
Artist(s)	Song(s)
Pablo López; Juanes; Mystere by Cirque du Soleil	Tu Enemigo
Jesse & Joy	Me Soltaste
Wisin	Vacaciones
Joss Favela	Cuando Fuimos Nada
Fonseca; Alexis & Fido	Vine a Buscarte
Reik	Ya Me Enteré
Yandel	Nunca Me Olvides
Prince Royce; Gerardo Ortíz	Moneda
Carlos Vives	La Bicicleta
J Balvin; Pharrell Williams; Bia; Sky	Safari
Mon Laferte; Juanes	Si Tu Me Quiesieras; Fuego
Farruko; Ky-Mani Marley	Chillax
Marc Anthony; Jennifer López	I Need to Know; Tu Amor Me Hace Bien; Vivir Mi Vida; Olvídame y Pega la Vuelta
Manuel Medrano	Bajo el Agua
Banda Los Recoditos	Me Está Gustando
Rachel Platten; Diego Torres	Siempre Estaré Ahí
Los Fabulosos Cadillacs	El Rey del Swing; Matador
Eugenia León; Tania Libertad; Guadalupe Pineda	Mi Canto Viene del Sur
Gente de Zona	Tu y Yo; La Gozadera
Laura Pausini	Lado Derecho del Corazon

== Awards ==
The following is the list of nominees. Winners are listed first and in bold.

=== General ===
Record of the Year

Carlos Vives and Shakira — "La Bicicleta"

- Pepe Aguilar — "Cuestión de Esperar"
- Pablo Alborán — "Se Puede Amar"
- Andrea Bocelli — "Me Faltarás"
- Buika — "Si Volveré"
- Djavan — "Vidas Pra Contar"
- Enrique Iglesias featuring Wisin — "Duele el Corazón"
- Jesse & Joy — "Ecos de Amor"
- Laura Pausini — "Lado Derecho del Corazón"
- Diego Torres — "Iguales"

Album of the Year

Juan Gabriel — Los Dúo 2

- Pablo Alborán — Tour Terral: Tres Noches en Las Ventas
- Andrea Bocelli — Cinema (Edición en Español)
- Andrés Cepeda — Mil Ciudades
- Djavan — Vidas Pra Contar
- Fonseca — Conexión
- Jesse & Joy — Un Besito Más
- José Lugo & Guasábara Combo — ¿Donde Están?
- Diego Torres — Buena Vida
- Julieta Venegas — Algo Sucede

Song of the Year

Andrés Castro, Shakira and Carlos Vives — "La Bicicleta" (Carlos Vives and Shakira)

- Patty Brayden, Ned Claflin and John Finbury — "A Chama Verde" (John Finbury featuring Marcella Camargo)
- Flavio Cianciarulo — "La Tormenta" (Los Fabulosos Cadillacs)
- Fonseca — "Céu"
- Enrique Iglesias, Patrick A. Ingunza, Silverlo Lozada, Servando Moriche Primera Mussett, Hasibur Rahman, Francisco Saldana and Wisin — "Duele el Corazón" (Enrique Iglesias featuring Wisin)
- Manuel Medrano — "Bajo el Agua"
- Paulinho Moska and Fito Páez — "Hermanos"
- Jesse & Joy, Danelle Leverett, Jason Reeves and Rune Westberg — "Ecos de Amor" (Jesse & Joy)
- Kevin Johansen — "Es Como El Día"
- Sin Bandera — "En Ésta No"

Best New Artist

Manuel Medrano

- Sophia Abrahão
- Álex Anwandter
- The Chamanas
- Esteman
- Joss Favela
- ILE
- Mon Laferte
- Morat
- Ian Ramil

=== Pop ===
Best Contemporary Pop Vocal Album

Jesse & Joy — Un Besito Más

- Pablo Alborán — Tour Terral
- Pablo López — El Mundo y los Amantes Inocentes
- Luciano Pereyra — #TuMano
- Reik — Des/Amor

Best Traditional Pop Vocal Album

Juan Gabriel — Los Dúo, Vol. 2

- Adrián — Lleno de Vida
- Andrea Bocelli — Cinema
- Andrés Cepeda — Mil Ciudades
- Diego Torres — Buena Vida

=== Urban ===
Best Urban Fusion/Performance

Yandel — "Encantadora"

- Alexis & Fido — "Una En Un Millón"
- El Dusty featuring Happy Colors — "Cumbia Anthem"
- Jacob Forever — "Hasta Que Se Seque El Malecon"
- Tubarao featuring Maneirinho and Anitta — "Pra Todas Elas"

Best Urban Music Album

J Balvin — Energia

- El B — Luz
- Emicida — Sobre Crianças, Quadris, Pesadelos e Lições de Casa...
- Farruko — Visionary
- Arianna Puello — Despierta

Best Urban Song

Egbert Rosa Cintrón, Farruko, Eduardo A. Vargas Berrios and Yandel — "Encantadora" (Yandel)

- Miguel Correa, Cosculluela, Daddy Yankee, José Gómez, Roberto Martínez Lebrón, Jorge Oquendo and Orlando Javier Valle Vega — "A Donde Voy" (Cosculluela featuring Daddy Yankee)
- De La Ghetto — "Acércate"
- Juan Alonzo V. Angulo, Francisco Espinoza, David Rolas, Sito Rocks and Rafael Vargas — "12 Rosas" (David Rolas featuring Fulanito and Sito Rocks)
- Arianna Puello — "Hardcore y Feroz"

=== Rock ===
Best Rock Album

Los Fabulosos Cadillacs — La Salvación de Solo Y Juan

- Andrea Álvarez — Y Lo Dejamos Venir
- Marilina Bertoldi — Sexo Con Modelos
- Massacre — Biblia Ovni
- Spinetta — Los Amigo

Best Pop/Rock Album

Julieta Venegas — Algo Sucede

- Caramelos de Cianuro — 8
- Jotdog — Universos Paralelos
- La Santa Cecilia — Buenaventura
- Meteoros — Meteoros

Best Rock Song

Flavio Cianciarulo — "La Tormenta" (Los Fabulosos Cadillacs)

- Asier Cazalis — "Abismo" (Caramelos de Cianuro)
- Gustavo Cordera — "Fantasma Soy"
- Luisina Bertoldi, Brenda Martín and Gabriel Pedernera — "Nada Salvaje" (Eruca Sativa)
- Massacre — "Niña Dios"

=== Alternative ===
Best Alternative Music Album

Illya Kuryaki and the Valderramas — L.H.O.N.

- Bebe — Cambio de Piel
- Esteman — Caótica Belleza
- Mon Laferte — Mon Laferte - Vol. 1
- Carla Morrison — Amor Supremo

Best Alternative Song

Carla Morrison — "Vez Primera"

- Gustavo Cortés, Ricardo Cortés and Nicolas González — "Ángeles y Serafines" (Sig Ragga)
- Vicentico — "Averno, El Fantasma" (Los Fabulosos Cadillacs)
- Felipe Antunes and Otávio Carvalho — "Deus" (Vitrola Sintética)
- Kevin Johansen — "Es Como El Día"

=== Tropical ===
Best Salsa Album

India — Intensamente India Con Canciones de Juan Gabriel

- Grupo Niche — 35 Aniversario
- José Lugo and Guasábara Combo — ¿Dónde Están?
- Bobby Valentín – Mi Ritmo es Bueno
- Johnny Ventura – Tronco Viejo

Best Cumbia/Vallenato Album

Fonseca — Homenaje (A La Música de Diomedes Díaz)

- El Gran Martín Elías & Rolando Ochoa— Imparables
- Kuisitambó — Desde El Fondo
- Felipe Peláez and Manuel Julían — Vestirte De Amor
- Various Artists — Mujeres Por Colombia - Vallenato Volúmen 2

Best Contemporary Tropical Album

Guaco — Guaco Histórico 2

- Héctor Acosta — Merengue y Sentimiento
- David Calzado and Charanga Habanera — Vivito y Coleando
- Toño Restrepo — En La Sala con El Joe
- Daniel Santacruz — Toda La Vida
- Charlie Zaa — Mi Mejor Regalo

Best Traditional Tropical Album

Sonora Santanera — La Sonora Santanera En Su 60 Aniversario

- Rafael Pollo Brito — Pa' Tío Simón
- Jesús "Chino" Miranda — El Malquerido: Original Motion Picture Soundtrack
- Septeto Nacional Ignacio Piñeiro — El Más Grande y Universal
- Various Artists — Cuba y Puerto Rico Son...

Best Tropical Fusion Album

Gente de Zona — Visualízate

- Cali Flow Latino — Full Hd
- Cosa Nuestra — Pregoneros de La Calle
- Explosión Negra — Levántate
- Treo — Genera

Best Tropical Song

Omar Alfanno, Fonseca, and Yadam González Cárdenas – "Vine A Buscarte" (Fonseca)

- Jorge Luis Piloto – "Esta Noche Hay Fiesta" (Maía)
- Antonio Ávila – "La Bala" (Johnny Ventura featuring Gilberto Santa Rosa)
- Prince Royce and Daniel Santacruz – "La Carretera" (Prince Royce)
- Orlando Rodríguez Di Pietro – "No Me Daba Cuenta" (Gabriel C)

=== Singer-Songwriter ===
Best Singer-Songwriter Album

Manuel Medrano — Manuel Medrano

- Francisco Céspedes — Todavía
- Djavan — Vidas Pra Contar
- Pedro Guerra — Arde Estocolmo
- Kevin Johansen + The Nada — Mis Américas, Vol. 1/2
- Alejandro Lerner — Auténtico

=== Regional Mexican ===
Best Banda Album

Banda El Recodo De Cruz Lizárraga — Raíces

- Julión Álvarez — Mis Ídolos, Hoy Mis Amigos!!!
- Banda Los Recoditos — Me Está Gustando
- Banda Troyana — Tengo Ganas de Ser Fiel
- La Séptima Banda — A Todos Volumen

Best Tejano Album

Michael Salgado — Por Cielo y Tierra

- Ram Herrera — Mucho Mas Que Amor
- The Legends — La Historia de La Musica Tejana
- Marian y Mariel — Vulnerable a Ti
- Jay Perez — Un Amigo Tendrás

Best Norteño Album

Los Tigres del Norte — Desde El Azteca

- Joss Favela — Hecho a Mano
- Intocable — Highway
- Los Ramones De Nuevo León — Tierra Mojada
- Pesado — Tributo a Los Alegres De Terán

Best Regional Mexican Song

Erika Ender, Manu Morendo, and Mónica Vèlez — "Ataúd" (Los Tigres del Norte)

- Javier Manriquez — "Amor de Los Pobres" (La Original Banda El Limón De Salvador Lizáarraga)
- Salvador Aponte, Dany Pérez, and César Valdivia — "Me Está Gustando" (Banda Los Recoditos)
- Espinoza Paz — "Te Dirán" (La Addictiva Banda San José de Mesillas)
- Joan Sebastian — "Volví Pa'l Pueblo"

=== Instrumental ===
Best Instrumental Album

Hamilton de Holanda — Samba de Chico

- Víctor Biglione — Mercosul
- João Donato — Donato Elétrico
- Carlos Franzetti — Argentum
- Bruno Miranda — Mosaico

=== Traditional ===
Best Folk Album

Palo Cruza'O — En Armonías Colombianas

- Grupo Mapeyé — En Las Islas Canarias
- Los Huayra — Gira
- Nahuel Pennisi — Primavera
- Marco Rodrigues — Fados do Fado

Best Tango Album

Nicolás Ledesma y Su Orquesta — Cuando Llora la Milonga

- Ariel Ardit and Filarmónica de Medellín — Gardel Sinfónico
- Julio Botti, Pablo Ziegler and Saul Zaks conducting the University of Southern Denmark Symphony Orchestra — Sax to Tango
- Omar Mollo — ... Tangamente
- Leonardo Pastore — Carlos Gardel Original

Best Flamenco Album

Niña Pastori — Ámame Como Soy

- Remedios Amaya — Rompiendo El Silencio
- José Mercé — Doy La Cara
- Antonio Reyes and Diego Del Morao — Directo En El Círculo Flamenco de Madrid
- María Toledo — Magnética

=== Jazz ===
Best Latin Jazz Album

Arturo O'Farrill & The Afro Latin Jazz Orchestra — Cuba: The Conversation Continues

- Mario Adnet — Jobim Jazz (Ao Vivo)
- Antonio Adolfo — Tropical Infinito
- Raul Agraz — Between Brothers
- Carrera Quinta — Big Band

=== Christian ===
Best Christian Album (Spanish Language)

Marcos Vidal — 25 Años

- Christine D'Clario — Eterno (Live)
- Generasion — Ciudad de Luz
- Alex Sampedro — Alex Sampedro
- Emir Sensini — Deseo tu Gloria

Best Christian Album (Portuguese Language)

Anderson Freire — Deus Não Te Rejeita

- Paulo César Baruk — Graça Quase Acústico
- Ceremonya — A Vida Num Segundo
- Padre Fabio de Melo — Deus No Esconderijo Do Verso
- Adelso Freire — Reaprender

=== Portuguese Language ===
Best Portuguese Language Contemporary Pop Album

Céu — Tropix

- Tiago Iorc — Troco Likes
- Larissa Luz — Território Conquistado
- Mariza — Mundo
- Thiago Ramil — Leve Embora

Best Portuguese Language Rock Album

Ian Ramil — Derivacivilização Scalene — Éter

- Boogarins — Manual
- Jay Vaquer — Canções de Exílio
- Versalle — Distante em Algum Lugar

Best Samba/Pagode Album

Martinho da Vila — De Bem Com a Vida

- Eduardo Gudin — Notícias Dum Brasil 4
- Corina Magalhães — Tem Mineira no Samba
- Rogê e Arlindo Cruz — Na Veia
- Various Artists — Sambas Para Mangueira

Best MPB Album

Elza Soares — A Mulher do Fim do Mundo

- Dani Black — Dilúvio
- Roberta Campos — Todo Caminho é Sorte
- Celso Fonseca — Like Nice
- Roberta Sá — Delírio

Best Brazilian Roots Album

Almir Sater e Renato Teixeira — AR

- Lucy Alves e Clã Brasil — No Forró do Seu Rosil
- Heraldo do Monte — Heraldo do Monte
- Elba Ramalho — Cordas, Gonzaga e Afins
- Alceu Valença — A Luneta e o Tempo (soundtrack)

Best Portuguese Language Song

Djavan — "Vidas Pra Contar"

- Tiago Iorc — "Amei Te Ver"
- Almir Sater, Paulo Simões and Renato Teixeira — "D de Destino" (Almir Sater and Renato Teixeira)
- Dani Black — "Maior" (Dani Black and Milton Nascimento)
- Douglas Germano — "Maria da Vila Matilde" (Elza Soares)

=== Children's ===
Best Latin Children's Album

123 Andrés — Arriba Abajo

- ClaraLuna — 1,2,3 Llega Navidad
- Marta Gómez — Canciones de Sol
- Omara Portuondo — Canciones de Cri Cri “El Grillo Cantor”
- Various Artists — Canciones y Palabras, Vol. 1
- Xuxa — Abc Do Xspb

=== Classical ===
Best Classical Album

Cuarteto Latinoamericano and Jaramar — El Hilo Invisible (Cantos Sefaradíes)

- Jordi Savall — Biber: Baroque Splendor
- Edith Peña — Danzas En Todos Los Tiempos
- A Corte Musical — Durón: Lagrimas, Amor. . .
- José Serebrier — José Serebrier Conducts Samuel Adler

Best Classical Contemporary Composition

Claudia Montero — "Cuarteto Para Buenos Aires"

- Roberto Sierra — "Beyond The Silence Of Sorrow" (Maximiano Valdés conducting the Puerto Rico Symphony Orchestra)
- Fernando Otero — "Jardín del Adiós" (Nick Danielson, violinist; Fernando Otero, pianist)
- Gustavo Casenave — "Mi Familia" (Gustavo Casenave featuring Nick Danielson and Pedro Giraudo)
- Leo Brouwer — "Sonata de Los Viajeros" (Brasil Guitar Duo)

=== Recording Package ===
Best Recording Package

Sergio Mora — El Poeta Halley (Love of Lesbian)

- Lisa Akerman Stefaneli — Atlas (Baleia)
- Goster — Impredecible (Bareto)
- Marcus Mota — Relevante (Mario Diníz)
- Goster — Umbral(Melnik)

=== Production ===
Best Engineered Album

Be Hussey, Gustavo Lenza, Diogo Poças, Rodrigo Sanches, Mike Cresswell and Felipe Tchauer — Tropix (Céu)

- Rodrigo Campello, Márcio Gama, Aurélio Kauffmann, Jon Luz, Fernando Nunes and Carlos Freitas — Delírio (Roberta Sá)
- Moogie Canazio and Ron McMaster — Like Nice (Celso Fonseca)
- Salomé Limón and Caco Refojo — Magnética (María Toledo)
- Daniel Musy and André Dias — Samba de Chico (Hamilton de Holanda)

Producer of the Year

Rafa Arcaute

- Eduardo Cabra
- Moogie Canazio
- Kim Fanlo
- Rafa Sardina

=== Music video ===
Best Short Form Music Video

Illya Kuryaki and the Valderramas – "Gallo Negro"

- Álex Anwandter – "Siempre Es Viernes En Mi Corazón"
- Gustavo Casas y Los Que Buscan – "Verte Ya"
- Delafé – "Lo Más Bonito del Mundo"
- El Guincho featuring Mala Rodríguez – "Comix"

Best Long Form Music Video

Alejandro Sanz – Sirope Vivo

- Babasónicos – Desde Adentro - Impuesto De Fe (En Vivo)
- Bebe – 10 Años Con Bebe
- Dvicio – Justo Ahora y Siempre
- Eugenia León, Tania Libertad and Guadalupe Pineda – Primera Fila

== Special Merit Awards ==
The following is a list of special merit awards

Lifetime Achievement Awards

- Eugenia León
- Ricardo Montaner
- Ednita Nazario
- Piero

Trustees Award

- Carlos Mejía Godoy
- Nelson Motta
- Rafael Solano Sánchez

== Changes to award categories ==
- Due to the low number of entries, the Best Ranchero/Mariachi Album category was not awarded that year.
- The Brazilian field was renamed to Portuguese Language field
