= Cor (album) =

Studio album by Anavitória
- Released: 1 January 2021
- Recorded: 2020
- Studios: Estúdios Rocinante and Estúdio do Tó
- Genre: Folk-pop
- Length: 48:06
- Language: Portuguese
- Label: Anavitória Artes
- Producers: Ana Caetano, Tó Brandileone

Anavitória chronology
N (2019)	Cor (2021)

Cor (English: "color") is the fourth studio album by Brazilian duo Anavitória, released by surprise on 1 January 2021. Produced by Tó Bandileone (from 5 a Seco) and member Ana Caetano, it was prepared during the COVID-19 pandemic.

All tracks in the album received videos published on YouTube and directed by Leonardo Lobo, doismilium and Gabriela de Melo, except "Eu Sei Quem É Você", directed by Belle. The album cover was taken from the video for the opening track "Amarelo, Azul e Branco".

== Production ==
The album was recorded in Itaipava, a neighborhood of Petrópolis, a city in the mountainous regions of the state of Rio de Janeiro by Brazilian Eng. Ricardo Mosca. Its title came to Ana Caetano's mind during a trip between Petrolina (Pernambuco) and Juazeiro do Norte (Ceará) on 14 December 2019. It's a three-letter word meant to allude to the fact that Cor is their third album of original songs and that the group involves three people (Caetano, Vitória Falcão and manager Felipe Simas). Caetano commented that the number three is also a representation of the union of the body, the spirit and the mind.

On 31 December 2020, the duo published a picture on their Instagram account (which would later be revealed as the album cover) and the subtitle "COR, 00:00".

Cor opens with "Amarelo, Azul e Branco", an autobiographical song in which Rita Lee recites some verses. The second track, "Te Amar É Massa Demais", has elements of samba-reggae and Mauro Ferreira from G1 considered "Explodir" the "romantic pop fofolk (Note: "fofolk" is a portmanteau of "fofo" ("cute" in Portuguese) and "folk".) typical of the band".

This Album was mastered by Brazilian Engineer Carlos Freitas at Classic Master Mastering Studios USA.

== Critical reception ==
Professional ratings
Review scores
Source	Rating
G1	3/5 stars

Mauro Ferreira, from G1, called the production "outsticking" to the extent that, in some moments (such as "Tenta Acreditar"), he considered it and the arrangements to be more interesting than the tracks themselves. He noted that the album is "too long for the 2020s phonographic standards", but praised the fact that the duo did not release it "sliced" in EPs or singles, as he states it has become "usual in the market". He finished his review saying that Cor "exposes Ana Caetano and Vitória Falcão still stuck to a past that brought them premature glory" and that "it's hard not to allow oneself to be enslaved by success".

=== Accolades ===
Year	Award	Category	Outcome	Ref.
2021	Latin Grammy	Best Portuguese Language Contemporary Pop Album	Won	
2021	Latin Grammy	Best Portuguese Language Song (for "Lisboa")	Won	

== Track listing ==
All tracks are written by Ana Caetano, except where specified

Cor track listing
No.	Title	Writer(s)	Length
1.	"Amarelo, Azul e Branco" (Yellow, Blue and White (featuring Rita Lee))	Ana Caetano, Vitória Falcão	3:21
2.	"Te Amar É Massa Demais" (Loving You Is So Much Cool)		4:04
3.	"Tenta Acreditar" (Try to Believe)	Ana; João Ferreira	3:53
4.	"Explodir" (Explodes)		4:25
5.	"Cigarra" (Cicada)		3:43
6.	"Selva" (Jungle)	Caetano, Tó Brandileone	2:55
7.	"[dia 34]" ([day 34])	Brandileone, Fábio Sá	0:48
8.	"Ainda É Tempo" (It's Still Time)		1:39
9.	"Eu Sei Quem É Você" (I Know Who You Are)		4:25
10.	"Terra" (Earth)		3:36
11.	"Abril" (April)		3:18
12.	"Te Procuro" (I Search for You)	Caetano, Nina Fernandes, Saulo Fernandes	3:56
13.	"Carvoeiro" (Coalmaker)	Caetano, Deco Martins	4:24
14.	"Lisboa" (Lisbon (featuring Lenine))	Caetano, Paulo Novaes	3:39
Total length:			48:06

== Personnel ==
Data for "Cigarra" and "[dia 34]" unavailable.

=== Musicians ===
- Ana Caetano – co-lead vocals on all tracks; choir on "Lisboa"
- Vitória Falcão – co-lead vocals on all tracks except "Ainda É Tempo"
- Tó Bandileone – guitar on all tracks except "Ainda É Tempo"; acoustic guitar on "Tenta Acreditar" and "Abril"; ukelele and percussion on "Cigarra" and "Lisboa"; programming on all tracks except "Ainda É Tempo"; bass synth on "Tenta Acreditar", "Selva", "Ainda É Tempo" and "Terra"; whistle on "Explodir"; synthesizer on "Explodir", "Carvoeiro" and "Lisboa"; mandolin and synth on "Eu Sei Quem É Você"; choir on "Explodir" and "Lisboa"
- Conrado Goys – guitar on all tracks except "Te Amar É Massa Demais", "Cigarra" and "Ainda É Tempo"; acoustic guitar on "Te Amar É Massa Demais", "Explodir", "Selva", "Eu Sei Quem É Você", "Terra", "Te Procuro", "Carvoeiro" and "Lisboa"
- Maro – acoustic guitar on "Explodir" and "Lisboa"
- Fabio Sá – bass on all tracks; esraj on "Tenta Acreditar"
- Mari Jacintho – keyboards on all tracks except "Cigarra" and "Ainda É Tempo", in which she plays the piano, and "Tenta Acreditar", "Terra", "Carvoeiro" and "Lisboa"
- Valmir Bessa – drums on all tracks except "Ainda É Tempo" and "Lisboa"
- Felipe Roseno – percussion on all tracks except "Ainda É Tempo", "Eu Sei Quem É Você", "Abril", "Te Procuro" and "Carvoeiro"
- Will Bone – trumpet, saxophone and tuba on "Amarelo, Azul e Branco", "Explodir", "Selva" and "Terra"; trombone on "Amarelo, Azul e Branco", "Explodir", "Selva", "Terra" and "Lisboa"; flute on "Selva" and "Terra"
- Maria Beraldo – clarinet and bass clarinet on "Lisboa"

=== Guest musicians ===
- Rita Lee – spoken words on "Amarelo, Azul e Branco"
- Lenine – co-lead vocals on "Lisboa"

=== Technical personnel ===
- Tó Brandileone – recording
- Ricardo Mosca – recording and mixing
- Carlos Freitas – Mastering at Classic Master USA studios
- Gabriela Schmdt – cover picture
- Isadora Silveira – production direction
- Felipe Simas – executive direction

== Certifications ==
Certifications for Cor
Region	Certification	Certified units/sales
Brazil (Pro-Música Brasil)	3× Platinum	240,000^{‡}
^{‡} Sales+streaming figures based on certification alone.
