= Troco Likes =

Studio album by Tiago Iorc
- Released: July 10, 2015
- Genre: Folk
- Length: 40:35
- Language: Portuguese
- Label: Slap
- Producer: Tiago Iorc

Tiago Iorc chronology
Zeski (2013)	Troco Likes (2015)	Troco Likes Ao Vivo (2016)

Troco Likes is the fourth studio album by Brazilian singer-songwriter Tiago Iorc. It was released on July 10, 2015. The album was produced by Tiago Iorc and Alexandre Castilho. Its lead single, "Coisa Linda", was released on June 1, 2015.

Troco Likes won Best Portuguese Language Contemporary Pop Album at the 17th Latin Grammy Awards.

== Track listing ==
No.	Title	Writer(s)	Length
1.	"Alexandria"	Tiago Iorc; Humberto Gessinger	3:42
2.	"Amei Te Ver"	Iorc	4:18
3.	"Mil Razões"	Iorc; Dani Black	4:05
4.	"Eu Errei"	Iorc	3:42
5.	"De Todas as Coisas"	Iorc	2:47
6.	"Coisa Linda"	Iorc; Leo Fressato	2:59
7.	"Bossa"	Duca Leindecker	3:42
8.	"Cataflor"	Iorc	3:47
9.	"Liberdade ou Solidão"	Iorc	3:30
10.	"Sol Que Faltava"	Iorc	3:44
11.	"Till I'm Old and Gray" (bonus track)	Iorc	4:19
Total length:			40:35
