= Vagarosa =

Studio album by Céu
- Released: 7 July 2009
- Recorded: Unknown
- Genres: MPB, pop, reggae
- Labels: Urban Jungle, Six Degrees
- Producers: Beto Vilares, Gustavo Lenza Gui Amabis

Céu chronology
Céu (2005)	Vagarosa (2009)	Caravana Sereia Bloom (2012)

Professional ratings
Review scores
Source	Rating
AllMusic	4/5 stars
Times (UK)	3/5 stars
The Guardian (UK)	5/5 stars
The Observer (UK)	4/5 stars
Financial Times(UK)	3/5 stars
The Telegraph(UK)	5/5 stars
The Independent(UK)	(positive)
BBC(UK)	(positive)
Le Temps(CH)	(positive)
PopMatters	8/10 stars
The New York Times	(positive)
Billboard	(positive)
NY Daily News	4/5 stars
LA Weekly	(positive)
Los Angeles Times	(positive)
Seattle Weekly	(positive)
SF Weekly	(positive)
Folha de S.Paulo	(positive)
Globo.com (BR)	(positive)

Vagarosa is the second album by Brazilian singer/songwriter Céu. It was produced by Urban Jungle in 2009. It was released on 7 July 2009 by Six Degrees Records in the USA/UK/Germany and by Universal Music in Brazil.

== Track listing ==
No.	Title	Writer(s)	Length
1.	"Sobre o Amor e Seu Trabalho Silencioso"	Céu	0:56
2.	"Cangote"	Céu	4:02
3.	"Comadi"	Céu, Beto Vilares	3:29
4.	"Bubuia" (with Anelis Assumpção and Thalma de Freitas)	Céu, Anelis Assumpção, Thalma de Freitas	3:14
5.	"Nascente"	Céu, Siba	3:19
6.	"Grains de Beauté"	Céu, Beto Vilares	3:34
7.	"Vira Lata" (with Luiz Melodia)	Céu	3:37
8.	"Papa"	Céu	1:20
9.	"Ponteiro"	Céu	3:38
10.	"Cordão da Insônia"	Céu, Beto Vilares	2:42
11.	"Rosa Menina Rosa" (with Los Sebozos Postizos)	Jorge Ben Jor	4:41
12.	"Sonâmbulo"	Céu, Bruno Buarque, DJ Marco, Serginho Machado, Lucas Martins, Guilherme Ribeiro	3:50
13.	"Espaçonave" (with Fernando Catatau)	Céu, Fernando Catatau	3:35

Bonus Track
No.	Title	Writer(s)	Length
14.	"Visgo De Jaca"	Rildo Hora, Sérgio Cabral	4:40

== Release history ==
Region	Date	Label
United Kingdom	7 July 2009	Six Degrees Records
United States	July 2009	Urban Jungle/Six Degrees Records
Brazil	2009	Urban Jungle
