= Tropix =

Studio album by Céu
- Released: March 25, 2016
- Genre: Synthpop, MPB, bossa nova
- Length: 47:55
- Label: Urban Jungle · Slap
- Producer: Hervé Salters · Pupillo

Céu chronology
Caravana Sereia Bloom (2012)	Tropix (2016)

Tropix is the fourth studio album by Brazilian singer-songwriter Céu. It was released March 25, 2016. The album was produced by Pupillo (Nação Zumbi drummer) and French Hervé Salters.

The album won two Latin Grammy Awards at the 17th Latin Grammy Awards for Best Portuguese Language Contemporary Pop Album and Best Engineered Album.

== Track listing ==
No.	Title	Writer(s)	Length
1.	"Perfume do Invisível"	Céu	5:08
2.	"Arrastar-te-ei"	Céu	3:38
3.	"Amor Pixelado"	Céu	4:15
4.	"Varanda Suspensa"	Céu · Hervé Salters	4:48
5.	"Pot-Pourri: Etílica / Interlúdio (feat. Tulipa Ruiz)"	Céu	4:21
6.	"A Menina e o Monstro"	Céu	3:21
7.	"Minhas Bics"	Céu	3:17
8.	"Chico Buarque Song"	Ricardo Salvagni · Carlos Volpato · Jair Vieira · Thomas Pappon	3:30
9.	"Sangria"	Céu · Lira	3:42
10.	"Camadas"	Céu · Fernando Almeida	3:14
11.	"A Nave Vai"	Jorge dü Peixe	4:47
12.	"Rapsódia Brasilis"	Céu	3:54
