= Olvídame y Pega la Vuelta =

1982 single by Pimpinela

Single by Pimpinela

from the album Pimpinela
- B-side: "Dímelo Delante de Ella"
- Released: 1984
- Recorded: 1982
- Length: 3:15
- Label: CBS Discos
- Songwriters: Joaquín Galán; Lucía Galán

"Olvídame y Pega la Vuelta" (Forget me and turn around) is a song written and recorded by Argentine sibling duo Pimpinela from their 1982 self-titled album. Pimpinela recorded an English-language version of the song titled "Get Out of My Life, Now!" as well an Italian version titled "Te puoi scordare per sempre di me" (You can forget about me forever) and in Portuguese titled "Siga seu rumo" (Follow your way). In 2005, a reggaeton remix was made for the song. Digital media About en Español included it in the list of the best "heartbreak songs."

The song was covered in 2002 by Serbian singer Jelena Jevremović with the title "Ljubav po sebi je greh".

== Jennifer Lopez and Marc Anthony version ==
"Olvídame y Pega la Vuelta"

Promotional single by Jennifer Lopez and Marc Anthony
- Language: Spanish
- Released: November 18, 2016
- Recorded: 2016
- Length: 3:31
- Label: Nuyorican; Sony Latin
- Songwriters: Joaquín Galán; Lucía Galán
- Producers: Arbise "Motiff" González; Julio Reyes Copello

Audio videos
- "Olvídame y Pega la Vuelta" on YouTube
- "Olvídame y Pega la Vuelta" (Tropical version) on YouTube

In 2016, American singers Jennifer Lopez and Marc Anthony recorded a version of the song. It was released digitally on November 18, 2016 by Nuyorican Productions and Sony Music Latin as a promotional single for her upcoming second Spanish studio album This song is Lopez and Anthony's fourth duet together since "No Me Ames" in 1999, "Escapémonos" in 2004, and "Por Arriesgarnos" in 2007.

A salsa/tropical remix was also recorded by the duo and was released on November 28, 2016. In September 2017, the song was nominated in the Favorite Tropical Song category of Latin American Music Awards.

=== Live performance ===
Lopez and Anthony performed the song live together at the 17th Annual Latin Grammy Awards on November 17, 2016. According to Carolina Miranda of the Los Angeles Times, "The performance was full of intensity, humor and passion — and every second of it was absolutely irresistible", describing it as "dramatic" and "laser-light-filled". E! Online wrote, "The two totally rocked the stage together, causing the crowd to go absolutely wild." Forbes contributor Veronica Villafañe called Lopez and Anthony's duet one of the biggest highlights of the awards show. Lucía Galán of Pimpinela praised Lopez and Anthony for covering their song. She called their version a "marvelous homage". Galán further remarked: "They interpreted it perfectly, kept its style and theme without detracting it. They did the theatrical part that is something that characterizes us and respected the melody. They could have made a ballad, salsa, something more danceable than it was but no, it was fabulous".

=== Charts ===
Chart performance for "Olvídame y Pega la Vuelta"
Chart (2016)	Peak position
Mexico Espanol Airplay (Billboard)	22
US Hot Latin Songs (Billboard)	17
US Latin Pop Airplay (Billboard)	9
US Tropical Airplay (Billboard) Tropical version	1
US Latin Airplay (Billboard)	18
