= CéU (album) =

Studio album by Céu
- Released: 2005
- Recorded: 2002–2004
- Genres: MPB, electropop
- Length: 48:54
- Label: Ambulante/Urban Jungle (WEA)
- Producers: Beto Vilares, Céu; Antoñio Pinto (track 12)

Céu chronology
CéU (2005)	Vagarosa (2009)

Singles from CéU
- 1. "Malemolência" Released: 2006; 2. "Lenda" Released: 2007; 3. "10 Contados" Released: 2008

Professional ratings
Review scores
Source	Rating
Allmusic	4/5 stars
PopMatters	8/10 stars
About.com	(not rated)
BBC Music	(not rated)

CéU is the self-titled debut album of Brazilian singer/songwriter Céu. It was nominated for a Grammy Award for Best Contemporary World Music Album of the year 2007.

It was as well the first international act released by Starbucks on their Hear Music Debut CD Series.

== Track listing ==
No.	Title	Writer(s)	Length
1.	"Vinheta Quebrante"	Beto Villares, Céu, Maurício Alves	0:54
2.	"Lenda"	Alec Haiat, Céu, Graziella Moretto	4:19
3.	"Malemolência"	Alec Haiat, Céu	2:54
4.	"Roda"	Beto Villares, Céu	5:18
5.	"Rainha"	Céu	3:39
6.	"10 Contados"	Alec Haiat, Céu	3:26
7.	"Vinheta Dorival"	Beto Villares	0:31
8.	"Mais Um Lamento"	Céu, Danilo Moraes	4:48
9.	"Concrete Jungle"	Bob Marley	3:32
10.	"Véu da Noite"	Beto Villares, Céu	6:17
11.	"Valsa pra Biu Roque"	Beto Villares, Céu	2:49
12.	"Ave Cruz"	Alec Haiat, Céu	3:26
13.	"O Ronco da Cuíca"	Aldir Blanc, João Bosco	3:23
14.	"Bobagem"	Céu	2:18
15.	"Samba na Sola"	Alec Haiat, Céu	3:07
16.	"Nação Postal (bonus track)"	Beto Villares, Céu	3:26
17.	"Malemolência [Remix by Instituto] (bonus track)"	Alec Haiat, Céu	3:00

Instead of track 17 O+ added alternatively the video clip "Rainha"; the Starbucks edition featured as 16th track the video clip for "Roda".

== Release history ==
Region	Date	Label	Format	Catalog
Brazil	2005	Ambulante/Urban Jungle (WEA)	CD	AMB03, 5051011690723
Europe	2005	O+ Music (Harmonia Mundi)	CD	OP110
United States	2006	Six Degrees, Starbucks	CD, digital download	657036 1129-2
Japan	2007	Victor	CD	VICP-63795
