= Umbilical (Tiago Iorc album) =

Studio album by Tiago Iorc
- Released: October 23, 2011
- Recorded: 2010–2011
- Genre: Rock; pop; alternative
- Label: Slap
- Producer: Andy Chase

Tiago Iorc chronology
Let Yourself In (2008)	Umbilical (2011)

Umbilical is the second studio album by Brazilian singer-songwriter Tiago Iorc, released October 2011.

== Background ==
Tiago spent little over five months gathering thoughts and musical ideas in his apartment in Brazil before teaming up with New York-based Andy Chase for the production of "Umbilical".

Chase — who had previously worked with groups such as The Smashing Pumpkins, Tahiti 80, and The Divine Comedy — pre-produced Tiago's album over the internet before actually meeting with him in Rio de Janeiro for recording sessions. After two weeks finishing basic tracks with the band, they both headed back to New York City for final recording and mixing at Stratosphere Sound — recording studio Chase co-owns with former Smashing Pumpkins guitarist James Iha and Fountains Of Wayne band member Adam Schlesinger.

"It was Tiago's voice that first drew me in. I had only heard a few songs from his debut album but there was a fragility and honesty in his voice that I connected with. I intentionally didn't study that album too much once I knew we were going to work together because I didn't want to feel I had rules about what genre to keep him in, or what production constraints we had to adhere to based on that first effort. I could sense there was immense potential in Tiago and his band, but I wanted to move them away from that clean, careful sound and see the music evolve towards something darker, grittier and more complex, which I felt would make his unusual voice stand out even that much more. Tiago is both a classic and a contemporary soul — combining the best of singers like Nick Drake and bands like Radiohead. I hope people can enjoy getting as caught up in the mastery of his lyrics and his beautiful, textural voice as I have". — Andy Chase

Umbilical was mastered at Sterling Sound by Ted Jensen and released in October 2011.

== Track listing ==
All songs written by Tiago Iorc except where noted.

1. "Story of a Man"
2. "Ducks in a Pond"
3. "Just So You Know"
4. "What Weighs Me Down"
5. "Umbilical"
6. "Patron"
7. "Gave Me a Name"
8. "Even (Song to a Friend)" (Iorc, Leomaristi)
9. "Who Needs Answers"
10. "If Everything Is Worth It"
11. "Unordinary Gold"

== Personnel ==
Credits adapted from Umbilical booklet liner notes.

- Andy Chase - producer, mixer
- Bruce Driscoll - additional production and mixing
- Daniel Gordon - drums, percussion
- Leomaristi dos Santos - double bass
- Rodrigo Nogueira - bass guitar
- Rodrigo Tavares - keyboards, guitar
- Rogério Leitum de Souza - trumpet, flugel horn
- Ted Jensen - mastering
- Tiago Iorc - vocals, acoustic guitar, acoustic piano, writer
