= Voz no Ouvido =

Studio album by Pedro Mariano
- Released: 2000
- Recorded: Trama Studies, Sao Paulo, Brazil
- Genre: MPB, Brazilian soul
- Label: Trama
- Producer: Otávio de Moraes and Pedro Mariano

Pedro Mariano chronology
Pedro Camargo Marino (1997)	Voz no Ouvido (2000)	Intuicão (2002)

Voz no Ouvido is an album by Pedro Mariano. Released in 2000, the album blends ballads with up tempo funk. Voz no Ouvido includes songs by Jair Oliveira, João Bosco and Aldir Blanc, Vinícius de Moraes and Tim Maia. The album was nominated in 2001 for a Latin Grammy.

== Track listing ==
1. "Abertura"
2. "Voz no Ouvido"
3. "Só Chamar"
4. "Tá Todo Mundo"
5. "Tem Que Ser Agora"
6. "Sorriso Falso"
7. "Profissionalismo É Isso Aí"
8. "Livre Pra Viver"
9. "Grande Amor"
10. "Tem Dó"
11. "Postal"
12. "Preciso Ser Amado"
13. "Fazendo Música, Jogando Bola"
