= Pedro Mariano =

Brazilian musician

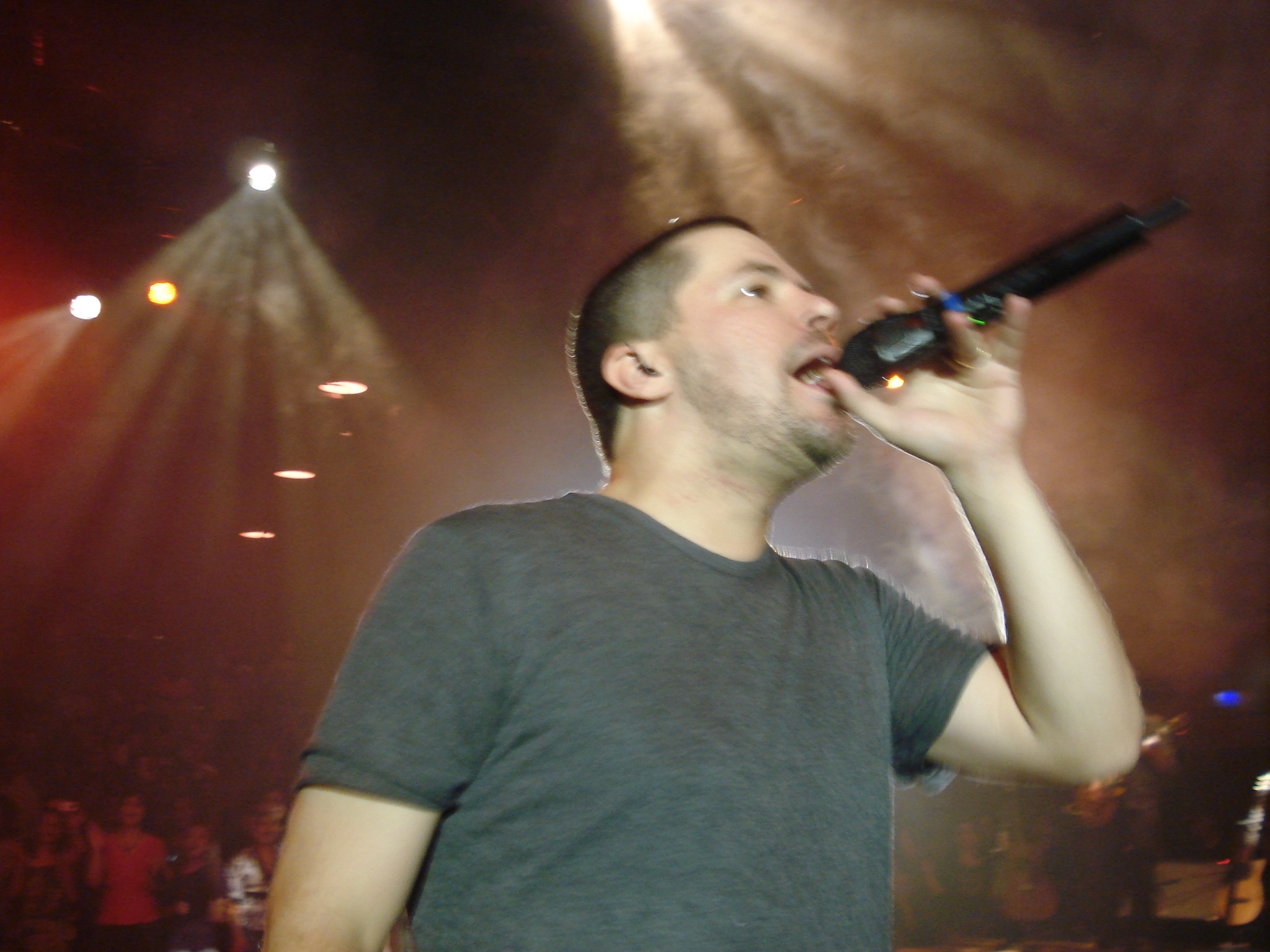
Pedro Mariano

Pedro Mariano, born Pedro Camargo Mariano, (born São Paulo April 18, 1975) is a Brazilian musician. He is the son of Brazilian singer Elis Regina and pianist Cesar Camargo Mariano, and the brother of Maria Rita.

In the early 1990s Pedro and his brother João Marcelo Bôscoli formed the band "Confraria". It would later include "Artistas Reunidos" musicians Max de Castro, on guitar, and Daniel Carlomagno on bass. Pedro left the group in 1994 to compose jingles and work on his solo career.

In 1995, he produced a tribute to his mother at PUC-SP. The supporting band included João Marcello, Max de Castro, Daniel Carlomagno, and Pedro. The tribute was a hit and became a TV special, broadcast by CNT.

Voz no Ouvido, was released in 2000 and received a Latin Grammy nomination in 2001 for best Contemporary Brazilian Pop. He received another nomination for his 2001 release Piano e Voz in the best MBP category.

In 1998 Pedro participated in the Projeto Artistas Reunidos (Project Artists United), an innovative collaboration of Música popular brasileira artists that fused classic samba and bossa nova with soul music, funk and electronica. Members included Jair Oliveira, Luciana Mello, João Marcelo Bôscoli, Daniel Carlomagno and brothers Max de Castro and Wilson Simoninha.

== Discography ==
Title	Details
Pedro Camargo Mariano	Released: 1997; Label: Sony Music; Format: CD
Voz no Ouvido	Released: 2000; Label: Trama; Format: CD, digital download
Intuição	Released: 2002; Label: Trama; Format: CD, digital download
Piano e Voz	Released: 2003; Label: Trama; Format: CD, digital download
Pedro Mariano Ao Vivo	Released: 2005; Label: Universal Music; Format: CD, digital download
Pedro Mariano	Released: 2007; Label: Universal Music; Format: CD, digital download
Incondicional	Released: 2009; Label: EMI, Nau; Format: CD, digital download
Pedro Mariano - 8	Released: 2011; Label: Nau; Format: CD, digital download
Pedro Mariano e Orquestra	Released: 2014; Label: Nau; Format: CD, digital download
