= Céu =

Brazilian singer-songwriter

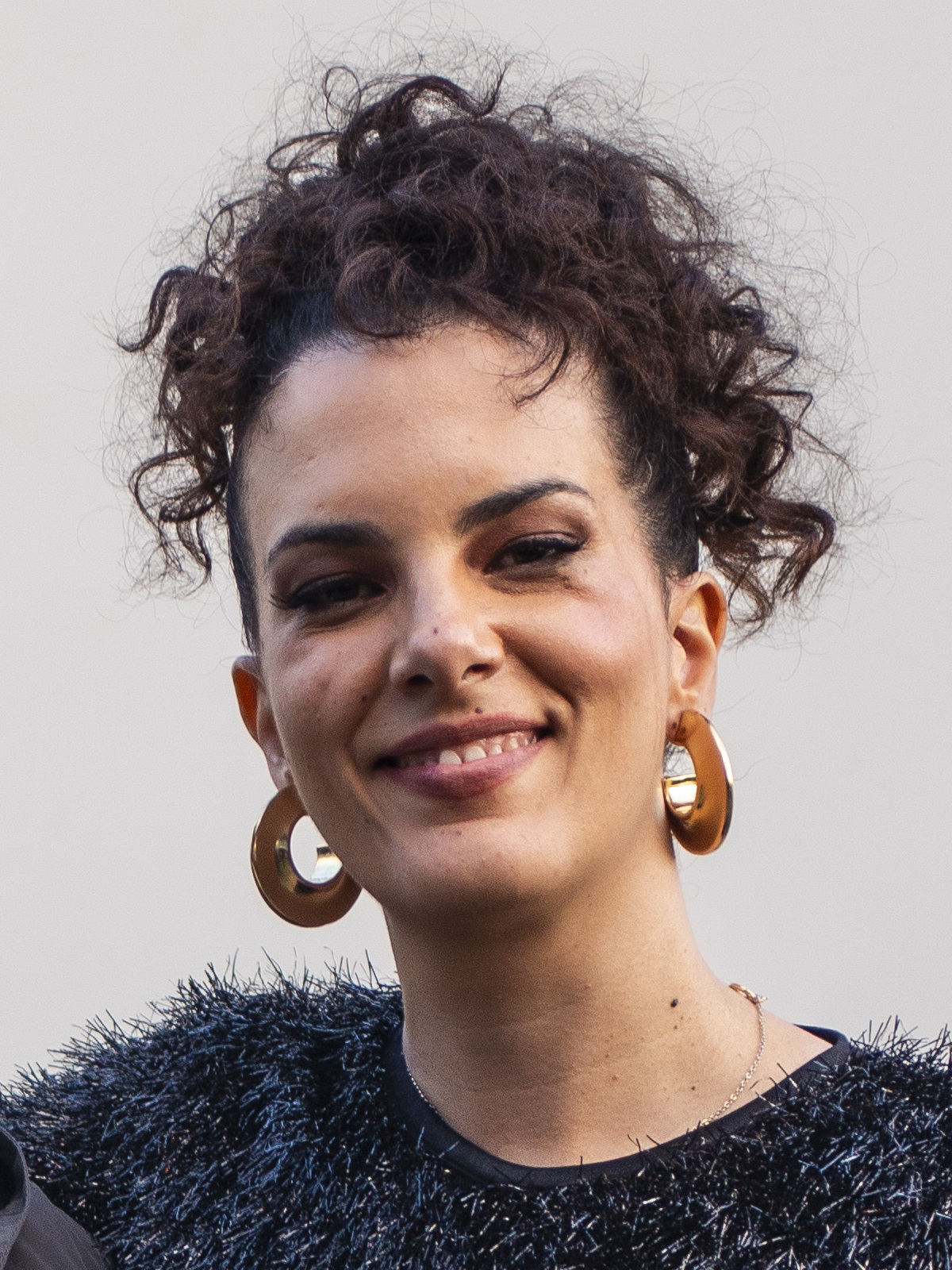
- Céu in 2023

Background information
- Born: Maria do Céu Whitaker Poças; 17 April 1980 (age 46)
- Origin: São Paulo, Brazil
- Genres: MPB, bossa nova, world music, trip hop
- Occupation: Singer-songwriter
- Instruments: Vocals, keyboards, percussion
- Years active: 2002–present
- Labels: Urban Jungle, Six Degrees
- Website: Céu

Maria do Céu Whitaker Poças (born 17 April 1980), known professionally by the mononym Céu (Portuguese pronunciation: [sɛw]), is a Brazilian singer-songwriter whose first American album was released on the Six Degrees Records label in April 2007.

== Early life and education ==
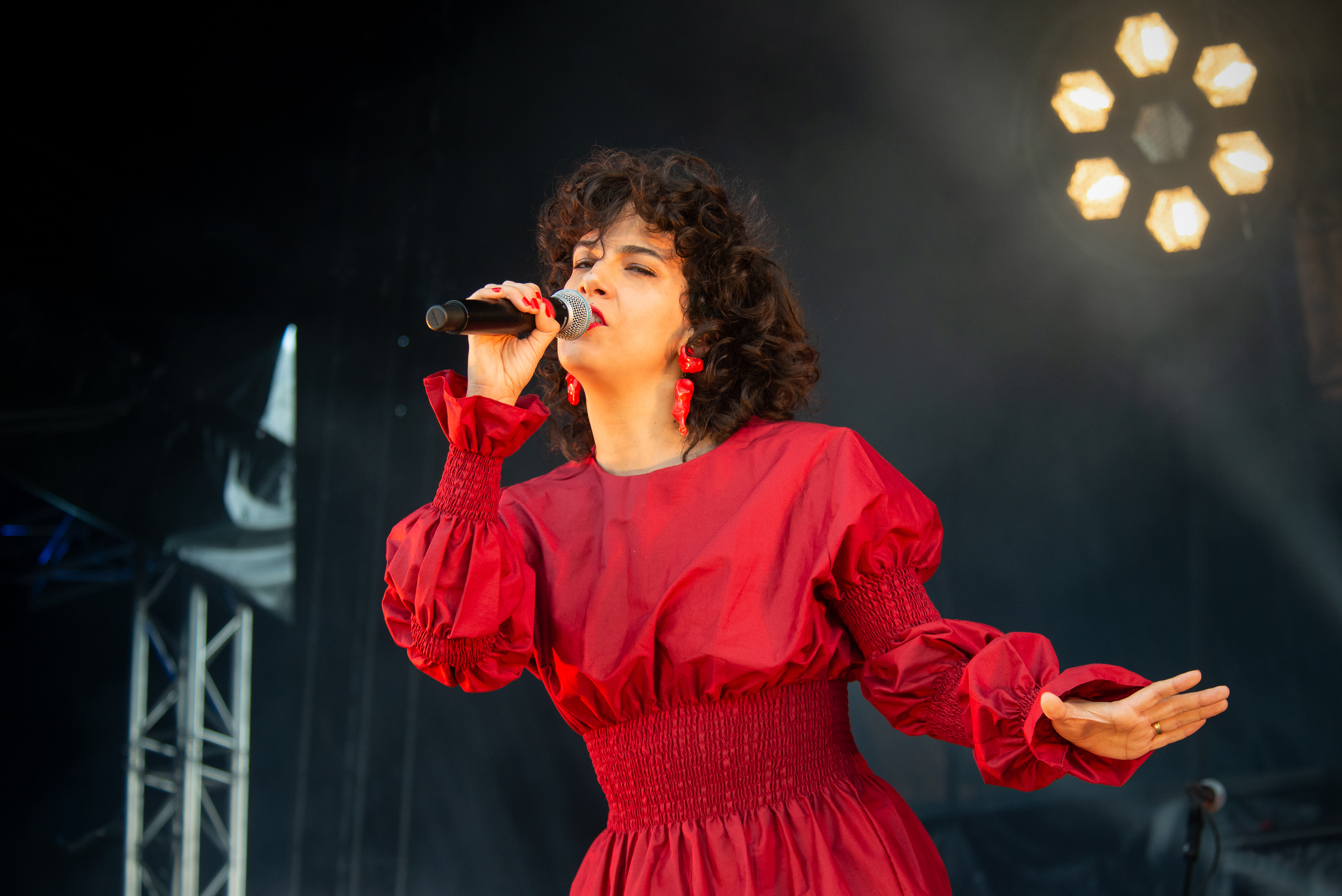
Céu, Saint-Nazaire, 2019.

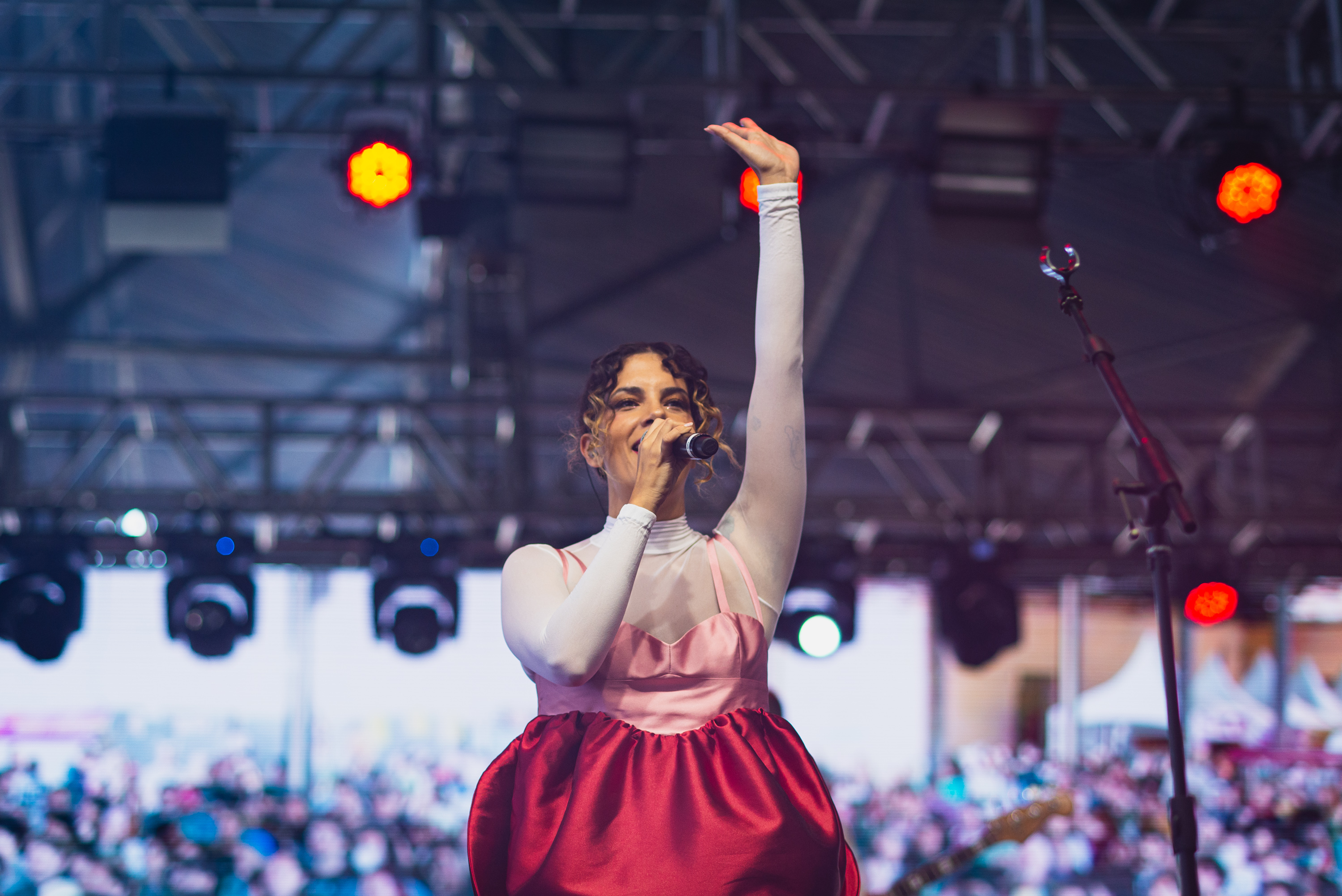
Céu (2022)

Céu was born in São Paulo, Brazil, to a musical family. Her father was a composer, arranger, and musicologist. It was from her father that she learned to appreciate Brazil's classical music composers, particularly Heitor Villa-Lobos, Ernesto Nazaré, and Orlando Silva.

At fifteen, she decided to become a musician and by her late teens, she studied music theory, as well as the violão (a nylon-stringed Brazilian guitar). Her songs reveal many influences, which include samba, salsa, choro, soul, rhythm and blues, hip hop, afrobeat, and electrojazz music. She cites as influences the music of African-Americans Billie Holiday, Ella Fitzgerald, Lauryn Hill, Erykah Badu, and Jorge Ben.

Céu was performing onstage and exploring the repertoire of turn-of-the-century carnival music by her late teens. Soon after that, she relocated temporarily to New York City, where met with fellow Brazilian musician Antônio Pinto, whom she later learned was a distant cousin. Their relationship renewed when he teamed up with lead producer Beto Villares, composer of the musical score for the movie O Ano em Que Meus Pais Saíram de Férias (2007), to help her record her album. Antonio Pinto, who produced Céu's song "Ave Cruz", is the composer of the musical score for two Oscar-nominated films, Central Station (1999) and City of God (2002).

== Career ==
Originally issued in 2005 on the São Paulo-based Urban Jungle, her self-titled debut album Céu was picked up by Six Degrees/Starbucks/Hear Music in the US and UK, JVC in Japan and Harmonia Mundi in France and in the Netherlands. For this album, Céu received a Latin Grammy nomination for "Best New Artist" in 2006 and a Grammy nomination for Best Contemporary World Music Album in 2008.

Céu performed at the opening ceremony of the 2007 Pan American Games.

In 2008, Céu formed the São Paulo collective Sonantes with Brazilian musicians and producers Rica Amabis, Gui Amabis, Pupillo, and Dengue. The song "Malemolência" was featured in the soccer game by EA Sports, FIFA 08.

In 2009, her critically acclaimed second album Vagarosa reached No. 2 on the US Billboard's World Music charts. The album was nominated for a 2010 Latin Grammy Award for Best Brazilian Contemporary Pop Album.

In 2010, Céu was invited by Herbie Hancock to record a version of "Tempo de Amor" for The Imagine Project album. Céu also performed at the Coachella Valley Music and Arts Festival in 2010.

In 2011, she contributed a version of the track "It's a Long Way" in collaboration with Apollo Nove and N.A.S.A. for the Red Hot Organization's most recent charitable album Red Hot + Rio 2. The album is a follow-up to the 1996 Red Hot + Rio. In 2012, Céu received her third Latin Grammy nomination for "Best Contemporary Brazilian Pop Album" for her third album Caravana Sereia Bloom.

Between 2013 and 2014 Céu performed a series of concerts in Brazil to celebrate the 40th Anniversary of the release of Bob Marley and the Wailers' legendary album Catch a Fire.

In 2014, she released her first live DVD/CD entitled Céu – Ao Vivo in Brazil. The concert was filmed in August 2014 in São Paulo and contains 15 tracks in total, including the never before released cover versions of all-time classics "Piel Canela" and "Mais Uma Noite de Amor", behind-the-scenes footage of the band, and more. Céu – Ao Vivo also includes live versions of Céu's greatest hits, "Lenda", "Malemolência", "10 Contados", "Cangote" and "Baile de Ilusão".

In 2016, she released her fourth studio album named Tropix. She received critical acclaim from such publications as The Guardian and The New York Times. She also won, in the same year, her first Latin Grammy in the Best Portuguese Language Contemporary Pop Album category.

Her album APKÁ was considered one of the 25 best Brazilian albums of the second half of 2019 by the São Paulo Association of Art Critics.

Starbucks has promoted her album in its coffeehouses through its Hear Music Debut CD series. She was the first international artist chosen by Starbucks for promotion.

Her album Novela was included in the list of 50 best albums of 2024 by the São Paulo Art Critics Association.

== Personal life ==
Céu (céu) means "sky" and "heaven" in Portuguese.

She is the second cousin of Maria Casadevall.

== Discography ==
- Céu (2005)
- Remixed EP (2007)
- Vagarosa (2009)
- Caravana Sereia Bloom (2012)
- Céu – Ao Vivo (2014)
- Tropix (2016)
- Apká! (2019)
- Acustico (2021)
- Um Gosto de Sol (2021)
- Novela (2024)

== Awards and nominations ==
Year	Awards	Category	Recipient	Outcome	Ref.
2006	Latin Grammy Award	Best New Artist	Céu	Nominated	
2007	MTV Video Music Brazil	Best New Act	Céu	Nominated	
2008	Grammy Award	Best Contemporary World Music Album	CéU	Nominated	
2009	Associação Paulista de Críticos de Arte	Best Female	Céu	Won	
2009	MTV Video Music Brazil	Best MPB Act	Céu	Nominated	
2010	Latin Grammy Award	Brazilian Contemporary Pop Album	Vagarosa	Nominated	
2010	MTV Video Music Brazil	Best MPB Act	Céu	Nominated	
2012	Latin Grammy Award	Best Brazilian Contemporary Pop Album	Caravana Sereia Bloom	Nominated	
2016	Prêmio Multishow	Version of the Year	"Chico Buarque Song"	Won	
2016	Prêmio Multishow	Best Video	"Perfume do Invisível"	Nominated	
2016	Prêmio Multishow	Best Direction	"Perfume do Invisível"	Won	
2016	Prêmio Multishow	Best Photography	"Perfume do Invisível"	Won	
2016	Prêmio Multishow	Song of the Year	"Perfume do Invisível"	Nominated	
2016	Prêmio Multishow	Song of the Year	"Varanda Suspensa"	Nominated	
2016	Prêmio Multishow	Album of the Year	Tropix	Nominated	
2016	Prêmio Multishow	Best Album Recording	Tropix	Won	
2016	Prêmio Multishow	Best Album Cover	Tropix	Nominated	
2016	Latin Grammy Award	Best Portuguese Language Contemporary Pop Album	Tropix	Won	
2016	Latin Grammy Award	Best Engineered Album	Tropix	Won	
2016	Associação Paulista de Críticos de Arte	Artist of the Year	Céu	Won	
2020	Latin Grammy Award	Best Portuguese Language Contemporary Pop Album	Apká!	Won	
