= Roupa Nova em Londres =

Studio album by Roupa Nova
- Released: 2009
- Studios: Abbey Road Studios, London
- Genres: MPB; pop rock
- Length: 56:26 (CD); 58:23 (DVD)
- Label: Roupa Nova Music
- Producer: Roupa Nova

Roupa Nova chronology
4U (2008)	Roupa Nova em Londres (2009)	Roupa Nova 30 Anos ao Vivo (2010)

Roupa Nova em Londres (Portuguese for Roupa Nova in London) is the sixteenth studio album and third DVD by Brazilian pop rock band Roupa Nova, released in March 2009 by Roupa Nova Music, a label created by the band itself. The entire album was recorded at the Abbey Road Studios in London, famous for recordings of the group The Beatles.

The album contains seven new songs: "Do Outro Lado da Calçada", "Reacender (Shine)", "Todas Elas", "Alguém no Teu Lugar", "Mais Feliz", "A Cor do Dinheiro" and "Coração da Terra". It also features four re-workings of old songs: "Sonho", "Muito Mais", "Lembranças" and Lennon–McCartney song "She's Leaving Home", the latter was performed a cappella and captured in a studio installed inside of a cathedral in London, accompanied only by a string octet. The tracks "Toma Conta de Mim", "Cantar Faz Feliz o Coração", "Chamado de Amor" and "Quero Você" were taken from their previous EP 4U, released in 2008.

The DVD version features extra material as the scenes of recordings at Abbey Road, a making of and a rewriting of the song "Lumiar", written by Beto Guedes, a former member of the Clube da Esquina. The album won Latin Grammy Award for Best Brazilian Contemporary Pop Album in 2009.

== Reception ==
Professional ratings
Review scores
Source	Rating
AllMusic	3/5 stars
O Globo	(Positive)
Notas Musicais	2/5 stars

== Track listing ==
No.	Title	Writer(s)	Lead vocals	Length
1.	"Do Outro Lado da Calçada" (From Another Side of the Sidewalk)	Rodrigo Saldanha, Claudio Rabello	Serginho	4:04
2.	"Reacender (Shine)" (Shine)	Jamie Hartman, Kiris Houston, Ricardo Feghali, Nando	Paulinho and Jamie Hartman (featuring Ben's Brother)	3:27
3.	"Todas Elas" (All of Her)	Nando	Nando	3:35
4.	"Cantar Faz Feliz o Coração" (To Sing Makes Heart Happy)	Nando, Feghali	Ricardo Feghali	3:41
5.	"Sonho" (Dream)	Serginho, Nando	Serginho	4:16
6.	"Alguém no teu Lugar" (Someone in Your Stead)	Kiko, Nando, Feghali	Paulinho	2:56
7.	"Muito Mais" (Much More)	Cleberson Horsth, Feghali	Serginho	4:19
8.	"Chamado de Amor" (Love Calling)	Nando, Cleberson Horsth	Paulinho	3:33
9.	"Lembranças" (Memories)	Nando, Feghali	Nando	4:59
10.	"Mais Feliz" (Happier)	Serginho, Feghali	Serginho	3:57
11.	"Quero Você" (I Want You)	Kiko, Feghali	Paulinho	3:41
12.	"She's Leaving Home"	John Lennon, Paul McCartney	Paulinho	3:22
13.	"A Cor do Dinheiro" (The Color of Money)	Nando, Kiko	Paulinho	3:05
14.	"Toma Conta de Mim" (Take Care of Me)	Feghali, Nando	Serginho	3:48
15.	"Coração da Terra" (Earth's Heart)	Nando, Feghali	Serginho	3:42
Total length:				56:26

(DVD Bonus track)
No.	Title	Writer(s)	Lead vocals	Length
16.	"Lumiar" (Lumiar)	Beto Guedes, Ronaldo Bastos	Serginho	1:57
Total length:				58:23
