= Roupa Nova =

Brazilian pop rock band

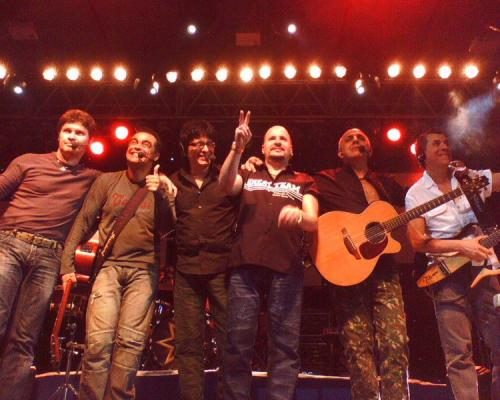

Background information
- Origin: Rio de Janeiro, Brazil
- Genre: Pop rock
- Years active: 1980–present
- Label: Roupa Nova Music
- Members: Kiko; Ricardo Feghali; Cleberson Horsth; Nando; Serginho Herval; Fábio Nestares
- Past members: Paulinho
- Website: roupanova.com.br

Roupa Nova (lit. "New Clothes") is a Brazilian pop rock band, who had many hits in the 1980s and early 1990s. Their sound is often compared to the American band Toto. The band sold over 10 million copies and have 25 hit singles, 10 of them reached #1.

The band was formed in 1970, under the name Os Famks, by keyboard player Cléberson Horsth, bassist Nando, guitarist Kiko and singer Paulinho. With this formation, the band released the single Hoje ainda é dia de Rock (Today is still the day for Rock). In 1975, having changed their name to Os Motokas, they were joined by keyboardist and guitarist Ricardo Feghali and drummer Serginho Herval.

After getting a record deal with Polygram, the band is renamed Roupa Nova ("new clothes" in Portuguese). The name was a suggestion of record producer Mariozinho Rocha. Their accessible yet sophisticated style, making extensive use of vocal harmonies made them a favourite of adult contemporary radio stations. Since the 1980s, Roupa Nova has had many hits in Brazil, such as Sapato Velho (Old Shoe), Anjo (Angel), Whisky-a-Go-Go, Linda Demais (So Beautiful), Volta pra Mim (Come back to me), Coração Pirata (Pirate Heart) and Videogame. They have also composed many themes for telenovelas produced by Globo TV.

Their album Roupa Nova em Londres, released in 2009, was recorded at Abbey Road Studios, London, England. The album won the Latin Grammy in the category Best Brazilian Contemporary Pop Album. On December 14, 2020, the band lost lead singer Paulinho, a victim of COVID-19.

== Band members ==
=== Current members ===
- Kiko – lead guitar, backing vocals (1980–present)
- Ricardo Feghali – keyboards, piano, rhythm guitar, acoustic guitar, backing and occasional lead vocals (1980–present)
- Cleberson Horsth – piano, keyboards, backing vocals (1980–present)
- Nando – bass, backing and occasional lead vocals (1980–present)
- Serginho Herval – drums, lead and backing vocals (1980–present)
- Fábio Nestares – lead and backing vocals, percussion (2021–present), acoustic guitar (2022–present)

=== Former members ===
- Paulinho: lead and backing vocals, percussion (1980–2020; his death)

== Discography ==
=== Studio albums ===
Year	Album	Sales
1981	Roupa Nova (1981)	200,000
1982	Roupa Nova (1982)	220,000
1983	Roupa Nova (1983)	450,000
1984	Roupa Nova (1984)	700,000
1985	Roupa Nova (1985)	2,200,000
1987	Herança	2,000,000
1988	Luz	600,000
1990	Frente e Versos	350,000
1993	De Volta ao Começo	250,000
1994	Vida Vida	250,000
1996	6/1	100,000
1997	Através dos Tempos	150,000
1999	Agora Sim	250,000
2001	Ouro de Minas	180,000
2007	Natal Todo Dia	150,000
2008	4U	100,000
2009	Roupa Nova em Londres	150,000
2016	Todo Amor do Mundo	—
2019	As Novas do Roupa	—
2021	Noite Feliz	—

=== Live albums ===
Year	Album	Sales
1991	Roupa Nova ao Vivo	1,900,000
2004	RoupAcústico	600,000
2006	RoupAcústico 2	435,000
2010	Roupa Nova 30 Anos ao Vivo	100,000
2012	Cruzeiro Roupa Nova	
2023	Roupa Nova 40 Anos	

=== Video albums ===
Year	Album	Sales
2004	RoupAcústico	730,000
2006	RoupAcústico 2	375,000
2009	Roupa Nova em Londres	160,000
2010	Roupa Nova 30 Anos ao Vivo	80,000
2012	Cruzeiro Roupa Nova	
2016	Todo Amor do Mundo	
2023	Roupa Nova 40 Anos	

== Singles ==
=== 1980s ===
Year	Title	Position	Album
Year	Title	BRA Hot 100	Album
1980	"Canção de Verão"	12	Roupa Nova
1981	"Sapato Velho"	7	Roupa Nova
1981	"Bem Simples"	9	Roupa Nova
1981	"Roupa Nova"	15	Roupa Nova
1982	"Clarear"	11	Roupa Nova
1982	"Lumiar"	21	Roupa Nova
1982	"Simplesmente"	33	Roupa Nova
1983	"Anjo"	10	Roupa Nova
1983	"Videogame"	45	Roupa Nova
1983	"Sensual"	41	Roupa Nova
1984	"Chuva de Prata"	1	Roupa Nova
1984	"Whisky a Go Go"	1	Roupa Nova
1985	"Tímida"	3	Roupa Nova
1985	"Dona"	1	Roupa Nova
1985	"Show de Rock'n Roll"	1	Roupa Nova
1985	"Linda Demais"	1	Roupa Nova
1986	"Seguindo no Trem Azul"	1	Roupa Nova
1987	"Volta pra Mim"	1	Herança
1987	"De Volta pro Futuro"	4	Herança
1987	"A Força do Amor"	6	Herança
1988	"Cristina"	7	Herança
1988	"Meu Universo é Você"	1	Luz
1988	"Vício"	1	Luz
1989	"Chama"	5	Luz

=== 1990s ===
Year	Title	Position	Album
Year	Title	BRA Hot 100	Album
1990	"Amo em Silêncio"	19	Frente e Versos
1990	"Esse Tal de Repi en Roll"	57	Frente e Versos
1990	"Coração Pirata"	6	Frente e Versos
1991	"Cartas"	24	Frente e Versos
1991	"Asas do Prazer"	-	Frente e Versos
1991	"Yesterday"	4	Frente e Versos
1991	"Felicidade" (ao vivo)	3	Roupa Nova ao Vivo
1991	"Começo, Meio e Fim" (ao vivo)	1	Roupa Nova ao Vivo
1992	"Clarear"	12	The Best en Español
1992	"Zapato Viejo"	-	The Best en Español
1992	"Yesterday"	-	The Best en Español
1993	"De Volta ao Começo"	-	De Volta ao Começo
1993	"Maria Maria"	56	De Volta ao Começo
1993	"Ando Meio Desligado"	43	De Volta ao Começo
1994	"Os Corações Não São Iguais"	68	Vida Vida
1994	"A Viagem"	1	Vida Vida
1996	"Amar é..."	18	6/1
1997	"De Ninguém"	53	Através dos Tempos
1998	"Muito Mais"	66	Através dos Tempos
1999	"Bem Maior"	33	Agora Sim
1999	"Agora Sim"	15	Agora Sim

=== 2000s ===
Ano	Título	Parada musical	Álbum
Ano	Título	BRA Hot 100	Álbum
2001	"Amor de Índio"	35	Ouro de Minas
2001	"O Sal da Terra"	43	Ouro de Minas
2004	"À Flor da Pele" (acústico) (ao vivo)	50	RoupAcústico
2005	"Razão de Viver" (acústico) (ao vivo)	25	RoupAcústico
2005	"A Lenda" (acústico) (ao vivo)	25	RoupAcústico
2005	"Dona" (acústico) (ao vivo)	8	RoupAcústico
2006	"A Metade da Maçã" (acústico) (ao vivo)	41	RoupAcústico 2
2006	"Um Sonho a Dois" (acústico) (ao vivo)	35	RoupAcústico 2
2006	"Flagra" (acústico) (ao vivo)	29	RoupAcústico 2
2007	"Sensual" (acústico) (ao vivo)	55	RoupAcústico 2
2007	"Um Anjo Muito Especial"	-	Natal Todo Dia
2007	"A Paz"	63	Natal Todo Dia
2008	"Toma Conta de Mim"	-	4U (For You)
2009	"Reacender"	27	Roupa Nova em Londres
2009	"Cantar Faz Feliz o Coração"	-	Roupa Nova em Londres
2009	"Mais Feliz"	-	Roupa Nova em Londres

=== 2010s ===
Year	Title	Position	Album
Year	Title	BRA Hot 100	Album
2010	"Do Outro Lado da Calçada"	-	Roupa Nova em Londres
2010	"Chuva de Prata" (ao vivo)	13	Roupa Nova 30 Anos ao Vivo
2011	"Todas Elas" (ao vivo)	-	Roupa Nova 30 Anos ao Vivo
2012	"Frisson"	71	Cruzeiro Roupa Nova
2014	"Meu Sentimento Voa Muito Mais"	-	Roupa Nova Music
2014	"Ser Melhor"	-	Roupa Nova Music
2015	"É Tempo de Amar"	-	Todo Amor do Mundo
2016	"Contato"	11	Todo Amor do Mundo
2018	"Seja Bem Vindo (O Amor)"	-	As Novas do Roupa
2019	"Destino o Casualidad (Destino ou Acaso)"	-	As Novas do Roupa
2019	"Noites Traiçoeiras"	-	Noite Feliz
