= Caravana Sereia Bloom =

Studio album by Céu
- Released: February 13, 2012 (Brazil)
- Recorded: Estúdios Totem, Toca do Calvo, Ambulante Studios, and Instituto Studio, São Paulo
- Genre: Tropicália, bossa nova
- Length: 35:24
- Label: UJ Publishing, VV Music Publishing, Six Degrees Music
- Producer: Gui Amabis, Céu

Céu chronology
Vagarosa (2009)	Caravana Sereia Bloom (2012)	Tropix (2016)

Caravana Sereia Bloom is the third studio album by Brazilian singer-songwriter Céu. It was released in 2012 worldwide.

== Track listing ==
No.	Title	Writer(s)	Length
1.	"Falta de Ar"	Gui Amabis	3:59
2.	"Amor de Antigos"	Céu	2:56
3.	"Asfalto e Sal"	Céu	2:55
4.	"Retrovisor"	Céu	3:49
5.	"Teju Na Estrada"	Amabis	0:53
6.	"Contravento"	Amabis; Lucas Santtana	2:41
7.	"Palhaço"	Nelson Cavaquinho; Oswaldo Martins	2:06
8.	"You Won't Regret It"	Glenmore Brown; Lloyd Robinson	3:16
9.	"Sereia"	Céu	0:42
10.	"Baile de Ilusão"	Céu	3:14
11.	"Fffree"	Céu	1:07
12.	"Streets Bloom"	Santtana	4:31
13.	"Chegar em Mim"	Jorge dü Peixe	3:21

== Personnel ==
Credits for Caravana Sereia Bloom adapted from liner notes.

Musicians

- Céu – vocals (all tracks), organ (tracks 4 and 11), electronic drums (track 4), programming (track 9), guitar (track 11), bass guitar (track 11)
- Gui Amabis – programming (tracks 1, 2, 3, 5, 6, 7, 8, 10, and 12), guitar (tracks 4, 5, and 10), keyboards (tracks 3, 8, and 10), bass guitar (tracks 2 and 5), vibraphone (track 1)
- Dustan Gallas – guitar (tracks 2, 4, 6, 8, and 12), keyboards (tracks 2, 3, 6, and 12), piano (track 8), vibraphone (track 2), wurlitzer (track 1)
- Negresko Sis – backing vocals (tracks 3 and 8)
- Edgard Poças – acoustic guitar (track 7)
- Pupillo – drums (tracks 1, 2, 3, 6, and 13)
- Bruno Buarque – drums (tracks 4 and 8)
- Fernando Catatau – guitar (track 1)
- Curumin – drums (tracks 10 and 12)
- Dengue – bass guitar (tracks 3 and 6)
- Thiago Franca – tenor saxophone (tracks 6 and 10)
- Nahor Gomes – flugelhorn (tracks 8 and 10), trumpet (track 8)
- Lúcio Maia – guitar (track 13)
- Lucas Martins – bass guitar (tracks 1, 4, 8, 10, 12, and 13)

Production

- Gui Amabis – engineering, production
- Simon Simantob – production coordination
- Felipe Tichauer – mastering
- Yuri Kalil – engineering
- Breno Kruse – production coordination
- Gustavo Lenza – engineering, mixing
- Rica Amabis production, programming
- André Bourgeois – executive producer
