= Urban Jungle (record label) =

Brazilian independent record label

- Founded: 2000
- Founder: André Bourgeois
- Genre: Brazilian / Electronic / Rap / Rock / Samba / Funk / Jazz
- Country of origin: Brazil
- Location: São Paulo, SP
- Official website: http://www.urbanjungle.com.br

Urban Jungle is an artist management company, music publishing company, booking agency and independent record label based in São Paulo, Brazil, inspired by the local Brazilian urban music scene, it has been releasing albums and representing artists like Céu, Teto Preto, Otto and Edgar among others worldwide.

== Artist roster ==
- Céu
- Otto
- Boogarins
- Edgar
- Teto Preto

== See also ==
- List of record labels
