= Anavitória =

Brazilian musical duo

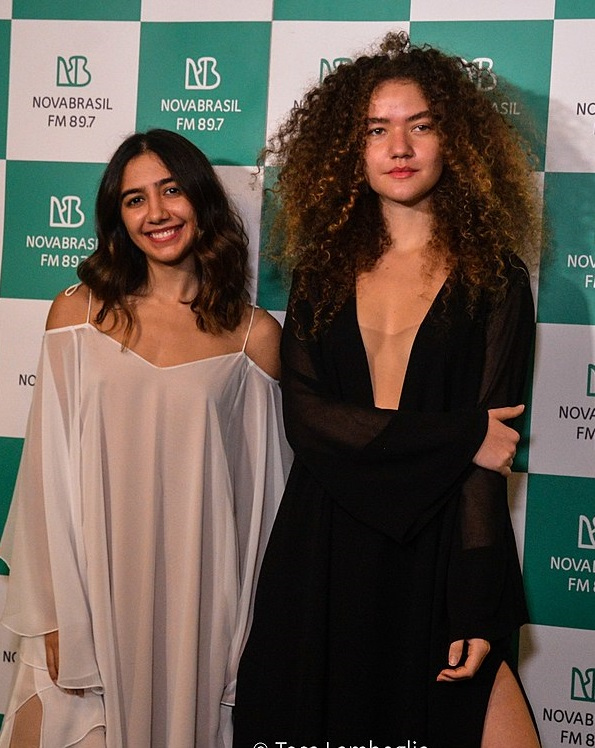
- Ana (left) and Vitória (right) in October 2018

Background information
- Origin: Araguaína, Tocantins, Brazil
- Genres: Pop, folk
- Years active: 2015–present
- Label: Universal
- Members: Ana Caetano; Vitória Falcão

Anavitória (Brazilian Portuguese: /ɐnɐviˈtɔɾjɐ/) is a Brazilian musical duo consisting of Ana Clara Caetano Costa and Vitória Fernandes Falcão. Formed in 2015, Anavitória debuted with an EP produced by Tiago Iorc after being discovered by Iorc's then manager Felipe Simas. They have released a total of four albums, two of which were nominated for Best Contemporary Pop Album at the Grammys. The duo have worked with multiple artists in the Brazilian music scene including Nando Reis and Rita Lee.

== History ==
=== 2014–2015 ===
Both Caetano and Falcão studied in the same school in Araguaína, so they met and started recording covers for YouTube. One of the songs they recorded was "Um Dia Após o Outro" by Tiago Iorc and they sent it to the artist's manager Felipe Simas. So Iorc created the label "Forasteiro" in partnership with his manager to launch outstanding artists. Iorc produced the duo's first EP that was released on April 2, 2015.

=== 2016–present ===
After the success with the songs from the debut EP and the single "Singular", the duo launched a crowdfunding project for them released their debut album titled Anavitória. After the debut album the duo started their first tour through various cities in Brazil. Their song "Agora Eu Quero Ir" was featured in the soundtrack of Brazilian telenovela Malhação.

The duo's third studio album was released on November 29, 2019, titled N. The album consists of recordings of songs by Brazilian singer Nando Reis.

== Personal Lives ==
Vitória has responded to speculation about her and Ana's sexualities by saying: "I am totally secure in my sexuality, and Ana in hers. We do not talk about whether we are straight or gay, we simply do not talk about that. The work that we have to deliver to the public is so huge! Why is it more important to know whom I kiss or whom I date?"

== Ana e Vitória ==
On August 7, 2018, the film Ana e Vitória was released. The movie followed the beginning of the duo's relationship and the forming of their band. Ana and Vitória played the roles of themselves in the film. Ana e Vitória was directed by Matheus Souza.

== Discography ==
=== Studio albums ===
List of albums, with selected chart positions, sales figures, and certifications
Title	Album details	Peak chart positions	Certifications
Title	Album details	BRA	Certifications
Anavitória	Released: August 19, 2016; Formats: CD, digital download; Label: Forasteiro, Universal	6	PMB: Diamond
O Tempo É Agora	Released: August 3, 2018; Formats: CD, digital download; Label: Forasteiro, Universal		PMB: Diamond
N	Released: November 29, 2019; Formats: digital download; Label: Universal		PMB: Gold
Cor	Released : January 1, 2021; Formats: digital download; Label: Anavitória Artes		PMB: 3× Platinum
Esquinas	Released : December 12, 2024; Formats: digital download; Label: Anavitória Artes		PMB: Gold

== Film ==
year	Title	Role	Note
2018	Ana e Vitória	Ana Clara Caetano, Vitória Falcão	7.4/10 - IMDb

== Awards and nominations ==
Year	Award	Category	Work	Result	Ref.
2017	Latin Grammy Award	Best Portuguese Language Contemporary Pop Album	Anavitória	Nominated	
2017	Latin Grammy Award	Best Portuguese Language Song	"Trevo (Tu)" (with Tiago Iorc)	Won	
2019	Latin Grammy Award	Best Portuguese Language Contemporary Pop Album	O Tempo É Agora	Won	
2020	Latin Grammy Award	Best Portuguese Language Contemporary Pop Album	N	Nominated	
2021	Latin Grammy Award	Best Portuguese Language Contemporary Pop Album	Cor	Won	
2021	Latin Grammy Award	Best Portuguese Language Song	"Lisboa" (with Lenine)	Won	
