= Tiago Iorc =

Brazilian singer-songwriter and producer

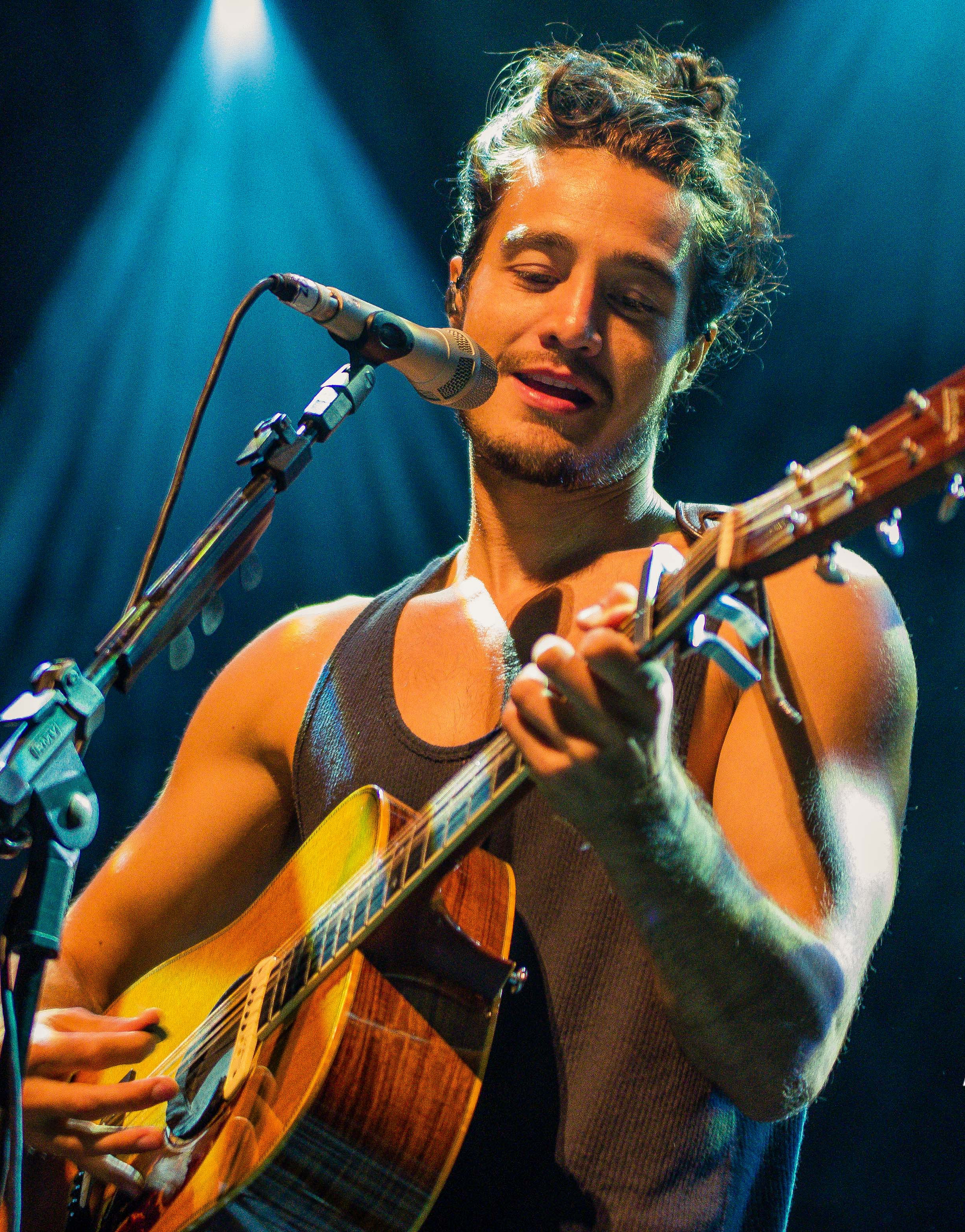
- Iorc, January 2017

Background information
- Born: Tiago Iorczeski; 28 November 1985 (age 40)
- Origin: Brasília, Federal District, Brazil
- Occupations: Singer, songwriter
- Instruments: vocals, acoustic guitar, piano
- Years active: 2003–present
- Label: Som Livre (2008–present)

Tiago Iorczeski (born 28 November 1985) is a Brazilian singer-songwriter and record producer. As a child, he lived in England and in the United States. Despite having no musical background in his family, Tiago started playing the acoustic guitar at age 8.

In 2007 his single "Nothing but a Song" gained popularity and led to the release of his debut album Let Yourself In, which gained fame after several of Tiago's songs were featured on Brazilian primetime soap operas, TV ads, and films. Tiago started touring across the country, and in 2009, was the opening act on Jason Mraz's Brazilian Tour.

Let Yourself In was released in Japan, where "Nothing but a Song" peaked at number 11 on Billboard's Japan HOT 100 Chart, and in South Korea, where the public granted Tiago a Best Foreign Artist Award for his performance at the 2010 Grand Mint Festival. The same year, the single "Fine" was featured on the popular South Korean TV series Personal Taste.

His second studio album Umbilical had New York–based Andy Chase as producer and was simultaneously released in Brazil, South Korea and Portugal in October 2011. Digital releases in the United States and Japan followed.

The Umbilical Tour had its debut on March 14 at the 2012 South by Southwest Music Festival in Austin, Texas, and included performances in Portugal and Brazil.

== Background ==
Iorc's family moved to Cambridge, England, when he was 10 months old, and Britain became his home for the first years of his life. He was 8 when he began playing the acoustic guitar.

=== 2001–2012: Umbilical ===
Tiago teamed with New York–based Andy Chase for the production of Umbilical.

Chase—who had worked with groups such as The Smashing Pumpkins, Tahiti 80, and The Divine Comedy—pre-produced Tiago's album, then met with him in Rio de Janeiro for recording sessions. After two weeks finishing basic tracks with the band, they headed to New York City for final recording and mixing at Stratosphere Sound—recording studio Chase co-owns with former Smashing Pumpkins guitarist James Iha and Fountains of Wayne band member Adam Schlesinger.

"It was Tiago's voice that first drew me in. I had only heard a few songs from his debut album but there was a fragility and honesty in his voice that I connected with. I intentionally didn't study that album too much once I knew we were going to work together because I didn't want to feel I had rules about what genre to keep him in, or what production constraints we had to adhere to based on that first effort. I could sense there was immense potential in Tiago and his band, but I wanted to move them away from that clean, careful sound and see the music evolve towards something darker, grittier and more complex, which I felt would make his unusual voice stand out even that much more. Tiago is both a classic and a contemporary soul – combining the best of singers like Nick Drake and bands like Radiohead. I hope people can enjoy getting as caught up in the mastery of his lyrics and his beautiful, textural voice as I have". — Andy Chase

Umbilical was mastered at Sterling Sound by Ted Jensen and released in October 2011.

His album Reconstrução was considered one of the 25 best Brazilian albums of the first half of 2019 by the São Paulo Association of Art Critics.

== Discography ==
=== Studio albums ===
List of studio albums, with selected chart positions
Title	Album details
Let Yourself In	Released: April 20, 2008; Label: SLAP; Format: CD, Digital download
Umbilical	Released: October 10, 2011; Label: SLAP; Format: CD, digital download
Zeski	Released: July 29, 2013; Label: SLAP; Format: CD, digital download
Troco Likes	Released: July 10, 2015; Label: SLAP; Format: CD, digital download
Reconstrução	Released: May 5, 2019; Label: Iorc Produções, Universal Music; Format: Digital download, streaming

=== Compilations ===
Year	Title	Album details
2015	Novelas	Released: May 18, 2015; Label: Som Livre; Format: Digital Download

=== Singles ===
List of singles as lead artist, with selected chart positions and certifications, showing year released and album name
Title	Year	Peak chart positions		Album
Title	Year	JPN Hot	KOR	Album
"Nothing but a Song"	2007	11	—	Let Yourself In
"Scared"	2008	—	—	Let Yourself In
"No One There" (promo)	2008	—	—	Let Yourself In
"Blame"	2008	—	—	Let Yourself In
"My Girl"	2009	—	—	Let Yourself In
"Fine"	2010	—	51	Let Yourself In
"Story of a Man"	2011	—	—	Umbilical
"—" denotes a recording that did not chart or was not released in that territory.

== Awards and nominations ==
Year	Award	Category	Work	Result
2016	Latin Grammy	Best Portuguese Language Contemporary Pop Album	Troco Likes	Nominated
2016	Latin Grammy	Best Portuguese Language Song	"Amei Te Ver"	Nominated
2017	Latin Grammy	Best Portuguese Language Contemporary Pop Album	Troco Likes Ao Vivo	Won
2017	Latin Grammy	Best Portuguese Language Song	"Trevo (Tu)" (with Ana Caetano)	Won
2019	Latin Grammy	Song of the Year	"Desconstrução"	Nominated
2019	Latin Grammy	Best Portuguese Language Song	"Desconstrução"	Won
