= List of songs recorded by Ludmilla =

Brazilian R&B singer Ludmilla has recorded songs for fifteen studio albums, including a soundtrack and four Pagode albums, as well as two compilations, a greatest hits, a remix album and an extended play (EP).

== Songs ==
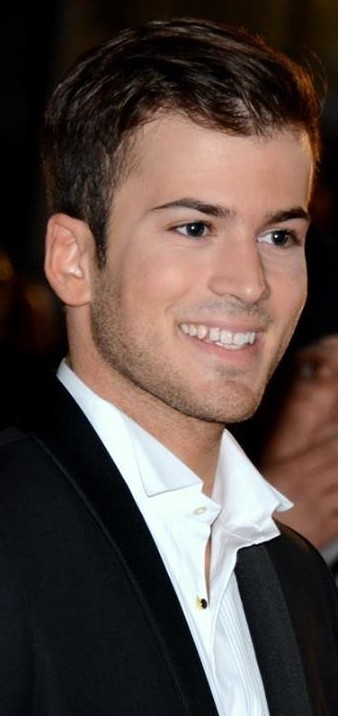
David Carreira (pictured) collaborated with Ludmilla on "Vamos com Tudo".

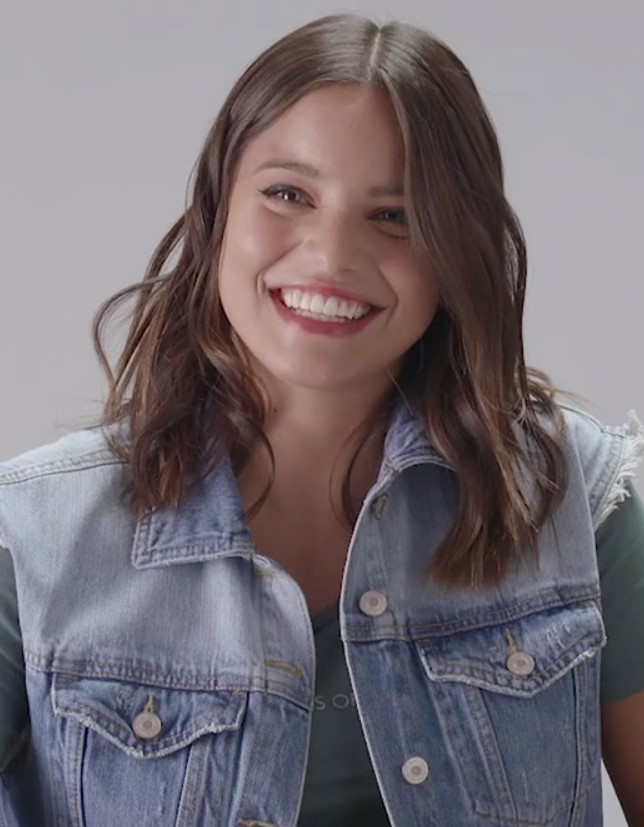
Emilia (pictured) collaborated with Ludmilla on "No Se Ve".

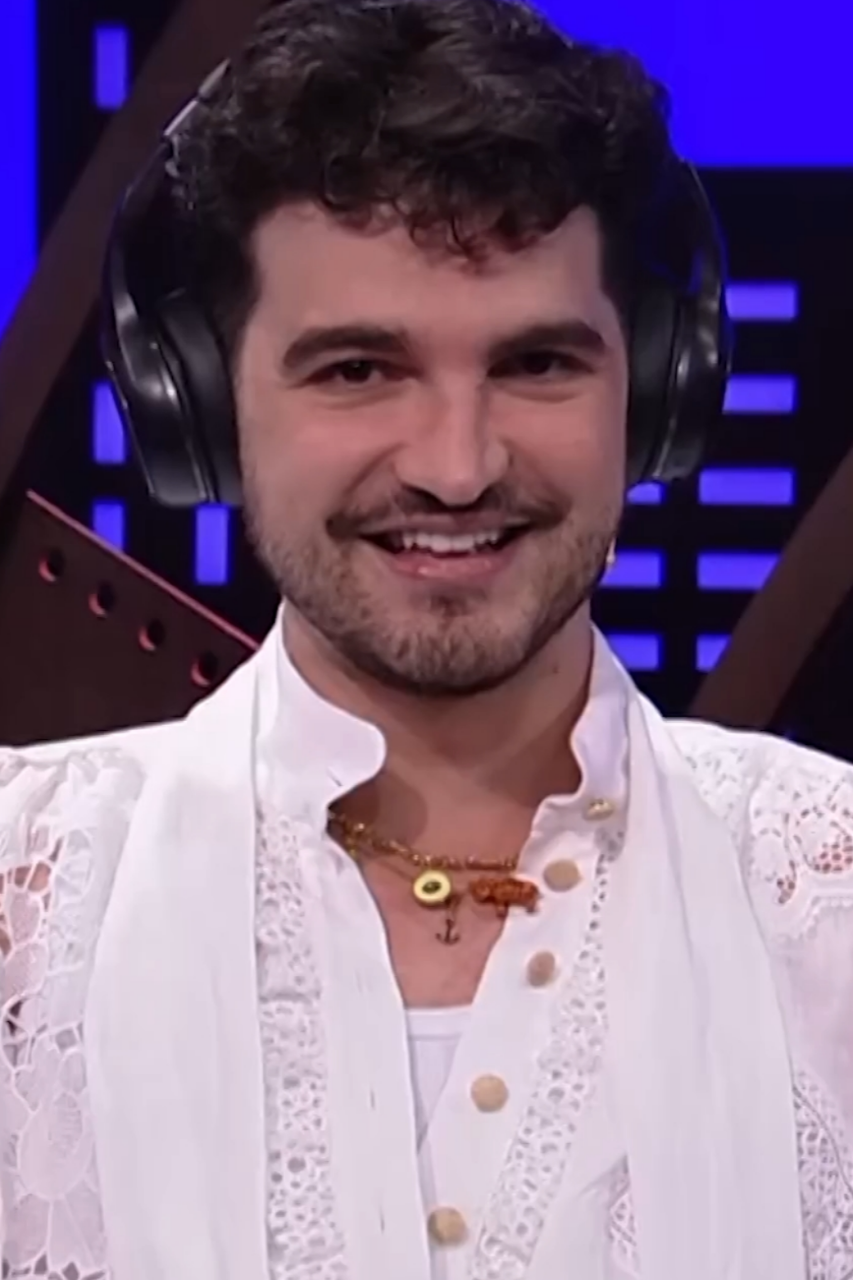
Jão (pictured) collaborated with Ludmilla on "A Boba Fui Eu", from Ludmilla's second studio album Hello Mundo.

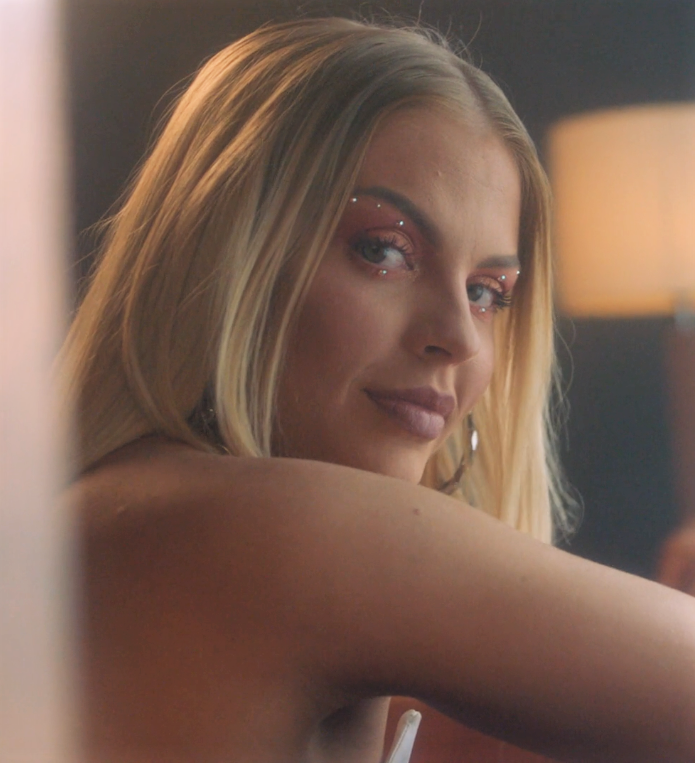
Luísa Sonza (pictured) collaborated with Ludmilla on "Com Que Roupa", "Café da Manhã" and "Medley Lud Session".

Key
†	Indicates songs covered by Ludmilla
‡	Indicates song written solely by Ludmilla

Song	Artist(s)	Writer(s)	Album(s)	Year	Ref.
"212"	Ludmilla	Ludmilla ‡	Numanice 2	2022	
"5 Contra 1"	Ludmilla with Dallass	Ludmilla ‡	Vilã	2023	
"700 por Hora"	Ludmilla	Ludmilla ‡	Hello Mundo	2019	
"A Boba Fui Eu"	Ludmilla with Jão	Ludmilla; Jefferson Junior; Umberto Tavares	Hello Mundo	2019	
"Amor Difícil"	Ludmilla	Ludmilla ‡	Numanice	2020	
"Apê 1001"	BIN with Ludmilla, Dallass	Luan Luís Neves de Oliveira; Ludmilla; Matheus Figueiredo	Dono das Esquinas	2021	
"Brigas Demais"	Ludmilla with Delacruz, Gaab	Alan; Delacruz; Fabinho Rodrigues; Gabriel Amaral; Leonardo Cordeiro; Ludmilla	Vilã	2023	
"Cabelo Cacheado"	Ludmilla	Ludmilla ‡	Numanice 2	2022	
"Café da Manhã"	Luísa Sonza with Ludmilla	Luísa Sonza; Ludmilla; Douglas Moda; Caio Paiva; Victor Ferreira; Hodari; Luccas Carlos	Doce 22	2022	
"Caça e Caçador"	Ludmilla	Ludmilla ‡	Non-album single		
"Cigana"	Ludmilla with Delacruz	Clau; Delacruz; Gabrieu; Kevin; Luccas Carlos	Numanice 2 Ao Vivo	2022	
"Cobra Venenosa"	Ludmilla	Ludmilla ‡	Non-album single		
"Com que Roupa" † (originally by Noel Rosa)	Luan Santana, Luísa Sonza, Cléo featuring Ludmilla	Noel Rosa	Non-album single	2018	
"Deixa de Onda (Porra Nenhuma)"	Dennis with Ludmilla, Xamã	Cantini; Dennis; Gabriel de Ângelo; Geizon Fernandes	Non-album single	2021	
"De Rolê"	Ludmilla with Ferrugem	Ludmilla; Jefferson Junior; Umberto Tavares	Hello Mundo	2019	
Desce com Maldade, Sobe com Autoridade	Ludmilla with Simone & Simaria	Ludmilla; Nivardo Paz; Rafinha RSQ; Simaria	Hello Mundo	2019	
"Ela Não"	Ludmilla	Ludmilla ‡	Numanice Ao Vivo	2021	
"Espelho"	Ludmilla	Jefferson Junior; Toninho Aguiar; Umberto Tavares	Hello Mundo	2019	
"Eu Estive Aqui"	Ludmilla	Ludmilla; Jefferson Junior; Umberto Tavares	Numanice 2	2022	
"Eu Só Sinto Raiva"	Ludmilla with Ariel Donato	Donato; Ludmilla	Vilã	2023	
"Favela Chegou"	Ludmilla with Anitta	André Vieira; Pedro Breder; Tállia; Wallace Vianna	Hello Mundo	2019	
"Faz uma Loucura por Mim"	Ludmilla				
"Flash"	Ludmilla	Donato Verissimo; Gleyce Degan; Jefferson Junior; Ludmilla; Umberto Tavares	Hello Mundo	2019	
"Fora de Si"	Ludmilla	Ludmilla ‡	Numanice 2	2022	
"Fuego Del Calor"	Scott Storch with Papatinho, Ludmilla featuring Ozuna, Tyga	Alexis Gotay; Curtis Jackson; Ozuna; Jean Pierre Soto Pascual; Jefferson Junior; Ludmilla	Non-album single	2020	
"Garota Nota 100" † (originally by MC Marcinho)	Ludmilla	Michael Sullivan; Paulo Massadas	Non-album single	2023	
"Gato Siamês"	Ludmilla with Xamã	Geizon Fernandes; Ludmilla; Salve Malak	Non-album single	2021	
"Gostosa com Intensidade"	Ludmilla	Ludmilla ‡	Vilã	2023	
"Insegurança"	Pixote with Ludmilla	Waltinho Jota	Trintou Ao Vivo	2023	
"Insônia"	Ludmilla with Marília Mendonça	Ludmilla; Jefferson Junior; Umberto Tavares	Numanice 2 Ao Vivo	2022	
"Invocada"	Ludmilla with Léo Santana	Ludmilla; Jefferson Junior; Umberto Tavares	Hello Mundo	2019	
"Já Tentei"	Vou pro Sereno with Ludmilla				
"Maria Maria" † (originally by Milton Nascimento)	Ludmilla	Fernando Brant; Milton Nascimento	Non-album single	2022	
"Make Love"	Ludmilla	Ludmilla ‡	Vilã	2023	
"Maldivas"	Ludmilla	Ludmilla ‡	Numanice 2	2022	
"Malvadona"	Ludmilla with Oruam, Vulgo FK	Ludmilla; Oruam; Vulgo FK	Vilã	2023	
"Mande um Sinal"	Ludmilla				
"Maria Joana"	Ludmilla	Ludmilla ‡	Numanice 2	2022	
"Me Arrepender"	Ludmilla	Bruno Gabryel; Ludmilla	Numanice 2	2022	
"Me Deixa Ir"	Ludmilla	Ludmilla; Jefferson Junior; Umberto Tavares	Vilã	2023	
"Medley Lud Session"	Ludmilla with Luísa Sonza	Luísa Sonza; Ludmilla; André Jordão; Caio Paiva; Carol Biazin; Day Limns; Douglas Moda; Hodari; Jefferson Junior; Luccas Carlos; MC Kevin; Umberto Tavares; Vitão	Non-album single	2022	
"Meu Desapego"	Ludmilla	Ludmilla; Jefferson Junior; Umberto Tavares	Numanice 2	2022	
"Meu Homem é seu Homem"	Ludmilla	Ludmilla ‡	Numanice 2	2022	
"Nasci Pra Vencer"	Ludmilla with Dallass	Ludmilla ‡	Vilã	2023	
"Não é por Maldade"	Ludmilla with Sorriso Maroto	Ludmilla ‡	Numanice Ao Vivo	2021	
"Não vá me Enganar"	Ludmilla with Belo				
"Ninguém Merece Amar Sozinho"	Sorriso Maroto with Ludmilla				
"No Se Ve"	Emilia with Ludmilla	Mauro Ezequiel Lombardo; Emilia Mernes; Ludmilla Oliveira; Francisco Zecca	Non-album single	2023	
"Onda Diferente"	Anitta with Ludmilla, Snoop Dogg featuring Papatinho	Ludmilla; Calvin Broadus	Kisses	2019	
"Otra Vez" (remix)	Zion & Lennox with Ludmilla	Alejandro Ramírez Suárez; Félix Ortiz; Gabriel Pizarro; José Balvín; Jeferson Junior; Lennox; Rene Cano; Umberto Tavares	Non-album single	2017	
"Perfume"	Ludmilla				
"Poesia Acústica 10: Recomeçar"	Ludmilla				
"Quem é Você"	Ludmilla	Ludmilla; Rafael Castilhol	Numanice 2	2022	
"Rainha da Favela"	Ludmilla	Ludmilla; Pablo Repetto; Rolando Cabrera; Romulo Melo	Non-album single	2020	
"Ritmo do Crime"	Filipe Ret with Dallass, Ludmilla	Filipe Faria; Matheus Figueiredo; Ludmilla; Maru2d	Non-album single	2023	
"Senta e Levanta"	Ludmilla with Stefflon Don, Topo La Maskara	Ludmilla Oliveira; Helder Villas Boas; Stephanie Allen; Topo La Maskara	Vilã	2023	
"Sinais de Fogo"	Ludmilla with Péricles	Ludmilla; Jefferson Junior; Umberto Tavares	Numanice 2 Ao Vivo	2022	
"Socadona"	Ludmilla with Mariah Angeliq, Topo La Maskara featuring Mr. Vegas	Ludmilla Oliveira; Carolina Isabel Colón; Clifford Smith; Helder Vilas Boas; Jefferson Junior; Juan Jose Brito Castillo; Angelique; Umberto Tavares	Vilã	2023	
"Solteiras Shake"	Ludmilla with Gabriel do Borel	Ludmilla Oliveira; Marcel "Mars" Korkutata; Rasool Diaz; Shane Lindstrom; Tyson "Zone" Kong	Vilã	2023	
"Sou Má"	Ludmilla with Ajaxx, Tasha & Tracie	Beyoncé; Brittany Coney; Denisia Andrews; Flávio Castro; Ludmilla Oliveira; Pharrell Williams; Shawn Carter; Tasha Okereke; Tracie Okereke	Vilã	2023	
"Tanto Faz"	MC Cabelinho with Ludmilla	Ludmilla; Victor Hugo Nascimento	Little Love	2022	
"Teu Segredo"	Ludmilla with Júlio Sereno				
"Todo Mundo Louco"	Ludmilla with Capo Plaza, Tropkillaz, Ape Drums	Ape Drums; Luca D'Orso; Laudz; Ludmilla; Zegon	Vilã	2023	
"Tudo Porque Você Mentiu"	Ludmilla	Ludmilla ‡	Hello Mundo	2019	
"Vai e Volta"	Ludmilla	Ludmilla; Jefferson Junior; Umberto Tavares	Hello Mundo	2019	
"Vai Sentando"	Skrillex featuring Ludmilla, King Doudou, Duki	Ludmilla Oliveira; Hugo Passaquin; Mauro Ezequiel Lombardo; Mohamed Echchatibi; Sonny Moore	Fast X (soundtrack)	2023	
"Vamos com Tudo"	David Carreira with Ludmilla, Giulia Be featuring Preto Show	Bruno Sucesso; Carlos Danda Songo; David Carreira; Deejay Telio; Freek Kempen Van; Giulia Marinho; Laurent Lavergne; Mr. Marley; Nuno Ribeiro; Sara Carreira	Oyto	2021	
"Vem por Cima"	Ludmilla with Piso 21	Ludmilla; Rafael Castilhol; David Escobar; David Lorduy; Juan David Huertas Clavijo; Pablo Mejia Barmudez	Vilã	2023	
"Verdinha"	Ludmilla with Topo La Maskara, Walshy Fire	Helder Vilas Boas; Juan José Brito Castillo; Leighton Walsh; Ludmilla	Non-album single	2019	
"Vida"	Matheus Fernandes with Ludmilla	Luan Pereira; Mateus Félix; Rapha Soares	MF no Rio, Vol.1 Ao Vivo	2023	
"Zangadinha"	Tiago Iorc with Ludmilla	Duda Rodrigues; Tiago Iorc	Non-album single	2023	

== See also ==
- Ludmilla discography
