= Ludmilla discography =

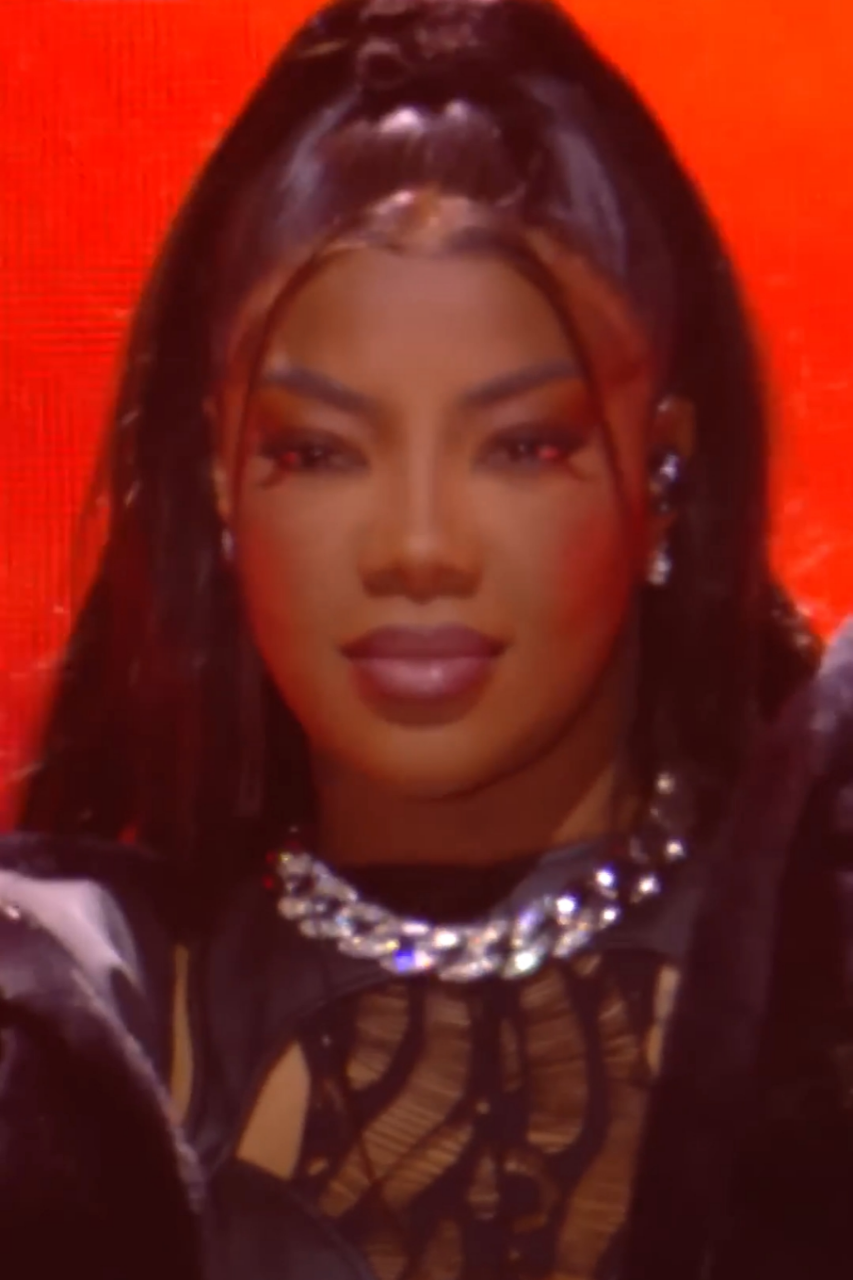
- Ludmilla in 2022
- Studio albums: 6
- EPs: 2
- Live albums: 4
- Singles: 43
- Music videos: 20

This is the discography of Ludmilla, a Brazilian singer-songwriter, comprising two studio albums, two extended plays, twenty singles and a range of music videos. In early 2014, she signed to Warner Music Brazil, and removed the "MC" name before releasing her first album with the label.

== Albums ==
=== Studio albums ===
List of studio albums, with selected details
| Title | Album details | Certifications |
|---|---|---|
| Hoje | Released: August 26, 2014; Formats: CD, digital download, streaming; Label: Warner Music | |
| A Danada Sou Eu | Released: October 21, 2016; Formats: CD, digital download, streaming; Label: Warner Music | |
| Hello Mundo | Released: August 9, 2019; Formats: CD, digital download, streaming; Label: Warner Music | |
| Numanice 2 | Released: January 26, 2022; Formats: Digital download, streaming; Label: Warner Music | Pro-Música Brasil: Gold |
| Vilã | Released: March 24, 2023; Formats: Digital download, streaming; Label: Warner Music | |
| Fragmentos | Released: November 6, 2025; Formats: Digital download, streaming; Label: Warner Music | |

=== Live albums ===
List of live albums, with selected details
| Title | Album details | Certifications |
|---|---|---|
| Hello Mundo: Ao Vivo | Released: May 31, 2019; Formats: CD, digital download; Label: Warner Music | PMB: 2× Platinum |
| Numanice: Ao Vivo | Released: February 29, 2021; Formats: CD, digital download; Label: Warner Music | PMB: Platinum |
| Numanice 2: Ao Vivo | Released: August 23, 2022; Formats: CD, digital download; Label: Warner Music | |
| Numanice 3: Ao Vivo | Released: February 20, 2024; Formats: Digital download; Label: Independent | |

=== Mixtape ===
List of mixtapes
| Title | Details |
|---|---|
| MC Beyoncé | Released: December 12, 2012; Format: Digital download; Label: Berger Produções |

== Extended plays ==
List of EPs
| Title | Details |
|---|---|
| Fala Mal de Mim | Released: April 29, 2014; Format: Digital download, streaming; Label: Warner Music |
| Numanice | Released: April 24, 2020; Format: Digital download, streaming; Label: Warner Music |
| Vilã Live | Released: August 31, 2023; Format: Digital download, streaming; Label: Warner Music |

== Singles ==
=== As lead artist ===
List of singles as lead artist with chart positions, showing year released
| Title | Year | Peaks | | | | | Certifications | Album |
| Title | Year | BRA | ARG | POR | SPA | URU | Certifications | Album |
|---|---|---|---|---|---|---|---|---|
| "Sem Querer" | 2014 | 43 | — | — | — | — | | Hoje |
| "Hoje" | 2014 | 15 | — | — | — | — | | Hoje |
| "Te Ensinei Certin" | 2015 | 41 | — | — | — | — | | Hoje |
| "Não Quero Mais" | 2015 | 28 | — | — | — | — | | Hoje |
| "24 Horas por Dia" | 2015 | 46 | — | — | — | — | | Hoje |
| "Bom" | 2016 | 27 | — | — | — | — | | A Danada Sou Eu |
| "Sou Eu" | 2016 | 45 | — | — | — | — | | A Danada Sou Eu |
| "Cheguei" | 2017 | 46 | — | 41 | — | — | PMB: Diamond; AFP: Platinum | A Danada Sou Eu |
| "Tipo Crazy" (featuring Jeremih) | 2017 | 65 | — | — | — | — | | A Danada Sou Eu |
| "Solta a Batida" | 2018 | 55 | — | — | — | — | | Non-album singles |
| "Din Din Din" (featuring MC Pupio & MC Doguinha) | 2018 | — | — | — | — | — | AFP: Platinum | Non-album singles |
| "Jogando Sujo" | 2018 | 75 | — | — | — | — | | Non-album singles |
| "Clichê" (featuring Felipe Araújo) | 2018 | 32 | — | — | — | — | | Non-album singles |
| "Favela Chegou" (featuring Anitta) | 2019 | 95 | — | 64 | — | — | PMB: Diamond; AFP: Gold | Hello Mundo |
| "A Boba Fui Eu" (featuring Jão) | 2019 | 54 | — | — | — | — | PMB: Platinum | Hello Mundo |
| "Onda Diferente" (with Anitta, Snoop Dogg & Papatinho) | 2019 | 64 | — | 49 | — | — | AFP: Platinum | Kisses |
| "Flash" | 2019 | — | — | — | — | — | | Hello Mundo |
| "Melhor Pra Mim" | 2019 | — | — | — | — | — | | Non-album singles |
| "Verdinha" | 2019 | — | — | 128 | — | — | PMB: Diamond; AFP: Gold | Non-album singles |
| "Pulando na Pipoca" (with Ivete Sangalo) | 2020 | — | — | — | — | — | PMB: Gold | Non-album singles |
| "Amor Difícil" | 2020 | 85 | — | — | — | — | | Numanice |
| "Cobra Venenosa" (featuring DJ Will22) | 2020 | — | — | — | — | — | PMB: Platinum | Non-album singles |
| "Rainha da Favela" | 2020 | — | — | 123 | — | — | PMB: Diamond; AFP: Gold | Non-album singles |
| "Deixa de Onda" (with Dennis DJ and Xamã) | 2021 | — | — | 60 | — | — | PMB: 2× Platinum; AFP: Gold | Non-album singles |
| "Ela Não" | 2021 | — | — | — | — | — | PMB: Platinum | Numanice: Ao Vivo |
| "Vamos Com Tudo" (with David Carreira, Giulia Be & Preto Show) | 2021 | — | — | 9 | — | — | AFP: Gold | Non-album singles |
| "Gato Siamês" (with Xamã) | 2021 | — | — | — | — | — | PMB: 2× Platinum | Non-album singles |
| "Socadona" (with Mariah Angeliq & Topo La Maskara featuring Mr. Vegas) | 2021 | 18 | — | 31 | — | — | PMB: Diamond; AFP: Platinum | Vilã |
| "Maldivas" | 2022 | — | — | 133 | — | — | PMB: 2× Platinum | Numanice 2 |
| "Café da Manhã" (with Luísa Sonza) | 2022 | — | — | 37 | — | — | | Doce 22 |
| "Tic Tac" (with Sean Paul & Topo La Maskara) | 2022 | — | — | — | — | — | | Non-album singles |
| "Sou Má" (featuring Tasha & Tracie) | 2023 | — | — | — | — | — | | Vilã |
| "Nasci Pra Vencer" (featuring Dallass) | 2023 | — | — | — | — | — | | Vilã |
| "Brigas Demais" (featuring Delacruz and Gaab) | 2023 | 62 | — | — | — | — | | Vilã |
| "No Se Ve" (with Emilia) | 2023 | 77 | 5 | — | 13 | 12 | PMB: Gold; PROMUSICAE: 4× Platinum; RIAA: Gold (Latin) | .MP3 |
| "Sintomas de Prazer" | 2023 | — | — | — | — | — | | Vilã |
| "Ainda Gosto de Você / Já Era" (with Sorriso Maroto) | 2023 | — | — | — | — | — | | Non-album singles |
| "Macetando" (with Ivete Sangalo) | 2023 | 1 | — | 3 | — | — | PMB: Platinum | Reivete-se 3.0 |
| "Dia de Fluxo" (with Ana Castela) | 2023 | 5 | — | 49 | — | — | | Non-album singles |
| "Maliciosa" | 2024 | 15 | — | — | — | — | | Numanice 3 |
| "Falta de Mim" (with Mari Fernandez) | 2024 | 53 | — | — | — | — | | Numanice 3 |
| "Piña Colada" (with Ryan Castro) | 2024 | — | — | — | — | — | | Non-album singles |
"—" denotes a recording that did not chart or was not released in that territory.

=== As featured artist ===
List of singles
| Title | Year | Álbum |
|---|---|---|
| "Fiu Fiu" (MC Magrinho featuring Ludmilla) | 2013 | Oh Deejay |
| "Não Me Toca" (Zé Felipe feat Ludmilla) | 2016 | Non-album single |
| "Melhor Assim" (Biel feat Ludmilla) | 2016 | Juntos Vamos Além |
| "Sem Noção" (DJ Tubarão feat Ludmilla) | 2016 | Non-album singles |
| "Você Gosta Assim" (Gabily feat Ludmilla) | 2017 | Non-album singles |
| "Otra Vez (Remix)" (Zion & Lennox feat Ludmilla) | 2017 | Non-album singles |
| "Rainha (Remix)" (Virgul part. Ludmilla) | 2017 | Saber Aceitar |
| "Só Vem (Remix)" (Thiaguinho feat Ludmilla) | 2018 | Só Vem! (Ao Vivo) |
| "Meu Baile" (DJ Papato feat Ludmilla and Maejor) | 2018 | Workaholic |
| "Batom" (MC Kekel and Ludmilla) | 2018 | Non-album singles |
| "Não Vou Parar" (Funtastic feat Ludmilla) | 2018 | Non-album singles |
| "Pode Rodar Mais Um" (Matheus Marcollino feat Ludmilla) | 2018 | Eu Sou A Lua |
| "OMG" (Maejor, Ludmilla and Bia) | 2018 | Non-album single |
| "Qualidade de Vida" (Simone & Simaria feat Ludmilla) | 2018 | Aperte o Play! |
| "Onda Diferente" (Anitta and Ludmilla feat Snoop Dogg) | 2019 | Kisses |
| "Malokera" (Skrillex, MC Lan and TroyBoi featuring Ludmilla and Ty Dolla Sign) | 2019 | Non-album single |

=== Promotional singles ===
| Title | Year | Album |
|---|---|---|
| "Fala Mal de Mim" | 2012 | MC Beyoncé |
| "Morrer de Viver" | 2015 | Hoje |
| "Abstinência" (part. Filipe Ret) | 2016 | A Danada Sou Eu |
| "Tá Tudo Errado" | 2016 | A Danada Sou Eu |
| "Não Encosta" (part. DJ Will 22) | 2018 | —N/a |

== Other appearances ==
| Title | Year | Other artist(s) | Álbum |
|---|---|---|---|
| "Tá de Bobeira" | 2016 | Biel | Biel |
| "Vai Sentando" | 2023 | Skrillex, King Doudou and Duki | Fast X soundtrack |

== Music videos ==
| Title | Year | Director (s) | Notes |
|---|---|---|---|
| "Fala Mal de Mim" | 2012 | —N/a | |
| "Sem Querer" | 2014 | Thiago Calviño | |
| "Hoje" | 2014 | Rafael Kent | |
| "Final de Ano" | 2014 | Josué Luiz and Eduardo Mendes | With Anitta and MC Gui |
| "Te Ensinei Certin" | 2015 | João Woo and Rabu Gonzales | |
| "Não Quero Mais" | 2015 | Rafael Rocha and Lucas Carneiro Neves | |
| "24 Horas Por Dia" | 2015 | Felipe Sassi | |
| "Bom" | 2016 | Felipe Sassi | |
| "Sou Eu" | 2016 | Fabio Iadeluca | |
| Melhor Assim | 2016 | Felipe Sassi | |
| "Não Me Toca" | 2016 | Lucas Never and Rafael Rocha | |
| "Tipo Crazy" | 2017 | Santiago Salviche | |
| Cheguei | 2017 | Felipe sassi | |
| "Você Gosta Assim" | 2017 | Thiago Calviño | |
| "Din Din Din" | 2018 | Thiago Calviño | |
| "Jogundo Sujo" | 2018 | Felipe Sassi | |
| "Solta a Batida" | 2018 | Marcelo Sebá | |
| "Clichê" | 2018 | Roteiro e Montagem | |
| "Não Encosta" | 2018 | Kondzilla | |
| "Só Vem" | 2018 | N/A | |
| "Batom" | 2018 | Kondzilla | |
| "Flash" | 2019 | Giovanni Bianco | |
| "Verdinha" | 2019 | João Monteiro | |
| 'Melhor Pra Mim' | 2019 | João Monteiro | |
| "Do Jeito Que Tu Gosta" | 2019 | Thiago Calviño | |
| "Onda Diferente" | 2019 | Giovanni Bianco and Lula Carvalho | |
| "Malokera" | 2019 | Guilherme Valente | |
| "Pulando Na Pipoca" | 2020 | João Monteiro | |
| "Tuahina Raivinha" | 2020 | Tiago Silva | |
| "Sem Limites" | 2020 | Phill Mendonça | |
| "Cobra Venenosa" | 2020 | João Monteiro | |
