= WME Awards 2022 =

6th edition of the Woman's Music Event Awards

- Date: 21 December 2022
- Location: Audio; São Paulo, Brazil
- Hosted by: Preta Gil
- Website: premio.womensmusicevent.com.br/2022/

Television/radio coverage
- Network: UOL

The WME Awards 2022 were held at the Audio, in São Paulo, Brazil on 21 December 2022. In partnership with Music2!, the ceremony recognized women in Brazilian music. The ceremony was hosted by Preta Gil for the sixth consecutive time. The show was broadcast live on Splash's YouTube channel, as well as on UOL's Facebook and Twitter. Margareth Menezes and Elza Soares were honored.

== Winners and nominees ==
The nominees were announced on 11 October 2022, by Pepita and Letticia Munniz. Winners are listed first and highlighted in bold.

=== Popular vote ===
The winners of the following categories were chosen by fan votes.

Album	Singer
**Gracinha – Manu Gavassi**; De Primeira – Marina Sena; Numanice 2 – Ludmilla; Purakê – Gaby Amarantos; Raiz – Lauana Prado	**Luísa Sonza**; Duda Beat; Juçara Marçal; Liniker; Marina Sena
DJ	Alternative Song
**Heey Cat**; **Valenttina Luz**; Mary Olivetti; Miria Alves; Sophia	**"Diamante" – Pitty, Drik Barbosa and WEKS**; "Dar Uma Deitchada" – Duda Beat; "Atômico Platônico" – Liniker; "Diretoria" – Tasha & Tracie; "Foi Mal" – Urias
Latin Song	Mainstream Song
**"Envolver" – Anitta**; "Bailé Con Mi Ex" – Becky G; "Provenza" – Karol G; "Despechá" – Rosalía; "Te Felicito" - Shakira and Rauw Alejandro	**"Esqueça-Me Se For Capaz" – Marília Mendonça and Maiara & Maraisa**; "Pipoco" – Ana Castela, Melody and DJ Chris no Beat; "Fé" – Iza; "Maldivas" – Ludmilla; "Parada Louca" – Mari Fernandez
New Artist	Show
**Tasha & Tracie**; Ana Castela; Bebé Salvego; Melly; Rachel Reis	**Juliette**; Kaê Guajajara; Luedji Luna; Luísa Sonza; Majur
Music Video
**"Cachorrinhas" – Luísa Sonza**; "Fé" – Iza; "Era Uma Vez Liliane" – Negra Li; "Barbie" – Rebecca, Pocah, Lexa and Danny Bond; "Dia Bom" – Tássia Reis and Tulipa Ruiz

=== Technical vote ===
The winners of the following categories were chosen by the WME Awards ambassadors.

Songwriter	Music Video Director
**Brisa Flow**; Budah; Carol Biazin; Elana Dara; Lari Ferreira	**Juh Almeida**; Belle de Mello; Lu Villaça; Manu Gavassi; Maria Mang
Music Entrepreneur	Instrumentalist
**Bia Nogueira**; Aíla; Bete Dezembro; Carol de Amar; Ivanna Tolotti	**Badi Assad**; Alana Gabriela; Be.atrz; Juliana D'Ágostini; Michele Cordeiro
Music Journalist	Music Producer
**Didi Couto**; Adriana Barros; Julia Reis; Kamille Viola; Láisa Naiane	**Badsista**; Larinhx; Neila Khadí; Saskia; Vivian Kuczynski
Radio Presenter	Professional of the Year
**Nega Gizza**; Patrícia Palumbo; Marília Feix; Gabriele Alves; Paula Lima	**Daniela Ribas**; Cristina Falcão; Leila Oliveira; Ana Paula Paulino; Mônica Brandão
Girls for Reels!
**Bela Maria**
