= Okereke =

Okereke is a surname of Nigerian origin. Notable people with the surname include:

- Barbara Okereke (born c. 1990), Nigerian entrepreneur
- Bobby Okereke (born 1996), American gridiron football player
- Chioma Okereke, British-Nigerian author
- David Okereke (born 1997), Nigerian footballer
- Emeka Okereke (born 1980), Nigerian photographer and filmmaker
- Kele Okereke (born 1981), English musician
- Ndi Okereke-Onyiuke (born 1950), Nigerian financier and stockbroker
- Stephanie Okereke Linus (born 1982), Nigerian actress and director
- Tasha Okereke and Tracie Okereke (born 1995), Brazilian rapper duo
