= Oteh =

Oteh is a Nigerian surname. Notable people with the surname include:

- Aramide Oteh (born 1998), English football player
- Arunma Oteh, Nigerian politician
