= Comercio Partners =

Nigerian investment firm

- Type: Private company
- Industry: Financial services
- Founded: 2016; 10 years ago
- Headquarters: Lagos, Nigeria
- Area served: Nigeria
- Key people: Ibrahim Dikko (chairman)
- Products: Investments
- Subsidiaries: Comercio Partners Asset Management Limited (CPAM)
- Website: comerciopartners.com

Comercio Partners Limited is a Nigerian investment firm headquartered in Lagos, Nigeria. Established in 2016, the company operates as a Private Limited Liability entity in Nigeria. Comercio Partners Limited is a Dealing Member Specialist of FMDQ, a financial market infrastructure group in Nigeria.

== History ==
In 2016, Comercio Partners Limited was incorporated as a Private Limited Liability Company, initiating its operations in Lagos, Nigeria. Concurrently, the company attained the status of an FMDQ Dealing Member Specialist. In 2017, Comercio Partners launched its asset management division, Comercio Partners Asset Management Limited (CPAM). CPAM is a licensed Nigerian company, established and authorized by the Securities and Exchange Commission (SEC).

In 2018, Comercio Partners introduced the TradeFi application, allowing individuals to invest directly in Federal Government of Nigeria Bonds (FGN) and Treasury Bills using their mobile phones. Additionally, in the same year, Comercio Partners Limited launched its Annual Investors Conference. In 2019, Comercio Partners obtained an SEC Issuing House License and unveiled the establishment of a subsidiary, CP Property Development Company. In 2020, Comercio Partners acquired an Inter-Dealer Broker (IDB) License from the SEC.

== Tradefi ==
TRADEFI is a mobile application developed by Comercio Partners and launched in 2018. The platform enables individuals to invest in Federal Government of Nigeria Bonds (FGN) and Treasury Bills using their mobile phones. TRADEFI received endorsement from FMDQ, a financial market infrastructure group in Nigeria.

== Recognition ==
Comercio Partners received the Boutique Investment Bank Award at the 2020 Businessday Banks and Other Financial Institutions Awards. The firm was recognized as the Investment Bank of the Year for Growth Stage Companies and the Investment Bank of the Year for Sustainable Infrastructure and Project Finance in 2021 in Nigeria.

Comercio Partners was listed in the Financial Times rankings for Africa's Fastest Growing Companies in 2022, 2023 and 2024.
