= Social Enterprise Academy-Nigeria =

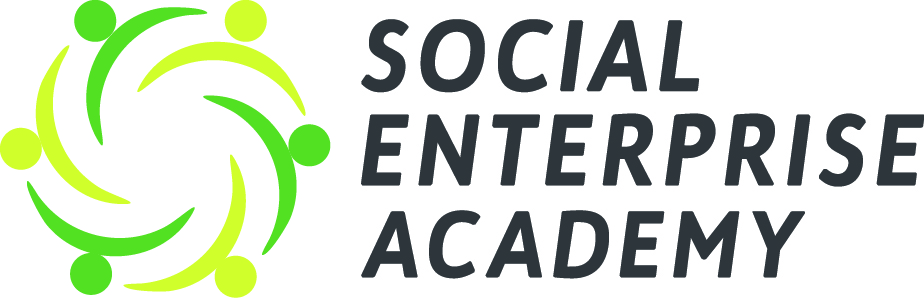
Social Enterprise Academy Nigeria, logo.

The Social Enterprise Academy Nigeria is an educational and capacity development institution, which awards internationally recognized certificates and qualifications in the field of social enterprise to professionals and entrepreneurs in Nigeria. The Social Enterprise Academy Nigeria is licensed by Social Enterprise Europe, and recognized by the Federal Ministry of Education in Nigeria.

== International affiliations ==
The Social Enterprise Academy Nigeria, sponsored by the Nigerian Capital Development Fund, offers programs in line with Social Enterprise Academies around the world. At present, the Social Enterprise Academy can be found in five other countries, including Scotland, Wales, South Africa, Australia and China.

== Social enterprise programmes ==
Programmes covered at the Social Enterprise Academy Nigeria feature a degree awarding Masters Programme in Social Enterprise and various certification programmes. These programme options, grouped into four categories offer courses in entrepreneurship leadership and innovation strategies, public policy and administration, cooperative enterprise and social innovation.

In line with the social impact objective and government partnership, the Social Enterprise Academy Nigeria offers hundreds of enrolled students full or partial scholarships to pursue any of its programmes.

=== Executive Masters in Social Enterprise Programme ===
The Executive Masters in Social Enterprise Programme is geared towards building and maintaining stakeholder support, securing investment, and measuring and communicating success for participants.

The programme consists of a 25 unit, seven-course curriculum, comprising four core courses and three electives. Core courses are usually completed over an 18 month period in an intensive format.

=== Executive Education Programmes ===
The Executive Education Programmes are designed to feature a wide variety of educational materials pertaining to organizational management. This category also provides customized programmes for public, social, and private sector executives. Programmes offered under this category include:

- Public Leadership and Social Innovation
- Strategies to Create Business and Social Value
- Public and Private Management of the Environment
- Financial Modelling for Social Enterprise & Non-profit
- Strategic Investment Management for Social Enterprise
- Emerging Business & Non-profit Leaders
- New Business Model in Emerging Market

=== Certificate Programmes ===
- Introduction to Social Enterprise & Entrepreneurship
- Managing Social Enterprise
- Cooperative Enterprise
- Public Entrepreneurship
- Micro Finance and Economic Development

=== Fellowship Programmes ===
- Introduction to Social Enterprise & Entrepreneurship (Nigeria)
- Global Social Enterprise (United Kingdom)

== See also ==
- Social Enterprise
- Social Entrepreneurship
- Nigerian Capital Development Fund (NCDF)
