= Nigerian Capital Development Fund =

Nigerian Capital Development Fund (NCDF) Logo, 2016

The Nigerian Capital Development Fund (NCDF) is an independent social investment financial intermediary institution. This hybrid organization was set up mainly to address the challenges of poverty in low income rural communities in Nigeria. The institution mobilizes capital from the public and private sectors to invest in projects, businesses and social enterprises with the intention to generate good financial returns and measurable positive social-environmental impact, as well as act as a champion to help increase awareness and confidence on the advantages of impact investing.

Furthermore, NCDF works towards actualizing the 17 United Nations Sustainable Development Goals which include poverty alleviation; improved education; access to clean water, sanitation, clean energy and good infrastructure; gender and economic equality in Nigeria. To ensure the implementation of these goals, NCDF operates projects in the housing, capacity development, agriculture, finance, environmental and hospitality sectors of the Nigerian economy.

NCDF is managed by a team of commercial and social enterprise professionals.

== History ==
NCDF, Old Logo

Following extensive studies on the need to support the Nigerian government in achieving sustainable developmental objectives, NCDF was endorsed in 2009 by the former President of Nigeria, Late Alhaji Umaru Shehu Musa Yar'Adua (deceased) and was incorporated in 2010 as a Limited by Guarantee entity under the law of the Federal Republic of Nigeria. Yar'Adua believed that the access to affordable basic social needs by low income earners and grassroot communities is the key opportunity to unlocking poverty in the Nigerian society. In 2011, Nigerian Capital Development Fund commissioned a corporation-NCDF Investment Limited, licensed by the Nigerian Securities and Exchange Commission as the Fund Manager for Nigerian Capital Development Fund.

== Partnerships ==
The partners and supporters of NCDF include the Federal Government of Nigeria, World Bank, The Central Bank of Nigeria, NERFUND, African Housing Group, National Directorate of Employment, First Bank, Commonwealth Telecommunication Organization (United Kingdom), Copernicus International Consulting (United Kingdom), Governments of Lagos State, Cross River State, Benue State, Imo State, Niger State, Jigawa State and the Federal Capital Territory of Abuja, Nigeria.

== Mode of Operation ==
NCDF is governed by the social mission to reinvest the majority of any surplus generated into socially impacting projects. As an impact investment agency, the fund operates a unique business model made up of three pillars:

• The NCDF Group, a holding company with the responsibility to mobilize resources, facilitate projects, promote and protect the Fund's institutional objective.

• NCDF Investment Limited, a special corporation chartered with the role of managing NCDF and partners. It is licensed as a Venture Capital and Fund Manager entity by Security and Exchange Commission of Nigeria.

• The Social Enterprise Academy, a research and capacity development institution setup to accelerate mainstream adoption of social sustainability into the heart of business strategy by developing leaders and enterprises through specialized training and leadership programmes.

== NCDF Projects ==
Past and current projects by NCDF include:

=== Affordable Housing ===
The NCDF affordable housing initiative was formed by NCDF entering into a partnership with the Nigerian government and some of its development partners to construct and deliver good quality, low-cost housing to communities with the greatest need. As part of its affordable housing provision scheme, NCDF also partners with the African Housing Group, a UK based company with a mission to provide homes to millions of Africans in the Diaspora. Some of the countries currently benefitting from the NCDF- AHG partnership are Nigeria, Ghana, Kenya, South Africa, Ethiopia, Angola, Tanzania and Uganda.

==== Kuje Housing Project (2012) ====
In September, 2012, NCDF and The Federal Government of Nigeria through the Federal Ministry of Housing signed a Public-Private Partnership Agreement to provide affordable Social Housing for Nigerians at the Federal Housing Estate, Kuje, Nigeria. Following project completion in 2016, the Kuje housing project resulted in the delivery of 50 units of 3 and 2 bedroom bungalows, reducing construction cost by 50%.

==== FCT-VIO Housing (2012) ====
In 2012, NCDF delivered 3 units of a 3-Storey multi-family building containing 24 units of 2 and 3-bedroom apartments in Abuja.

==== Imo State (2013) ====
In February, 2013, Imo State Government entered into partnership with NCDF to provide affordable social housing for its indigenes. The state allocated 30 hectares of land to NCDF to develop 3000 units of low income housing estate.

==== Benue State (2013) ====
In May, 2013, the Benue State Government of Nigeria entered into a Public Private Partnership Agreement with NCDF to develop affordable housing estates. 100 hectares of land was donated by the state for construction of 1,000 units of homes.

==== Lagos State (2016) ====
In 2016 NCDF formed a synergistic partnership with Lagos State Government to develop, construct and deliver 2,000 units of standard housing in Lagos State.

=== Education and Capacity Development ===
Using its Subsidiary, the Social Enterprise Academy, NCDF engages in training and retraining of social enterprise professionals and community leaders in specialized programmes needed to foster grass-root development. With the social innovation lab, NCDF provides free research oriented journals to members of the Academy's Social Enterprise Club.

=== MSME Finance ===
Due to MSMEs being one of the major drivers of growth in developing economies, NCDF devotes some of its resources to the provision of government subsidized loans, grant and specialized business equipment to micro, small and medium scaled enterprises in Nigeria. Under this scheme, a Special Purpose Vehicle called “Scoenterprise” was launched to provide Technical Assistance Facility (TAF) to sponsored businesses, partners and clients allowing for increased investment in the MSME sector.

The Minister of Women Affairs and Social Development in Nigeria, Hajiya Zainab Maina and the Director General, NCDF, Hareter Babatunde Oralusi.

In 2012, the Minister of Women's affairs and social development, Hajiya Zainab Maina signed a Memorandum of Understanding (MoU) with the Nigerian Capital Development Fund, for the take-off of a Seven (7) Billion Naira National Grassroot Economic Empowerment Scheme, as part of the effort to reduce poverty and unemployment in the country, especially for women living in rural communities.

=== Enterprise Project Development & Impact Investing ===
NCDF bridges community project consulting gaps through the fostering of technical, economic, financial, institutional, management, environmental, socio-cultural and gender-related models amongst community stakeholders to achieve bankability. The implementation aspect of NCDF's project development tagged “Impact Investing” is further conducted by seeking out direct investments from its partners, modelled to yield high social, environmental and financial rewards. Stakeholders under this initiative include the Federal and State Governments of Nigeria, The Private Sector, Donor Agencies, Non-profit Organizations, Financial institutions geared towards economic development, multinational corporations, cooperative societies and the Nigerian Public.

=== NCDF AgroPark Initiative ===
The NCDF AgroPark initiative is a project designed to provide lasting solutions to the problems of food shortage, poverty, low productivity, inadequate processing infrastructure, diversification and poorly integrated markets in Nigeria, aggravated by an under-developed agro-industrial sector. This project comes with a high potential for value added and employment opportunities in the agricultural sector. The AgroPark initiative works with development partners particularly World Bank and the Federal Government of Nigeria in line with the Commercial Agriculture Development Project.

=== Connecting Farmers Initiative ===
This NCDF project aims at improving the efficiency of agricultural businesses to aid the multiplier economic effects of increased food, national income and access to improved technology. The services offered under this initiative, aided by the Nigerian telecommunications sector, range from access up-to-date mobile information on agricultural practices, weather forecasts, market prices, as well as solutions that help agricultural businesses boost production. In a nutshell, the main objectives of this initiative is to:

• Help rural farmers develop new skills and grow revenue using technology.

• Provide specialized market information to farmers.

• Grant farmers access without limit to improved agricultural production methods.

• Assist many rural households in enhancing their food security and raising their incomes.

• Promote home-grown methods in agricultural innovation.

=== Clean Stove Initiative & Natural Gas Distribution Project ===
An ongoing project by NCDF in partnership with the Nigerian Ministry of Environment designed to systematically and practically proffer lasting solutions to the global issue of climate change in Nigeria through the provision and accessibility of clean stoves and natural gas at a subsidized rate for the low income families in the societies. However, the project is directed towards achieving great reduction in the environmental temperature, Green-House Gases (GHG) for improved livelihoods, health benefits and realization of the UNDP 2030 Sustainable Development Goals (SDG).

=== Oduduwa Heritage Tourism Development Project ===
A tourism initiative under the Nigerian Hospitality and Tourism sector, the Oduduwa Heritage Development Project is a cultural orientation scheme focused on disseminating information on the history, tradition and customs of the Yoruba people.

== See also ==
Hareter Babatunde Oralusi

Social Enterprise Academy-Nigeria
