= Rodriguinho (singer) =

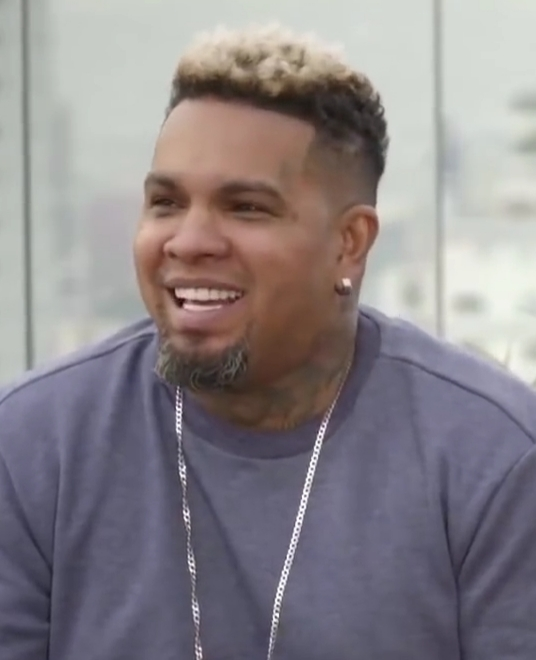
- Rodriguinho being interviewed on Vai, Ferandinha in 2019

Background information
- Born: Rodrigo Fernando Amaral Silva; 27 February 1978 (age 48); Bauru, São Paulo, Brazil
- Genres: Pagode
- Occupations: Singer, composer, music producer
- Instruments: Vocals; Guitar; Piano; Bass guitar; Banjo; Cavaquinho
- Years active: 1992–present

Rodrigo Fernando Amaral Silva (born 27 February 1978), better known by his artistic name Rodriguinho, is a Brazilian singer, composer, and producer. He was a singer for the group Os Travessos and later became a solo singer, releasing multiple albums and EPs. His son is singer Gaab.

== Biography ==
=== Work with Muleke Travesso and Os Travessos ===
In 1992, Muleke Travesso came into being and Rodriguinho was one of its members. In 1996, five of the members of the group, including Rodriguinho, left the band to form Os Travessos; the only one of the people to stay with Muleke Travesso was Eric, who called other people to join the group and continue it.

=== Resumption of solo career ===
In 2004, Rodriguinho left Os Travessos due to a misunderstanding with the manager and decided to establish a solo career. In 2005, he released his solo album, the self-titled Rodriguinho. In 2008, he released his DVD Uma História Assim. In 2009, he released his first live DVD, Uma História Assim 2. In 2010, he would release the album É Assim que Funciona. This would be followed up in 2011 by his second live DVD Uma História Assim 3.

=== Return ===
In 2014, after 10 years, Rodriguinho rejoined Os Travessos and released the album #OTVS 20 Anos in 2015 to celebrate 20 years of the groups existence. In 2016, he decided to leave the group again after 2 years.

=== Solo career ===
In 2016, he released two studio albums, Xinga Aí, Meu Deus Não Falha and Uma História Assim. 2017 would see the release of his fifth album, titled O Mundo Dá Voltas. That same year, he released another album, Pagode Flashback Ao Vivo and an EP, Samba. In 2018, he released the EP Legado: Música Pra Brisar, a partnership with his son, fellow singer Gaab.

In January 2019, he released, again in collaboration with his son Gaab and his brother Mr. Dan, the album Legado: O Show, singing their biggest successes. In April and May of that year, he launched multiple EPs, including 30 Anos, 30 Sucessos: Começo, 30 Anos, 30 Sucessos: Meio e 30 Anos, and 30 Sucessos: Não Tem Fim.

=== Big Brother Brasil 24 ===
On 5 January 2024, Rodriguinho was confirmed to be one of the participants of the 24th season of the reality show Big Brother Brasil, as a member of the "Camarote" group. After 50 days on the show, he was eliminated in the Paredão section on his birthday, on 27 February 2024.

== Personal life ==
Rodriguinho dated Sabryna Brisola, with whom they had a child, Gabriel, whose artistic name is Gaab. From 2003 to 2009, he was married to Thaís Gattolin, with whom he had two children: Rodrigo Júnior and Vitória. He was later married to Natália Damasceno, from 2010 to 2019, with whom they had two children: Aretha (foster daughter) and Jaden Fernando. He is a personal friend of singer Thiaguinho, with whom they have composed various songs together.

== Discography ==
=== Studio Albums ===
- Rodriguinho (2005)
- Uma História Assim (2008)
- Meu Deus Não Falha (2008)
- É Assim Que Funciona (2010)
- O Mundo Dá Voltas (2013)
- Xinga Aí (2016)
- Cheio de Maldade (2019)

=== Live Albums ===
- Uma História Assim - Ao Vivo (2009)
- Uma História Assim, Vol. 3 - Ao Vivo em Porto Alegre (2011)
- Pagode Flashback - Ao Vivo (2017)
- Legado: O Show (2019)

=== EPs ===
- Rodriguinho em Família (2005)
- Samba (2017)
- Legado: Música Pra Brisar (2018)
- Samba Vol 02 (2018)
- 30 Anos, 30 Sucessos: Começo (2019)
- 30 Anos, 30 Sucessos: Meio (2019)
- 30 Anos, 30 Sucessos: Não Tem Fim (2019)
- Blá Blá Blá (2020)

Rodriguinho has made brief appearances on the following albums:

- Roda de Samba do Exalta by Exaltasamba
- 25 Anos by Exaltasamba

== Compositions ==
Rodriguinho, together with Thiaguinho (an ex-member of Exaltasamba), composed the following songs:

- "A Amizade É Tudo"
- "Fugidinha"
- "Graça"
- "Leite Condensado"
- "Livre pra Voar"
- "Não Tem Hora e Nem Lugar"
- "Palavras de Amigo"
- "Puxando"
- "Resenha"
- "Valeu"
- "Virei a Mesa"
