= Numanice 2: Ao Vivo =

2022 live album by Ludmilla

Live album and video by Ludmilla
- Released: 23 August 2022
- Recorded: 21 July 2022
- Venue: Museum of Tomorrow, Rio de Janeiro
- Genre: Pagode
- Length: 55:20 (standard); 1:13:00 (deluxe)
- Language: Portuguese
- Label: Warner Music
- Producer: Rafael Castilhol

Ludmilla chronology
Numanice 2 (2022)	Numanice 2: Ao Vivo (2022)	Vilã (2023)

Singles from Numanice 2: Ao Vivo
- 1. "Insônia" Released: 22 August 2022

Numanice 2: Ao Vivo (stylized as Numanice #2: Ao Vivo) is the third live album by Brazilian singer Ludmilla. It was released on August 23, 2022, by the record label Warner Music. The recording took place at the Museum of Tomorrow, located in the city of Rio de Janeiro, on July 21. It features Péricles, Delacruz, Tá Na Mente, Gabby Moura, Marília Mendonça and Prateado.

On December 16, an extended version of the album is released, which adds 6 new songs that were recorded in Marquês de Sapucaí in November of the same year, and feature appearances by Alcione, Belo and Vou Pro Sereno.

== Promotion ==
=== Singles ===
"Insônia", a collaboration with Marília Mendonça, was scheduled for release on August 12, 2022, but out of respect for Mendonça's memory and all the work that the singer's team was doing around the EP Decretos Reais, Ludmilla postponed the release. The track was later confirmed as the first single from the Numanice 2: Ao Vivo.

== Track listing ==
Numanice 2: Ao Vivo track listing
No.	Title	Writer(s)	Length
1.	"Eu Estive Aqui"	Ludmilla; Junior; Tavares	2:40
2.	"Meu Homem é Seu Homem"	Ludmilla	2:38
3.	"Fora de Si"	Ludmilla	2:27
4.	"Sinais de Fogo" (with Péricles)	Ludmilla; Junior; Tavares	3:21
5.	"Maldivas"	Ludmilla	4:43
6.	"212"	Ludmilla; Junior; Tavares	2:28
7.	"Cabelo Cacheado"	Ludmilla	2:36
8.	"Quem é Você"	Ludmilla; Castilhol	2:52
9.	"Insônia" (with Marília Mendonça)	Ludmilla; Junior; Tavares	3:01
10.	"Por Causa de Você / Baby / 1 Minuto"	Andinho; Bridges Brian; Dalto Francisco; Flores Christine; Justin Bieber; Leonardo Teixeira; Nash Youngdel; Stewart Christopher; Vinicius Cardoso	4:33
11.	"Dorme Com Deus / Fica" (with Tá Na Mente)	Antonio; Cleitinho Persona; Douglas Lacerda; Elizeu Henrique; Indinho; Lele; Marcello Sartini; Rodrigo Oliveira	3:51
12.	"Me Arrepender" (with Gabby Moura)	Bruno Gabriel; Ludmilla	2:20
13.	"Nunca Mais Sofrer / Intriga de Oposição" (with Prateado)	Carica; Douglas Lacerda; Rafa Brito; Wilson Rodrigues	4:02
14.	"Maria Joana (Remix)" (with Delacruz)	Ludmilla; Delacruz	2:32
15.	"Cigana" (with Delacruz)	Clau; Delacruz; Gabrieu; Kevin; Luccas Carlos	3:42
16.	"Meu Desapego"	Ludmilla; Junior; Tavares	5:04
17.	"Mini Saia"	Carlos Moura; Gabriel Moura; Valmir Ribeiro	2:23
Total length:			55:20

Numanice 2 (Ao Vivo) - Deluxe track listing
No.	Title	Writer(s)	Length
1.	"Abertura Numanice"	Castilhol	1:18
2.	"Amor Difícil"	Ludmilla	3:30
3.	"Faz Uma Loucura Por Mim / Você Me Vira a Cabeça" (with Alcione)	Francisco Roque; Paulo Sergio Valle; Sérgio Caetano; Zenith Barbosa	5:01
4.	"Perfume" (with Belo)	Júlio Borges; Tavares	2:01
5.	"Não Vá Me Enganar" (with Belo)	Jemes Mtume; Prateado; Reggie Lucas	3:07
6.	"Teu Segredo" (with Vou Pro Sereno)	Billy SP; Felipe Saab; Thiaguinho	3:28
Total length:			1:13:00

== Release history ==
Release dates and formats for Numanice 2: Ao Vivo
Region	Date	Format	Version	Label	Ref.
Various	23 August 2022	digital download; streaming	Standard	Warner Music Brazil	
Various	16 December 2022	digital download; streaming	Deluxe	Warner Music Brazil	
