= MC Hariel =

Brazilian singer and songwriter (born 1997)

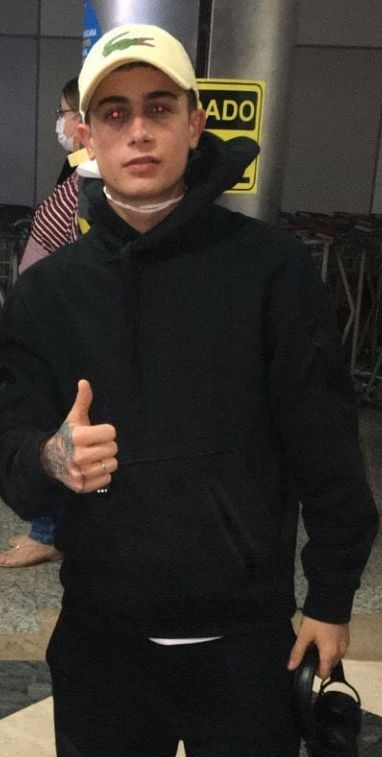
- MC Hariel in November 2021

Background information
- Born: Hariel Denaro Ribeiro; 20 December 1997 (age 28); São Paulo, Brazil
- Genres: Funk; hip-hop; trap
- Occupations: Singer; songwriter
- Instrument: Vocals
- Years active: 2010–present
- Label: GR6 Explode

Hariel Denaro Ribeiro (born 20 December 1997), known professionally as MC Hariel, is a Brazilian singer and songwriter of funk paulista.

== Early life ==
Hariel was born in Vila Aurora, a region in the northern part of São Paulo, in 1997. Influenced by his father, Celso Ribeiro, a musician who was part of the group Raíces de América, Hariel began his singing career by recording songs at the age of eleven. During his adolescence, he worked as a pizza delivery man and a card seller.

== Career ==
Hariel's first successful song was "Passei Sorrindo," released in 2014, which received a web clip by producer KondZilla the following year. At that time, he sang songs in the funk ousadia subgenre, with lyrics featuring double meanings and sexual connotations. In the following years, he also composed successful songs in the funk ostentação genre, such as "Novo Corolla," which was mentioned on the TV Globo program Auto Esporte.

However, Hariel's first national recognition came with the song "Lei do Retorno," a collaboration with MC Don Juan and recorded by GR6 Produções, which has garnered over 270 million views on YouTube. That same year, he appeared on Gaab's CD Melhor Viagem, on the track "Tem Café," a song with a more romantic tone, blending rap and pagode.

In early 2019, Hariel recorded his first DVD in the Bolivian desert, entitled Haridade. His first album was released the following year, in March 2020, titled Chora Agora, Ri Depois, a reference to Racionais MC's album Nada Como um Dia Após o Outro Dia. All songs on the album received a music video, with "Cupido" being the first and most acclaimed. His third album was the extended play (EP) "Avisa que é o Funk," released in October 2020, to widespread media acclaim. His most notable track was "Maçã Verde," which was among the most played songs on Spotify in both Brazil and Portugal. During this period, Hariel also participated in the single "Gabigol do Morro," in partnership with DJ Zullu.

In November 2020, Hariel released the song "Ilusão (Cracolândia)" with DJ Alok and MCs Davi, Salvador da Rima, and Ryan SP. The song referenced the region of São Paulo known as Cracolândia, with messages of awareness against the use of crack and other drugs; Hariel's father was a drug addict and died as a result. The song became the most played on Spotify in Brazil for three consecutive days. In December, a posthumous partnership with rapper Sabotage was released, entitled "Monstro Invisível", with a political theme and produced by DJ Kalfani. He reached two billion views on his materials in February 2021 and is considered one of the main representatives of the genre in the country today.

== Discography ==
=== Studio albums ===
- Chora Agora, Ri Depois (2020)
- 1Beat 1Letra (2022)

=== EPs ===
- Avisa que é o Funk (2020)
- Haridade na Resenha (2021)
- Dois Lados da Mesma Moeda + MC Don Juan (2021)
- Alma Imortal (2023)

=== DVDs ===
- Haridade (2019)
- Mundão Girou (2021)
- Funk Superação (2024)
