= Os Travessos =

- Origin: São Paulo, SP, Brazil
- Genres: Pagode, Samba
- Years active: 1996–present
- Members: Filipe; Chorão; Rodrigo; Edimilson
- Past members: Rodriguinho; Fabinho
- Website: http://www.ostravessos.com.br/

Os Travessos is a group of pagode created in the city of São Paulo by the members Rodriguinho, Fabinho, Rodrigão, Chorão, and Edimilson Salvino in the year of 1996.

== History ==
The group has origins from the East Zone of São Paulo initially having the name of Toca do Coelho, in 1990. In 1995 the group named themselves Muleke Travesso, and two years later they changed to Os Travessos.

In 2004, vocalist Rodriguinho left the group to follow a solo career, followed by Fabinho in 2005. The current vocalist, Filipe Duarte, who joined in 2006, is a former member of the group Br'oz. The 1st single with Filipe in the band was called Te liguei, a romantic pagode.

In 2007, Fabinho Mello (Fábio Borges Mello), died of a heart attack. In 2014, after 10 years, Rodriguinho became part of Os Travessos again.

== Members ==
=== Actual formation ===
- Rodriguinho (1992 - 2004, 2014 - now)
- Filipe (2006–) – vocal
- Chorão – percussion
- Rodrigo – percussion
- Edimilson – bass

=== Former members ===
- Fabinho (1992–2005) – voice and keyboard

== Discography ==
=== Albums ===
- Frente a frente (2007)
- Warner 30 Anos: Os Travessos (2006)
- Pura Mágica (2005)
- Os Travessos – Ao Vivo (2004)
- Dito e Feito (2003)
- Os Travessos (2002)
- Perfil (2001)
- Adivinha (2000)
- Declarações (1999)
- Os Travessos (1999)
- Nossa Dança (1996)

== Videography ==
=== DVDs ===
- Os Travessos – Ao Vivo (2003)

== Prizes ==
- Golden and Platinum Disc with the album Nossa Dança
- Golden Disc with the album Os Travessos
- Prize Prêmio VMB 2000 MTV for Best Vídeo Clip of Pagode with the music Meu Querubim
