= Banana (Anitta song) =

Single by Anitta and Becky G

from the album Kisses
- Language: Spanish; English
- Released: 5 April 2019
- Length: 3:16
- Label: Warner Brasil
- Songwriter(s): Ender Thomas; Mario Cáceres; Sam; Sean; SupaDups; Tainy; Theron Thomas
- Producer(s): Sam; SupaDups; Sean; Tainy

Anitta singles chronology
"Onda Diferente" (2019)	"Banana" (2019)	"Get to Know Me" (2019)

Becky G singles chronology
"Green Light Go" (2019)	"Banana" (2019)	"La Respuesta" (2019)

Music video
- "Banana" on YouTube

"Banana" is a song by Brazilian singer Anitta and American singer Becky G. It was released through Warner Music Brasil on 5 April 2019, as the third single from Anitta's album Kisses (2019). It is Anitta and Gomez's second collaboration, following their feats on the remix of "Mala Mía" with Maluma released in 2018.

== Music video ==
The music video was released alongside the song on 5 April. It was directed by Lula Carvalho.

== Live performances ==
Anitta and Becky G performed "Banana" together for the first time at the 2019 Billboard Latin Music Awards on 25 April 2019.

== Accolades ==
Year	Awards	Category	Result	Ref.
2019	MTV Millennial Awards Brazil	Clip of the Year	Won	
2019	Prêmio Jovem Brasileiro	Me Gusta	Nominated	
2019	POP Mais Awards	Best Music Video	Nominated	
2019	Top 50 Music Awards	Best Summer Hit	Nominated	

== Charts ==
Chart performance for "Banana"
Chart (2019)	Peak position
Portugal (AFP)	63

== Certifications ==
Region	Certification	Certified units/sales
Portugal (AFP)	Gold	5,000^{‡}
^{‡} Sales+streaming figures based on certification alone.
