= Arunma Oteh =

Nigerian business woman

- Born: Abia State, Nigeria
- Citizenship: Nigeria
- Education: University of Nigeria, Nsukka (BSc. in Computer Science); Harvard Business School (Master of Business Administration)
- Occupation: Senior Business Executive
- Known for: Business, Management
- Title: Vice President & Treasurer; World Bank

Arunma Oteh OON is a Nigerian economist. She was the Treasurer and a Vice President of the World Bank (2015–2018). She became the Director General of the Securities and Exchange Commission (SEC) in Nigeria in January 2010. In this position she was responsible for regulation of Nigeria's capital markets, including the Nigerian Stock Exchange. In July 2015, after her tenure in the SEC, she was appointed the vice president and treasurer of the World Bank. She was appointed chair of the Royal African Society in July 2021, taking over from Zeinab Badawi.

== Early life and education ==
Arunma Oteh is of Nigerian/British nationality. She is from Item in Abia State. She studied at the University of Nigeria in Nsukka Nigeria, earning a first class honors degree in Computer Science. She went on to the Harvard Business School where she obtained a master's degree in Business Administration. She co-edited the book, African Voices African Visions.

== Career ==
Oteh worked for various institutions including the Harvard Institute for International Development and Centre Point Investments Limited of Nigeria in corporate finance, consulting, teaching and research. She joined the African Development Bank (AfDB) in 1992.

Oteh was a Senior Investment Officer/Senior Capital Markets Officer from 1993 to 1997, then Division Manager Investments and Trading Room from 1997 to 2001 when she was appointed the Bank's Group Treasurer responsible for fund raising and investments in major international capital markets. Oteh was appointed vice-president for Corporate Management at the AfDB in March 2006, responsible for Language Services, General Services and Procurement, Human Resources, and Information Management and Methods.

=== SEC Director General, 2009–2015 ===
Oteh was nominated as the Director-General of the Securities & Exchange Commission by President Umaru Yar'Adua in July 2009. Arunma Oteh became Director General of the SEC in January 2010, after being confirmed by the Senate.

In a June 2010 interview with the BBC Oteh listed "wash sales, market rigging, pumping and dumping shares" as some of the abuses in Nigeria's capital market. She said the SEC expected to charge about 200 individuals and entities in civil or criminal cases. She faced resistance from the powerful Nigerian rent-seeking elite, but expressed confidence due to the backing she had received from President Goodluck Jonathan. In August 2010, as a result of some of the identified market abuse issues, the Securities and Exchange Commission removed the leadership of the Nigerian stock exchange.

The House Committee of Capital Markets and Institutions launched a public inquiry in April 2012 into the near collapse of the Nigerian capital market in 2008. Oteh and the committee chairman had a heated exchange over the focus of the hearing, leading to the chairman's resignation from the committee after allegations that he had asked for a bribe to influence the House Committee inquiry, and that he had collected public funds to attend a workshop in the Dominican Republic but had neither attended the program nor returned the money.

The SEC released two statements explaining their position on the allegations made during the public hearing. The First press statement made on 19 March 2012 focused on the varied allegations made by the committee.

In June 2012, The second press statement stated that "[n]o financial overtures have ever been made to the Hon. Hembe by Ms. Oteh, DG SEC or any staff of SEC." A new eight-man Ad hoc committee was set up by the House of representatives to complete the hearing on the near collapse of the capital market. As a possible fallout of the events that had taken place at the public hearings, Arunma Oteh was asked to proceed on compulsory leave by the SEC board, pending an independent investigation into the management of Project 50, a program packaged by her to commemorate 50 years of capital market regulation in Nigeria. At a point, the Minister of Finance, Dr. Ngozi Okonjo-Iweala who is the Supervising Minister in charge of the commission urged Nigerians to exercise patience pending the outcome of the investigation by PricewaterhouseCoopers (PwC). And at last, Arunma was exonerated by the firm of any criminal breaches.

On July 18, 2012, Oteh was called back to resume work after an independent investigation by the board-appointed firm, PricewaterhouseCoopers, cleared her of any financial impropriety. Oteh's concluded her 5-year tenure as SEC DG in January 2015.

=== World Bank, 2015–2018 ===
In July 2015, Jim Yong Kim, the president of the World Bank appointed Arunma Oteh Vice President and Treasurer of the institution. In that capacity, she managed the organization's US$200 billion debt portfolio, as well as an asset portfolio of almost US$200bn for the World Bank Group and 65 external clients, including central banks, pension funds and sovereign wealth funds.

In late 2018, Oteh left the World Bank to join St Antony's College, Oxford University, as an academic scholar and an executive-in-residence at Saïd Business School. Oteh was recognised in the 2020 Powerlist, of the most influential people in the UK of African/African-Caribbean heritage.

=== FSD Africa, since 2022 ===
In October 2022, FSD Africa, a development agency focused primarily on financial markets in Africa, announced that it had appointed Arunma Oteh to its board of directors.

=== Also including ===
Ecobank, Non-Executive Member of the Board of Directors (since 2019)

== Other activities ==
Oteh is the godmother of Leo DaSilva.

== Recognition ==
In 2011 Oteh was made an Officer of the Order of the Niger (OON) in "recognition of her contribution to economic development and to transforming the Nigerian capital markets".

In 2011 she received the "Distinction In Public Service" award from the Commonwealth Business Council/African Business.

In 2014, Oteh won the CNBC Africa All Africa Business Leaders Awards (AABLA) Business Woman of the Year category for West Africa. In 2020, Forbes listed her among "Africa's 50 Most Powerful Women".

== Bibliography ==
- Olugbenga Adesida; Arunma Oteh (2004). African voices, African visions. Nordic Africa Institute. ISBN 91-7106-530-X.
