= Socadona =

- Original cover

Single by Ludmilla and Mariah Angeliq, Topo La Maskara featuring Mr. Vegas

from the album Vilã
- Language: Portuguese; English; Spanish
- Released: 18 November 2021
- Recorded: 2021
- Genre: Afrobeat
- Length: 3:06
- Label: Warner Music Brazil
- Songwriters: Carolina Colón Juarbe; Clifford Ray Smith; Helder Vilas Boas; Jefferson Junior; Matheus Santos; Ludmila Oliveira da Silva; Mariah Angelique Pérez; Umberto Tavares
- Producer: Topo La Maskara

Ludmilla singles chronology
"Medley Lud Session" (2021)	"Socadona" (2021)	"Joga Duro" (2021)

Mariah Angeliq singles chronology
"Diablita" (2021)	"Socadona" (2021)	"Anaconda" (2021)

Topo La Maskara singles chronology
"Atención (Guaracha)" (2021)	"Socadona" (2021)	"Boom Boom" (2021)

Mr. Vegas singles chronology
"Skin to Skin" (2021)	"Socadona" (2021)	"Whine and Stop" (2021)

Music video
- "Socadona" on YouTube

"Socadona" (Portuguese: [sokaˈdonɐ]; transl. "A Lot of Punch"), is a song by Brazilian singer-songwriter Ludmilla. It features American singer Mariah Angeliq, Jamaican dancehall singer Mr. Vegas and Dominican music producer Topo La Maskara. The song was released for digital download and streaming through Warner Music Brazil on 18 November 2021. A funk remix featuring DJ Will 22 was released on 29 December 2021.

== Release and promotion ==
The promotion of the single began with a surprise publication by Ludmilla on her social networks, announcing the release of the song and the music video a day after the release of the single. "Socadona" was released for digital download and streaming on 18 November 2021.

== Live performance ==
Ludmilla performed "Socadona" for the first time on 20 November 2021, at Altas Horas. On 19 March 2022, Ludmilla performed the song at Caldeirão com Mion. On November 8, Ludmilla performed the song on Música Boa Ao Vivo.

== Charts ==
=== Weekly charts ===
Chart performance for "Socadona"
Chart (2022)	Peak position
Portugal (AFP)	31

=== Year-end charts ===
2022 year-end chart performance for "Socadona"
Chart (2022)	Position
Brazil (Pro-Música Brasil)	133
Portugal Singles (AFP)	85

== Certifications ==
Certifications for "Socadona"
Region	Certification	Certified units/sales
Brazil (Pro-Música Brasil)	Diamond	300,000^{‡}
Portugal (AFP)	Platinum	10,000^{‡}
^{‡} Sales+streaming figures based on certification alone.

== Release history ==
Release dates and formats for "Socadona"
Region	Date	Format	Version	Label	Ref.
Various	18 November 2021	digital download; streaming	Original	Warner Music Brazil	
Various	29 December 2021	digital download; streaming	Funk remix	Warner Music Brazil	
