= Vilã =

Studio album by Ludmilla
- Released: 24 March 2023
- Genres: Pop; trap; funk carioca
- Length: 41:32
- Language: Portuguese
- Label: Warner Music Brazil

Ludmilla chronology
Numanice 2: Ao Vivo (2022)	Vilã (2023)	Vilã Live (2023)

Singles from Vilã
- 1. "Socadona" Released: November 18, 2021; 2. "Nasci pra Vencer" / "Sou Má" Released: February 6, 2023; 3. "Brigas Demais" Released: March 24, 2023

Vilã (Portuguese: [viˈlɐ̃]; Villainess) is the fifth studio album by Brazilian singer Ludmilla, released on March 24, 2023, by Warner Music Brazil.

== Promotion ==
On March 6, 2023, Ludmilla revealed the track list for Vilã in the form of emojis. On March 14, the track listing, without riddles, was made available. The next day, the cover is revealed.

In April, the singer revealed, in a press conference for Rio2C, in Cidade das Artes, that she had released live versions of the songs from her album.

== Track listing ==
Vilã track listing
No.	Title	Lyrics	Music	Producer(s)	Length
1.	"Nasci Pra Vencer" (with Dallass)	Ludmilla	Ludmilla	Dallass	2:28
2.	"Sou Má" (with Ajaxx, Tasha & Tracie)	Ludmilla Oliveira; Tasha Okereke; Tracie Okereke	Beyoncé; Brittany Coney; Denisia Andrews; Flávio Castro; Pharrell Williams; Shawn Carter	Ajaxx; Ludmilla	3:30
3.	"Senta e Levanta" (with Stefflon Don, Topo La Maskara)	Helder Villas Boas; Ludmilla; Stefflon Don	Topo La Maskara	Topo La Maskara	2:36
4.	"Brigas Demais" (with Delacruz, Gaab)	Delacruz; Gaab; Ludmilla	Ludmilla; Ajaxx; Alan; Fabinho Rodrigues	Ajaxx; Ariel Donato; Ludmilla	4:08
5.	"5 Contra 1" (with Dallass)	Ludmilla	Ludmilla	Dallass	2:37
6.	"Vem Por Cima" (featuring Piso 21)	Ludmilla; Piso 21	Castilhol; David Escobar; David Lorduy; Juan David Huertas Clavijo; Pablo Mejia Barmudez	Rafael Castilhol	3:12
7.	"Socadona" (with Mariah Angeliq, Topo La Maskara; featuring Mr. Vegas)	Ludmilla; Carolina Isabel Colón; Angeliq	Clifford Smith; Helder Vilas Boas; Jefferson Junior; Juan Jose Brito Castillo; Umberto Tavares	Topo La Maskara	3:06
8.	"Solteiras Shake" (with DJ Gabriel do Borel)	Ludmilla Oliveira	Marcel "Mars" Korkutata; Rasool Diaz; Shane Lindstrom; Tyson "Zone" Kong	Gabriel do Borel; Marcio Arantes; Mars; Rasool Diaz; Zone	2:07
9.	"Sintomas de Prazer"	Ludmilla; Pablo Bispo	Ludmilla; Ajaxx; Donato; Lukinhas	Ajaxx; Ariel Donato; Ludmilla	2:28
10.	"Eu Só Sinto Raiva" (with Ariel Donato)	Donato; Ludmilla	Donato; Ludmilla	Ajaxx; Ariel Donato; Ludmilla	2:22
11.	"Malvadona" (with Oruam, Vulgo FK)	Ludmilla; Oruam; Vulgo FK	Ludmilla	Ajaxx; Ariel Donato; Coop The Truth; Galdino; Ludmilla	3:09
12.	"Gostosa com Intensidade"	Ludmilla	Ludmilla	DJ Chris 011	2:18
13.	"Make Love"	Ludmilla	Ludmilla	Rafael Castilhol	2:41
14.	"Me Deixa Ir"	Ludmilla	Jefferson Junior; Ludmilla; Umberto Tavares	Ajaxx; Ludmilla	2:20
15.	"Todo Mundo Louco" (with Capo Plaza, Tropkillaz, Ape Drums)	Ludmilla	Ape Drums; Capo Plaza; Laudz; Zegon	Ajaxx; Ape Drums; Tropkillaz	2:24
Total length:					41:32

Note

- "Sou Má" contains a sample of "NICE" by The Carters (2018).

== Release history ==
Release history and formats for Vilã
Region	Date	Format(s)	Label	Ref.
Various	March 24, 2023	Digital download; streaming	Warner Music Brazil	
