= Kisses (album) =

Studio album by Anitta
- Released: April 5, 2019
- Recorded: October 2018 – January 2019
- Genre: Reggaeton; Latin trap
- Length: 29:46
- Language: Spanish; English; Portuguese
- Label: Warner Brasil
- Producer: Supa Dups; Mambo Kingz; DJ Luian; Ryan Ogren; Alesso; DVLP; Sky

Anitta chronology
Bang! (2015)	Kisses (2019)	Versions of Me (2022)

Singles from Kisses
- 1. "Poquito" Released: April 5, 2019; 2. "Onda Diferente" Released: April 5, 2019; 3. "Banana" Released: July 9, 2019; 4. "Get to Know Me" Released: July 9, 2019; 5. "Rosa" Released: July 9, 2019

Kisses is the fourth studio album by Brazilian singer Anitta, released on April 5, 2019 by Warner Music Brasil. Following the proposal of her EP Solo (2018), Kisses is a trilingual album, comprising Spanish, English and Portuguese. Furthermore, it is a visual project; that is, each song has its own music video. The album focuses on genres such as reggaeton and trap, also presenting subgenres in some songs such as pop music, Brazilian funk, R&B, electropop and MPB.

Upon release, Kisses received generally favorable reviews from music critics, who praised its production and some of its tracks. It received a Latin Grammy nomination for Best Urban Music Album.

== Background ==
In 2016, after completing promotion for her third studio album Bang, Anitta began planning an international career and started releasing a series of collaborations including singles with artists such as Maluma, Iggy Azalea and Major Lazer during 2016 and 2017 in order to start the process of establishing her career outside of Brazil. The collaboration with Iggy Azalea, "Switch", marked the first time Anitta released a song in which she sings in English. A single named "Paradinha", which is sung in Spanish, followed in 2017 and became one of Anitta's biggest hits in Brazil whilst also charting in other countries such as Mexico and Portugal. In July, 2017, Billboard announced Anitta signed with Shots Studios for management outside of Brazil and that she was working on an English-language album which would feature Marshmello, Alesso and Poo Bear.

Later in 2017, Anitta announced a project entitled Check Mate, in which consists of releasing a new song in rather English, Spanish or Portuguese along with its accompanying music video. She launched the project with the premiere of the Poo Bear-produced "Will I See You" which became her first single in English as a main artist. In October 2017, she adventured into EDM by releasing the single "Is That for Me", a collaboration with Swedish DJ Alesso. For the November Check Mate release, Anitta collaborated with Colombian singer J Balvin on the Latin pop single "Downtown" and later released "Vai Malandra", a collaboration with American rapper Maejor as the conclusion her Check Mate project.

After the release of a series of singles aimed at the international market, such as "Indecente" and "Medicina" in the first semester of 2018, Anitta, while being interview by Billboard on the red carpet of 2018 MTV Europe Music Awards, announced the release of an extended play containing songs in English, Spanish and Portuguese, later revealed to be titled Solo, to be released on November 9, 2018, which would include "Veneno", a Pharrell Williams-produced English track titled "Goals" and the Portuguese song "Não perco meu tempo".

In January 2019, a member of Anitta team let leak through Instagram information about the fourth studio album the singer was planning, titled Game Over, containing eight tracks. However, after the leak, nothing was confirmed or denied by the singer herself. In March, Anitta released a teaser accompanied by the word "Kisses" in which she said: "Did you think that all my kissing would be for that?", referring to the news that she would have kissed several celebrities during the Carnaval of 2019. Days later, she confirmed that the project was about her fourth studio album, which would contain ten tracks and a music video for each of them.

== Concept and title ==
"There are 10 songs with a music video for each. Each represents a different type of Anitta that exists within me. The reference to the name Kisses highlights that there exist thousands of different types of kisses, but even so, it remains a kiss. During the next few days I will reveal to you the name of each song and the characteristic of each Anitta she represents. Through the eyes of the master [Giovanni Bianco]"

— Anitta talking about the album on Instagram.

Kisses is a trilingual album that includes ten songs in English, Spanish and Portuguese, which Anitta considers to be her "most risky" release of her career. It was by April 2019, when the album was released that it had been in production for over a year, "each track was carefully crafted with a purpose".

Anitta commented that in addition to the ten tracks, "ten different Anittas" would be presented on the project, elaborating: "Soon you will know all of them in Kisses, the album is trilingual and it's very special and I'm working to make everything perfect, I hope all of you like it and have fun with me". She also told Entertainment Tonight that her idea was to show the world her ten personalities and how versatile as a person she can be. Mariah Carey, Rihanna, Beyoncé, Ariana Grande and Cardi B were all named by Anitta as her major inspirations while working on the album.

For the album title, Anitta wanted a word "that can be different [things] but be the same thing". She originally intended to name the album Anittas, but the idea was scrapped because she felt it was "too literal". The title Kisses was eventually suggested by the album's creative director Giovanni Bianco, which also referred to the news that Anitta would have kissed several celebrities during the Carnival of 2019.

== Recording and production ==
The album and its music videos were recorded, produced and shot at a total cost of roughly BRL 15 million, of which Anitta paid "a little more than BRL 10 million" and the rest was paid by her label Warner Music.

According to Anitta, the collaboration with Snoop Dogg on the track "Onda Diferente" happened after the rapper called her after watching Vai Anitta, her biographical docu-series produced released on Netflix, to compliment her for it. Her collaboration with Brazilian singer Caetano Veloso happened after the duo and Gilberto Gil performed together on the 2016 Summer Olympics opening ceremony. She claims that her late grandfather was a big fan of Veloso and the fact she recorded a song with the latter was an honor.

== Promotion ==
Anitta revealed the track list through her social media accounts in late March before posting the cover art on March 27. A teaser video for the album was also released. On April 5, 2019 "Poquito" with Swae Lee was announced as the first single from the album. The second English language single will be "Get to Know me" with Alesso. The third single is "Banana" with Becky G, and the fourth single is "Rosa" with Prince Royce.

== Tour ==
Anitta began her new world tour, titled "Kisses Tour", in Boom, Belgium on July 27, 2019. The tour passed through South America, North America and Europe.

== Critical reception ==
Professional ratings
Review scores
Source	Rating
The Guardian	3/5 stars
NME	4/5 stars
G1	3.5/5 stars

Kisses received generally favorable reviews from music critics. Rachel Aroesti of The Guardian gave the album three out of five stars commending Anitta's personality in some of the songs such as "Banana" and claimed that it is an album "that feels more like a crowdpleasing sign of the times than a particularly thrilling proposition in its own right". Nick Levine of NME gave the album four out of five stars and commended it overall, by claiming it "creates a sleek and cohesive blend of reggaeton bops and aromatic, trap-flecked cuts". Mike Nied of Idolator considered the album to be Anitta's "most impressive feat to date".

Several tracks of the album were praised by music critics. Michael Love of Paper Magazine named "Poquito" as the best track of the album and described it "trap-inspired, bubbly, and sweetly seductive" which captives Anitta's essence into it. "Rosa" with Prince Royce was named as the album's best track by Raisa Bruner of Time, who believed the song "captures Anitta at her finest" and tells "a sensuous story". Mike Nied of Idolator complimented the track "Banana" with American singer Becky G by calling it "vibrant and playful", and also praised Anitta and Becky G's chemistry and the latter's "sassy" contributions to the track. Nick Levine of NME named "Você Mentiu" with Caetano Veloso as the album's "most musically surprising track" and claims it is a "show of confidence". Levine also praised "Onda Diferente" with Ludmilla and Snoop Dogg and the latter's rap verse on the track.

In 2019, Kisses was nominated for Best Urban Music Album at the 20th Annual Latin Grammy Awards.

== Track listing ==
Kisses track listing
No.	Title	Lyrics	Music	Producer(s)	Length
1.	"Atención"	Iberê Fortes; Jhay Cortez; Vicente Barco	Anitta; Mateo Tezzel	Tezzel	2:40
2.	"Banana" (with Becky G)	Ender Thomas; Mario Cáceres; Theron Thomas	Sam; Sean; Supa Dups; Tainy	Sam; Supa Dups; Sean; Tainy	3:15
3.	"Onda Diferente" (with Ludmilla and Snoop Dogg featuring Papatinho)	Ludmilla; Dogg	Ludmilla; Dogg	DJ Will22; Mãozinha; Papatinho; Umberto Tavares	2:40
4.	"Sin Miedo" (with DJ Luian and Mambo Kingz)	Elvin Peña; Francis Diaz; Henry Pulman	Kevin Maisonet; Anitta; Edgar Vargas; Luian Nieves; Xavier Vargas	DJ Luian; Jowny; Mambo Kingz	3:11
5.	"Poquito" (with Swae Lee)	Alyssa Cantu; Michael Matosic; Lee	Ryan Ogren	Ryan OG	2:55
6.	"Tu y Yo" (with Chris Marshall)	Adrian Marshall; Barbara Mendoza; Manuel Cortes	Anitta; Jorge Vasquez; Simon Restrepo	Dímelo Flow	3:26
7.	"Get to Know Me" (with Alesso)	Ale Alberti; Sweet Talker	Anitta; DVLP; Alesso	Alesso; DVLP	2:42
8.	"Rosa" (with Prince Royce)	Feid; Geoffrey Rojas; Jean Rodriguez	Anitta; Andres Saavedra; Dan Valbusa; Marcelo Ferraz; Pedro Dash	Valbusa; Ferraz; Dash	2:46
9.	"Juego"	Cortez; Anitta	DVLP; Sky	DVLP; Sky	3:12
10.	"Você Mentiu" (with Caetano Veloso)	Anitta	Jefferson Junior; Machado; Tavares	Mãozinha; Tavares	2:59
Total length:					29:46

== Charts ==
=== Weekly charts ===
Weekly chart performance for Kisses
Chart (2019)	Peak position
Spanish Streaming Albums (PROMUSICAE)	46
US Top Latin Albums (Billboard)	16
US Latin Pop Albums (Billboard)	4

=== Year-end charts ===
Year-end chart performance for Kisses
Chart (2019)	Position
Portuguese Digital Albums (AFP)	86
US Top Latin Albums (Billboard)	93

== Release history ==
List of formats and release dates for Kisses
Region	Date	Format(s)	Label
Various	April 5, 2019	Digital download; streaming	Warner Music Group
