= Social Enterprise Europe =

Social Enterprise Europe is a company co-ordinated and managed by Cliff Southcombe, organised as a co-operative network of educators, consultants and social enterprise advocates in four continents. Company members, associates and Social Licence holders have been at the forefront of social enterprise development in their respective countries for more than 20 years.

The company has directors based in the UK, Sweden, Germany, France, Italy and Indonesia, and a secondary network of associate consultants and independent Social Licence holders who deliver programmes in Poland, Serbia, Croatia, Turkey, East Africa, Vietnam, Philippines and China.

Social Enterprise Europe hosts the FairShares Association, and supports a FairShares Model of social enterprise development which gives stakeholders a fairer share of the wealth their interactions create.
