= Securities and Exchange Commission (Nigeria) =

Government regulatory body overseeing the stock market

Securities and Exchange Commission, Nigeria
Agency overview
- Formed: 1979
- Preceding agency: Capital Issues Commission
- Jurisdiction: Nigeria
- Headquarters: Abuja
- Agency executives: Mairiga Aliyu Katuka, Chairman; [Dr. Emomotimi Agama], Director General
- Website: https://www.sec.gov.ng

The Securities and Exchange Commission (SEC) is the main regulatory institution of the Nigerian capital market. It is supervised by the Federal Ministry of Finance. The Nigerian Stock Exchange (NSE) is privately owned and self-regulating, but the SEC maintains surveillance over it with the mandate of ensuring orderly and equitable dealings in securities, and protecting the market against insider trading abuses.

== Formation and early years ==
The Commission originates from the ad hoc, non-statutory Capital Issues Committee established in 1962 as an arm of the Central Bank of Nigeria. The committee became the Security Exchange Commission in 1977, and then the Securities and Exchange Commission was chartered with SEC Decree No. 71 of 1979. The commission is now chartered by the Investments and Securities Act No 45 of 1999.

A second-tier securities market was established in 1985, and the market grew as the government followed a program of privatization of public sector enterprises. With market capitalization of N4.46 billion in 1980, by the end of 1997 the Nigerian securities market had a market capitalization of N281.8 billion. The market appeared to be operating efficiently, although it was depressed by low personal incomes in Nigeria and political instability deterring foreign direct investment.

== 2000-2010 capital market boom and bust ==
During the first half of the 2000s, the Central Bank of Nigeria instituted reforms that led to a reduction in the number of banks but a great increase in their size. This and other factors led to a surge in equity market capitalization on the NSE, peaking in March 2008 at US$100 billion, over 60% of which was owned by the banks. When Musa Al-Faki, a stockbroker, was installed Director General in 2004, many thought his appointment had been engineered by Ndi Okereke-Onyiuke, head of the Nigerian Stock Exchange. If so, this may have undermined the authority of the SEC as a supervisor during a period of rampant speculation.

The 2008 financial crisis caused a severe crisis among Nigerian banks, with several forced to close. After the Central Bank had audited the banks in 2009, the SEC started legal proceedings at the Investments and Securities Tribunal against about 260 individuals and entities, alleging that they were involved in abuse such as insider dealing and share price manipulation. The commission also instituted various reforms including improving regulations so as to encourage development of the bond market, promoting collective investment schemes and reviewing the 2003 Corporate Governance Code.

SEC Director General Al-Faki resigned in April 2009 amid criticism of the SEC role in a share-manipulation scandal involving the African Petroleum stock. He was eventually replaced by Arunma Oteh, who became Director General in January 2010. In August 2010 Oteh dismissed Okereke-Onyiuke from the stock exchange. The President of the Stock Exchange, Alhaji Aliko Dangote, was also dismissed. In September 2010 it was reported that the SEC was considering converting the stock exchange to a private company rather than a mutually owned enterprise. The SEC said its actions were due to problems at the stock exchange that included "inadequate oversight...ongoing litigation, allegations of financial mismanagement, governance challenges".

== Leaders ==
- Joseph Oladele Sanusi, Chief executive (1978–1979)
- John Madaki, Chairman (2001 –)
- John Edozien, Chairman (2005 –)
- Musa Al-Faki, Director General (2004 – May 2009)
- Udoma Udo Udoma, Chairman (2009 –2010)
- Arunma Oteh, Director General (January 2010 – 2015)
- Peter Obi, Chairman (April 2015 – June 2015)
- Mounir H. Gwarzo, Director General (May 2015 – 2017)
- Abdul Zubair, Acting Director General (2017 – 2018)
- Mary Uduk, Acting Director General (2017 – 2020)
- Olufemi Lijadu, Chairman (2019 - till date)
- Lamido Yuguda, Director General (2020 – 2024)
- Mairiga Katuka, Chairman (2024 - till date )
- Emomotimi Agama, Director General (2024 - till date)

== See also ==
- List of financial supervisory authorities by country
