= Barbara Okereke =

Nigerian cake designer and entrepreneur

Barbara Okereke‑Ndugbu
- Born: 1988 (age 37–38); Nigeria
- Education: Anambra State University (B.Eng. Electrical Engineering); Coventry University (MBA in Oil and Gas Management); Fair Cake Culinary School, Greenwich, London (Cake Design)
- Occupations: Cake Designer, Entrepreneur
- Employer: Oven Secret Bakery
- Known for: Founder and Managing Director of Oven Secret Bakery
- Notable work: Forbes Africa 30 Under 30 (2019)

Barbara Okereke-Ndugbu (born c.1988) is a Nigerian cake designer and entrepreneur, founder and managing director of Oven Secret Bakery. In 2019 she was listed on the Forbes'30 under-30'. She is said to be one of the fast rising entrepreneurs to watch out for in Africa.

== Life ==
Barbara Okereke has a degree in electrical engineering from Anambra State University, and an MBA in Oil and Gas Management from Coventry University. She learnt cake design at Fair Cake culinary school in Greenwich, London. In 2015 Okereke started her own cake baking business in Port Harcourt, but move to the city of Lagos in 2016. She has created over a thousand cake designs, and trained over has five hundred students physically and online.

Forbes included Okereke, then aged 28, on their 2019 list of thirty under-30 people to watch in Africa. In 2020 The Guardian included her on their list of 100 most inspiring women in Nigeria.
