= Hoje (Ludmilla album) =

Studio album by Ludmilla
- Released: August 26, 2014
- Recorded: 2014
- Genre: Pop; R&B; dance; funk melody
- Label: Warner Music Brazil

Ludmilla chronology
Fala Mal de Mim (2014)	Hoje (2014)

Singles from Hoje
- 1. "Sem Querer" Released: January 14, 2014; 2. "Hoje" Released: June 20, 2014; 3. "Te Ensinei Certin" Released: January 22, 2015; 4. "Não Quero Mais" Released: July 1, 2015; 5. "24 Horas por Dia" Released: December 18, 2015

Hoje is the debut major-label studio album by Brazilian singer Ludmilla, released on August 26, 2014 through Warner Music Brazil. The album features 12 songs with 7 written by the singer and the iTunes Store version features two more tracks. Ludmila herself said that the album is her and have all of her.

== Tracks listing ==
No.	Title	Writer(s)	Length
1.	"Sem Querer"	Ludmilla	2:49
2.	"Hoje"	Jefferson Junior, Umberto Tavares	2:57
3.	"Garota Recalcada"	Ludmilla	2:26
4.	"Te Ensinei Certin"	Jhama	2:12
5.	"Não Quero Mais" (Part. Belo)	Jefferson Junior, Umberto Tavares	3:33
6.	"Se Eu Descobrir"	Rafinha Compositor	2:41
7.	"Tudo Vale a Pena" (Part. Buchecha)	André Vieira, Wallace Vianna	3:44
8.	"Amor Não É Oi"	Ludmilla	2:19
9.	"Fala Mal de Mim"	Ludmilla, MC Roba Cena	3:30
10.	"Morrer de Viver"	Arthur Gaboardi	2:22
11.	"24 Horas por Dia"	Ludmilla	3:12
12.	"Sem Querer" (Funk Mix)	Ludmilla	2:45

=== iTunes bonus ===
No.	Title	Writer(s)	Length
13.	"Poder da Preta"	Ludmilla	3:13
14.	"Seu Tempo Acabou"	Ludmilla	2:25

== Usage in media ==
- "Hoje" was used in the soundtrack of Rede Globo's telenovela Império.
- "Te Ensinei Certin" is used in the soundtrack of I Love Paraisópolis, also from Rede Globo.
