= Ndi Okereke-Onyiuke =

Nigerian stockbroker and former Director General of the Nigerian Stock Exchange

Ndi Okereke‑Onyiuke
- Born: November 2, 1950 (age 75); Nigeria
- Citizenship: Nigerian
- Education: Queen's School, Enugu (Secondary education); Baruch College, City University of New York (MBA in Finance and Computer Science)
- Occupations: Stockbroker, Businesswoman
- Known for: First female stockbroker in Nigeria; Former Director General of the Nigerian Stock Exchange
- Awards: Professional Excellence Foundation of Nigeria (PEFON) Award for Excellence

Ndi Okereke-Onyiuke (born 2 November 1950) is a former director general of the Nigerian Stock Exchange and the first female stockbroker in Nigeria.

== Early life ==
She had her secondary education at Queen's School, Enugu, Nigeria. She obtained her Master of Business Administration in Finance and Computer Science from Baruch College of the City University of New York, USA. Although Okereke-Onyiuke claimed that she earned a Doctor of Philosophy as well as Doctor of Administration in Finance and Securities Market from the Graduate Center of the City University of New York, there is no record according to the university that she attended the programme and was awarded the said degrees. Ndi Okereke-Onyiuke started work with the Nigerian Stock Exchange in January 1983 as the Manager and Head of Research and Information Services.

== Career ==
Ndi Okereke-Onyiuke rose to the apex position of Director General and Chief Executive Officer of the Nigerian Stock Exchange (NSE). She is one of the notable women in Nigeria who has occupied important and key administrative and political positions. She is the first woman that ever held the position of Director of NSE.

Ndi Okereke-Onyiuke, amongst others, was honored by Professional Excellence Foundation of Nigeria (PEFON) for excellence and leading right in their profession
