= Museum of Tomorrow =

Science museum in Rio de Janeiro, Brazil

- Museu do Amanhã
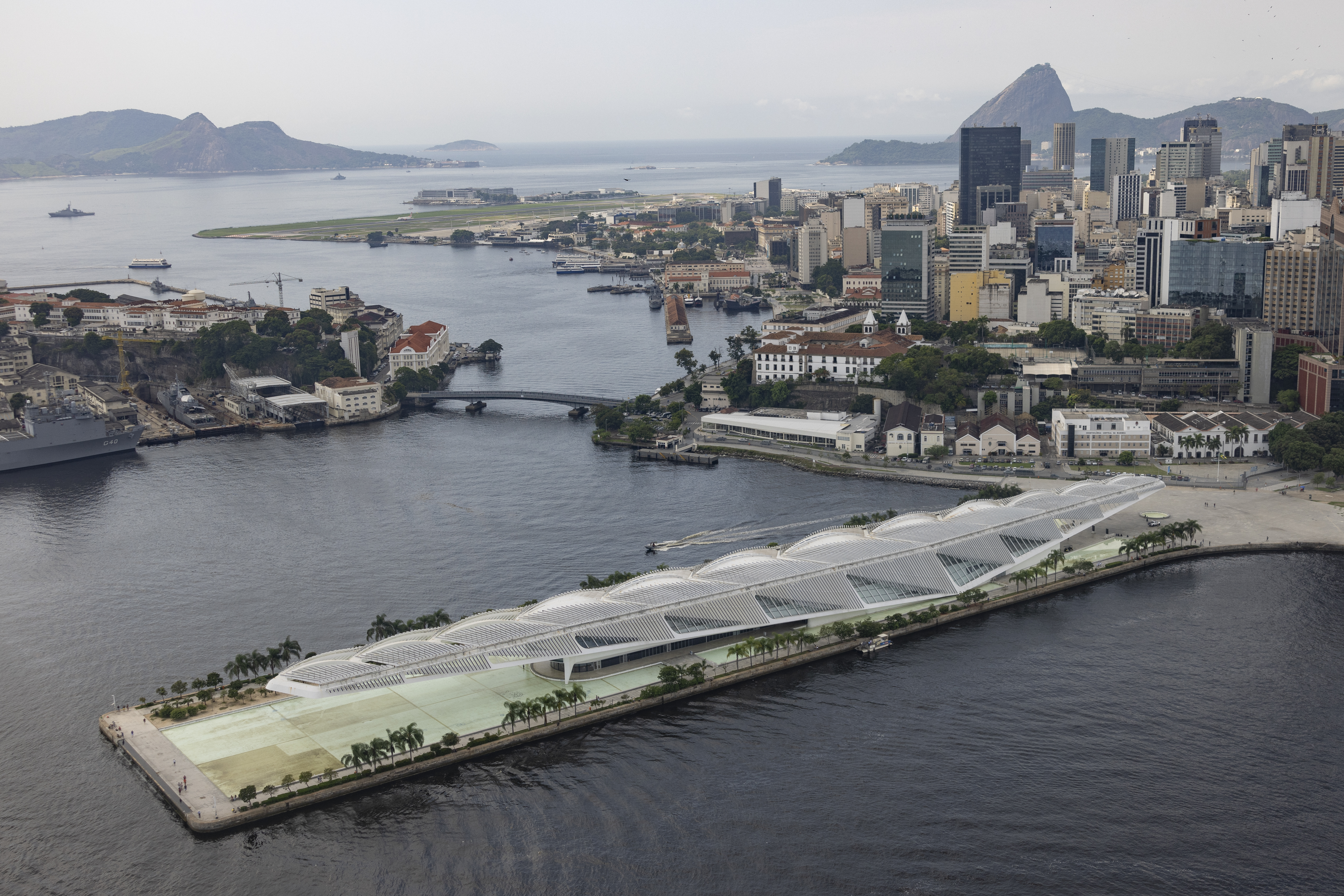
- Established: 17 December 2015
- Location: Píer Mauá, Rio de Janeiro, Brazil
- Architect: Santiago Calatrava
- Website: Official website

The Museum of Tomorrow (Portuguese: Museu do Amanhã) is a science museum in the city of Rio de Janeiro, Brazil. It was designed by Spanish neofuturistic architect Santiago Calatrava, and built next to the waterfront at Pier Maua. Its construction was supported by the Roberto Marinho Foundation and cost approximately 230 million reais. The building was opened on 17 December 2015, with President Dilma Rousseff in attendance.

One of the goals in building the museum was to strengthen the cultural and international identity of the city of Rio de Janeiro. The museum was presented as an icon of the reurbanization of the port area.

== Exhibitions ==
The main exhibition takes visitors through five main areas: Cosmos, Earth, Anthropocene, Tomorrow, and Us, via a number of experiments and experiences. The museum mixes science with an innovative design to focus on sustainable cities and an ecological world.

The museum was part of the city's port area renewal for the 2016 Summer Olympics.

== Gallery ==
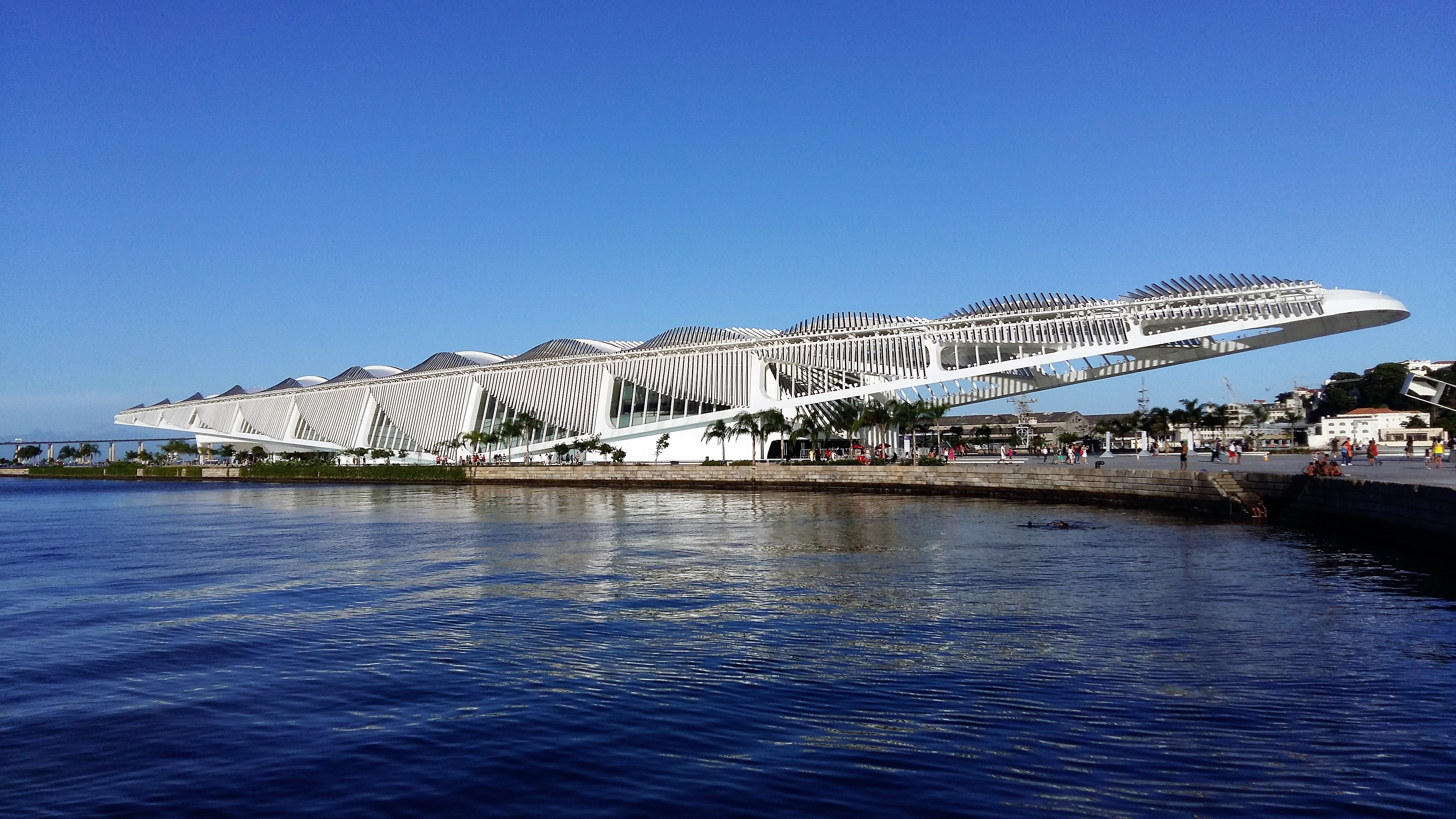

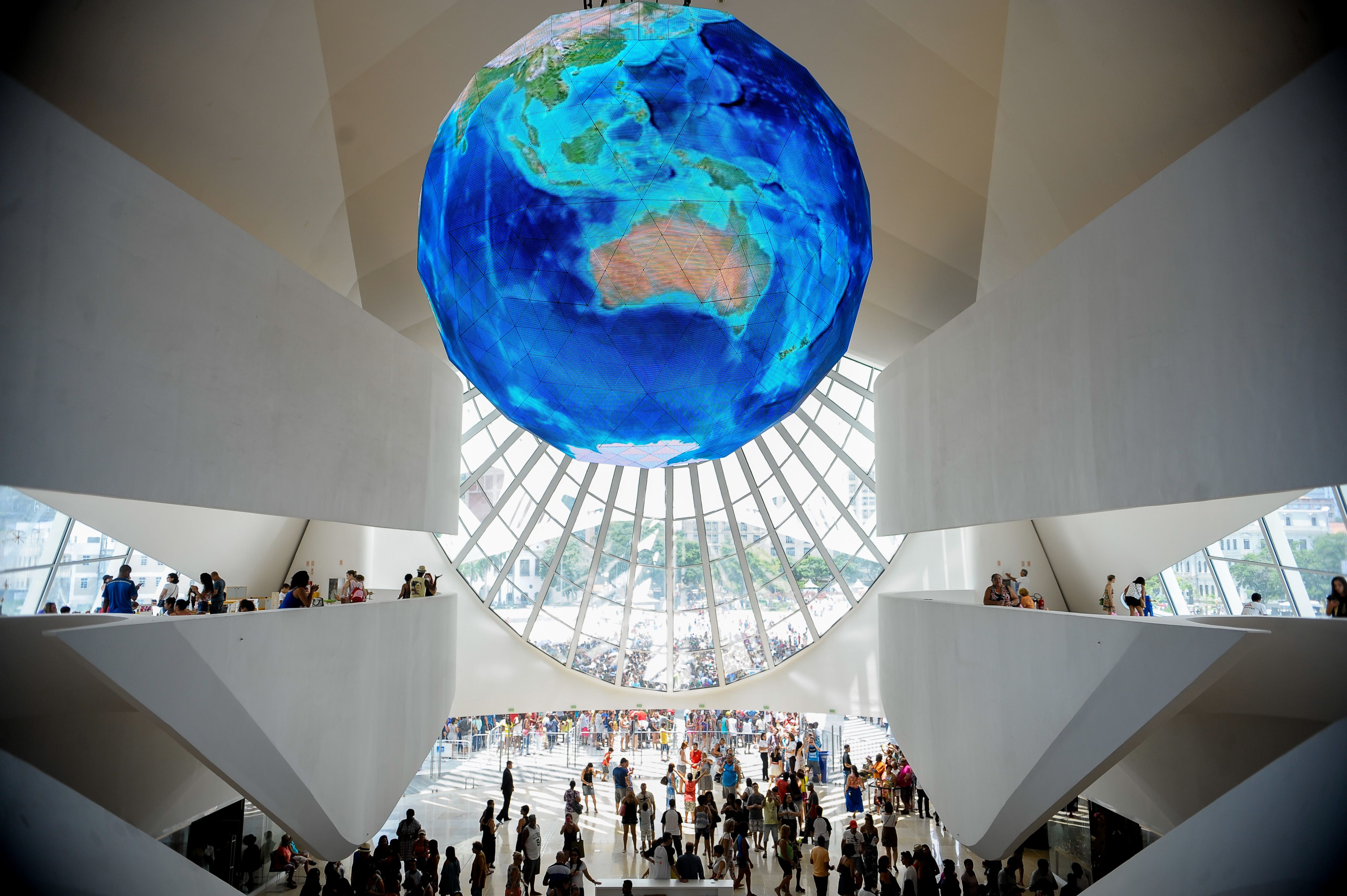

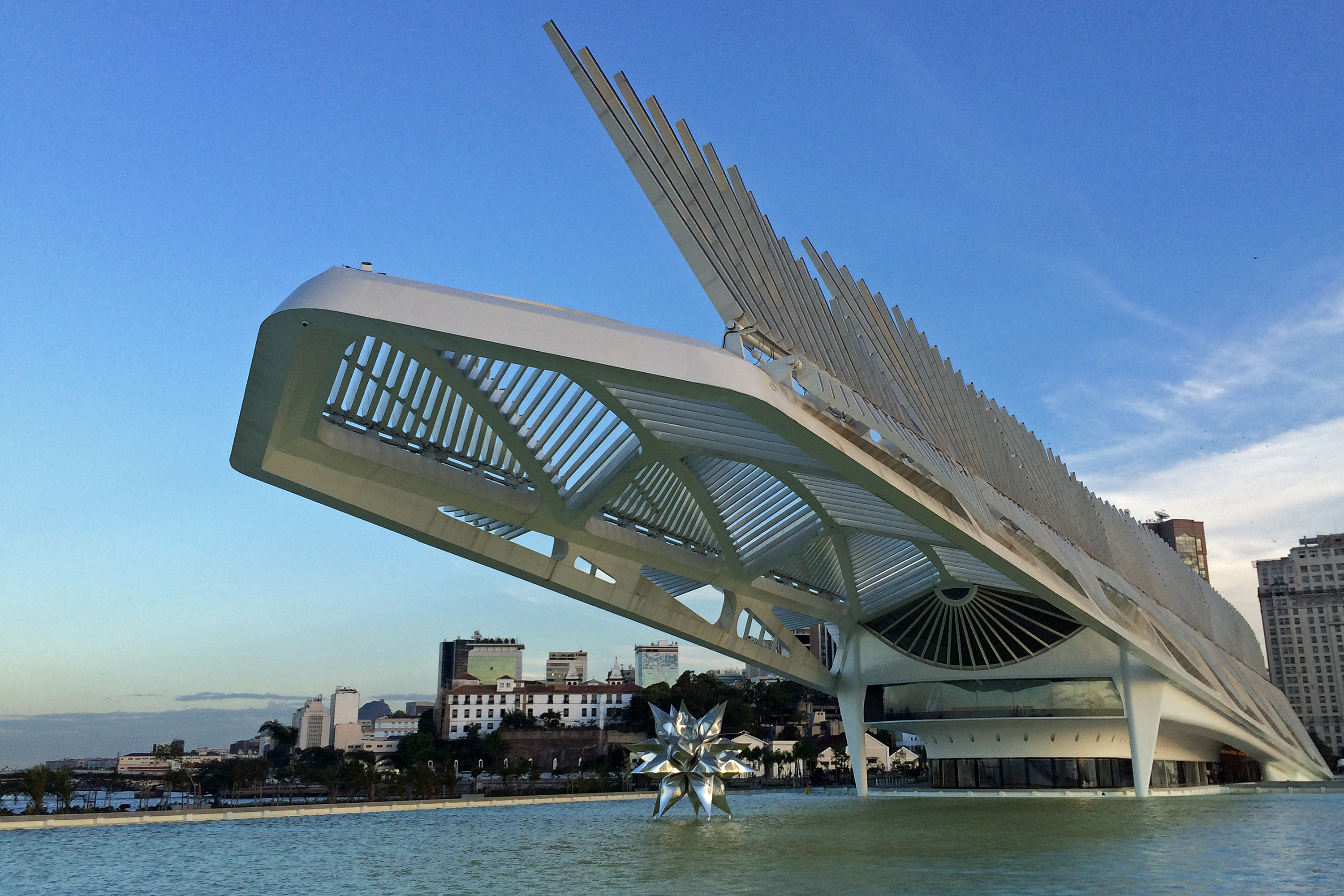

== See also ==
- AquaRio
