= Gaab (singer) =

Brazilian singer (born 1998)

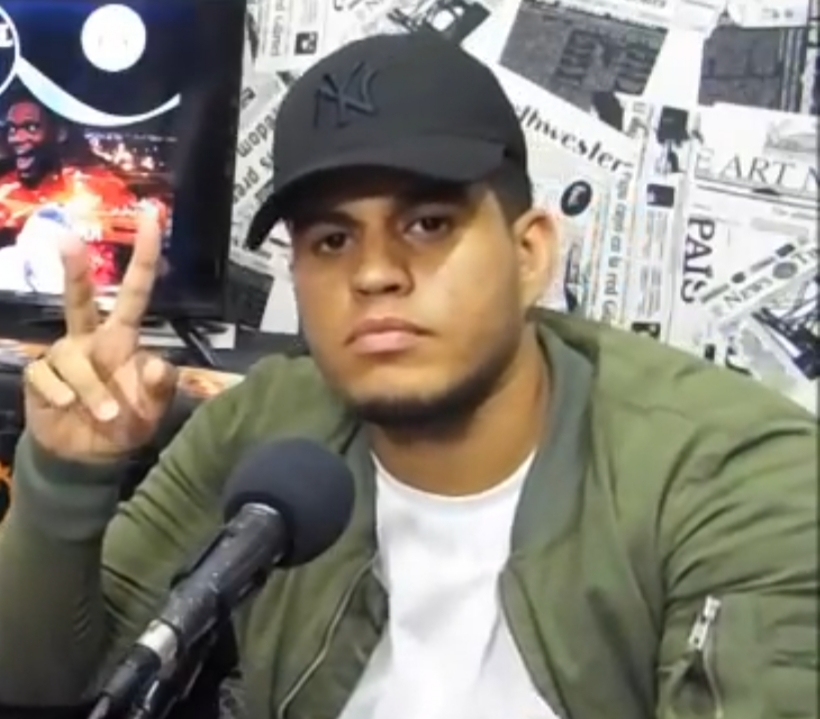

Background information
- Born: Gabriel Fernando Brisola Amaral Silva; 15 October 1998 (age 27); São Paulo, Brazil
- Genres: R&B
- Occupations: Singer, composer
- Instruments: Vocals; Guitar
- Years active: 2013–present

Gabriel Fernando Brisola Amaral Silva (born 15 October 1998) better known by his artistic name Gaab, is a Brazilian singer and composer. His father is singer Rodriguinho.

== Career ==
Coming from a family of musicians, such as his father Rodriguinho and uncle Ah! Mr. Dan, Gaab, as a teenager, began to accompany his father on tour as a backing vocalist for his team. He composed his first song when he was just 14 years old, and would send it to Thiaguinho, who liked it and decided to record it for his album Hey, Mundo. Despite his familiarity with pagode, Gaab sought references in R&B and pop, which led him to signing a contract with GR6 Explode.

In 2016, he and his friends Negretes and Fabinho, created a band called Dinastia, but the group broke up the same year. On 9 September 2016, he released his first album which was self-titled and had a single in "Só Você Não Vê". Guest appearances included his father Rodriguinho and the singers Thomaz Melo and Vilc. On 15 September 2017, he released his second album, Melhor Viagem, which has as singles "Cuidado", "Tô Brisando em Você", "Tem Café", "Positividade", "Vai Passar" and "Melhor Viagem", and has as guest appearances MC Hariel, Lest Gang, and Júnior Lord. This would be followed by the release of his first EP, Legado: Músicas Para Brisar, on 18 December, which he released together with his father. The EP has six tracks mixed in with hits between both of them.

On 27 July 2018, Gaab released his third studio album, titled U, which has as singles "U", "Preservê", "De Uns Dias", and "Sem Pressa". Guest appearances included Rodriguinho, Thomaz, Ana Gabriela, and MC Livinho. On 4 January 2019, he released his first DVD, titled Legado: O Show, in partnership with his father and Ah! Mr. Dan, singing their biggest hits as a way to celebrate their family's history and to remember the successes of the artists over the span of years, with the participation of close friends.

On 17 February 2019, he recorded his first solo DVD at Cruz Caída square in Salvador, titled Positividade. There were a wide variety of guest appearances that included MC Livinho, MC Davi, MC Hariel, Negra Li, 1Kilo, Thomaz, Igor Kannário, and Júnior Lord. The DVD was released on 17 May 2019. That same year, he signed a contract with Universal Music.

On 29 May 2019, Gaab participated in the single "intenção", with singer Marília Mendonça. The singers made a surprise appearance on Torre de TV in Brasília, as part of the "Todos os Cantos" tour. Around 50 million people watched the show, and in less than 24 hours, the video had more than 1.5 million views on YouTube.

== Personal life ==
Gaab is the son of pagode singer Rodriguinho and Sabryna Brisola. In 2017, he had his first daughter Heloísa, the first daughter of the actor, with his girlfriend, dancer and actress Michelle Alveia. He later had his second daughter, Heili.

== Discography ==
=== Studio albums ===
- Gaab (2016)
- Melhor Viagem (2017)
- U (2018)

=== Live albums ===
- Legado: O Show (2019)
- Positividade (2019)
