= Tasha & Tracie =

Brazilian hip hop duo (born 1995)

- Born: Tasha Egine Nascimento Okereke; Tracie Ona Nascimento Okereke; June 15, 1995 (age 30)
- Origin: São Paulo, SP, Brazil
- Genres: Hip hop; trap; rap; funk ostentação; grime; R&B; dancehall
- Years active: 2019–present
- Label: Ceia Ent. (2019–2022)

Tasha & Tracie is a Brazilian hip hop duo formed by twin sisters Tasha Okereke and Tracie Okereke, who work in art, fashion, activism and music.

Tasha & Tracie unite rap with funk carioca in their songs. In their music, the twins address various topics related to black culture, peripheral living, sex and ostentation; further, they talk about fashion, confidence and self-esteem.

The rise began with the release of the EP Rouff (2019) and consolidated with the EP Directoria (2021). The good repercussion of the album led to an invitation to participate in the albums of Ludmilla, Djonga, Gloria Groove: Vilã (2023), Lady Leste (2022) and O Dono do Lugar (2022), respectively.

== Biography ==
Tasha Okereke and Tracie Okereke grew up in Jardim Peri, in the North Zone of São Paulo. They are the daughters of Roseane Aparecida do Nascimento and James Okereke. Okereke is a surname of African origin. It comes from their Nigerian father, as their mother is Brazilian. Both were arrested at different times for undisclosed reasons, which caused the girls to alternate between their childhood homes. There was also a period when the mother, with whom they spent most of that phase of their lives, moved to another city and they, as teenagers, had to support themselves. They worked in a store, restaurant and telemarketing. At 17, they already lived alone and had to work to pay the rent.

Sisters of Bitrinho, one of the founders of Batalha do Santa Cruz, the sisters still very young attended a rhyming battle in the São Paulo rap scene, responsible for revealing names like Projota, Emicida and Rashid. They met Drik Barbosa and were encouraged by the rapper to start the blog "Expensive Shit".

== Musical career ==
At the age of 16, they attended Batalha de Santa Cruz, an open space for rhymes at the exit of the Santa Cruz Metro. There, they watched women who became their references. However, as they needed money, they were unable to start their career with rhymes, as they would like. As such, they started DJing, and learned everything by themselves without the necessary equipment and under judgmental eyes. Thanks to the duo's musical curation, it worked. As the sisters' set rocked the night, they prepared to become MCs. Since they were little, they were sure that they wanted to make music, but, out of respect for Hip Hop, they didn't have the courage. Because they started to gain control, they saw what their work had to offer the movement.

The univitelline twins became more and more known in the underground scene of São Paulo, for starting in national rap as DJs, and dedicating themselves to other areas as art directors, designers and speakers, calling themselves "peripheral activists". Until they signed with the Ceia ent seal. and finally debut as MCs, launching the first musical project "Cachorra Kmikze", soon after the acclaimed EP "Rouff" was released, in partnership with rapper Ashira. The EP reached one million streams.

In 2020, they released the song "Tang" in partnership with rapper Kyan, which later went viral on the social network TikTok. Throughout 2020, they released the songs "Pouco", "Agouro" and "Salve", occupying more and more space in the music scene.

=== 2021–present: Diretoria and national recognition ===
In 2022, the duo was nominated for several awards, including winning the "Revelation" category of the WME Awards by Music2 and Singer Revelation of the Geração Glamor Award, they were the only Brazilians nominated for the BET Hip Hop Awards 2022 in the category "Best International Flow ", as well as being nominated for the 2022 Multishow Award in the categories "Double of the Year" and "Revelation of the Year". In April 2022, they graced the cover of Elle magazine.

In February, they caught the attention of the public when they participated in the new album by singer Gloria Groove, "Lady Leste". The sisters shared vocals with Glória on "Pisando Fofo". In August, they announced the departure of the Ceia Ent label. to pursue independent careers in music with their own company "Expensive Shit".

In the same year, the sisters performed on the Rock in Rio stage and at important festivals such as Primavera Sound, CENA 2K22, Coala Festival and Rock the Mountain.

In 2023, the rappers announced the creation of a label, their own studio and the release of two new albums. The first, following the trend of the single "Willy", will be love songs and hits the platforms in the first half. The second will be denser and will talk about the history of the duo. In February 2023, they released, in partnership with the singer Ludmilla, the song "Sou Má".

== Discography ==
Extended plays

- Rouff (2019)
- Diretoria (2021)
- Yin Yang (2023)

== Awards and nominations ==
Year	Award	Category	Result	Ref.
2021	MTV MIAW BRASIL	Beat BR	Nominated	
2022	WME Awards	Best New Artist	Won	
2022	BET Hip Hop Awards 2022	Best Internacional Flow	Nominated	
2022	Multishow Brazilian Music Award	Duo of the Year	Nominated	
2022	Multishow Brazilian Music Award	Artist of the Year	Nominated	
2022	Award Geração Glamour	Breakthrough Artist of the Year	Won	
