= Numanice 2 =

- Standard cover

Studio album by Ludmilla
- Released: 26 January 2022
- Recorded: 2020
- Genre: Pagode
- Length: 26:43
- Language: Portuguese
- Label: Warner Music Brazil
- Producer: Ludmilla (exec.); Rafael Castilhol

Ludmilla chronology
Numanice (2020)	Numanice 2 (2022)	Numanice 2: Ao Vivo (2023)

Singles from Numanice 2
- 1. "Maldivas" Released: 26 January 2022

Numanice 2 (stylized as Numanice #2) is the fourth studio album by Brazilian singer Ludmilla, released on January 26, 2022, through Warner Music Brasil. The album won the 23rd edition of the Latin Grammy Awards in the category Best Samba/Pagode Album.

== Accolades ==
Awards and nominations for Numanice 2
Year	Organization	Award	Result	Ref.
2022	Multishow Brazilian Music Award	Album of the Year	Nominated	
2022	Latin Grammy Awards	Best Samba/Pagode Album	Won	

== Track listing ==
All tracks produced by Rafael Castilhol.

Numanice 2 track listing
No.	Title	Writer(s)	Length
1.	"Meu Homem é Seu Homem"	Ludmilla	2:37
2.	"Me Arrepender"	Ludmilla; Bruno Gabryel	2:19
3.	"212"	Ludmilla; Jefferson Junior; Umberto Tavares	2:27
4.	"Cabelo Cacheado"	Ludmilla	2:35
5.	"Maldivas"	Ludmilla	2:44
6.	"Maria Joana"	Ludmilla	2:34
7.	"Quem é Você"	Ludmilla; Castilhol	2:51
8.	"Fora de Si"	Ludmilla	2:25
9.	"Meu Desapego"	Ludmilla; Junior; Tavares	3:33
10.	"Eu Estive Aqui"	Ludmilla; Junior; Tavares	2:34
Total length:			26:43

== Certifications ==
Certifications for Numanice 2
Region	Certification	Certified units/sales
Brazil (Pro-Música Brasil)	Gold	40,000^{‡}
^{‡} Sales+streaming figures based on certification alone.

== Release history ==
Release dates and formats for Numanice 2
Region	Date	Format	Version	Label	Ref.
Various	26 January 2022	digital download; streaming	Standard	Warner Music Brazil	
