= Ludmilla (singer) =

Brazilian singer-songwriter (born 1995)

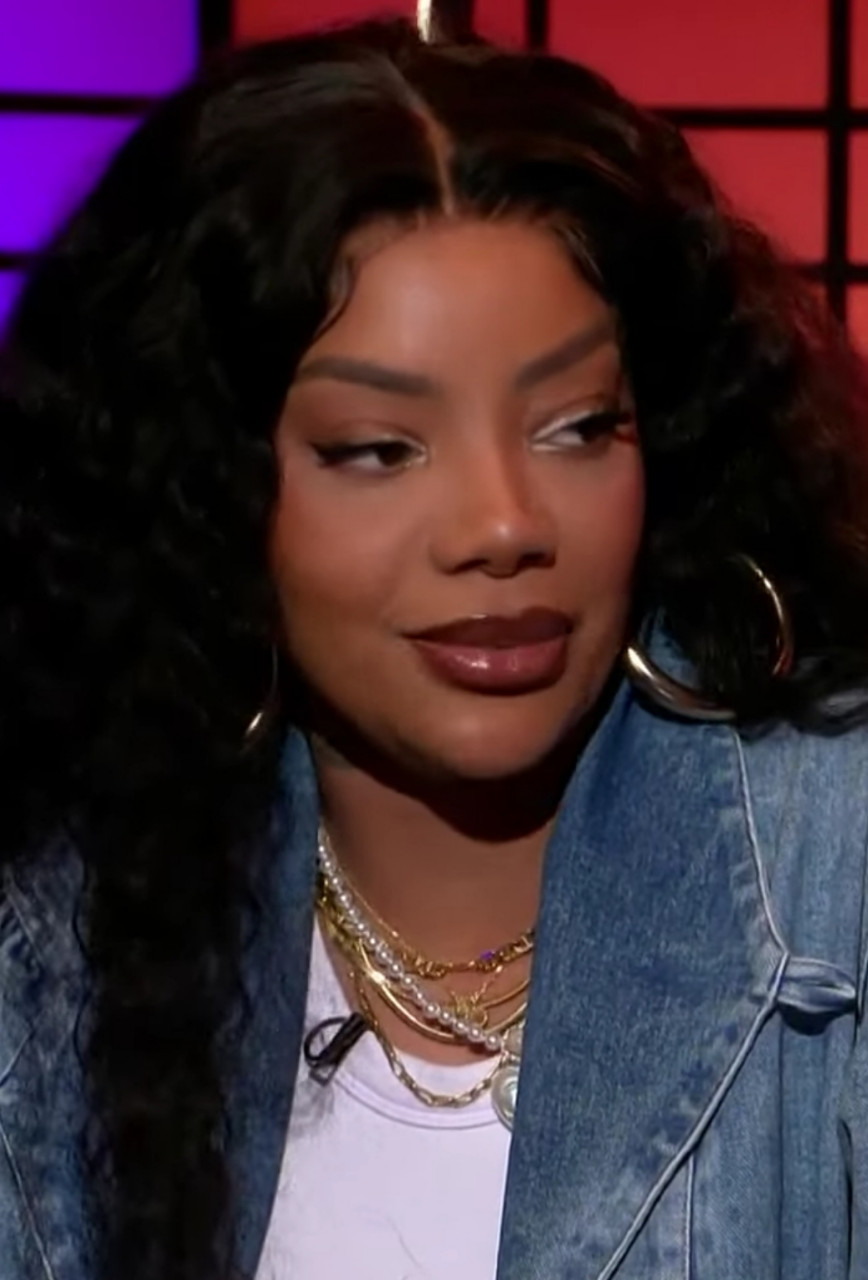
- Ludmilla in 2024
- Born: Ludmila Oliveira da Silva; 24 April 1995 (age 31); Rio de Janeiro, Brazil
- Other name: MC Beyoncé (2012–13)
- Occupations: Singer; songwriter; actress
- Years active: 2012–present
- Works: Discography
- Spouse: Brunna Gonçalves (m. 2019)
- Musical career
- Genres: Pop; funk carioca; R&B; pagode
- Instruments: Vocals; guitar; drums; berimbau
- Label: Warner
- Website: ludmillaoficial.com

Ludmila Oliveira da Silva (born 24 April 1995), known mononymously as Ludmilla (Portuguese pronunciation: [ludʒiˈmilɐ] loo-ji-mi-la), is a Brazilian singer-songwriter who became known with the song "Fala Mal de Mim" (English: "talk smack about me"). In September 2020, she became the first Afro-Latin American female musician to reach one billion streams on Spotify.

== Early life ==
Ludmila was born in Rio de Janeiro and raised in nearby Duque de Caxias. Her original stage name, ‘MC Beyoncé’, was inspired by her love of American performer Beyoncé, a name she had to change due to copyright reasons. At the start of her musical journey, Ludmilla was considered an emergent female artist to watch-out for in funk carioca.

== Career ==
=== 2012: MC Beyoncé ===
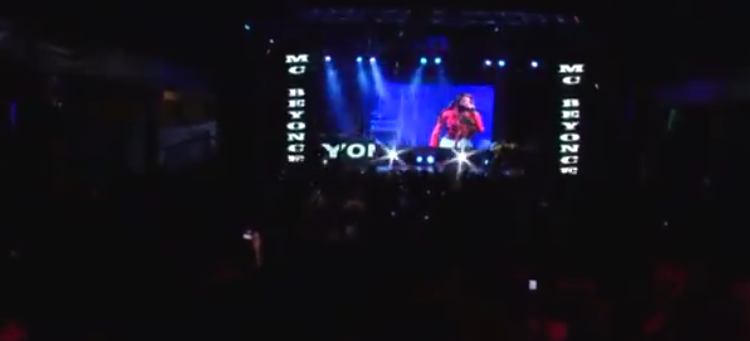
Ludmilla as MC Beyoncé in concert in 2013

Ludmilla began posting videos on YouTube singing, until one day she was asked to sing and rap by a DJ at a party. The performance was well received.

Ludmilla's music career took off after her breakout hit single "Fala Mal de Mim" (released as MC Beyoncé) posted on YouTube went viral. The song was first posted in May 2012 and it has since accumulated more than 17 million views. The official music video was posted in October of the same year and has since accumulated more than 15 million views.

The song was produced by DJ Will 22 and the song's introduction includes a sample of the gospel classic "Oh Happy Day" covered by the St. Francis Choir in the film Sister Act 2: Back in the Habit. Since her rise to fame, she has been touring around Brazil and has made numerous appearances on popular television shows. In an interview with SBT's TV show Domingo Legal, Ludmilla revealed that her former stage name was given to her by her friends because she was such a huge Beyoncé fan.

=== 2013: Name change ===
In 2013, Ludmilla said she was threatened by her manager. The singer recorded a video saying:

Hi, guys, I'm not here to give good news. My dream was always to have a band, dancers, everything. Only I found that I was being too stolen by my manager. So I did not want in my whole life, stay in that sameness, I wanted band, dancers, being an artist himself. And he never wanted to invest in me. When I try to walk with my own legs, he began to make threatenings my family, my mother, myself to death. Ending my dream. So I wanted to tell you guys that I'm no longer singing, the MC Beyoncé is over.

— Ludmilla

Then the singer recorded another video, saying the previous video was a misunderstanding and that she would continue her career. However, the disagreement between her and her manager, Roba Cena, resulted in MC Beyoncé being unable to keep her name as MC Beyoncé because her manager owned the rights to the name. Hours later she recanted and announced on Twitter that she would not quit singing, but she would quit with her manager and start a new career under a new stage name, Ludmilla, her birth name.

However, it is likely the name change was due to potential litigations from the more internationally known singer Beyoncé.

=== 2014–2015: Hoje and first album ===
In early 2014, Ludmilla resumed her career with new look and signed a contract with Warner Music Brazil to release her first album with the label with pop roots and leaving "MC" out of her stage name. In an interview with Radio BEAT98, she explained that many people in the music business are prejudiced when the artist comes with "MC" in the name, even if the music is good.

The new phase includes a decent Star staff. There are 16 professionals, including band, dancers, DJ, a sound technician, plus two personal stylist and two advisers. With tripled cache and a number reaches thirty concerts a month.

On 14 January 2014, the song ''Sem Querer'' was released on iTunes as the first single of her career under her real name. The official music video was released a day later. On June 20, 2014, Ludmilla released the song "Hoje", which was part of the soundtrack of the telenovela Império on Rede Globo, and its respective music video. Ludmilla announced by their social networks to launch the music video of her third single ''Te Ensinei Certin'' composed of single Jhama. The music video premiered on 10 February 2015, in Multishow channel and soon after on YouTube. The video features the direction of John Woo and Rabu Gonzales. On 1 June 2015, it was released the single ''Não Quero Mais''. The music video directed by Rafael Rocha and Lucas Carneiro Neves and was launched on 13 July 2015. The disc version includes the participation of the singer Belo, but for the single release as a solo version was performed. The song ''24 Horas por Dia' was released on 15 October 2015, in Brazilian radio as the fifth single from the album. The music video was released on 18 December 2015, on YouTube, and was directed by Felipe Sassi.

"Hoje" was also the name of her first studio album, which was released on 26 August 2014. The album also included the singles "Sem Querer", "Te Ensinei Certin", "Não Quero Mais" and "24 Horas por Dia".

=== 2021–present: Lud Sessions, Numanice 2 and Vilã ===
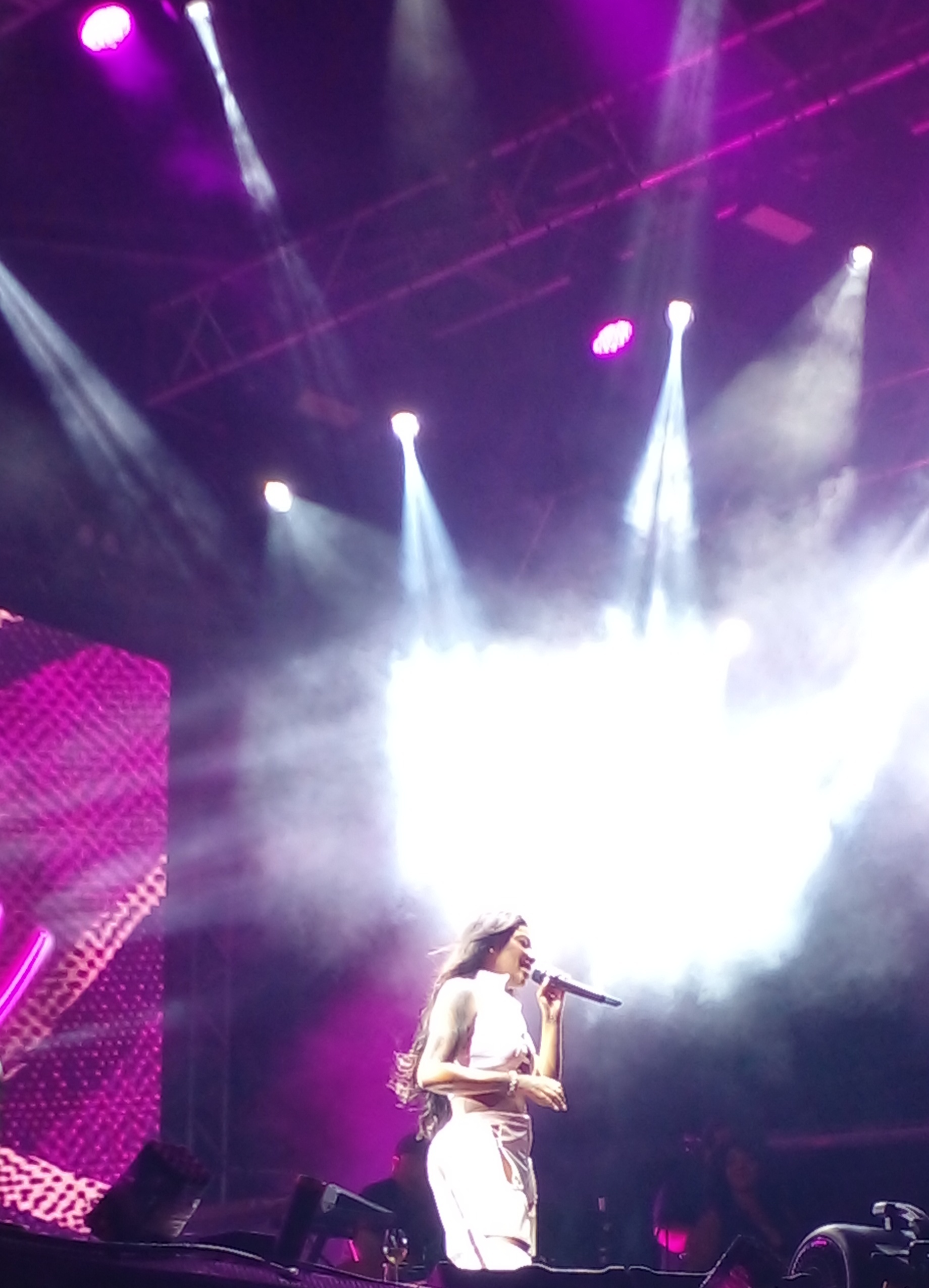
Ludmilla live in Angra dos Reis (2023)

The live version of the EP Numanice (2020), entitled Numanice (Ao Vivo), was released on 29 January 2021, featuring artists such as Thiaguinho, Bruno Cardoso and the group Vou pro Sereno. On 28 May, the singer released the first edition of the acoustic project Lud Sessions with rapper Xamã. The second part of the Lud Sessions project was released on 14 July and featured singer Gloria Groove. A live version featuring Groove was released on 23 December 2021.

Ludmilla released her fourth studio album titled Numanice 2 on 26 January 2022, the project earned the singer a Latin Grammy for Best Samba/Pagode Album. On 23 March of the same year, the EP Back to Be was released. The third part of the "Lud Session" project was released on 30 June 2022, and featured Brazilian singer Luísa Sonza. On 23 August 2022, Ludmilla released her third live album, Numanice 2: Ao Vivo recorded at Museum of Tomorrow, in Rio de Janeiro.

At the 2023 Rio de Janeiro Carnival, Ludmilla debuted as a samba-enredo interpreter, participating in the Beija-Flor parade alongside veteran Neguinho da Beija-Flor, in addition to commanding his block Fervo da Lud. In the same year, she released the double single "Sou Má" and "Nasci Pra Vencer", tracks that will integrate her fifth studio album Vilã, which will be released on 24 March.

== Artistry ==
=== Musical style and voice ===
Ludmilla's primary musical style is rooted in Brazilian funk carioca. However, throughout her career, she has collaborated with many other artists and explored other global styles, such as pop, R&B, reggaetón, axé, afrobeat, pagode, pagode baiano and trap. Ludmilla is among the few modern popular Brazilian performers to collaborate with Spanish-language artists, notably from the reggaetón genre, including the Puerto Rican-American singer Mariah Angeliq, and Emilia (from Argentina). In 2023, she collaborated with David Guetta, Bebe Rexha and LIT Killah on “I’m Good (Blue)”, an updated version of the Eiffel 65 song “Blue” (originally released in 1998).

Ludmilla's voice is classified as a mezzo-soprano, whose vocal range covers 3.2 octaves. Vocal agility is her singing strength, even with little apparent training, Ludmilla manages to perform melismas of considerable difficulty in fast tempos, demonstrating the potential of her small and delicate singing instrument; his previous aptitude for the mixed register is also not left out. Ludmilla does not demonstrate an exquisite knowledge of reconciling support with breathing, making her high notes in a mixed register become tense and less salubrious, even though she has ease with this region of her voice. The way Ludmilla articulates also makes the air flow less fluid, making her phrasing less clear and precise.

=== Influences ===
Ludmilla cites the North American singer Beyoncé as the biggest musical reference for her career. In an interview with the Brazilian Sunday television program Caldeirão do Huck on Rede Globo, the Brazilian said "When I discovered her work, I had a better direction for what I wanted to do. I started buying more CDs, DVDs and everything else. I got a tattoo with the name of her song on her waist. Today, I'm where I am". Ludmilla honored her by choosing her first stage name named MC Beyoncé. In 2019, a re-recording of the song "Halo" was included by Ludmilla on her album Hello Mundo as a tribute to Beyoncé.

== Personal life ==
Ludmilla identifies as bisexual, having had relationships with both men and women. She had a brief relationship with footballer Gabriel Jesus. In October 2018, she began a relationship with dancer Brunna Gonçalves. The couple married on 16 December 2019, in a ceremony held at their residence. On 14 May 2025, their daughter Zuri was born.

== Discography ==
- Hoje (2014)
- A Danada Sou Eu (2016)
- Hello Mundo (2019)
- Numanice 2 (2022)
- Vilã (2023)
- Numanice 3 (2024)
- Fragmentos (2025)

== Filmography ==
=== Film ===
Year	Title	Role
2018	O Amor Dá Trabalho	Iansã
2021	Moscow	Lud
2023	Fast X	Race Starter

=== Television ===
Year	Work	Role	Note
2015	Ambitious Women	Herself	Episode: "19 March 2015"
2015	Forever and Ever	Herself	Episode: "May 4, 2015"
2015	#PartiuShopping	Herself	Episode 13: "Um Bonde Chamado Ostentação"
2015	I Love Paraisópolis	Herself	Episode: "October 5, 2015"
2015	Lucky Ladies	Herself	Episode: "O Show" (Season 1, Episode 3); Episode: "A Reconciliação" (Season 1, Episode 4)
2015	Vai Que Cola	Tiziane Ribeiro / Toinha	Episode: "Tiziane, a Heredeira" (Season 3, Episode 17)
2015	Hora do Faro	Special presenter	
2016	The Ride MTV	Special presenter	
2016	Malhação	Herself	Episode 250: "02 August, 2016" (Season 23)
2016	X Factor	Mentor	
2016	Mister Brau	Rosinha	Episode: "O Aniversário de Michele"
2016	Truque VIP	Participant	
2019	Show dos Famosos	Participant	Season 3
2020	SóTocaTop: Verão	Presenter	
2021–22	The Voice +	Mentor	
2021	Ludmilla: Rainha da Favela	Herself	
2022	Dissident Archangel	Diana	
2023	Mulheres Fantásticas	Narrator	Episode: "Rosa Parks"
2023	Minha Mãe Cozinha Melhor que a Sua	Participant (3rd place)	Season 1
2023	Never Give Up	Herself	Episode: "May 13th"
2023	The Voice Brasil	Mentor	

== Awards and nominations ==
Year	Award	Category	Nominated work	Result
2014	Radio Music Awards Brasil	Revelação	Ludmilla	Won
2014	Radio Music Awards Brasil	Melhor Álbum	Hoje	Nominated
2014	Radio Music Awards Brasil	Melhor Música	Hoje	Nominated
2014	Radio Music Awards Brasil	Melhor Videoclipe	Hoje	Nominated
2014	Retrospetiva UOL	Melhor Álbum	Hoje	Nominated
2015	Troféu Internet	Melhor Cantora	Ludmilla	Nominated
2015	Brasil Music Awards	Artista do Ano	Ludmilla	Nominated
2015	Brasil Music Awards	Artista Feminino	Ludmilla	Nominated
2015	Brasil Music Awards	Artista Revelação	Ludmilla	Nominated
2015	Brasil Music Awards	Clipe do Ano	"Hoje"	Nominated
2015	Prêmio Multishow	Música Chiclete	"Hoje"	Nominated
2015	MTV Europe Music Awards	Melhor Artista Brasileiro	Ludmilla	Nominated
2015	Meus Prêmios Nick	Revelação Musical	Ludmilla	Nominated
2015	Radio Music Awards Brasil	Melhor Cantora	Ludmilla	Nominated
2015	Radio Music Awards Brasil	Melhor Música	"Te Ensinei Certin"	Nominated
2015	Radio Music Awards Brasil	Melhor Coreografia	"Te Ensinei Certin"	Won
2015	Melhores do Ano	Música do Ano	''Hoje''	Won
2015	Melhores do Ano da FM O Dia	Melhor Música	"Te Ensinei Certin"	Nominated
2015	Melhores do Ano da FM O Dia	Melhor Artista	Ludmilla	Nominated
2017	Latin Grammy Awards	Best Portuguese Language Contemporary Pop Album.	A Danada Sou Eu	Nominated
2019	PLAY Portuguese Music Awards	Lusophony Award	Ludmilla	Nominated
2020	Prêmio Multishow	Canção do Ano	"Verdinha"	Won
2022	Latin Grammy Awards	Best Samba/Pagode Album	Numanice #2	Won

== Tours ==
- Tour Poder da Preta (2015–16)
- Tour Danada (2017–18)
- Hello Mundo Tour (2019–20)
- Numanice Tour (2023)
- Ludmilla in the House Tour (2024)
