= 2022 MTV MIAW Awards Brazil =

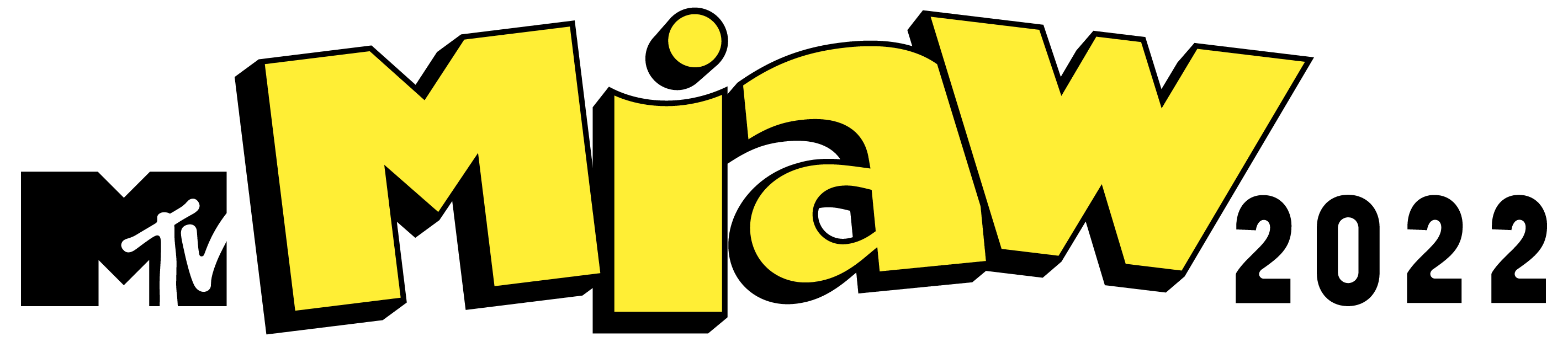
- Camila Queiroz and Xamã at the ceremony promo
- Date: 26 July 2022
- Location: Vibra Hall, São Paulo
- Hosted by: Camila Queiroz and Xamã

Highlights
- Most wins: Manu Gavassi (3)
- Most nominations: Anitta (7); Gloria Groove (7)
- Website: www.mtv.com.br

Television/radio coverage
- Network: MTV; TikTok; Paramount+; Pluto TV; Facebook

The 5th Annual MTV MIAW Awards Brazil took place at Vibra Hall, in São Paulo. The awards celebrated the best of Brazilian music and the digital world of the millennial generation. Presented by actress Camila Queiroz and rapper Xamã, it was the first ceremony since the 2019 edition to have an audience, due to the COVID-19 pandemic.

== Performers ==
The first performances were announced on 21 July. The first artists were: Ludmilla, Jão, Matuê, Teto, Wiu and Xamã. Luísa Sonza, Pedro Sampaio, Skank, Zakes Bantwini and MC Pedrinho were announced on July 25.

Artist(s)	Song(s)	Ref
Pedro Sampaio and MC Pedrinho	"Dançarina"	
Matuê, Teto and Wiu	"Vampiro"	
Skank and Jão	"Ainda Gosto Dela" / "Idiota"	
Xamã and Zakes Bantwini	"Malvadão 3" / "Osama"	
Camila Pitanga, Caio Prado, Larissa Luz, Renegado and Any Gabrielly	Tributo a Elza Soares: "Comigo" "A Carne" "Mulher do Fim do Mundo"	
Luísa Sonza and Ludmilla	"Cachorrinhas" (Sonza) "Café da Manhã" (Ludmilla e Sonza) "Socadona" (Ludmilla)	

== Winners and nominees ==
Winners are listed first and highlighted in bold.

=== Music ===
Musical Artist	Aposta Miaw
**Ludmilla**; Anitta; Gloria Groove; Luísa Sonza; L7nnon; Matuê; Pedro Sampaio; Zé Felipe	**Gabb**; Borges; Clarissa; Fbc & Vhoor; Grag Queen; Heber Souza; Letticia Munniz; Tasha & Tracie
Beat BR	DJ Lanso a Braba
**MC Cabelinho**; Costa Gold; Djonga; Filipe Ret; Flora Matos; Karol Conká; L7nnon; Xamã	**KVSH**; DJ Topo; Pedro Sampaio; Papatinho; Lucas Beat; Alok; Dennis; WC no Beat
Trap na Cena	¡Me Gusta!
**Chefin**; Dfideliz; Hyperanhas; Kawe; Matuê; MC Poze do Rodo; MD Chefe; Teto	**Tini**; Lali; Danna Paola; Rosalía; J Balvin; Bad Bunny; Karol G; Maluma
Album of the Year	Clipão da Porra
**Pirata – Jão**; Baile – FBC & VHOOR; Lady Leste – Gloria Groove; Little Hair – MC Cabelinho; Numanice 2 – Ludmilla; QVVJFA? – Baco Exu do Blues; Roteiro pra Aïnouz – Don L; Versions of Me – Anitta	**"Bossa Nossa" – Manu Gavassi**; "A Queda" – Gloria Groove; "Dar Uma Deitchada" – Duda Beat; "Gotham é Aqui" – Baco Exu do Blues; "Idiota" – Jão; "Pílula Vermelha, Pílula Azul" – Rashid; "Proposta" – Gilsons; "Sonho" – Nego Bala
Feat. Nacional	Hymn of the Year
**"Passando o Rodo" – Pocah, Lara Silva, Mirella and Tainá Costa**; "Afogado" – Gustavo Mioto and Ludmilla; "Café da Manhã" – Luísa Sonza and Ludmilla; "Me Sinto Abençoado" – MC Poze do Rodo (feat. Filipe Ret); "Veja Baby" – Lagum and Marina Sena; "Se Essa B*nda" – Costa Gold (feat. Kawe); "Trago Seu Amor de Volta" – Pabllo Vittar and Dilsinho; "Vampiro" – Matuê, Teto e WIU	**"Dançarina" – Pedro Sampaio (feat. MC Pedrinho)**; "A Queda" – Gloria Groove; "Idiota" – Jão; "Malvada" – Zé Felipe; "Malvadão 3" – Xamã; "Sentadona Remix" – Luísa Sonza, Davi Kneip, Mc Frog e Dj Gabriel do Borel; "Socadona" – Ludmilla, Mariah Angeliq, Topo La Maskara (feat. Mr Vegas); "Vampiro" – Matuê, Teto and WIU
Hino de Karaokê	Coreô Envolvente
**"Esqueça-Me Se For Capaz" – Marília Mendonça and Maiara & Maraisa**; "Erro Planejado" – Luan Santana (feat. Henrique & Juliano); "Idiota" – Jão; "Maldivas" – Ludmilla; "Malvada" – Zé Felipe; "Parada Louca" – Mari Fernandez and Marcynho Sensação; "Putariazinha" – Felipe Amorim; "Trago Seu Amor de Volta" – Pabllo Vittar and Dilsinho	**"Malvada" – Zé Felipe**; "Sentadona Remix" – Luísa Sonza, Davi Kneip, Mc Frog e Dj Gabriel do Borel; "Envolver" – Anitta; "Leilão" – Gloria Groove; "Socadona" – Ludmilla, Mariah Angeliq, Topo La Maskara (feat. Mr Vegas); "Bruta" – Lexa; "Desenrola Bate Joga de Ladin" – L7nnon e Os Hawaianos; "Dançarina" – Pedro Sampaio (feat. MC Pedrinho)
Global Hit
**"My Universe" – Coldplay and BTS**; "As It Was" – Harry Styles; "Cold Heart (Pnau Remix)" – Elton John e Dua Lipa; "Envolver" – Anitta; "Happier Than Ever" – Billie Eilish; "It'll Be Okay" – Shawn Mendes; "One Right Now" – Post Malone e The Weeknd; "Woman" – Doja Cat

=== Digital ===
Transforma Direitos Humanos	Transforma Orgulho PCD
**Júlio Lancellotti**	**Pequena Lo**
Transforma Meio Ambiente	Miaw Icon
**Alice Pataxó**	**Gkay**; Anitta; Casimiro; Gloria Groove; Linn da Quebrada; Mano Brown; Pabllo Vittar; Paulo André
From Brasil!	Creator Supremo
**Any Gabrielly**; André Lamoglia; Anitta; Luva de Pedreiro; Giovanna Grigio; Grag Queen; Pabllo Vittar; Rayssa Leal	**Junior Caldeirão**; Vanessa Lopes; Virginia Fonseca; Casimiro; Christian Figueiredo; Gkay; Camilla de Lucas; Camila Loures
Miaw Fashion	Orgulho do Vale
**Lelê Burnier**; João Guilherme; Sabrina Sato; Marina Gregory; Camila Queiroz; Halessia; Marina Ruy Barbosa; Akeen	**Carol Biazin**; Linn da Quebrada; Grag Queen; Gloria Groove; Luiza Martins; Majur; MC Trans; Stefan Costa
Vem Ni Mim	Black Star Rising por BET
**Alvaro**; Lipe Ribeiro; Viih Tube; Vanessa Lopes; João Guilherme; Paulo André; Lara Silva; Ingrid Ohara	**Ramana Borba**; MD Chefe; Jhordan Matheus; Agnes Nunes; Rizia Cerqueira; Jacy Carvalho; MC Soffia; Urias
Hitou no Passinho	Miaw Futebol Clube
**Virgínia Fonseca**; Vanessa Lopes; Luara; Maria Clara Garcia; Klayver Pop; Maria Paula Marques; Luccas Abreu; Beca Barreto	**Casimiro**; Neymar Jr; Vinicius Jr; Gabigol; Luva de Pedreiro; Gio Queiroz; Raquel Freestyle; Renata Silveira
Podcast Nosso de Cada Dia	Streamer BR
**Podcats**; Podpah; PodDelas; Não é TPM; Mano a Mano; Modus Operandi; Um Milkshake Chamado Wanda; Não Inviabilize	**Casimiro**; Rebeca Gamer; Nobru; Gaules; Samira Close; Cellbit; Coringa; Loud Babi
Saúde tá ok	Fav do TikTok
**Thais Carla**; Bela Gil; Alexandra Gurgel; Surfistas Negras; Ellen Valias (Atleta de Peso); Emanuel Aragão; Sapa Vegana; Bella Falconi	**Maria Lúcia**; Barbaba Coura; Delícia da Eleni; Junior Caldeirão; Luva de Pedreiro; Rapha Vicente; Thallysson; Vanessa Lopes
Meme Master	Pet Influencer
**Gustavo Tubarão**; Rafa Uccman; Isaías; Raphael Vicente; Pequena Lo; Vittor Fernando; Yarley; Raquel Real	**Aipim (Manu Gavassi)**; Bica; Céu (Camila Queiroz); Tobias (Nanda Terra); Leona (Thiago Ventura); Gudan, o Husky; Regina (Whindersson Nunes); Guilhermina (Larissa Manoela)
Dupla de Milhões	Fandom Real Oficial
**Virgínia e Zé Felipe**; Igão e Mítico (Podpah); Tata Estaniecki e Boo (PodDelas); Paulo André e Pedro Scooby (BBB); Álvaro e Lucas Guedez; Vanessa Lopes e Maria Clara Garcia; Leo e Jade Picon; Anitta e Bruna Marquezine	**Gavassiers (Manu Gavassi)**; Army (BTS); Beliebers (Justin Bieber); Pontinhos de Luz e Padaria (Arthur Aguiar); Vittarlovers (Pabllo Vittar); Uniters (Now United); Cactos (Juliette); Harries (Harry Styles)

=== Entertainment ===
Ri Alto por Comedy Central	Realeza do Reality
**Whindersson Nunes**; Bruna Louise; Thiago Ventura; Rafael Portugal; Dani Calabresa; Paulo Vieira; Igor Guimarães; Pedro Ottoni	**Rico Melquiades (A Fazenda/Rio Shore)**; Day Feitoza (Casamento às Cegas); Priscilla Alcantara (The Masked Singer Brasil); Natralha (Rio Shore); Carlos Ortega (De Férias com o Ex Caribe ); Bil Araújo (A Fazenda); Paulo André (BBB); Grag Queen (Queen of the Universe)
Maratonei por vc
**Eleven – Millie Bobby Brown (Stranger Things)**; Rue – Zendaya (Euphoria); Emilia – Giovanna Grigio (Rebelde); Liv – Maria Bopp (As Seguidoras); Ivan – André Lamoglia (Élite); Master Chief – Pablo Schreiber (Halo); Juma Marruá – Alanis Guillen (Pantanal); Anita – Camila Queiroz (De Volta aos 15)
