= Lucas Penteado =

Brazilian actor (born 1996)

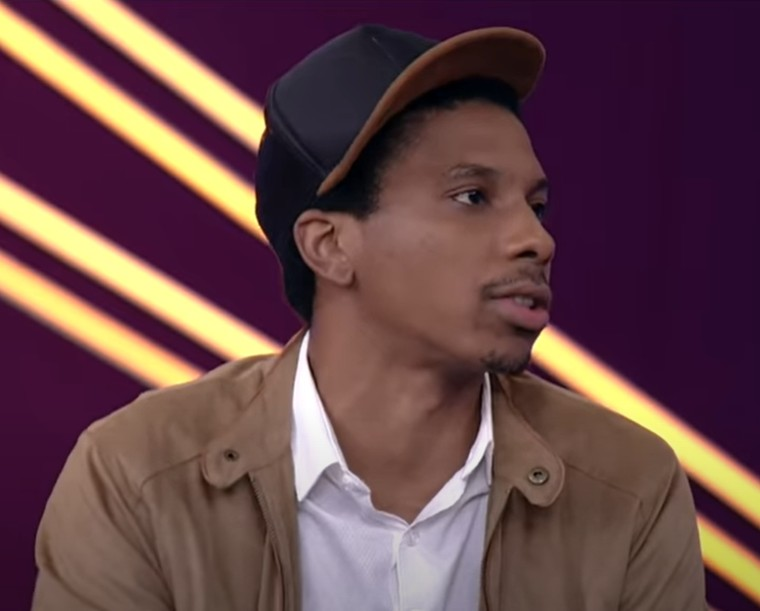
- Penteado in 2021
- Born: 1996 (age 29–30)
- Occupation: Actor
- Notable work: Claudinho in Nosso Sonho

Lucas Penteado (born 1996) is a Brazilian actor.

== Biography ==
He appeared in the 21st season of Big Brother Brazil, but he is best known for playing the role of Claudinho, half of the famous funk carioca duet Claudinho & Buchecha, in the 2023 film Nosso Sonho. This role won him multiple awards, alongside his co-actor Juan Paiva.

During his participation in Big Brother Brazil 21, Lucas revealed that he is a bisexual and umbandist, after the first gay kiss in the show, with Gil do Vigor. During his participation in Big Brother, Lucas had a trouble with participant Karol Conká, where she was accused of committing religious intolerance, moral harassment, biphobia, and psychological abuse. At the time, Lucas received strong support from the public on social media, but eventually gave up participation after almost two weeks on the show. He expressed he experienced financial lost after the incident.

== Personal life ==
He was engaged with Julia Franhani until 2021.
