= Renata Silveira =

Brazilian sports commentator and journalist

- Born: Renata Silveira; November 16, 1989 (age 36); Rio de Janeiro, Rio de Janeiro, Brazil
- Citizenship: Brazilian
- Occupations: Sports commentator, radio broadcaster, and television presenter
- Employer(s): TV Globo; SporTV

Renata Silveira (November 16, 1989) is a Brazilian journalist, sports announcer, and television host. She gained prominence in her career by becoming the first female sports announcer at Grupo Globo. She commentates on sports broadcasts on the SporTV and TV Globo channels.

== Biography ==
=== Early years and education ===
Renata was born in the city of Rio de Janeiro, in a suburban neighborhood, where she grew up. She earned a degree in physical education from the Federal University of Rio de Janeiro (UFRJ). She holds a graduate degree in sports journalism and has been working as a sports announcer since 2014. She worked as a dancer and a teacher of jazz dance, ballet, and tap dance.

=== Career ===
She had the opportunity to call two matches at the 2014 FIFA World Cup held in Brazil. The broadcasts were aired on Rádio Globo. Renata had won a commentary contest held by Rádio Globo; she commentated on the match between Uruguay and Costa Rica, and when one of the station’s regular commentators was absent, Silveira also had the opportunity to commentate on the game between Croatia and Mexico. After that opportunity, Renata did not have any other work as a sports announcer.

In 2018, she was selected from among more than 300 candidates to participate in the program Narra quem sabe, aired on Fox Sports Brasil. Of the more than 300 candidates, six were selected; however, only three were chosen to receive training and provide commentary for the Brazilian national football team during the 2014 FIFA World Cup. Renata was hired by Fox Sports Brasil in September 2018, and her debut was a match in the AFA Liga Profesional de Fútbol featuring the classic River Plate vs. Boca Juniors derby. While at Fox Sports Brasil, Renata commentated on matches from various leagues and became the first female commentator to call a Copa Libertadores final in 2018.

In 2018, while still working for Fox Sports Brasil, Renata broadcast the 2018 FIFA World Cup held in Russia. Alongside Manuela Avena and Isabelly Morais, they formed the first all-female commentary team to cover a World Cup in Brazil.

In December 2020, Grupo Globo announced the hiring of Renata Silveira. With this, Silveira became Grupo Globo’s first female soccer commentator. Her first broadcast for Grupo Globo was on SporTV, covering the match between Moto Club and Botafogo (0–5) during the first round of the 2021 Copa do Brasil. Renata made her debut on TV Globo during the 2022 Copa do Brasil, commentating on the match between Ceilândia Esporte Clube and Botafogo, which ended 0–3. She became the first female commentator on a broadcast television game show on TV Globo in its 56-year history. At the 2022 FIFA World Cup, held in Qatar, she became the first woman to call a World Cup match on Brazilian broadcast television. She was nominated for the 2022 MTV MIAW Awards Brazil, hosted by MTV Brasil in São Paulo, in the “Miaw Futebol Clube” category, but lost to the streamer Casimiro. In 2026, she once again served as a commentator for TV Globo during the 2026 FIFA World Cup, held in the United States, Mexico, and Canada.

== Personal life ==
She has been married to businessman Leandro Guimarães since 2013. The couple has two children. She's a Fluminense FC fan.
