= Um Lugar ao Sol =

Brazilian telenovela

- Genre: Telenovela
- Created by: Lícia Manzo
- Written by: Carla Madeira; Cecília Giannetti; Leonardo Moreira; Marta Góes
- Directed by: Maurício Farias; André Câmara
- Starring: Cauã Reymond; Alinne Moraes; Andreia Horta
- Theme music composer: Manu Chao; Russo Passapusso; Marcelo Seko; Roberto Barreto
- Opening theme: "Sulamericano" by BaianaSystem ft. Manu Chao
- Country of origin: Brazil
- Original language: Portuguese
- No. of seasons: 1
- No. of episodes: 119 (70 International version)

Production
- Producers: Andrea Kelly; Juliana Castro
- Editors: Fábio Villela; Rodrigo Clemente
- Camera setup: Multi-camera

Original release
- Network: TV Globo
- Release: 8 November 2021 – 25 March 2022

Um Lugar ao Sol (English title: In Your Place) is a Brazilian telenovela produced and broadcast by TV Globo. It premiered on 8 November 2021, and ended on 25 March 2022. The telenovela is written by Lícia Manzo, with the collaboration of Carla Madeira, Cecília Giannetti, Leonardo Moreira, and Marta Góes. It stars Cauã Reymond, Alinne Moraes, Andreia Horta, Marco Ricca, Andréa Beltrão, and Marieta Severo.

The series follows Christian who, after the death of his twin brother Christofer, decides to take his place, leaving behind his great love and identity.

== Plot ==
In Goiânia, twin brothers Christian and Christofer are born, lose their mother in childbirth and are left with their father Ernani, who, because of his situation, agrees to give one of his children to a rich couple from Rio de Janeiro, marking the separation of both of the twins when they are about to a year old. Christian is sent to an orphanage, while Christofer is renamed Renato by his adoptive parents. Both grow up unaware of each other's existence.

18 years later, as he says goodbye to his dying his adoptive father, Renato discovers he is adopted and has twin brother from whom he was separated. Outraged, he confronts his adopted mother Elenice, who lies to him, saying that his brother and his biological father are dead. Christian, is forced to leave the orphanage for minors where he grew up, in Goiânia, and also discovers he has been separated from his brother. Dedicated to school and alone in the world and without prospects, becomes underemployed, Christian is forced to shelve his dreams, and only the existence of his brother seems to light up his life. In the hope of finding Renato, he decides to go to Rio de Janeiro. Before leaving he says goodbye to Ravi, his brother at heart, raised in the orphanage with him. Renato goes to Europe with a one-way ticket, willing to stay away from the life he has discovered to be fake.

Ten years later, Christian works as a street vendor at the door of the Nilton Santos Olympic Stadium in the hope of finding his brother. His only clue is a magazine clipping where a man identical to him is watching a match from the stadium's grandstand. Christian meets Lara and falls in love with her. He gives up searching for his twin brother and decides to propose to Lara and start a small business. However, when Ravi is arrested for a theft he did not commit, Christian needs to raise the bail money and with no alternative, he agrees to do a cart for drug dealers and, inadvertently, incurs an even bigger debt. Threatened with death and with no way out, Lara tells him to sell what they have to free Ravi from prison and flee to her grandmother's house in Minas Gerais.

During the escape, Christian randomly meets Renato, who has just returned to Brazil. After spending the early morning together and learning of his Christian’s debt, Renato goes up the hill in his place and, mistaken for him, is killed by the drug dealers. Identical to Renato, Christian emulates his brother's personality and behavior, becoming his double. He decides to leave the past behind, and assumes the identity of Renato, with Ravi as his only confidant, he watches Lara bury the body that was supposedly his, and moves on to a new life, having to deal with the consequences of his choice.

== Cast ==
- Cauã Reymond as Christian and Christofer / Renato
- Alinne Moraes as Bárbara
- Andreia Horta as Lara
- Marco Ricca as Breno
- José de Abreu as Santiago
- Andréa Beltrão as Rebeca
- Marieta Severo as Noca
- Juan Paiva as Ravi
- Ana Beatriz Nogueira as Elenice
  - Lorena Comparato as Young Elenice
- Daniel Dantas as Túlio
- Ana Baird as Nicole
- Mariana Lima as Ilana
- Lara Tremouroux as Joy
- Fernanda de Freitas as Erica
- Danton Mello as Matheus
- Fernando Eiras as Teodoro
- Pathy Dejesus as Ruth
- Yara de Novaes as Inácia
- Stella Freitas as Geize
- Ju Colombo as Dalva
- Fernanda Marques as Cecília
- Bruna Martins as Bela
- Samantha Jones as Adel
- Miguel Schmid as Luan
- Maju Lima as Marie
- Maithê Rodrigues as Yasmin
- Kelly Morales as Thais
- Natália Lage as Gabriela
- Renata Gaspar
- Regina Braga as Ana Virgínia
- Denise Fraga as Júlia
- Gabriel Leone as Felipe
- Cláudia Missura as Lucília
- Rui Resende
- Miguel Schmidith as Luan
- Claudia Mauro as Helena Valentim

=== Guest stars ===
- Patrícia Selonk as Gorete
- Ângela Figueiredo as Mercedes
- Mayara Theresa as Leila
- Pável Reymond as Josias
- Sofia Teixeira as Rosário
- Tonico Pereira as Romero
- Inez Viana as Avany
- Márcio Vito as Ernani Alves dos Santos
  - Gery as Young Ernani
- Genézio de Barros as José Renato Meirelles
  - Rafael Primot as Young José Renato
- Raquel Rocha

== Production ==
In January 2020, casting for the telenovela began. The following month, the first scenes began to be filmed in Prague, Czech Republic. In March 2020, due to the COVID-19 pandemic, Globo suspended indefinitely production of the telenovela, which was scheduled to premiere in May. Filming resumed in November 2020 under strict health protocols, and concluded on 24 September 2021.

== Reception ==
=== Ratings ===
Season	Episodes	First aired		Last aired		Avg. viewers (points)
Season	Episodes	Date	Viewers (points)	Date	Viewers (points)	Avg. viewers (points)
1	119	8 November 2021	25.2	25 March 2022	25.0	22.3

Premiering after more than a year of postponements and following the reruns of three telenovelas, Um Lugar ao Sol saw the worst pilot-episode rating for the traditional primetime slot, drawing a rating of 25.2 points and audience share (proportion of televisions turned on) of 38.7%, worse than the previous lows of a 30.6 rating and a 40.3% audience share set by A Lei do Amor on 3 October 2016.

The lowest rating for the timeslot in recent history was recorded for the eighth episode of Um Lugar ao Sol on 16 November 2021, which was delayed to because a 2022 FIFA World Cup qualification match. The episode drew a rating of 15.6 points was lower than the 16.2 points figure scored by O Sétimo Guardião on 24 December 2018. Compared against the shows that aired on 16 November 2021, Um Lugar ao Sol, in a rare instance, fared worse than the competing RecordTV telenovela Gênesis, which scored 15.8 points.

On Christmas Eve, when television audiences are typically smaller, the 41st episode of Um Lugar ao Sol registered another record-breaking low of 15.4 points.

=== Awards and nominations ===
Year	Award	Category	Nominee(s)	Result	Ref.
2021	Prêmio APCA de Televisão	Best Telenovela	Lícia Manzo	Nominated	
2021	Prêmio APCA de Televisão	Best Actor	Cauã Reymond	Nominated	
2021	Prêmio APCA de Televisão	Best Actor	Juan Paiva	Won	
