= MC Poze do Rodo =

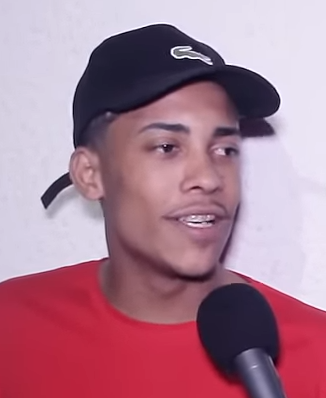
- MC Poze do Rodo being interviewed in 2019

Background information
- Also known as: MC Poze; Pitbull do Funk; Malvadão; Sábio
- Born: Marlon Brendon Coelho Couto da Silva; 5 February 1999 (age 27); Rio de Janeiro, Brazil
- Genres: Trap; Hip hop; Funk carioca
- Occupations: Singer, songwriter
- Years active: 2019–present
- Label: Mainstreet Records

Marlon Brendon Coelho Couto da Silva (born 5 February 1999), better known as MC Poze do Rodo, is a Brazilian singer and songwriter.

== Biography ==
MC Poze do Rodo was born Marlon Brendon Coelho Couto on 5 February 1999 in the Rodo Favela of Santa Cruz, in the West Zone of Rio de Janeiro. His parents named him as a tribute to American actor Marlon Brando. He became involved in crime as an adolescent and was imprisoned for drug trafficking and for his associations with the drug trade. In September 2019, he was arrested for crime apologia, the corruption of minors and drug trafficking during a show in Sorriso, Mato Grosso. After being detained for a few days, he began to see his fortunes shift after one of his songs, Os Coringas do Flamengo, reached 8 million views on YouTube and became one of the main celebration songs of Flamengo after each match that they won at the Libertadores da América and the Campeonato Brasileiro that season. With this success, MC Poze do Rodo was embraced by both the team members and members of the team's fan base.

== Career ==
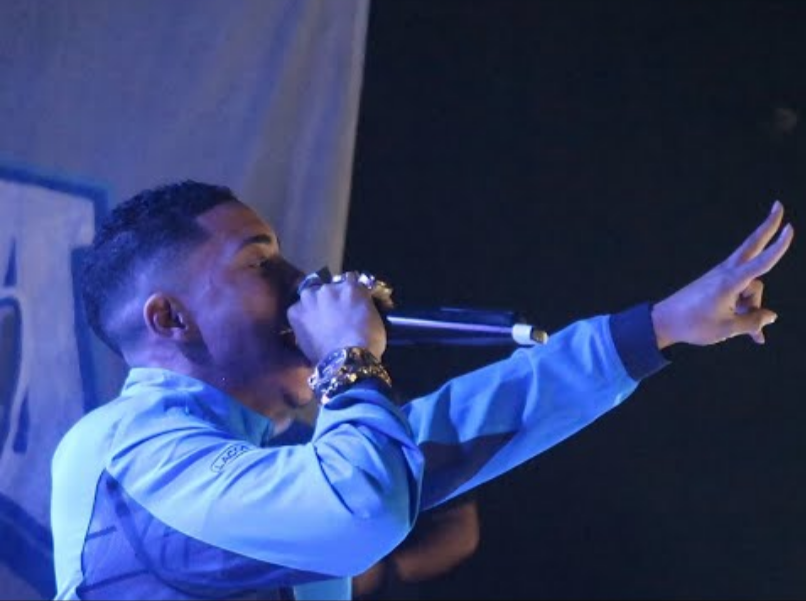
MC Poze during a show in 2022.

MC Poze brought in more than 200,000 Brazilian real through his songs by the middle of 2021. In 2022, he released O Sábio, his first EP. This was preceded by 6 singles released between 2019 and 2021.

He became known for his hit Tô Voando Alto, released in 2019, that spent several weeks on the charts in Brazil. Since then, he has done tours in Europe, including 5 shows in Portugal, Spain, and the United Kingdom, along with a show in Belgium.

His international reach expanded significantly in 2023 when he did a series of shows abroad. In November 2023, MC Poze performed in places such as Pompano Beach, Florida and Newark, New Jersey.

=== Musical style ===
MC Poze is known for his controversial lyrics, characteristic of the subgenre of funk known as "funk proibidão".

Some of his works discuss the complex character with reference to crime apologia in the funk/trap carioca scene, as it situates itself in issues of artistic freedom versus social control. Other topics broached include the reality of being born and raised in urban environments, such as the disputes that can occur in the periphery and the favelas and tensions relating to the dominance of various criminal groups, such as those in Rio de Janeiro. The lyrics, which may contact offensive content, often comment on legal, social, and psychological themes. In this sense, his music is an artistic expression of his condition based on the context of historical, cultural, and political processes which is affected by the penal sphere. This is subject, meanwhile, to the possibility (or impossibility) of a typification referring to illegal conduct, looked down upon and considered offensive by the wider society. Soon, he inserts into the discussion debates relating to the fundamental right of expression, it's limits and it's controversial aspects. In other words, his music denounces various forms of violence.

The involvement of processes relating to his participation in organizations linked to drug trafficking is a presence in MC Poze's life. Frequently, his lyrics contain what is apparent praise of the modus operandi of criminal organizations, which is seen as problematic. These aspects of the artist bring forth the issue of viewing the music as a vehicle which paints the reality of underserved communities in Rio de Janeiro through music.

== Controversies ==
=== "Talvez" and controversy with MC Paiva ===
In November 2022, MC Poze released O Sábio. On the song Talvez, Poze made mention of the Jacarezinho Massacre, where 28 people were killed in a police operation close to Mother's Day in 2021. For the song's music video, he included a police officer named "Paiva" in the video.

The choice to include the officer caused a dispute with São Paulo-based MC Paiva, who posted a sequence of stories on his Instagram profile accusing the artist of taking shots at him. Along with explaining the history between the two, he called MC Poze a "bum", and threatened him, calling on him to meet up and discuss the incident. In the middle of many insults, MC Paiva declared that he could still go around Rio de Janeiro without issue for being positively viewed and insinuated that MC Poze could not do the same in São Paulo. He also revealed that he attempted to get into contact with MC Poze about the situation before, but did not receive a response.

=== Drug trafficking and display of weapons ===
In a statement to police, MC Poze confirmed that he had been involved in drug trafficking in the Rodo favela in 2015 and 2016. He worked as the "vapor" for drug traffickers, where vapors would sell drugs directly to users, but stated to police that he had abandoned drug trafficking after the milícia invaded the favela.

Online, photos and videos circulated of MC Poze appearing to brandish weapons such as rifles, pistols, and a grenade. He asserted, however, that they were referring to a time in which he was a drug trafficker.

=== Operação Rifa Limpa ===
On 1 November 2024, an operation by the Civil Police of Rio de Janeiro State, which investigates illegal raffles, confiscated a number of MC Poze's possessions at his house, including jewels and luxury cars. His wife, Viviane Noronha, and other influencers were also targets of Operação Rifa Limpa.

On 12 November, an expert with the Civil Police who evaluated one of the jewels that was confiscated said that a lace made of gold, copper, silver, and zirconia was worth around 650,000 Brazilian real.

In April 2025, a judge ordered the release of his vehicles and jewels. According to the judge, there was no explanation of the connection between the seized items and the alleged offenses cited by the police.

=== First imprisonment ===
On 29 May 2025, MC Poze was detained by agents from the Delegacia de Repressão aos Entorpecentes (DRE) in a luxury condominium in his mansion in the Recreio dos Bandeirantes neighborhood. The artist was being investigated for crime apologia and involvement with drug trafficking. The police force also claimed that the Comando Vermelho strategically used his shows, often held in areas where drug trafficking organizations operate, to increase their profits with the sale of drugs. The investigation began after videos circulated in a baile in Cidade de Deus where MC Poze was in attendance that showed heavily armed drug traffickers.

On 2 June 2025, the court conceded habeas corpus to him and revoked the temporary imprisonment of MC Poze. The desembargador Peterson Barroso, of the 2nd Criminal Court, decreed his release and the implementation of cautionary measures with regards to the artists. In the decision, Simões criticized the way in which the Civil Police of Rio de Janeiro state carried out his arrest.

MC Poze's conditions for release were the following: 1. Check in with a judge monthly (until the 10th day of the month) to inform of and justify his activities; 2. To not leave the judicial district while the analysis of the merits of the habeas corpus is ongoing; 3. Remain at the will of the court, including responding to phone calls immediately if necessary; 4. Changing addresses without informing a judge is prohibited; and 5. Was prohibited from contacting people being investigated for the same facts involved in the inquiry, witnesses, as well as people connected to the Comando Vermelho; he must also surrender his passport to the original Secretariat of the Judge.

His personal belongings, such as his jewels and cars, as well as his cellphones and tablets, were once again confiscated by the police with his imprisonment. After being released, the artist had his items returned, to which he posted a video with them. He also mentioned, however, that his cellphones and tablets were not returned.

In July of the same year, the Public Prosecutor's Office of the state of Rio de Janeiro denounced MC Poze and 9 other people for allegations of torture and extorsion during a kidnapping. According to investigations by the police and with the prosecutor's office, they claim that MC Poze and his friends acted in a coordinated matter with the use of physical violence to force their manager Renato Medeiros to confess that he had stolen a jewel from the singer. The investigations assert that Medeiros had been kicked, beaten, and hit with a weapon made of wood and nails. Along with this, the former manager had been allegedly burnt with lit cigarettes.

=== Second imprisonment ===
On 15 April 2026, he was temporarily imprisoned during Operação Narcofluxo by the Federal Police of Brazil (PF) against a criminal organization, and was accused of money laudnering and illegal transactions of more than 1.6 billion real.

On 23 April, the Superior Court of Justice (STJ) ruled for the release of Poze after the 5 day temporary prison period initially requested by the PF had passed. That same day, the PF requested for preventative detention to keep the people being investigated in the house, a decision accepted by the court. On 14 May, the federal court mandated his release due to habeas corpus concerns. After his departure, MC Poze continued to deny any involvement with organized crime.

=== CPI das Câmeras ===
In October 2023, MC Poze was summoned by the chamber to testify for the CPI das Câmeras at the Municipal Chamber of Rio de Janeiro, which dealt with stolen cars. He testified that he had his Land Rover Defender stolen and rapidly returned. Accompanied by his lawyer, he chose to exercise his right to remain silent at having received various questions from the chamber.

== Personal life ==
MC Poze currently lives in a mansion in the Recreio dos Bandeirantes neighborhood of the West Zone of Rio de Janeiro. He had a relationship with influencer Viviane Noronha until 2021, with whom they had 3 children. He has 5 children: Júlia, Miguel, Laura, Jade, and Manuela. In January, MC Poze mentioned that the mother to his 6th child, whose identity is not revealed, suffered a miscarriage.

=== Robbery of MC Poze's home ===
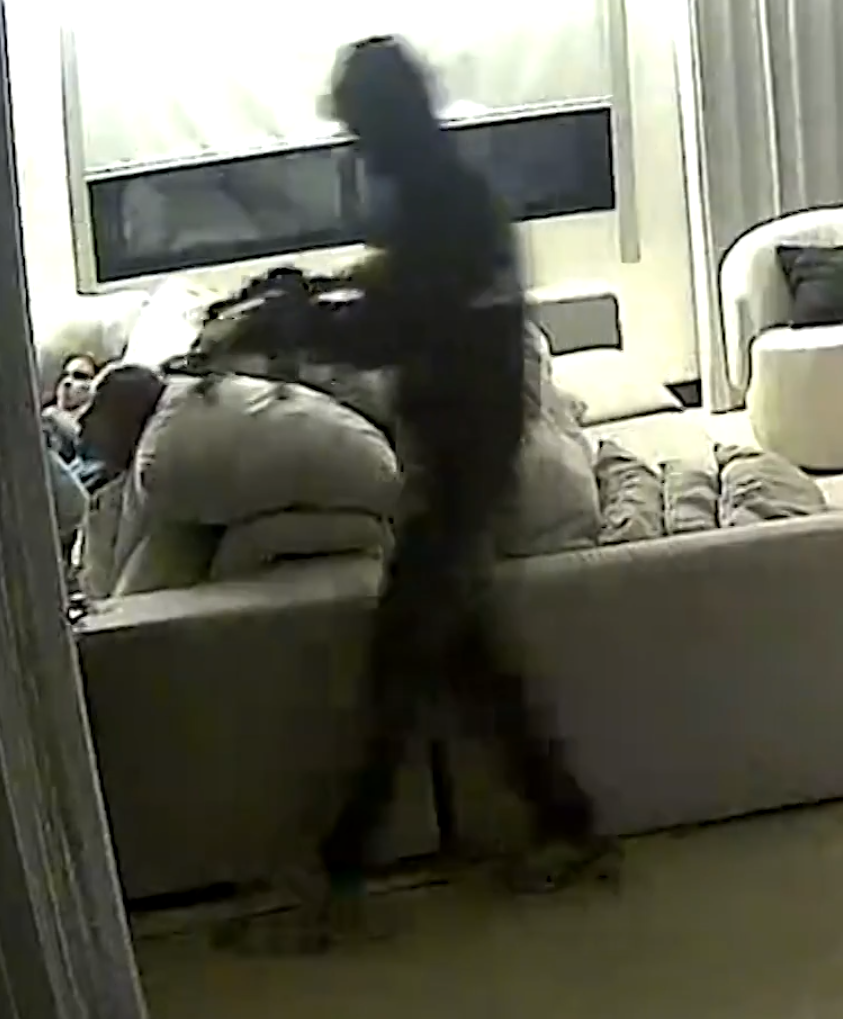
Security camera footage showing one of the assailants, armed with a rifle

On the morning of 31 March 2026, eight robbers invaded MC Poze's condominium in Recreio dos Bandeirantes and took him and his friends hostage. The singer confirmed to the police that the assaulters knew where his jewelry was and, while going to their location, damaged the security cameras so that the crime would not be recorded. The singer also confirmed that the material damage with just the jewelry came out to 2 million real. Even more, according to MC Poze, the thieves also took off with cellphones, clothes, perfume, watches, and 15,000 real in cash. The singer also reported to police that he was held hostage and assaulted by the assailants at the condo. The security camera images showed one of the assailants pointing a rifle at the MC Poze's head and all of the assailants using pistols and rifles on the day of the crime.

== Discography ==
=== Studio albums ===
- O Sábio (2022)
- XEQUE MATE (2026)

=== Singles ===
- "Me Sinto Abençoado" (feat. Filipe Ret): 2021
- "A Cara do Crime (Nós Incomoda)": 2021
- "Vida Louca" (2021)
- "Vida de Chefe" (2019)
- "Tá Fluindo" (2019)
- "Tô Voando Alto" (2019)

== Awards and nominations ==
Year	Award	Category	Nomination	Result	Ref.
2022	MTV Millennial Awards	Feat. Nacional	"Me Sinto Abençoado" – MC Poze do Rodo (ft. Filipe Ret)	Nominated	
2022	MTV Millennial Awards	Trap na Cena	MC Poze do Rodo	Nominated	
