= Claudinho & Buchecha =

Pioneers in the funk carioca genre

- Origin: São Gonçalo, Rio de Janeiro, Brazil
- Genres: Funk carioca
- Years active: –2002
- Past members: Cláudio Rodrigues (Claudinho) (died 2002); Claucirlei Jovêncio de Souza (Buchecha)

Claudinho & Buchecha were an influential Brazilian duo who were pioneers in the funk carioca genre and its associated styles. They were made up of Claudinho (Cláudio Rodrigues) and Buchecha (Claucirlei Jovêncio de Souza), who were childhood friends originating from the city of São Gonçalo in the state of Rio de Janeiro.

== Discography ==
They were twice awarded triple platinum (over 300 thousand sales) status for their albums Claudinho & Buchecha and A Forma, as well as double platinum (over 200 thousand sales) for the album Só Love.

== Death of Claudinho ==
The duo's trajectory came to an abrupt end in 2002, when after the concert for the release of their sixth album, Vamos Dançar, Claudinho was killed in a car accident due to a collision with a tree. On the day of the occurrence, Claudinho elected not to go with the group's van as was usual, asking for a private car to be driven by his manager. This marked the end of the group and had broad repercussion in Brazilian media, still being a newsworthy theme in major media outlets in 2022. The judgement of Claudinho's manager ended with him being absolved of guilt for the crime, while Claudinho's widow sued the company responsible for managing the road, eventually winning the case due to it being proven that the tree was poorly signaled.

== Legacy ==
Claudinho and Buchecha were portrayed by Lucas Penteado and Juan Paiva in the 2023 biographical film Nosso Sonho.
