= Wild & Free (TV series) =

Brazil reality television series

- Also known as: Wild and Free: Florianópolis; Wild and Free: Salvador; Wild and Free: Carnaval
- Genre: Reality
- Music by: Dennis e Cantini
- Opening theme: "Isso Que É Vida"
- Country of origin: Brazil
- Original language: Portuguese
- No. of seasons: 5
- No. of episodes: 57

Production
- Producer: Glauco Sabino Giuliano Caruso
- Production company: Floresta Produções

Original release
- Network: Amazon Prime Video
- Release: March 19, 2020

Related
- De Férias com o Ex; Rio Shore

Wild & Free (Portuguese: Soltos) is a Brazilian reality television series currently airing on Amazon Prime Video.

== Premise ==
Soltos brings together eight and nine young people from different parts of Brazil in a beach house somewhere in the country where they enjoy the hottest parties, get involved in fights, romances and dramas, but always with a lot of fun.

== Overview ==
=== Series 1 – Wild and Free: Florianópolis (2020) ===
The first season (Portuguese: Soltos em Floripa) premiered on March 20, 2020, with two episodes. The list of the original eight participants was revealed on March 10, 2020, and includes cuatt: João Mercuri, Luan Cavati, Murilo Dias and Ramon Bernardes, and four women: Beatriz García, Nathália Gomes, Taynara Nunes and Thais Pereira. The season was filmed in Florianópolis, in Santa Catarina.

Amazon Prime Video also announced six celebrities who will appear as commentators, these were Pabllo Vittar, Felipe Titto, Mariano, MC Carol, John Drops and Bianca Andrade. The bonus episodes titled ''Celebrity rewind'' (where celebrities gave their opinion on the main episode) lasted 30 minutes.

=== Series 2 – Wild and Free: Florianópolis (2021) ===
The second season (Portuguese: Soltos em Floripa) premiered on February 12, 2021. Unlike what happened in the first season, the extra episodes of 'A Resenha' were released on the same day as the respective episodes. The list of contestants for the season was revealed on January 12, 2021. It included Anna Retonde, Beatriz García, Luan Cavati, Murilo Dias, Nathalia Gomes, Ramon Bernardes and Taynara Nunes. Then Renatinho Mello came on to replace Luan after his expulsion.

Pabllo Vittar, Felipe Titto, MC Carol and John Drops returned among the commentators for the extra episodes. Lexa and Jerry Smith joined the group this season.

=== Series 3 – Wild and Free: Salvador (2023) ===
The third season (Portuguese: Soltos em Salvador) premiered on February 24, 2023. The season was filmed in Salvador, Bahia. In the new season, Ricardo Beza, bar manager from Florianópolis (SC), the city where the previous seasons took place, has the opportunity to open a business in Salvador (BA) and asks his group of friends for help with the job during the holidays. Since not everyone is available, new members join the team. Murilo Dias, Renatinho Mello and Thaís Pereira join newcomers Aila Rebouças, Alef Cardoso, Carla Signorelli, Edu de Carli, Gabriel Lopes and Marcela Luíza.

The commentary team includes Felipe Titto, MC Carol, John Drops and newcomers Hugo Gloss and Viih Tube. This season did not include the extra episodes of ''Celebrity rewind'' . At the end of the season, a ninth episode showed the best moments with the commentary panel.

=== Series 4 – Wild and Free: Salvador (2024) ===
The fourth season (Portuguese: Soltos em Salvador) premiered on February 23, 2024. The show was filmed again in Salvador. Murilo Dias did not return after the previous season, and it includes the addition of Tiago Alves and Larissa Gallo.

The commentary panel consisted of John Drops, Lipe Ribeiro, and Pequena Lo, singer Rebecca, and actor Felipe Titto.

=== Series 5 – Wild and Free: Carnaval (2025) ===
The fifth season of the series (Portuguese: Soltos no Carnaval) premiered on February 14, 2025. It was filmed in Rio de Janeiro, during the Rio de Janeiro Carnival, and the cast returned to Salvador before the end of the season. A month before the premiere, it was announced that the cast had been completely revamped. Several members from previous seasons made cameo appearances.

== Cast ==
| Cast members | Series | | | | |
| Cast members | 1 | 2 | 3 | 4 | 5 |
|---|---|---|---|---|---|
| João Mercuri | Main | | | | |
| Ramon Bernardes | Main | Main | | | |
| Luan Cavati | Main | Main | | | |
| Beatriz Garcia | Main | Main | | | Guest |
| Nathália Gomes | Main | Main | | | |
| Taynara Nunes | Main | Main | | | |
| Murilo Dias | Main | Main | Main | | Guest |
| Thais Pereira | Main | | Main | Main | Guest |
| Anna Retonde | | Main | | | |
| Renatinho Mello | | Main | Main | Main | |
| Carla Signorelli | | | Main | | |
| Alef Cardoso | | | Main | Main | Guest |
| Eduardo "Edu" de Carli | | | Main | Main | Guest |
| Gabriel "Biel" Lopes | | | Main | Main | Guest |
| Marcela Luíza | | | Main | Main | |
| Aila Rebouças | | | Main | Main | Guest |
| Tiago Alves | | | | Main | |
| Larissa Gallo | | | | Main | Guest |
| Leo Alcy | | | | | Main |
| Raul Botura | | | | | Main |
| Carla Fernanda | | | | | Main |
| Ruan Mendes | | | | | Main |
| Bianca Moi | | | | | Main |
| Alicia Nery | | | | | Main |
| Jodete Rocha | | | | | Main |
| Gabriel Veiga | | | | | Main |
Panelist
| Bianca Andrade | Commentator | | | | |
| MC Carol | Commentator | Commentator | Commentator | | |
| John Drops | Commentator | Commentator | Commentator | Commentator | |
| Mariano | Commentator | | | | |
| Felipe Titto | Commentator | Commentator | Commentator | Commentator | |
| Pabllo Vittar | Commentator | Commentator | | | |
| Lexa | | Commentator | | | |
| Jerry Smith | | Commentator | | | |
| Hugo Gloss | | | Commentator | | |
| Viih Tube | | | Commentator | | |
| Pequena Lo | | | | Commentator | |
| Rebecca | | | | Commentator | |
| Lipe Ribeiro | | | | Commentator | |

== Episodes ==
| Season | Episodes | Originally released | |
| Season | Episodes | First released | Last released |
|---|---|---|---|
| 1 | 16 | March 19, 2020 | May 5, 2020 |
| 2 | 16 | February 12, 2021 | March 26, 2021 |
| 3 | 9 | February 24, 2023 | April 14, 2023 |
| 4 | 8 | February 23, 2024 | April 12, 2024 |
| 5 | 8 | February 14, 2025 | March 28, 2025 |
