= Nosso Sonho =

Nosso Sonho is a 2023 Brazilian biopic by Eduardo Albergaria, about the rise and fall of the popular funk carioca duet Claudinho & Buchecha. The roles of Claudinho and Buchecha were played by Lucas Penteado and Juan Paiva respectively. The film was nominated for numerous awards at home and abroad.

== Cast ==
- Antonio Pitanga
- Juan Paiva
- Lelle
- Lucas Penteado
- Nando Cunha
- Tatiana Tiburcio
