= Big Brother Brasil 21 =

Season of television show

- Season 21
- Hosted by: Tiago Leifert
- No. of days: 100
- No. of housemates: 20
- Winner: Juliette Freire
- Runner-up: Camilla de Lucas
- Companion shows: Rede BBB; A Eliminação; Plantão BBB
- No. of episodes: 100

Release
- Original network: Globo; Multishow
- Original release: January 25 – May 4, 2021

Season chronology
- ← Previous; Big Brother Brasil 20 Next → Big Brother Brasil 22

Big Brother Brasil 21 is the twenty-first season of Big Brother Brasil, which premiered on TV Globo on January 25, 2021. The show is produced by Endemol Shine and presented by Tiago Leifert. The new season was confirmed by Leifert and the show director, Boninho, on April 27, 2020, on the day of the live finale of Big Brother Brasil 20.

The grand prize is R$1.5 million with tax allowances, a R$150,000 prize is offered to the runner-up and a prize of R$50,000, to the third place. Just as the previous season, this season features 20 housemates divided into two groups: "Celebrities", composed of actors, singers, professional athletes and social media personalities, and "Civilians" composed of everyday Brazilians.

On May 4, 2021, lawyer & makeup artist Juliette Freire won the competition with 90.15% of the public vote over digital influencer Camilla de Lucas and actor & singer Fiuk. According to the Brazilian Institute of Public Opinion and Statistics, the first episode was watched by 43.7 million viewers, and in total 65 million tuned in during the first week.

== The game ==
=== #FeedBBB ===
The theme of the reality show is such that each housemate will use a cellphone to capture moments in the house during a time determined by the production. The cell phone only allows them to post photos and videos to #FeedBBB, and see what other housemates say about each other. It does not allow contact with the outside world.

1. FeedBBB introduced an app akin to Tinder called "Arrow" in season twenty-one, which housemates used to pick out their love interests in the house. The "HoH Podcast" is recorded weekly and published on the GShow website. The housemates can see when it is being recorded but do not hear the content.

=== Nomination Superpower ===
Starting on the day the cast list was unveiled, the public voted to grant three "Civilians" and three "Celebrities" immunity from the first eviction period. The six selected housemates lived in a House Next Door and joined the Main House on Day 2. Then, one housemate was nominated for eviction.

Top 3 Results
No.	Celebrity	Civilian
1	Fiuk; 15.57% to benefit	Lumena; 18.42% to benefit
2	Viih; 12.61% to benefit	Juliette; 13.96% to benefit
3	Projota; 11.98% to benefit	Arthur; 13.42% to benefit

=== Fake Eviction ===
On week 6, it was announced that there would be a fake eviction. The winner of the Head of Household competition during week 6 would be given immunity during the following week. All final nominees guarantee their spot in the next competition. Instead of voting to evict, the audience would be voting to give powers to two housemates, the most voted and the least voted.

==== Secret Room & Power of Immunity Veto ====
The most voted housemate is moved to a secret room and given a Power of Immunity Veto. This gives them the power to cancel the decision of the Power of Immunity Holder. This power is valid for two weeks and may only be used once.

==== Double Vote ====
The least-voted housemate is given a Double Vote. This means that, in the Diary Room, their one vote is counted as two votes. This power is valid for two weeks and may only be used once.

=== Super HoH ===
Along with its regular powers, the HoH would also be tasked with splitting their housemates into Haves and Have-Nots as well as choosing what and how much each group would be eating.

=== Power of Veto ===
In some weeks, the nominated housemates compete against each other for one last chance to save themselves from eviction. The housemates nominated by the HoH are not eligible to compete and are guaranteed to face Brazil's vote.

=== Power of No ===
At the beginning of each week, the previous Head of Household may or may not be given the opportunity to disqualify some housemates from competing in the upcoming HoH competition.

Week	Previous HoH(s)	Total	Vetoed housemates
2	Nego Di	1	Lucas
3	Arthur	2	Gilberto, Fiuk
4	Karol	1	Juliette
5	Sarah	1	Pocah
7	Medical Recommendation	1	Caio
7	Rodolffo	1	Pocah
8	Fiuk	1	Arthur

=== Big Phone ===
Once in a while, the Big Phone rings, unleashing good or bad consequences on the nomination process for those who decide to answer it.

Week	Housemate	Date	Time (UTC−03:00)	Consequences
1	João Luiz	January 30, 2021	Saturday; 5:52 p.m.	See note 3
1	Arcrebiano	January 30, 2021	Saturday; 6:24 p.m.	See note 3
1	Arcrebiano	January 30, 2021	Saturday; 6:45 p.m.	See note 3
2	Arcrebiano	February 5, 2021	Friday; 11:16 p.m.	See note 4
2	Gilberto	February 7, 2021	Sunday; 10:00 a.m.	See note 4
2	Thaís	February 7, 2021	Sunday; 6:00 p.m.	See note 4
5	Carla	February 27, 2021	Saturday; 11:14 p.m.	See note 9
9	Gilberto	March 27, 2021	Saturday; 11:03 p.m.	See note 17

=== The Counterattack ===
The counterattack is a surprise power given to either the HoH's nominee and/or the House's nominee in which they have the opportunity to automatically nominate an additional housemate for eviction. While viewers are informed when the power will be featured in advance (on Thursdays before the Head of Household competition even takes place), the housemates are only informed about the twist on the spot, during Sunday's live nominations.

Week		Housemate	Status	Used on:	Result
3		Sarah	HoH's nominee	Nego Di	See note 5
6		Carla	HoH's Have-Not nominee	Caio	See note 12
6		João Luiz	HoH's Have nominee	Pocah	See note 12
9		Juliette	HoH's nominee	Rodolffo	See note 18
9		Sarah	House's nominee	Thaís	See note 18
10		Caio	House's Face-to-Face nominee	Juliette	See note 21
12	Day 88	Viih	House's nominee	Fiuk	See note 30
12	Day 91	Camilla	HoH's nominee	Pocah	See note 31

== Housemates ==
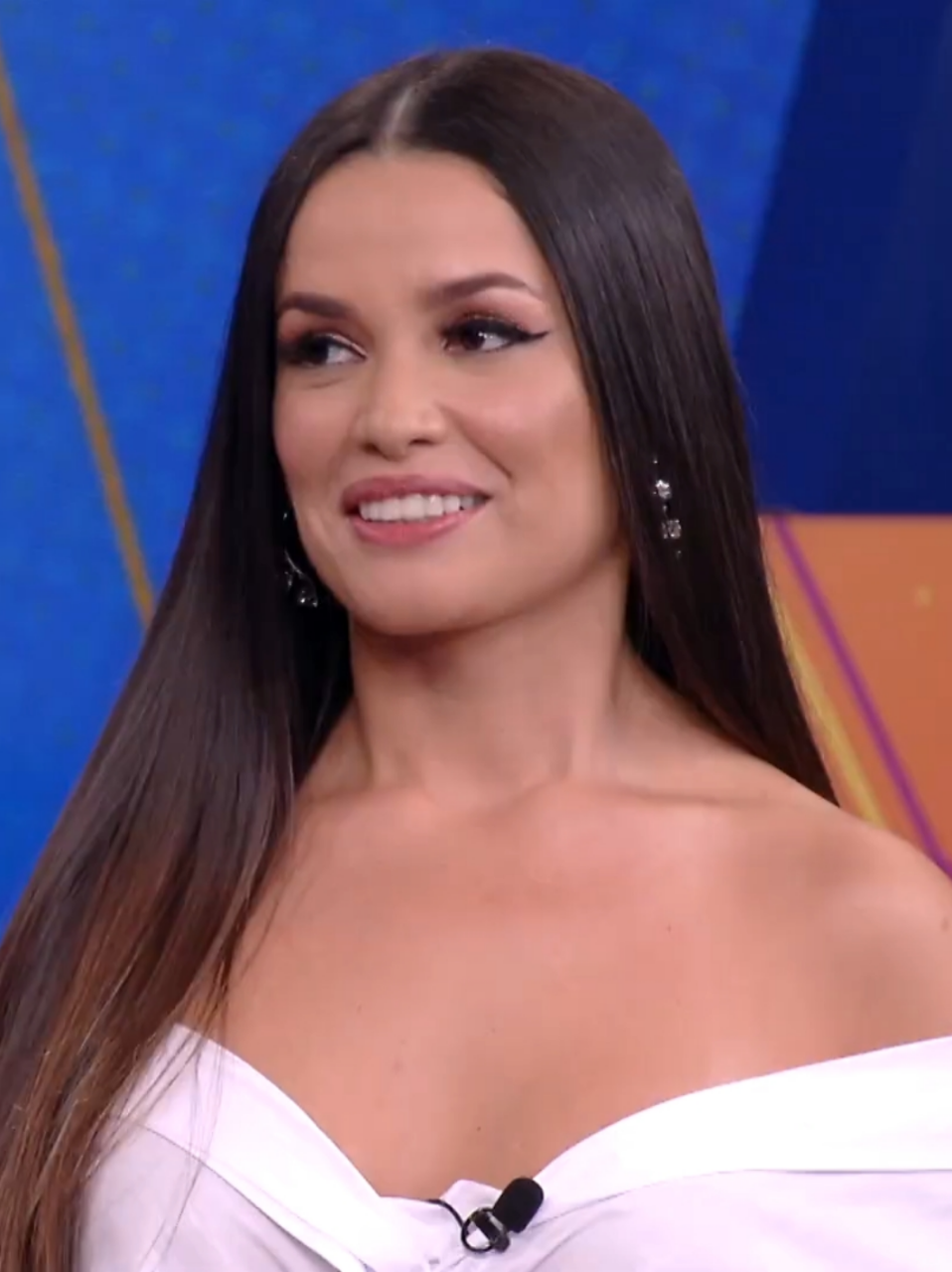
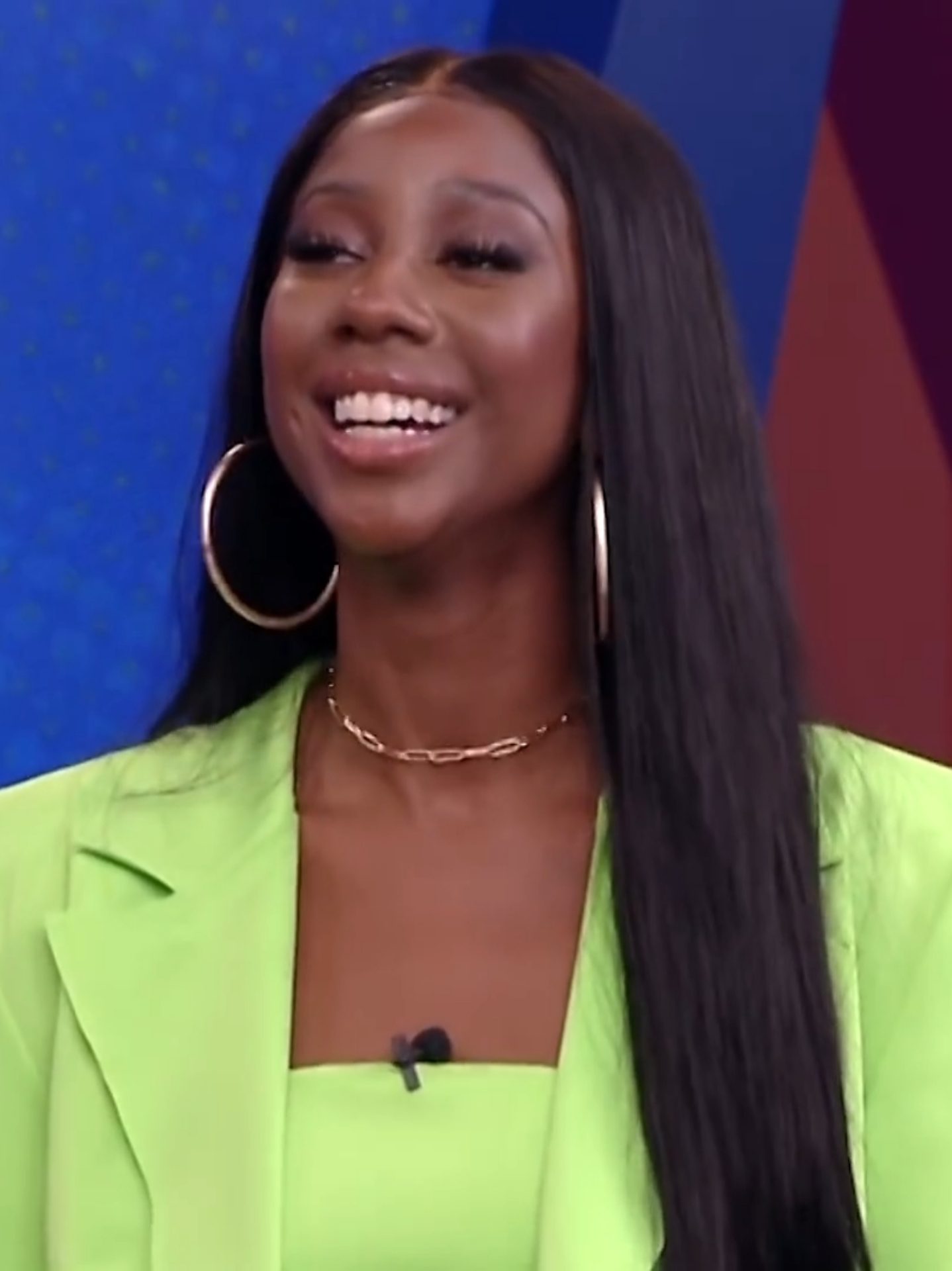
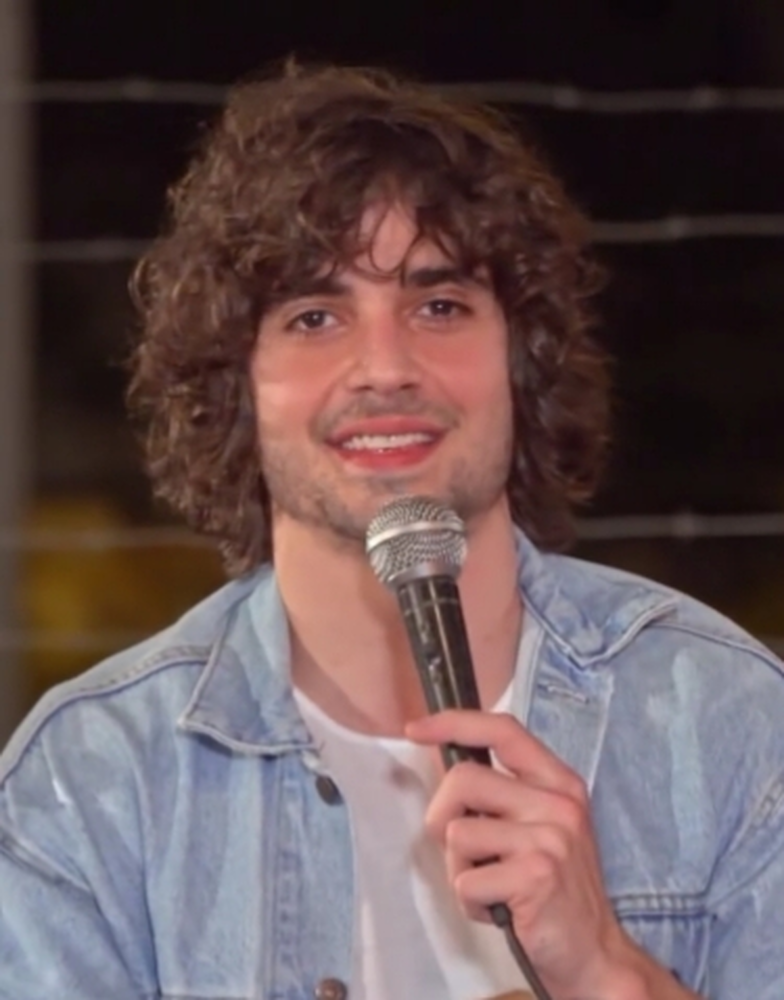
Juliette Freire (Winner), Camilla de Lucas (Runner-up) and Fiuk (Third place), the finalists of Big Brother Brasil 21.

The cast list was unveiled on January 19, 2021.

Name	Age	Type	Hometown	Occupation	Day entered	Day exited	Result
Juliette Freire	31	Civilian	Campina Grande	Lawyer & makeup artist	1	100	Winner
Camilla de Lucas	26	Celebrity	Nova Iguaçu	Digital influencer	1	100	Runner-up
Fiuk	30	Celebrity	São Paulo	Actor & singer	1	100	Third place
Gilberto Nogueira	29	Civilian	Jaboatão dos Guararapes	Doctorate in Economy	1	98	16th Evicted
Pocah	26	Celebrity	Queimados	Singer	1	95	15th Evicted
Arthur Picoli	26	Civilian	Conduru	Crossfit instructor	1	93	14th Evicted
Viih Tube	20	Celebrity	Sorocaba	Actress & YouTuber	1	91	13th Evicted
João Luiz Pedrosa	24	Civilian	Santos Dumont	Geography teacher	1	88	12th Evicted
Caio Afiune	32	Civilian	Anápolis	Farmer	1	86	11th Evicted
Thaís Braz	27	Civilian	Luziânia	Dentist surgeon	1	79	10th Evicted
Rodolffo Matthaus	32	Celebrity	Uruaçu	Singer	1	72	9th Evicted
Sarah Andrade	29	Civilian	Brasília	Digital marketing consultant	1	65	8th Evicted
Carla Diaz	30	Celebrity	São Paulo	Actress	1	58	7th Evicted
Projota	34	Celebrity	São Paulo	Singer & rapper	1	51	6th Evicted
Lumena Aleluia	29	Civilian	Salvador	Psychologist & DJ	1	37	5th Evicted
Karol Conká	35	Celebrity	Curitiba	Singer & TV presenter	1	30	4th Evicted
Nego Di	26	Celebrity	Porto Alegre	Comedian	1	23	3rd Evicted
Arcrebiano Araújo	29	Civilian	Vila Velha	Model	1	16	2nd Evicted
Lucas Penteado	24	Celebrity	São Paulo	Actor	1	14	Walked
Kerline Cardoso	28	Civilian	Fortaleza	Model & digital influencer	1	9	1st Evicted

== Future appearances ==
After this 2021 season, Arcrebiano Araújo appeared in No Limite 5, where he finished in 12th place in the competition. In the same year, Arcrebiano also appeared in A Fazenda 13, where he finished as runner-up from the competition.

In 2022, Gilberto Nogueira appeared in Dança dos Famosos 19, where he finished in 8th place.

In 2022, Lumena Aleluia appeared on De Férias com o Ex Caribe: Salseiro VIP as original cast member. In 2023, Lumena also appeared in A Fazenda 15, she entered in the Warehouse where the public voted for four contestants to move into the main house, she didn't receive enough votes to enter in the game. In 2024, appeared in De Férias com o Ex Directoria as a member of the original cast, and was announced as the winner of the season; in 2026 she returned for the second season.

In 2022, Kerline Cardoso appeared in A Fazenda 14, she finished in 9th place in the competition.

In 2026, Sarah Andrade returned in Big Brother Brasil 26, she finished in 19th place in the competition.

== Voting history ==
Key
– Civilians
– Celebrities

	Week 1	Week 2	Week 3	Week 4	Week 5	Week 6	Week 7	Week 8	Week 9	Week 10		Week 11	Week 12	Week 13			Week 14		
	Week 1	Week 2	Week 3	Week 4	Week 5	Week 6	Week 7	Week 8	Week 9	Diary Room	Face-to-Face	Week 11	Week 12	Day 86	Day 88	Day 91	Day 93	Day 96	Finale
Head of Household	Nego Di	Arthur	Karol	Sarah	João Luiz	Rodolffo	Fiuk	Gilberto	Arthur	Viih		Caio	Viih	Gilberto	Pocah	Gilberto	Juliette	(none)	(none)
Power of Immunity	Rodolffo	Carla	Caio	Caio	Caio	Arthur	Projota	Viih	Thaís	Fiuk; Gilberto		João Luiz	Camilla	(none)	(none)			(none)	(none)
Saved	Caio	Camilla	Rodolffo	Rodolffo	Caio	Projota	Arthur	Thaís	Viih	João Luiz		Camilla	Camilla	(none)	(none)			(none)	(none)
Nomination (Twists)	Rodolffo; Sarah	Juliette; Karol	Nego Di	Arthur	Lumena; Rodolffo	Caio; Pocah	(none)	Carla; Fiuk	Rodolffo; Thaís	Juliette		Fiuk	(none)	(none)	Fiuk	Pocah	Camilla; Gilberto	Camilla; Gilberto; Juliette	(none)
Nomination (HoH)	Kerline	Gilberto	Sarah	Karol	Projota	Carla; João Luiz	Projota	Rodolffo	Juliette	Gilberto		Thaís	Fiuk; Gilberto	Pocah	Gilberto	Camilla	Pocah	(none)	(none)
Nomination (Housemates)	Arcrebiano	Arcrebiano	Fiuk	Gilberto; Projota	Arthur	Arthur	Gilberto; Pocah; Thaís	Caio	Sarah	Rodolffo	Caio	Arthur; Pocah	Arthur; Caio	Arthur; João Luiz	Viih	Arthur	(none)	(none)	(none)
Veto Players	Arcrebiano; Rodolffo; Sarah	Arcrebiano; Juliette; Karol	(none)	Arthur; Gilberto; Projota	Arthur; Lumena; Rodolffo	Arthur; Caio; Pocah	Gilberto; Pocah; Thaís	Caio; Carla; Fiuk	Rodolffo; Sarah; Thaís	Caio; Juliette; Rodolffo		Arthur; Fiuk; Pocah	Arthur; Caio	(none)			(none)	(none)	(none)
Veto Winner(s)	Arcrebiano	Karol	(none)	Projota	Rodolffo	Pocah	Gilberto	Caio	Thaís	Juliette		Pocah	Arthur	(none)			(none)	(none)	(none)
Juliette	Thaís	Nego Di	Lumena	Lumena	Arthur	Arthur	Pocah	Arthur	Sarah	Rodolffo	Caio	Arthur	Arthur; Caio	Arthur	Arthur	Arthur	Head of Household	Nominated	Winner (Day 100)
Camilla	Arcrebiano	Arcrebiano	Caio	Projota	Arthur	Caio	Caio	Caio	Rodolffo	Rodolffo	Caio	Pocah	Arthur; Caio	Arthur	Arthur	Arthur	Nominated	Nominated	Runner-up (Day 100)
Fiuk	Carla	Arcrebiano	Arthur	Carla	Arthur	Arthur	Head of Household	Arthur	Pocah	Arthur	Arthur	Arthur	Pocah; Caio	Viih	Viih	Arthur	Exempt	Exempt	Third place (Day 100)
Gilberto	Arcrebiano	Lumena	Arthur	Projota	Pocah	Pocah	Pocah	Caio	Rodolffo	Rodolffo	Pocah	Pocah	Pocah; Arthur	Head of Household	Viih	Head of Household	Nominated	Nominated	Evicted (Day 98)
Pocah	Arcrebiano	Arcrebiano	Gilberto	Gilberto	Sarah	Fiuk	Gilberto	Juliette	Sarah	Juliette	Juliette	Gilberto	João Luiz; Juliette	João Luiz	Head of Household	Fiuk	Nominated	Evicted (Day 95)	
Arthur	Camilla	Head of Household	Fiuk	Gilberto	Thaís	Juliette	Thaís ^{(x2)}	Viih	Head of Household	Juliette	Juliette	Gilberto	Juliette; João Luiz	João Luiz	Viih	Juliette	Evicted (Day 93)		
Viih	Arcrebiano	Lumena	Fiuk	Projota	Arthur	Pocah	Gilberto	Caio	Sarah	Rodolffo	Caio	Arthur	Caio	Arthur	Fiuk	Evicted (Day 91)			
João Luiz	Arcrebiano	Arcrebiano	Projota	Projota	Head of Household	Arthur	Pocah	Arthur	Rodolffo	Rodolffo	Caio	Pocah	Arthur; Pocah	Arthur	Evicted (Day 88)				
Caio	Camilla	Fiuk	Fiuk	Camilla	Camilla	Camilla	Thaís	Juliette	Sarah	Juliette	Juliette	Head of Household	João Luiz; Juliette	Evicted (Day 86)					
Thaís	Arcrebiano	Arcrebiano	Projota	Projota	Arthur	Arthur	Gilberto	Caio	Rodolffo	Caio	Caio	Arthur	Evicted (Day 79)						
Rodolffo	João Luiz	Fiuk	Fiuk	João Luiz	Carla	Head of Household	Thaís	Juliette	Sarah	Juliette	Juliette	Evicted (Day 72)							
Sarah	João Luiz	Lumena	Fiuk	Head of Household	Pocah	Pocah	Pocah	Juliette	Pocah	Evicted (Day 65)									
Carla	Arcrebiano	Arcrebiano	Lumena	Lumena	Gilberto	Caio	Gilberto	Caio	Evicted (Day 58)										
Projota	Thaís	Arcrebiano	Thaís	Gilberto	Thaís	Thaís	Thaís	Evicted (Day 51)											
Lumena	Thaís	Arcrebiano	Juliette	Carla	Arthur	Evicted (Day 37)													
Karol	Carla	Arcrebiano	Head of Household	Gilberto	Evicted (Day 30)														
Nego Di	Head of Household	Carla	Juliette	Evicted (Day 23)															
Arcrebiano	Camilla	Lumena	Evicted (Day 16)																
Lucas	Carla	Walked (Day 14)																	
Kerline	Arcrebiano	Evicted (Day 9)																	
Notes	1, 2, 3	4	5, 6	7, 8	9, 10	11, 12	11, 13, 14	15, 16, 17	18, 19, 20	21, 22, 23, 24		8, 25	10, 26, 27, 28, 29	8	30	20, 31	32	33	34
Nominated for Eviction	Kerline; Rodolffo; Sarah	Arcrebiano; Gilberto; Juliette	Fiuk; Nego Di; Sarah	Arthur; Gilberto; Karol	Arthur; Lumena; Projota	Arthur; Caio; Carla; João Luiz	Pocah; Projota; Thaís	Carla; Fiuk; Rodolffo	Juliette; Rodolffo; Sarah	Caio; Gilberto; Rodolffo		Arthur; Fiuk; Thaís	Caio; Fiuk; Gilberto	Arthur; João Luiz; Pocah	Fiuk; Gilberto; Viih	Arthur; Camilla; Pocah	Camilla; Gilberto; Pocah	Camilla; Gilberto; Juliette	Camilla; Fiuk; Juliette
Walked	(none)	Lucas	(none)																
Evicted	Kerline; 83% to evict	Arcrebiano; 65% to evict	Nego Di; 98% to evict	Karol; 99% to evict	Lumena; 61% to evict	Carla; 63% to move	Projota; 92% to evict	Carla; 44.96% to evict	Sarah; 77% to evict	Rodolffo; 51% to evict		Thaís; 82% to evict	Caio; 70% to evict	João Luiz; 59% to evict	Viih; 97% to evict	Arthur; 61% to evict	Pocah; 73% to evict	Gilberto; 51% to evict	Fiuk; 4.62% to win
Evicted	Kerline; 83% to evict	Arcrebiano; 65% to evict	Nego Di; 98% to evict	Karol; 99% to evict	Lumena; 61% to evict	Carla; 63% to move	Projota; 92% to evict	Carla; 44.96% to evict	Sarah; 77% to evict	Rodolffo; 51% to evict		Thaís; 82% to evict	Caio; 70% to evict	João Luiz; 59% to evict	Viih; 97% to evict	Arthur; 61% to evict	Pocah; 73% to evict	Gilberto; 51% to evict	Camilla; 5.23% to win
Survived	Sarah; 9% to evict	Juliette; 33% to evict	Fiuk; 1% to evict	Arthur; 0.54% to evict	Projota; 37% to evict	João Luiz; 28% to move	Thaís; 7% to evict	Rodolffo; 44.45% to evict	Rodolffo; 22% to evict	Caio; 44% to evict		Arthur; 16% to evict	Fiuk; 28% to evict	Pocah; 28% to evict	Fiuk; 2% to evict	Camilla; 31% to evict	Gilberto; 15% to evict	Camilla; 48% to evict	Juliette; 90% to win
Survived	Sarah; 9% to evict	Juliette; 33% to evict	Fiuk; 1% to evict	Arthur; 0.54% to evict	Projota; 37% to evict	Caio; 8% to move	Thaís; 7% to evict	Rodolffo; 44.45% to evict	Rodolffo; 22% to evict	Caio; 44% to evict		Arthur; 16% to evict	Fiuk; 28% to evict	Pocah; 28% to evict	Fiuk; 2% to evict	Camilla; 31% to evict	Gilberto; 15% to evict	Camilla; 48% to evict	Juliette; 90% to win
Survived	Rodolffo; 8% to evict	Gilberto; 2% to evict	Sarah; 1% to evict	Gilberto; 0.29% to evict	Arthur; 1% to evict	Caio; 8% to move	Pocah; 1% to evict	Fiuk; 11% to evict	Juliette; 1% to evict	Gilberto; 5% to evict		Fiuk; 2% to evict	Gilberto; 2% to evict	Arthur; 13% to evict	Gilberto; 1% to evict	Pocah; 8% to evict	Camilla; 12% to evict	Juliette; 1% to evict	Juliette; 90% to win
Survived	Rodolffo; 8% to evict	Gilberto; 2% to evict	Sarah; 1% to evict	Gilberto; 0.29% to evict	Arthur; 1% to evict	Arthur; 1% to move	Pocah; 1% to evict	Fiuk; 11% to evict	Juliette; 1% to evict	Gilberto; 5% to evict		Fiuk; 2% to evict	Gilberto; 2% to evict	Arthur; 13% to evict	Gilberto; 1% to evict	Pocah; 8% to evict	Camilla; 12% to evict	Juliette; 1% to evict	Juliette; 90% to win
Votes	29,227,926	105,169,555	169,038,642	285,230,781	97,050,122	62,655,999	89,412,933	535,713,590	654,386,216	416,934,323		106,557,323	62,170,447	86,040,087	107,654,900	414,924,814	59,703,676	514,371,762	633,284,707

=== Notes ===
- ^Note 1: As part of the Nomination Superpower twist, Arthur, Fiuk, Juliette, Lumena, Projota and Viih received immunity for the first nomination through the public vote on Day 1. However, they also had to choose, as a group, one housemate to nominate for eviction on Day 7. They nominated Rodolffo.
- ^Note 2: On Day 1, 14 housemates that were not part of the Superpower group competed in a pairs endurance competition. Lucas & Nego Di won and participated in a draw, which resulted in Nego Di winning a reward of a PlayStation 5 and Lucas winning immunity for the first nomination.
- ^Note 3: On Day 6, João Luiz answered the Big Phone and was told to immediately nominate three housemates for eviction; he chose Arcrebiano, Rodolffo and Sarah. A few minutes later, Arcrebiano answered the second Big Phone call and was told to save one of João Luiz's three choices; he saved himself. Not long after, the Big Phone rang once again, and Arcrebiano again answered. Arcrebiano was told to save one of the two remaining nominees, Rodolffo or Sarah. He saved Rodolffo, leaving Sarah as a nominee for the first eviction.
- ^Note 4: On Day 12, Arcrebiano answered the Big Phone and was tasked with potentially giving immunity to one housemate and endangering another for eviction. He saved Juliette and nominated Thaís. On Day 14, Gilberto answered the Big Phone and was given the same task; he saved Sarah and nominated Karol. Later that day, Thaís answered the third call of the Big Phone, and was tasked to pick one of the two saved housemates to nominate for eviction, and pick one of the two nominees to save. She saved herself and nominated Juliette.
- ^Note 5: This week, the HoH's nominee had the power to name an additional nominee. During the nominations, Karol, as HoH, nominated Sarah, who in turn nominated Nego Di.
- ^Note 6: No Power of Veto competition was held this week.
- ^Note 7: This week, Caio, Fiuk and Gilberto, who were finalists in the HoH competition (except for the winner), won the power to choose, as a trio, one housemate to nominate for eviction on Day 25. They nominated Arthur.
- ^Note 8: This week, the top 2 vote recipients became the House's Nominees.
- ^Note 9: On Day 34, Carla answered the Big Phone and was told to immediately nominate three housemates for eviction. She chose Fiuk, Lumena and Rodolffo. Later, the HoH's nominee had to save one of these three nominees. Projota saved Fiuk.
- ^Note 10: This week, the Power of Immunity winner won immunity for themselves, rather than having been forced to give immunity.
- ^Note 11: Week 6 was a fake eviction week. As the HoH during a Fake Eviction week, Rodolffo received immunity for the following week.
- ^Note 12: The HoH had to nominate two housemates (a Have-Not and a Have). Both of these nominees had the power to name an additional nominee. During the nominations, Rodolffo, as HoH, nominated Carla, who in turn nominated Caio, and João Luiz, who in turn nominated Pocah.
- ^Note 13: This week, the top 3 vote recipients became the House's Nominees.
- ^Note 14: On the week following the fake eviction, housemates nominated for fake eviction could not be disqualified from competing in the next HoH competition. Also, the vote in Diary Room of the least voted housemate to move, Arthur, would count as two.
- ^Note 15: This week, the first duo eliminated in the HoH endurance competition were nominated for eviction. Carla & Fiuk were the first to leave and were automatically nominated for eviction.
- ^Note 16: As one of the duo winners of the HoH endurance competition, Sarah won immunity for this week.
- ^Note 17: As Head of Household, Gilberto was forced to break the tie between Caio and Juliette (with four votes each). He nominated Caio.
- ^Note 18: On Day 62, Gilberto answered the Big Phone and chose Sarah to wear a white wristband. On Sunday, it was announced that the chosen one would be the first one to vote on a face to face live nomination, and could choose the next one to go.
- ^Note 19: This week, both the HoH's and the House’s nominee had the power to name an additional nominee. During the nominations, Arthur, as HoH, nominated Juliette, who in turn nominated Rodolffo. The Housemates nominated Sarah, who in turn nominated Thaís.
- ^Note 20: This week, the Housemates voted in Face-to-Face nominations.
- ^Note 21: This week, the Housemates had two rounds of voting that would determine two House Nominees. The first round of voting was a normal vote (with votes cast privately in the Diary Room), while the second was a face to face vote. The Housemate with the most votes in each round of voting was nominated.
- ^Note 22: As Head of Household, Viih was forced to break the tie between Juliette and Rodolffo (with four votes each) to determine the House's first nominee. She nominated Rodolffo.
- ^Note 23: As Head of Household, Viih was forced to break the tie between Caio and Juliette (with four votes each) to determine the House's second nominee. She nominated Caio.
- ^Note 24: This week, the House’s second nominee (nominated from face-to-face voting) had the power to name an additional nominee. During the nominations, the Housemates nominated Caio, who in turn nominated Juliette.
- ^Note 25: This week, the HoH competition featured an "Evil Finale", after which Fiuk, as the loser, was automatically nominated for eviction.
- ^Note 26: The HoH had to nominate two housemates. Between them, one had to be on the Monster Punishment.
- ^Note 27: This week features the last Power of Immunity competition of this season.
- ^Note 28: This week, the housemates had to vote for two different housemates during nominations. Two Housemates would then be nominated from this vote.
- ^Note 29: As Head of Household, Viih was forced to break the tie between Caio, João Luiz, Juliette and Pocah (with three votes each) to determine the House's second nominee. She nominated Caio.
- ^Note 30: On Day 88, the House's nominee had the power to name an additional nominee. During the nominations, the Housemates nominated Viih, who in turn nominated Fiuk.
- ^Note 31: On Day 91, the HoH's nominee had the power to name an additional nominee. During the nominations, Gilberto, as HoH, nominated Camilla, who in turn nominated Pocah.
- ^Note 32: On Day 93, the HoH's nominee had the power to save one of the housemates. During the nominations, Juliette, as HoH, nominated Pocah, who in turn saved Fiuk, automatically nominating Camilla and Gilberto for eviction with her.
- ^Note 33: Fiuk won the final competition, winning immunity from the final eviction and granting him a place in the Finale. Camilla, Gilberto and Juliette were automatically nominated for eviction by default to compete for the last two finale spots.
- ^Note 34: For the final, the public will vote for the housemate they want to win Big Brother Brasil 21.

=== Have and Have-Nots ===
	Week 1	Week 2	Week 3	Week 4	Week 5	Week 6^{1}	Week 7^{2}	Week 8^{3}	Week 9	Week 10	Week 11^{4}	Week 12^{5}	Week 13			Week 14	
	Week 1	Week 2	Week 3	Week 4	Week 5	Week 6^{1}	Week 7^{2}	Week 8^{3}	Week 9	Week 10	Week 11^{4}	Week 12^{5}	Day 86	Day 88	Day 91	Day 93	Day 95
Juliette	Have-Not	Have-Not	Have-Not	Have	Have-Not	Have-Not	Have-Not	Have	Have-Not	Have	Have-Not	Have	Have	Have-Not	Have-Not	Have	Have
Camilla	Have	Have-Not	Have-Not	Have-Not	Have	Have-Not	Have	Have-Not	Have-Not	Have	Have-Not	Have	Have-Not	Have-Not	Have-Not	Have	Have
Fiuk	Have-Not	Have-Not	Have-Not	Have	Have-Not	Have-Not	Have	Have	Have	Have-Not	Have-Not	Have-Not	Have	Have-Not	Have	Have-Not	Have
Gilberto	Have	Have-Not	Have-Not	Have	Have-Not	Have	Have	Have	Have-Not	Have-Not	Have	Have-Not	Have	Have-Not	Have	Have	Have
Pocah	Have	Have-Not	Have	Have-Not	Have-Not	Have-Not	Have-Not	Have	Have	Have-Not	Have-Not	Have	Have-Not	Have	Have-Not	Have-Not	
Arthur	Have-Not	Have	Have	Have-Not	Have-Not	Have-Not	Have-Not	Have-Not	Have	Have-Not	Have-Not	Have-Not	Have-Not	Have	Have		
Viih	Have	Have	Have-Not	Have-Not	Have	Have	Have-Not	Have-Not	Have-Not	Have	Have-Not	Have	Have-Not	Have			
João Luiz	Have	Have-Not	Have-Not	Have-Not	Have	Have	Have-Not	Have-Not	Have-Not	Have	Have	Have	Have				
Caio	Have-Not	Have	Have-Not	Have	Have-Not	Have	Have	Have-Not	Have	Have-Not	Have	Have-Not					
Thaís	Have-Not	Have-Not	Have-Not	Have-Not	Have	Have-Not	Have-Not	Have-Not	Have-Not	Have	Have-Not						
Rodolffo	Have-Not	Have-Not	Have-Not	Have	Have-Not	Have	Have	Have-Not	Have	Have-Not							
Sarah	Have-Not	Have-Not	Have-Not	Have	Have	Have	Have-Not	Have	Have-Not								
Carla	Have-Not	Have	Have	Have-Not	Have	Have-Not	Have-Not	Have-Not									
Projota	Have	Have	Have	Have-Not	Have-Not	Have-Not	Have-Not										
Lumena	Have	Have	Have	Have-Not	Have												
Karol	Have	Have	Have	Have-Not													
Nego Di	Have	Have	Have														
Arcrebiano	Have-Not	Have															
Lucas	Have	Have-Not															
Kerline	Have-Not																

- ^Note 1: On week 6, Juliette became a have-not after Arthur picked her for the Monster Punishment along with Fiuk, who was already a have-not.
- ^Note 2: On week 7, Sarah became a have-not after Projota picked her for the Monster Punishment along with João Luiz, who was already a have-not.
- ^Note 3: On week 8, Rodolffo became a have-not after Viih picked him for the Monster Punishment along with Arthur, who was already a have-not.
- ^Note 4: On week 11, Arthur became a have-not after João Luiz picked him for the Monster Punishment along with Pocah, who was already a have-not.
- ^Note 5: On week 12, Arthur became a have-not after Camilla picked him for the Monster Punishment along with Caio and Gilberto, who were already have-nots.

== Controversies ==
=== Karol Conká ===
Karol's behavior and actions towards other housemates garnered a very negative reception from the viewers and public personalities. This included Karol's encouragement of outcasting certain housemates, aggressive comments that sparked discussions regarding psychological abuse and prejudiced comments that ranged from gaslighting, xenophobia, religious intolerance and sexual harassment.

==== Accusation of xenophobia ====
A comment made by Karol Conká on January 29 displeased viewers, especially from Brazil's Northeast region. She talked about the behavior of housemate Juliette Freire, who's from Campina Grande, Paraíba. "[They] said that in her land is normal to talk like that. I'm from Curitiba, it's a more reserved city", began Karol in conversation with Thaís Braz and Sarah Andrade, inside a bedroom.

Juliette's mannerisms, such as the way she expresses herself, talking more loudly and affectionately touching people speaking, were criticized by Karol: "although I'm an artist and run the world, I have my manners when I talk to people. I have a fun personality, but I don't invade people's space and touch them while I'm speaking. I find that weird", highlighted. The subject became a Trending Topic on Twitter.

==== Accusation of religious intolerance ====
Karol was criticized during an argument with housemate Lucas Penteado. Lucas had said that his best friend was God, which garnered the following response from Karol on February 1: "oh, only yours? And where was your best friend during your moments of madness?".

==== Accusation of psychological violence ====
During lunchtime on February 1, once more, Karol Conká involved herself in another polemic with Lucas Penteado, as she was rude to Lucas when he arrived at the kitchen for lunch. Karol had said to Lumena and Pocah that she would throw water on Lucas' face if he opened the mouth to speak, after Lucas has turned his back to the table. Lucas tried to sit to eat but was told to remove himself from the table, under the pretense that Karol refused to have lunch in his presence. Seeing that her words were directed to him, Lucas stood up and asked to be told when she had finished eating. "That's better, if you don't know how to shut up, it's better for you to leave", said Karol. Lucas apologized and Karol didn't mince words: "I don't forgive you, fuck you. Fuck you, go act like crazy outside the house, give up, I'm done." Lucas headed to the bedroom and Karol proceeded to speak very negatively of him in the kitchen. "I have no patience for people who act like crazy. If he's crazy, he shouldn't be here. If he's playing, making fun out of me, I'll act like crazy too, come on, you are only gonna eat when I leave the table, end of story. I don't care, nominate me for eviction if you want. I have my life and my very pretty career outside, got it?"

Karol's attitudes towards Lucas coupled with her already very negative reception due to her mistreating of Juliette in the first week, sparked bad repercussions in the social networks and viewers launched the tag #KarolConkaExpelled (#KarolConkaExpulsa), rejecting her actions. Artists such as former Big Brother housemate Babu Santana, actress Tatá Werneck and soccer player Neymar also rejected Karol's action and spoke in favor of Lucas. A group of viewers led by influencer Thomas Santana reunited in fort of Estúdios Globo, where the Big Brother house is located, and made a "panelaço" asking for Karol's ejection.

Due to Karol's polemics, on February 2, the GNT channel indefinitely suspended the release of Prazer Feminino, a TV show which would have been released on February 22 and would also have the presence of former Big Brother housemate Marcela McGowan. On the same day, the organizers of Rec-Beat, the largest music festival of Pernambuco, decided to cancel the singer's presence from the invited attractions.

=== Accusations of harassment ===
==== Karol Conká ====
On February 3, Karol Conká was involved in another controversy, when she laid down with Arcrebiano in the backyard area of the house and was insistent on engaging in a relationship with him. Many viewers viewed the singer's attitude as harassment, as Karol was visually bothered despite deciding not to say anything. Arcrebiano's family released a note on his social media profiles, voicing their distaste for her invasive behavior and that they would be looking forward for Karol to distance herself from him.

==== Nego Di ====
During a conversation after the Head of Household competition in the first hours of February 5, Nego Di had said that he preferred to not sleep next to Carla Diaz in the bedroom to not have to take away "the flute from the case", referring to his genitals, before proceeding to make masturbation moves. After his speech, singer Projota and Arthur Picoli (who laughed at his comment) voiced their distaste for the comment. Nego Di's words were widely criticized in social networks, in which the comedian had already suffered backlash from distasteful jokes regarding sexual assault.

=== Polemics with student groups ===
During a conversation during late February 3 in the "Haves" kitchen, Lucas had tried to make peace with Nego Di following a series of arguments between them in the past few days. The comedian refused the actor's apologies and confirmed he would veto him in the next Head of Household competition. After that, he called Lucas a bad person, and, by the end of the discussion, said: "Wow, bro, for God's sake. This revolution you make, defending hobos."

After using the term "hobo" ("vagabundo" in Portuguese), Nego Di would be referring to secondary students who occupied school in 2015, during a protest against the state government of São Paulo due to budget cuts in education, at the time headed by Governor Geraldo Alckmin, of which Lucas was one of the leaders of the movement. Nego Di's speech sparked a lot of backlash, causing the release of a note from student movements and organizations, such as the Brazilian Union of Secondarist Students (Ubes) and the National Union of Students (UNE).

=== Colorism ===
In the late hours of February 5, during a conversation in the colored bedroom, Nego Di, Karol Conká and Lumena Aleluia were mocking Gilberto Nogueira's skin color, questioning the veracity of his self-declaration as a black person, using pejorative terms against him, such as saying that he was "not black, only someone who needed a good scrub" and that his appearance was akin to a Neanderthal. At the beginning of the daily edition of the program, presenter Tiago Leifert gave a short comment about the polemic, besides saying that the show also sparks discussions about relevant subjects for the society, before airing the conversation between Nego Di, Karol and Lumena, which did not include more xenophobic remarks that were made against Gilberto and fellow housemate Juliette Freire, who are both from the Northeastern region of Brazil. On the same day, the show's executive producer, Boninho, in an Instagram post, showed that the search for the term "colorism" had a growth of 100% in Google following the episode.

=== Stimulation of suffering ===
In an interview to newspaper Metrópoles, sociologist Silvia Viana, the author of the book Rituais de Sofrimento (Suffering Rituals), which analyzes the reality show's structure, said that Big Brother's production team was the main group responsible for the conflicts inside the house at the beginning of the show, based on the elements of the game.

If there's no fight, there's no reality show. The discussion are not only linked to feminism or racism, for example, the criteria change and they use people who are linked to subjects that are 'trending'. It's not manipulation, it's a marketing strategy [...] What matters the least is the criteria, the fight will happen. We're not seeing people being bad or perverse, what we see on screen is the same thing that happens on our side: a competition that aims a ghostly survival, that's what everyone does everyday. The show only stimulates that there's only one place for the winner and the people are induce to act how they act. [...] The show conquers the active engagement, frequently maniac, in this gear of making suffer.

— Silvia Viana

A group of psychologists of ANPSINEP (National Articulation of Black Psychologists) signed a note criticizing the show for letting Lucas suffer attacks, including from black housemates and that such a situation reinforces the "racist structure".

=== Lucas's withdrawal and external interferences ===
On the morning of February 7, actor Lucas Penteado decided to leave the show after being involved in many arguments with the majority of the housemates. His leaving was celebrated by most housemates, who were already on bad terms with him following an outcasting movement led by Projota and Karol Conká, despite his insistence on apologizing for his prior actions. Before leaving, Lucas kissed Gilberto (the first kiss between men in the TV show) and came out as bisexual, receiving many negative comments from other housemates, some of them from Lumena (a lesbian psychologist), Karol Conká and Pocah, who disapproved of his attitude and claimed he was pretending to be bisexual in order to use the LGBT movement as a platform to benefit himself in the game. The housemates involved in the controversy received accusations of psychological torture, besides rising polemics with their comments and attitudes in the house, from Karol and Pocah (both bisexuals).

Victim of biphobia after the kiss, Lucas received negative reception from the majority of the housemates, who questioned his sexuality. Following that, politicians and media personalities condemned the prejudiced act suffered by him, making the LGBTI+ National Alliance release a note against such attacks; the President of the Alliance, Toni Reis, said that "associate attorneys are preparing to file a lawsuit against the responsible for the attacks". Minutes after his departure, Projota decided to enter the Diary Room, and audio from his conversation with Boninho, the show's executive producer, was accidentally aired during the live feeds; in the conversation, Boninho had convinced the rapper to stay in the game (as he had also threatened to leave following Lucas' constant controversies in the house), by claiming that production was unaware of Lucas' issues with alcohol, affirming that he "turned into a monster", besides saying that the nerves would calm down without his presence. In the night of that same day, Rede Globo, in an official note to the press, confirmed that the voice that leaked during the talk with Projota was Boninho's due to an "operational failure", but highlighted that "[they] always cared for the health and security of all of the housemates" and that there's a team of medics and psychologists available who offer support to all housemates, if necessary. Highlighted, also, that the situation has been resolved after a conversation with the housemates during the morning.

=== Fraud in Veto competition ===
On February 8, in a conversation with housemates in the Head of Household bedroom, Karol Conká spoke of a supposed breach she had exploited in order to win the Veto competition, which are luck challenges; the competition consisted of the three players taking turns on opening hoses numbered from 1 to 21, with the winner being whoever decided to open the hose with the number 17, dousing the two other opponents. In the conversation, Karol said that she noticed some hoses were connected to the taps, and some were not, claiming to have paid attention to that and selecting the seventeenth hose after noticing that it looked different from the other ones. After the conversation, viewers accused Karol of cheating, as the players were explicitly told to stand above a marking on the ground from afar the hoses before deciding which one they would open; Karol had purposely asked to open the hose of number 20, which had been already selected by Arcrebiano seconds prior, in order to have an excuse to walk around the hoses and closely inspect them to find any possible irregularities that could lead her into picking the correct one.

Following the reveal, viewers started to ask for the cancellation of the challenge on social media networks, garnering support from many celebrities and former Big Brother housemates, by claiming that the network's allowance of Karol's exploit during the challenge was an attempt of further keeping her in the competition for ratings (albeit negative ones) by saving her from the block and almost certain eviction, following her constant negative behavior in the house that had long sparked criticism from both viewers and housemates. Arcrebiano's team published a note requesting a review of the competition by the show's production team, requesting a redo of the competition or for the nominations to be cancelled should the fraud be confirmed.

The show's production team informed that the challenge result would not be cancelled and that the nominations would still be valid. In a note addressing the viewers, TV Globo highlighted that the hoses were not real and that the water system was opened manually by the direction once the hose of number 17 was chosen, citing Karol's strategy and supposed exploit of the challenge as nothing more than luck.

== Ratings and reception ==
=== Brazilian ratings ===
All numbers are in points and provided by Kantar Ibope Media.

Week	First air date	Last air date	Timeslot (BRT)	Daily SP viewers (in points)							SP viewers (in points)	BR viewers (in points)	Ref.
Week	First air date	Last air date	Timeslot (BRT)	Mon	Tue	Wed	Thu	Fri	Sat	Sun	SP viewers (in points)	BR viewers (in points)	Ref.
1	January 25, 2021	January 31, 2021	Monday and Tuesday, Thursday to Sunday; 10:30 p.m. Wednesday; 11:45 p.m.	27.4	28.2	26.1^{1}	26.2	25.7	22.1	21.0	25.4	23.8	
2	February 1, 2021	February 7, 2021	Monday and Tuesday, Thursday to Sunday; 10:30 p.m. Wednesday; 11:45 p.m.	30.4	28.3	17.0	29.1	28.6	25.1	27.3	27.2	25.0	
3	February 8, 2021	February 14, 2021	Monday and Tuesday, Thursday to Sunday; 10:30 p.m. Wednesday; 11:45 p.m.	30.4	32.1	17.5	28.6	29.0	24.5	23.8	26.5	25.6	
4	February 15, 2021	February 21, 2021	Monday and Tuesday, Thursday to Sunday; 10:30 p.m. Wednesday; 11:45 p.m.	29.7	32.4	29.6^{1}	30.2	29.6	24.6	27.4	29.1	27.4	
5	February 22, 2021	February 28, 2021	Monday and Tuesday, Thursday to Sunday; 10:30 p.m. Wednesday; 11:45 p.m.	33.2	38.3	31.0^{1}	13.4^{2}	28.9	27.1	23.7	27.9	28.0	
6	March 1, 2021	March 7, 2021	Monday and Tuesday, Thursday to Sunday; 10:30 p.m. Wednesday; 11:45 p.m.	29.1	32.0	30.4^{1}	29.2	29.5	27.7	26.2	29.2	27.2	
7	March 8, 2021	March 14, 2021	Monday and Tuesday, Thursday to Sunday; 10:30 p.m. Wednesday; 11:45 p.m.	31.0	30.9	32.2^{1}	32.9	31.8	26.2	27.0	30.3	28.5	
8	March 15, 2021	March 21, 2021	Monday and Tuesday, Thursday to Sunday; 10:30 p.m. Wednesday; 11:45 p.m.	30.2	31.5	30.7^{1}	32.4	31.2	27.7	28.0	30.2	28.1	
9	March 22, 2021	March 28, 2021	Monday and Tuesday, Thursday to Sunday; 10:30 p.m. Wednesday; 11:45 p.m.	33.0	33.4	16.7	31.0	28.7	25.7	27.1	29.2	27.4	
10	March 29, 2021	April 4, 2021	Monday and Tuesday, Thursday to Sunday; 10:30 p.m. Wednesday; 11:45 p.m.	31.1	33.7	15.9	29.5	30.3	27.8	27.2	29.3	28.0	
11	April 5, 2021	April 11, 2021	Monday and Tuesday, Thursday to Sunday; 10:30 p.m. Wednesday; 11:45 p.m.	30.8	32.6	20.2	31.8	29.5	24.1	26.3	29.2	28.3	
12	April 12, 2021	April 18, 2021	Monday and Tuesday, Thursday to Sunday; 10:30 p.m. Wednesday; 11:45 p.m.	28.8	30.2	15.8	30.3	27.9	25.0	25.2	27.4	26.2	
13	April 19, 2021	April 25, 2021	Monday and Tuesday, Thursday to Sunday; 10:30 p.m. Wednesday; 11:45 p.m.	29.5	30.2	27.6	31.3	27.5	25.6	28.2	29.1	28.3	
14	April 26, 2021	May 2, 2021	Monday and Tuesday, Thursday to Sunday; 10:30 p.m. Wednesday; 11:45 p.m.	28.8	31.0	27.8	30.1	29.9	24.8	25.7	28.3	27.8	
15	May 3, 2021	May 4, 2021	Monday and Tuesday, Thursday to Sunday; 10:30 p.m. Wednesday; 11:45 p.m.	27.9	34.1	—	—	—	—	—	31.0	29.8	

- In 2021, each point represents 268.278 households in 15 market cities in Brazil (76.577 households in São Paulo).
- ^Note 1: This episode aired on a special time at 10:30 p.m.
- ^Note 2: This episode aired on a special time at 11:45 p.m.
