= Carla Madeira =

Brazilian writer (born 1964)

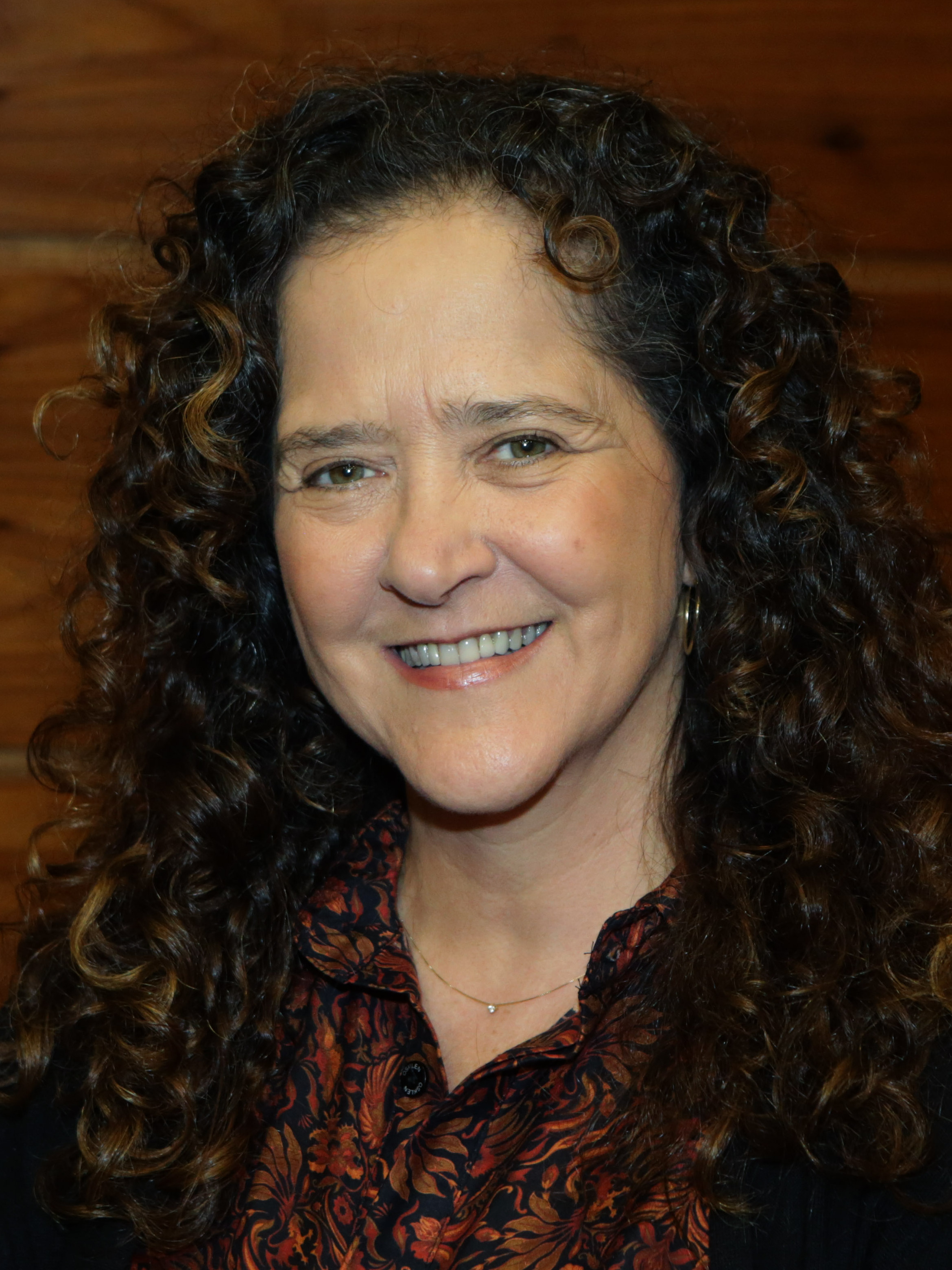
- Born: 18 October 1964; Belo Horizonte
- Alma mater: Federal University of Minas Gerais

Carla Madeira (born 18 October 1964 ) is a Brazilian writer, known by her works Tudo é Rio (It's All River), A Natureza da Mordida and Véspera. Carla Madeira is also a journalist and publicist.

== Life and career ==
Carla Madeira was born in 1964 in Belo Horizonte. She began studying Mathematics at the Federal University of Minas Gerais without completing her degree and graduated in Journalism and Advertising from the same institution, where she also taught copywriting. She has a postgraduate degree in Marketing. She is a partner and creative director of the communications agency Lápis Raro.

Her first published work was the novel Tudo é Rio, released in 2014, the story of the love triangle between a woman, a man and a prostitute. The story began as a text she wrote fourteen years earlier, the scene of a father throwing a baby against the wall. First published by the small publishing house and bookstore Quixote, the book had a print run of seven hundred copies. Word of mouth made Tudo é Rio a sleeper hit. It was re-released in 2021 by Editora Record, one of the largest publishers in Brazil; before that, Madeira published her second book,A Natureza da Mordida, in 2019.

She was the second most read writer in Brazil in 2021, behind Itamar Vieira Junior.

== Works ==
=== Novels ===
- 2014 - Tudo é Rio (Quixote+Do; re-released in 2021 by Editora Record)
  - English translation: It's All River; translated by Alison Entrekin, Liveright, 2026, ISBN 1324098112
- 2018 - A Natureza da Mordida (Editora Record)
- 2021 - Véspera (Editora Record)

=== Short stories in anthologies ===
- 2023 - Tempo aberto: Oito décadas em oito contos de grandes autores brasileiros (Editora Record; story "Corte seco")

== Filmography ==
=== Television ===
| Year | Títle | Role | Emissora | Notes |
|---|---|---|---|---|
| 2021—22 | Um Lugar ao Sol | Collaboration | TV Globo | [nota 1] |
| TBA | Véspera | Original author | Max | [nota 2] |
