= Viih Tube =

Brazilian YouTuber

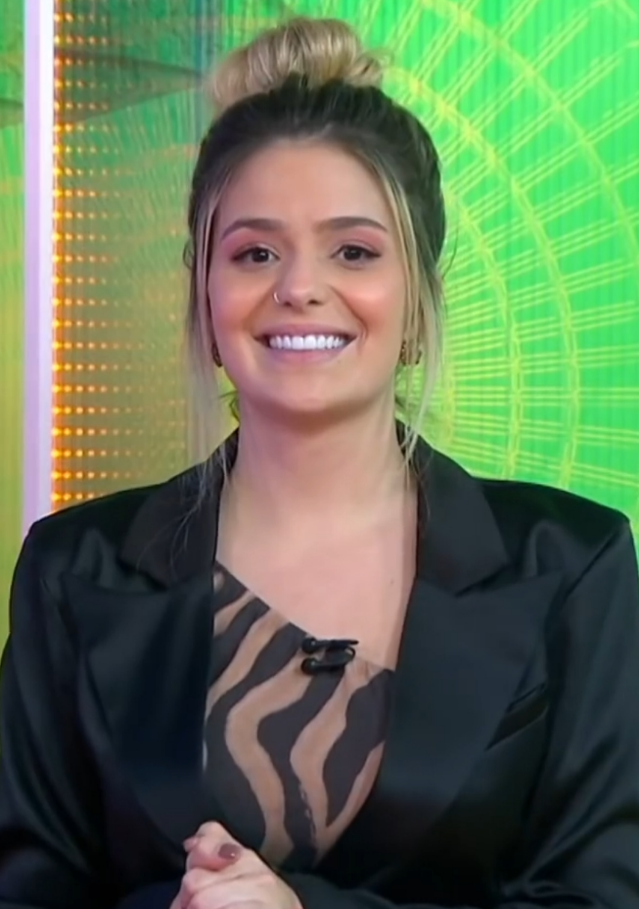
- Viih Tube in 2021
- Born: Vitória Felício Moraes; 18 August 2000 (age 26); Sorocaba, Brazil
- Years active: 2013–present
- Spouse: Eliezer do Carmo Neto (m. 2023)

YouTube information
- Channel: Viih Tube
- Subscribers: 11.2 million
- Views: 965 million
- Last updated: 21 October 2025

Vitória di Felice Moraes (born Vitória Felício Moraes; 18 August 2000), known professionally as Viih Tube, is a Brazilian YouTuber and writer. She became known for her teen videos posted on YouTube.

== Early life ==
Vitória Di Felice Moraes (formerly Vitória Felício Moraes) was born on 18 August 2000, in Sorocaba, in the interior of the State of São Paulo. Daughter of Viviane Di Felice and Fabiano Moraes, she started her career at the age of 11 on the internet and began to be recognized in 2014. Gradually, she got thousands of subscribers on her channel, receiving media attention for her playful communication towards the teenage audience, addressing topics such as relationships, professional vocation and student aesthetics, acquiring commercial success and becoming a web celebrity.

Viih Tube said in an interview, "I have always liked television and wanted to have real viewers. I also wanted to teach what I know and the things I like. The idea came about because I was lonely a lot and had nothing to do."

== Career ==
In 2016 she began her career in the performing arts, performing the following year in a tour of her independent theater piece, specializing in cinematography. She made appearances in the children's telenovela Cúmplices de um Resgate and in the attraction Programa Raul Gil. In 2020, the feature film Amiga do Inimigo, directed by Plínio Scambora, a continuation of the teen drama web series Em Prova, was released by streaming Netflix in the platform's most watched movies ranking in Brazil and Portugal. In the following year, on 19 January, she was announced as a cabin contestant in the twenty-first edition of the reality show Big Brother Brasil. She was the 13th eliminated with 96.69% of the votes in a wall against singer Fiuk and economist Gilberto Nogueira, finishing in seventh place.

In September she starred together with Bianca Rinaldi and Júlio Cocielo in the special A Fantástica Máquina de Sonhos, playing juror Hebe Camargo. In October, she released her book "Cancelada", portraying the public rejection she received in her career.

== Personal life ==
=== Activism ===
In 2016 Vitória was accused of mistreating her pet. After the repercussions, she issued a retraction video note, starring in virtual attacks and being named as the most rejected digital figure in October. In the same year, her mother sued comedian Felipe Neto for defamation and, in the first degree, the request was rejected. Later, Vitória returned to comment on the case and the death threats she experienced. After being diagnosed with depression, she became a supporter of the movement to value life and collaborated in raising awareness about mental health, the cancel culture, and suicide prevention during psychosocial support campaigns.

=== Relationship ===
She is married to Eliezer do Carmo and has a daughter, Lua, and a son, Ravi.

== Awards and nominations ==
Year	Award	Category	Nomination	Result	Ref.
2019	Rio Webfest	Melhor Elenco de Comédia	Em Prova	Won	

== Filmography ==
=== Television ===
Year	Title	Role	Notes
2016	Cúmplices de um Resgate	Vicky / Cidinha Leitão	Episodes, "5–7 de dezembro"
2019	Programa Raul Gil	Interviewer	"Youtubers Querem Saber"
2021	Big Brother Brasil	Herself (Housemate)	Season 21
2021	A Fantástica Máquina de Sonhos	Hebe Camargo	Episode, "15"
2023	Wild & Free	Herself (Panelist)	
2026	Domingo Animado	Herself (Presenter)	Episode, "January 4"
2026	TurmaTube: A Primeira Aventura	Teacher Júlia	

=== Movies ===
Year	Title	Role	Ref.
2020	Amiga do Inimigo	Beatriz Escobar (Bia)	
2022	Me Tira da Mira	Amanda Jéssica	
2024	Doce Família	Bárbara "Babi" Estrela	
2025	Zoopocalipse: Uma Aventura Animal	Gracie (voice)	
2026	Uma Babá Gloriosa	Rafaela "Rafa" Leme	

=== Internet ===
Year	Title	Role	Ref.
2017	A Espera	Priscila	
2018–2019	O Enigma	Mirella	
2019–2021	Em Prova	Beatriz Escobar (Bia)	
2019	Sem Sinal	Vitória	
2019–2020	As Férias dos Flops	Isadora Albuquerque de Menezes (Dora)	
2020	Uma Ligação	Gabi	
2020	Reflexos	Isabela	
2023–2024	MaterniDelas	Presenter	

== Books ==
Year	Title	Publisher	ISBN
2016	Tudo Tem Uma Primeira Vez	Intrinseca	ISBN 9788580579116
2017	Todo Amor Tem Segredos	Intrinseca	ISBN 9788551001332
2021	Cancelada: O Que A Internet Não Mostra	Editora Agir	ISBN 9786558370642
2024	Tô Grávida!: O Que A Gente Faz Agora?	Intrinseca	ISBN 9788551009802
