= KVSH =

- Valentine, Nebraska; United States
- Broadcast area: Cherry County, Nebraska
- Frequency: 940 kHz

Programming
- Format: Full service
- Affiliations: ABC Radio News; Citadel Media

Ownership
- Owner: Heart City Radio Company

History
- First air date: March 6, 1961
- Call sign meaning: Voice of the Sand Hills

Technical information
- Licensing authority: FCC
- Facility ID: 26612
- Class: D
- Power: 5,000 watts daytime 19 watts nighttime
- Transmitter coordinates: 42°51′54.0″N 100°31′7.0″W

Links
- Public license information: Public file; LMS
- Webcast: KVSH webstream
- Website: www.kvsh.com

KVSH (940 AM, "Heart City Radio") is a radio station licensed to serve Valentine, Nebraska, United States. The station, established in 1961, is currently owned by the Heart City Radio Company.

== Programming ==
KVSH broadcasts a Full Service format including news, talk, and country music.

In addition to its regular programming, this station also broadcasts Nebraska Cornhuskers football games as an affiliate of the Husker Sports Network.

== History ==
This station began broadcasting on March 5, 1961, with 500 watts of power on a frequency of 940 kHz. The Valentine Broadcasting Company, owned by the Huse Publishing Company as part of a four-station group of radio stations across Nebraska, initially broadcast from studios in the Marian Hotel. The station was assigned the KVSH call sign by the Federal Communications Commission.

By 1963, KVSH was authorized to increase its signal power to 5,000 watts but was still restricted to daytimer operation. The Valentine Broadcasting Company sold KVSH to the Beef Country Company in a transaction that was consummated in October 1971.

In March 1990, the Beef Country Company announced an agreement to sell this station to the Heart City Radio Company. The deal was approved by the FCC on May 21, 1990, and the transaction was consummated on June 6, 1990.
