= Camilla de Lucas =

Brazilian influencer, model (born 1994)

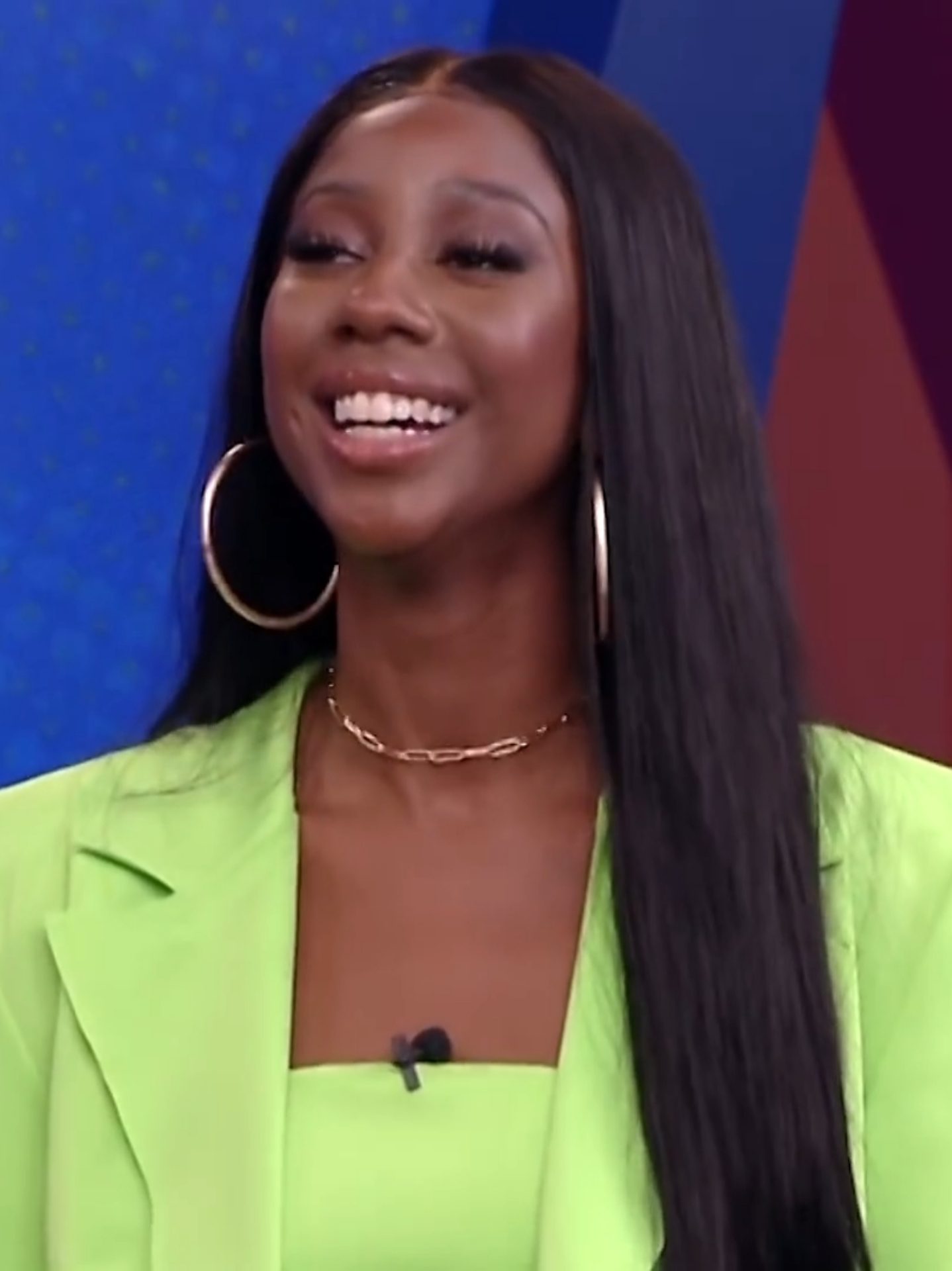
- Lucas in 2021
- Born: Camilla Jesus Santos de Lucas; 13 October 1994 (age 31); Nova Iguaçu, Rio de Janeiro, Brazil
- Occupations: Social media influencer, model, and YouTuber
- Years active: 2017–present
- Spouse: Matheus Ricardo (m. 2023)

Camilla Jesus Santos de Lucas (born 13 October 1994) is a Brazilian social media influencer, model, and YouTuber. As of April 2025, she has nearly 2.5 million subscribers on her YouTube channel where she covers a wide variety of topics. She also has a wide audience on other platforms such as TikTok and Instagram. In addition to her online presence, has also participated in shows such as Big Brother Brasil 21 and A Eliminação, as well as in movies and television shows.

== Biography ==
Lucas was born on 13 October 1994. She was born and raised in the city of Nova Iguaçu, north of Rio de Janeiro, the daughter of Maria Lucia and Marco Lucas. She is also the sister to Gabriel and Lucas. Camilla took courses in accounting, but decided to leave the course after her online career took off and began to progress.

== Career ==
Lucas began her online career in 2017 by way of uploading YouTube videos, and quickly became one of the most influential Black voices online in Brazil. During the COVID-19 pandemic, in 2020, her online presence increased after she began posting on TikTok, thereby increasing her visibility throughout her social media profiles. From there, her increasing follower base helped to bring her to the attention of large brands. With the agency Mynd8, associated with Preta Gil, Lucas began to work with large brands from various industries and, the same year, was recognized by Forbes Brazil as one of the most promising young personalities of 2020 in their Web Category of Forbes 30 Under 30. She has also taken part in programs on TV Globo, such as Encontro com Fátima Bernardes and Conversa com Bial. Through her success online, Lucas was featured on the cover of Glamour and on the cover of the magazine ELA. She also composed part of the group of 59 most creative people in 2020 in a list compiled by Wired, which was celebrated in the Wired Criative X Festival.

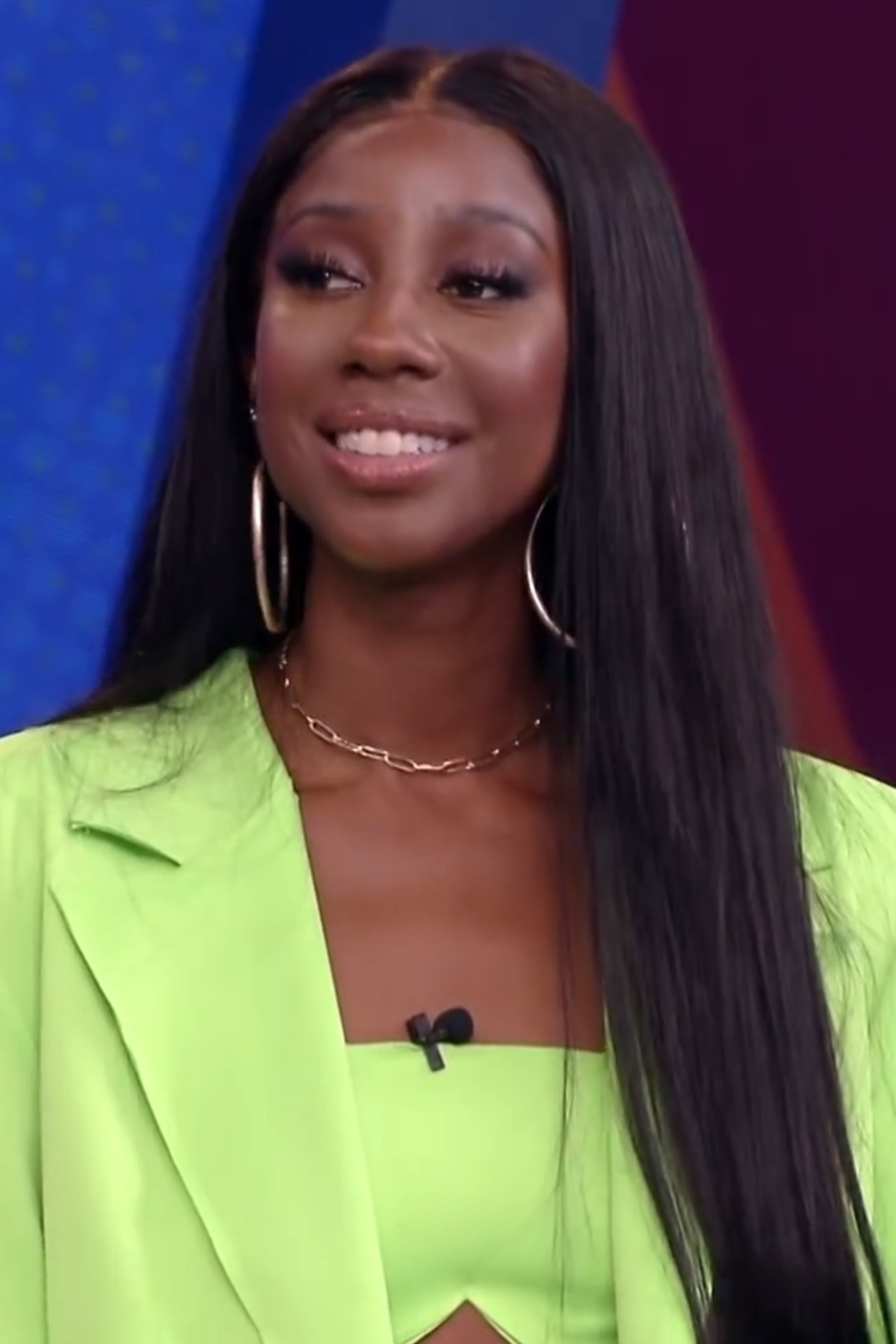
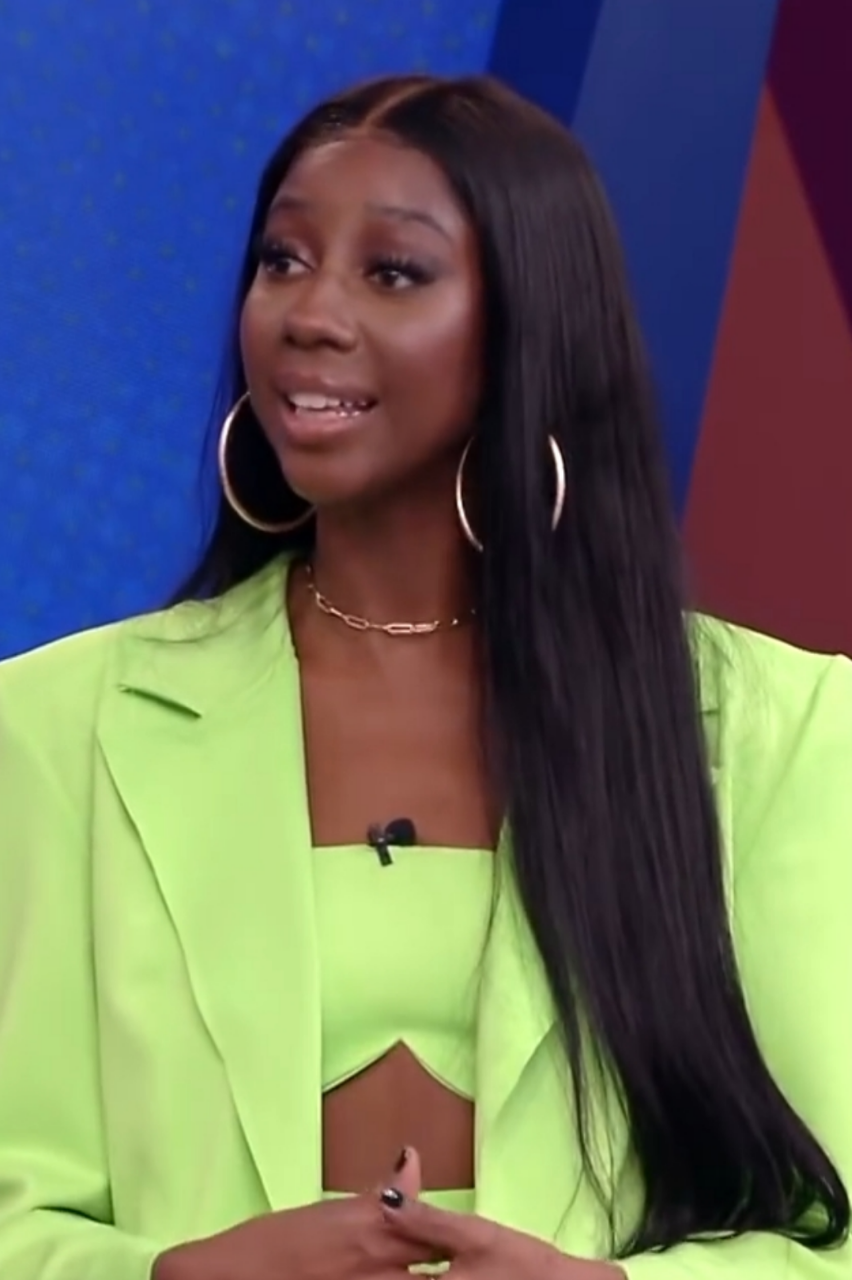
Lucas on the TV show A Eliminação in May 2021.

In 2021, she was invited to participate in the 21st season of the reality show Big Brother Brasil, which made its debut on 25 January. She went on to earn 2nd place with 5.23% of the vote. Since then, she has increased her presence even more throughout the media.

On 20 November 2021, Lucas made her debut as one of the fashion models on the runway of São Paulo Fashion Week. She would return for the 2022 edition in June 2022.

== Personal life ==
Lucas has been in a relationship with Mateus Ricardo since 2019. In October 2021, she became engaged and married on 13 May 2023.

=== Target of online harassment ===
During her time on Big Brother Brasil 21, Lucas had mentioned she was using wigs on set due to moving away from using hair straighteners and relaxers for her hair. She would go on to defend fellow contestant João Luiz after he was allegedly the target of racism by another contestant, singer Rodolffo Matthaus. After Lucas was seen wearing a new wig, she was attacked on social media by people defending Matthaus. She posted photos of herself on her Instagram stories showing her to be scared and crying, and afterwards would comment about the attacks, saying she had been suffering and criticizing people who were defending Matthaus for being "white and handsome".

Some personalities, such as the singer Iza, came to Lucas' defense with Iza posting a video involving the use of laces. Lucas also received support from economist Gil do Vigor.

== Filmography ==
=== Television ===
Year	Title	Role	Note
2021	Big Brother Brasil	Participant	Big Brother Brasil 21
2021	The Masked Singer Brasil	Presenter	
2022	Close da Bonita	Presenter	
2022	Novelei	Ruth Araújo Assunção	Episode: "Mulheres de Areia"
2023	A Sogra que te Pariu	Mila Rocha	Episode: "Noah Acredito Nisso"

=== Film ===
Year	Title	Role	Notes
2023	O Lado Bom de Ser Traída	Patrícia Alencar Rochetty (Patty)	
2025	Confia: Sonhos de Cria	Andressa	

== Awards and nominations ==
Year	Award	Category	Results	Ref.
2020	iBest Award	Beleza (popular vote)	2nd place	
2020	iBest Award	Beleza (Academia iBest vote)	3rd place	
2020	Capricho Awards	Humor	Nominated	
2020	Capricho Awards	Revelação do Ano	Nominated	
2020	Meus Prêmios Nick	TikToker do Ano	Nominated	
2020	Prêmio TodaTeen	Revelação do Ano	Nominated	
2020	Prêmio TodaTeen	TikToker Nacional	Nominated	
2020	Splash Awards	Melhor Criador(a) de Conteúdo	Nominated	
2021	iBest Award	Creator do Ano	Nominated	
2021	iBest Award	Influenciador do Ano	Nominated	
2021	iBest Award	Comportamento e Família (academia iBest)	Won	
2021	Séries em Cena Awards	Melhor Participante de Reality Show	Nominated	
2021	Melhores do Ano - RD1	Revelação	Nominated	
2021	Prêmio F5	Melhor Influenciador(a)	Nominated	
2021	Prêmio Mundo Negro	Melhor Influência	Nominated	
2021	Prêmio Mundo Negro	Melhor Creator no TikTok	Won	
2021	Prêmio Potências	Mulherão da P*	Nominated	
2021	Prêmio Potências	Nívea Personalidade do Ano	Won	
2021	Prêmio Contigo! de TV	Melhor Influenciador	Nominated	
2021	Prêmio Arcanjo de Cultura	TV Streaming	Nominated	
2021	TikTok Awards	Entregou tudo na For You	Nominated	
2021	People's Choice Awards	Influenciador do Ano Brasil	Nominated	
2021	Prêmio Área VIP	Revelação do Ano	Nominated	
