= Juan Paiva =

Brazilian actor

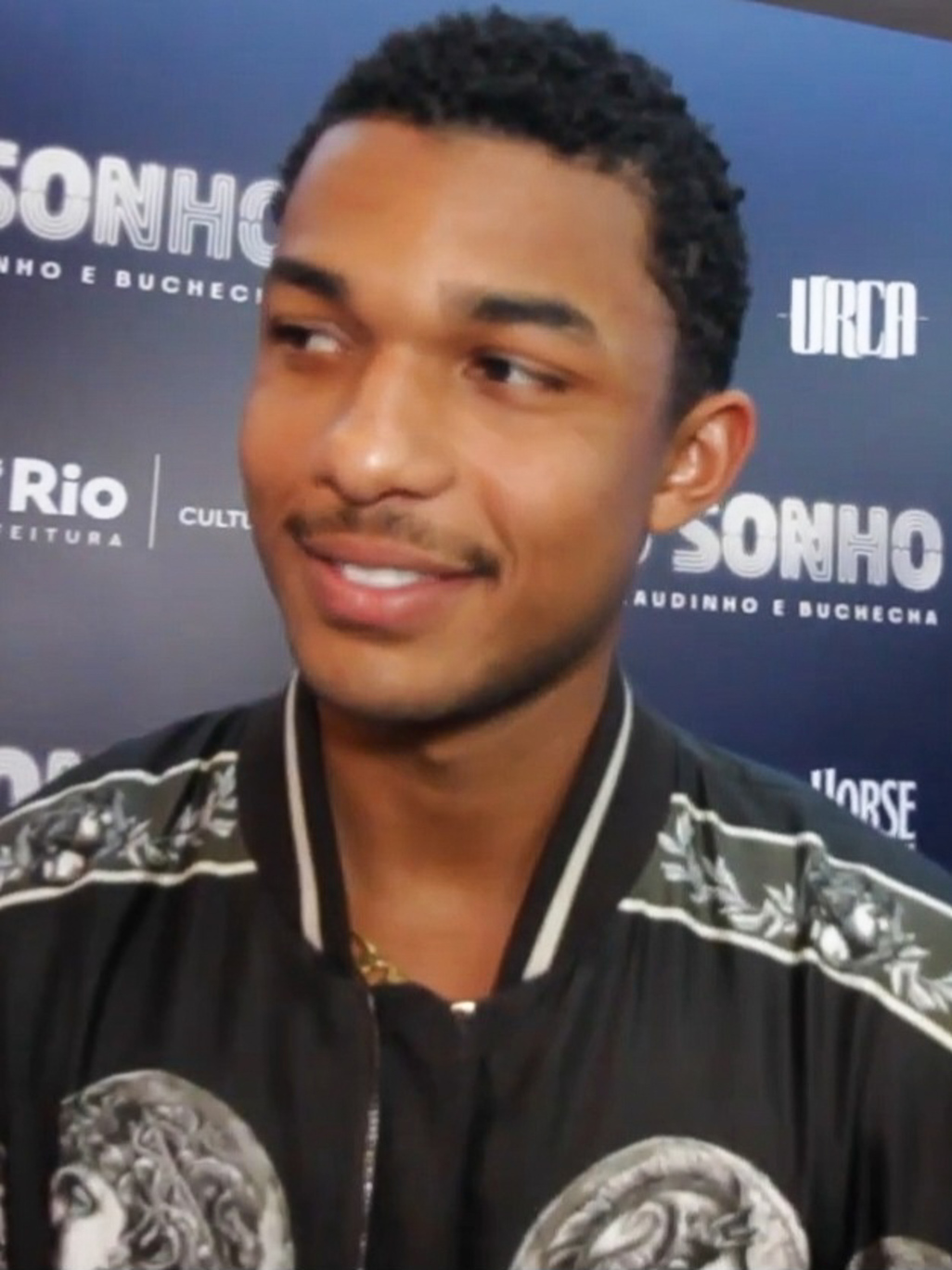
- Paiva in 2023.
- Born: 1998 (age 27–28)
- Occupation: Actor
- Notable work: Ravi in Um Lugar ao Sol João Pedro in Renascer Buchecha in Nosso Sonho

Juan Paiva (born 1998) is a Brazilian actor. A regular on Brazilian television and cinema, he is best known for his award-winning roles in the telenovelas Um Lugar ao Sol and Renascer, and for the role of Buchecha, half of the famous funk carioca duet Claudinho & Buchecha, in the 2023 film Nosso Sonho.

== Filmography ==
| Year | Title | Role | Notes |
|---|---|---|---|
| 2010 | 5x Favela - Agora por Nós Mesmos | Wesley | |
| 2013 | Vendo ou Alugo | Coisa Ruim | |
| 2015–2016 | Totalmente Demais | Wesley Castro Pereira | |
| 2017–2018 | Malhação: Viva a Diferença | Anderson Rodrigues | Season 25 |
| 2019 | Correndo Atrás | Glanderson | |
| 2019 | Sick, Sick, Sick (Sem Seu Sangue) | Arthur | |
| 2020–2024 | Um Dia Qualquer | Juninho | |
| 2020–2024 | As Five | Anderson Rodrigues | |
| 2020 | M8 - Quando a Morte Socorre a Vida | Maurício | |
| 2021–2022 | Um Lugar ao Sol | Ravi | |
| 2022 | The Masked Singer Brasil | Robô (Robot) | Season 2 |
| 2022 | Sob Pressão | Inácio | Episode: "3" |
| 2022 | Um Dia Qualquer | Juninho | |
| 2023 | Nosso Sonho | Buchecha | |
| 2024 | Renascer | João Pedro Inocêncio | |
| 2024 | Suíte Magnólia | Paulo Júlio "PJ" | |
| 2024 | Justiça 2 | Balthazar Gomes da Silva | |
| 2025–2026 | Dona de Mim | Samuel Boaz | |
| 2025 | Encantado's | Don Juan | Episode: "Estamina" |
