= Juliette (Brazilian singer) =

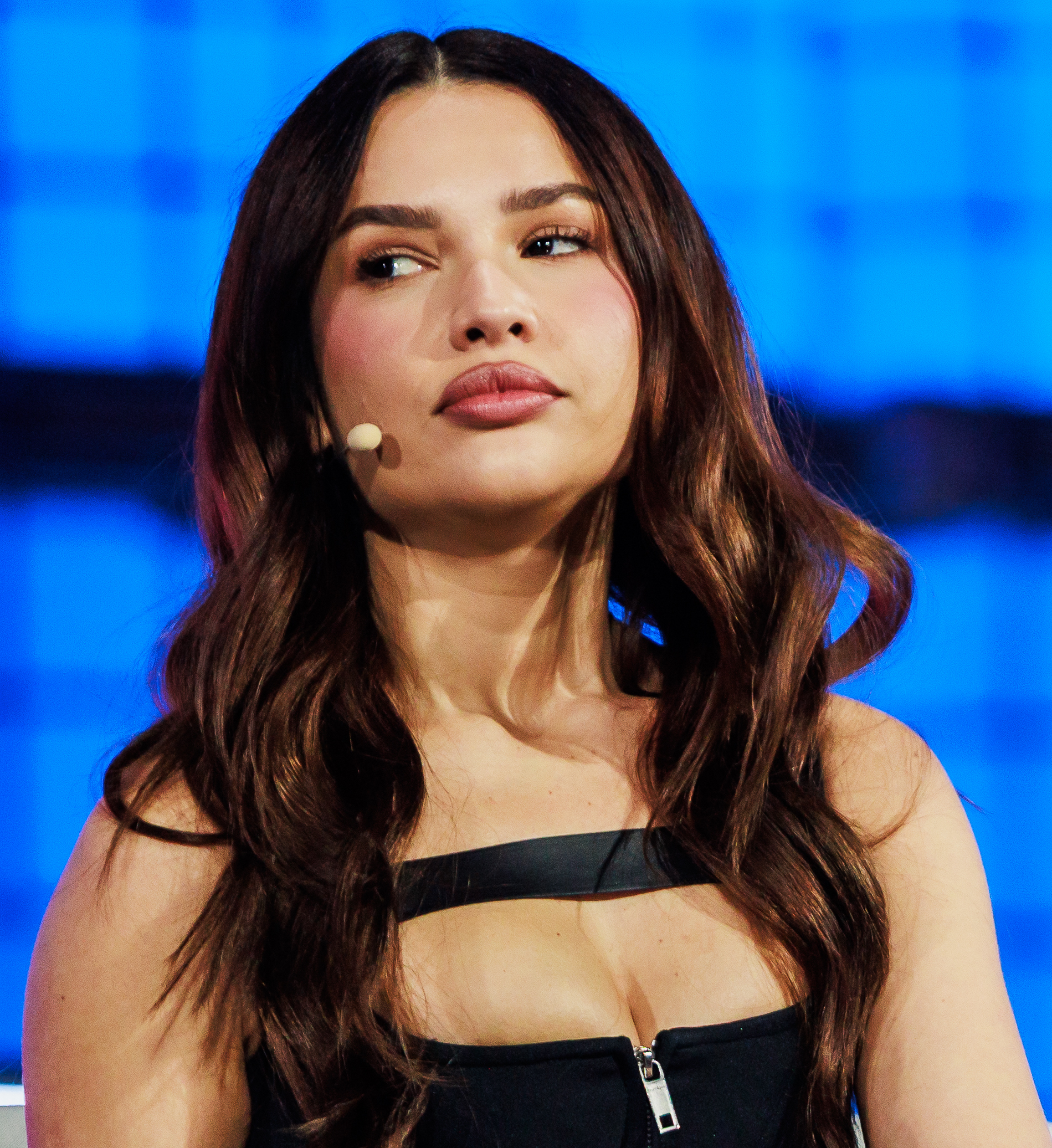
- Juliette in June 2026
- Born: Juliette Freire Feitosa; 3 December 1989 (age 36); Campina Grande, Paraíba, Brazil
- Education: Federal University of Paraíba
- Occupations: lawyer; makeup artist; singer
- Years active: 2021–present
- Musical career
- Genres: Pop; alternative pop; forró
- Instruments: Vocals
- Label: Virgin Records
- Website: juliette.art.br
- Website: juliette.art.br

Juliette Freire Feitosa (Brazilian Portuguese: [ʒuliˈɛttʃi ˈfɾejɾi]; born 3 December 1989) is a Brazilian singer, lawyer, makeup artist, television presenter and digital influencer. She became known for being the winner of the 21st season of Big Brother Brasil.

== Filmography ==
=== Television ===
Year	Title	Role	Notes
2021	Big Brother Brasil	Herself	Season 21
2021	Você Nunca Esteve Sozinha	Herself	
2021	TVZ	TV Host	
2023	Saia Justa Verão	TV Host	
2023	Queens on the Run	Guest Judge	Episode: "Caricatas em Recife"
2023	Gil Family	Herself	Episode: "Da Antimatéria ao Forró"
2025	BBB: O Documentário	Herself	

=== Film ===
Year	Title	Role	Notes
2023	Feliz Ano Novo... De Novo	Herself	

== Discography ==
=== Live album ===
Live album
Title	More info
Caminho (Ao Vivo)	Released: 28 July 2022; Label: Rodamoinho, Virgin Music; Format(s): Download digital, streaming
