= Gil do Vigor =

Brazilian economist and digital influencer

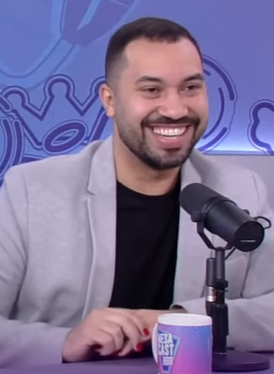
- do Vigor in 2024
- Born: July 14, 1991 (age 35); Jaboatão dos Guararapes, Pernambunco, Brazil
- Other names: Gil da Cachorrada; Rei da Cachorrada
- Education: Universidade Federal de Pernambuco
- Employer: TV Globo (since 2021)

Gilberto José Nogueira Junior (Jaboatão dos Guararapes, July 1991), also known as Gil do Vigor, is a Brazilian economist, professor, businessman, writer and digital influencer. He gained notoriety by participating in the 21st season of the reality show Big Brother Brasil, from which he was the 16th and final contestant to be eliminated.

== Biography ==
He earned a degree in Economics from the Federal University of Pernambuco, where he conducted research on the income profiles of municipalities in Pernambuco between 1999 and 2012. During his master's and doctoral studies at the same institution, he researched models of drug market repression and their effects on society. In September 2021, he began his PhD in economics at the University of California, Davis, after also being accepted to the University of Texas.
