= Casimiro (streamer) =

Brazilian journalist, YouTuber and streamer

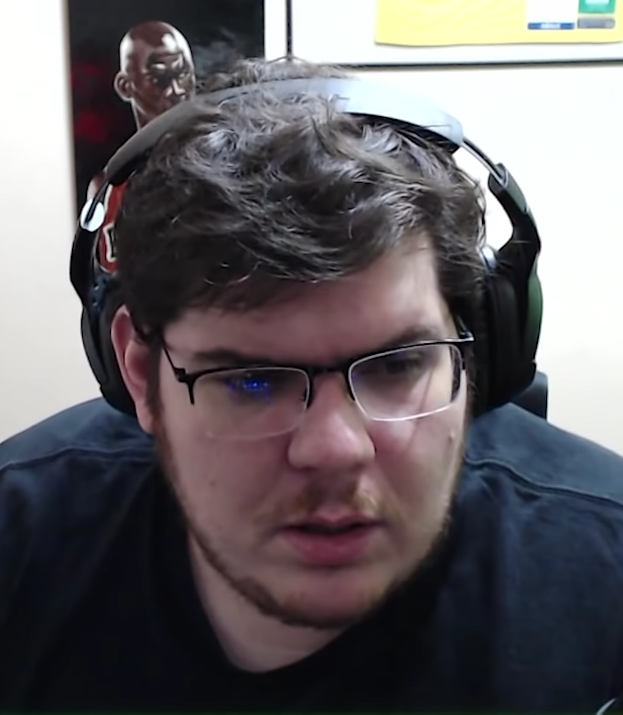
- Casimiro in 2022
- Born: Casimiro Miguel Vieira da Silva Ferreira; 20 October 1993 (age 32); Rio de Janeiro, Rio de Janeiro, Brazil
- Other names: Cazé; Kzil; Gordola; Casimito
- Occupations: Digital influencer; humourist; journalist; presenter; sports commentarist; streamer; YouTuber
- Spouse: Anna Beatriz Lima (m. 2022)

Twitch information
- Channel: Casimito
- Years active: 2018–present
- Genres: Comedy; Entertainment; Football
- Followers: 3.9 million

YouTube information
- Channel: Casimiro
- Years active: 2020–present
- Genres: Comedy; Entertainment; Football
- Subscribers: 1.14 million (main channel); 45.1 million (combined) (Note: Subscribers, broken down by channel: 1.14 million (Casimiro) 4.04 million (Cortes do Casimito) 339 thousand (Que Papinho!) 40.5 million (CazéTV))
- Views: 81.32 million (main channel); 14.06 billion (combined) (Note: Viewers, broken down by channel: 81.32 million (Casimiro) 2.40 billion (Cortes do Casimito) 10.82 million (Que Papinho!) 11.57 billion (CazéTV))

Casimiro Miguel Vieira da Silva Ferreira (Rio de Janeiro, 20 October 1993), better known as Casimiro or Cazé, is a Brazilian journalist, presenter, sports commentator, digital influencer, YouTuber and streamer. In addition to making content for the internet on his Twitch and YouTube channels, he works on the TNT Sports Brazil channels, De Sola and EI Games, all on YouTube. He is considered to be one of the most popular streamers in Brazil.

== Career ==
Born in Rio de Janeiro, son of Portuguese immigrants Amadeu Marques Ferreira (1951) and Maria de Fátima Vieira da Silva Ferreira (1955), Casimiro began to gain prominence first on the Esporte Interativo channel (today TNT Sports Brazil) presenting the program "EI Games", at the same time he participated in the YouTube channel "De Sola", a skit humor channel and football content that also belongs to TNT Sports. Casimiro attended college in journalism, but did not finish it. In January 2019, he was invited to comment on SBT Sports Rio along with Pedro Certezas, to cover the vacation of the main commentators of the program.

Casimiro garnered more exposure in 2021 through daily livestreams on Twitch. The popular catchphrase, "meteu essa?" was used as an internet meme while the live streams garnered increased attention through football broadcasts and comedy, thus creating an audience composed primarily of the younger generation. As a result, Casimiro became one of the major breakthrough streamers for the year. Casimiro also became the fifth most-watched streamer in Brazil.

Due to his rise in 2021, he was one of 15 nominees for the Comunique-se Award, in the category "Digital Influencer Journalist", won the iBest Award in the "Twitcher of the Year" category and won the eSports Brazil Award in the "Person of the Year" category (he was also nominated for the "Best Streamer of the Year" category, but did not win this one). It also reached the mark of 200 million views on its YouTube channel.

In January 2022, he announced that he would leave SBT to invest in other projects and on the 22nd of the same month, it was announced that Casimiro would broadcast 16 Campeonato Carioca games on his Twitch lives after closing a partnership with the company LiveMode, which is responsible for managing some championships such as Paulista and Copa do Nordeste.

After watching and reacting to the first episode of Netflix's "Neymar - O Caos Perfeito" series, Casimiro managed to beat the record for simultaneous viewers on Twitch in Brazil on 24 January 2022, with more than 545,000 people watching the broadcast, mark that made him reach first place in the largest national broadcasts on the platform, in addition to having also entered the top 10 peak viewership in the history of global Twitch, occupying the ninth place. In April 2022, he became the streamer with the most subscribers in the world, surpassing 97,000 users. On 19 May, Casimiro was banned from Twitch for 48 hours for copyright infringement, while streaming the best moments of the Europa League. He was unbanned after 3 hours and 27 minutes.

On 1 July, he announced that he would start a new channel and project on YouTube, entitled "Que Papinho!", being a kind of program where Casimiro will interact with numerous personalities both from the world of football and abroad. On 4 November, Casimiro announced a partnership with FIFA to broadcast 22 games of the 2022 FIFA World Cup in Qatar in YouTube, Twitch and FIFA's own streaming service, FIFA+. On 24 November, during a game between Brazil and Serbia for Group G, Casimiro broke a worldwide record with more than 3.48 million viewers in his livestream in YouTube. The achievement was previously held by Brazilian sertanejo singer Marília Mendonça, with 3.31 million viewers during a livestream in 2020.

On 19 December 2022, the day after broadcasting the FIFA World Cup Final on his YouTube and Twitch channels, the streamer married Anna Beatriz de Almeida Lima in Rio de Janeiro. Casimiro and Anna Beatriz met through a humor page related to C.R. Vasco da Gama and dated for almost ten years before getting married.
