= Fruto do Tempo =

2026 single by Luísa Sonza

Single by Luísa Sonza

from the album Brutal Paraíso
- Released: 26 March 2026
- Length: 4:05
- Label: Sony Brazil
- Songwriters: Luísa Sonza; Douglas Moda; Kalli; Nico Wellenbrink; Vinícius de Moraes; Baden Powell
- Lyricist: Sonza
- Producers: Moda; Kalli; Sonza

Luísa Sonza singles chronology
"Telefone" (2026)	"Fruto do Tempo" (2026)

Music video
- "Fruto do Tempo" on YouTube

"Fruto do Tempo" (Portuguese: [ˈfɾutu du ˈtẽpu], "Fruit of Time") is a song by Brazilian singer-songwriter Luísa Sonza. It was released on 26 March 2026 by Sony Music Brazil as the second single from her fifth studio album, Brutal Paraíso (2026). The lyrics were written by Sonza, while the composition was developed by her alongside Nico Wellenbrink, Douglas Moda and Kalli, with Sonza, Moda and Kalli handling the production. The track incorporates a sample of the bossa nova composition "Consolação", written by Vinícius de Moraes and Banden Powell, who are consequently credited as songwriters.

== Composition ==
"Fruto do Tempo" serves as a conceptual response to Sonza's version of "Consolação", which appeared on her previous album, Bossa Sempre Nova.

"'Fruto do Tempo' was born because 'Consolação' makes me think about the answers I have to some of the questions in that song and about how things are nowadays, and none of them seemed optimistic: 'And if there were no love? It would be better if everything ended.'" (Note: Original Portuguese: "'Fruto do Tempo' nasceu porque 'Consolação' me faz pensar nas respostas que tenho para algumas perguntas dessa música e em como estamos hoje em dia, e nenhuma delas me parecia otimista: 'E se não tivesse o amor? Melhor era tudo se acabar.'") — Luísa Sonza, about the track "Fruto do Tempo", according to Billboard Brasil.

== Release and promotion ==
On 23 March 2026, six days after the release of the album's lead single, "Telefone", Sonza surprised her fans by announcing the second single, "Fruto do Tempo", via her social media accounts. She shared an acoustic preview of the track and stated that the single and its music video would be released three days later, on 26 March at 21:00 (São Paulo time).

== Critical reception ==
Mauro Ferreira of G1 praised the song, stating that it sets the right tone for an album in which the artist explores themes such as "guilt, desire, fragility, and addiction" (Note: Original Portuguese: "culpa, desejo, fragilidade e vício".) with a contemporary sound. The critic also noted that the track is consistent with the single's promotional text, bringing Sonza closer to the realms of rock and post-punk.

== Music video ==
Directed by Diego Fraga in collaboration with the duo Hanoi Filmes, the official music video for "Fruto do Tempo" was described by POPline as "dark and painful" (Note: Original Portuguese: "sombrio e doloroso".). In the video, two versions of Luísa Sonza appear: the artist from her new phase, dressed in black, symbolically buries her 2023 self, who is placed in a coffin wearing the clothes and aesthetic of her previous album, Escândalo Íntimo. According to Billboard Brasil, this "symbolic death" (Note: Original Portuguese: "morte simbólica".) represents the end of a cycle and the beginning of a new phase in Sonza's artistic development.

== Track listing ==
- Digital download
1. "Fruto do Tempo" – 4:05
2. "Telefone" – 1:31

== Credits and personnel ==
Credits adapted from Tidal.

- Luísa Sonza – vocals, songwriter, producer
- Douglas Moda – songwriter, producer
- Kalli – songwriter, producer
- Nico Wellenbrink – songwriter
- Vinícius de Moraes – songwriter
- Baden Powell – songwriter
- Luciano Scarlecio – mixing engineer
- Arthur Luna – mastering engineer
