= If I Were Luísa Sonza =

2023 Brazilian biographical documentary series about Luísa Sonza

- Genre: Documentary
- Screenplay by: Carolina Albuquerque (boss)
- Directed by: Isabel Nascimento Silva
- Starring: Luísa Sonza
- Country of origin: Brazil
- Original languages: Portuguese; English
- No. of seasons: 1
- No. of episodes: 3

Production
- Executive producers: Luísa Barbosa; Renata Brandão
- Production locations: São Paulo; Tuparendi; Los Angeles
- Editor: Sergio Mekler
- Production companies: Conspiração Filmes; Hysteria

Original release
- Network: Netflix
- Release: December 13, 2023

Se Eu Fosse Luísa Sonza (English: If I Were Luísa Sonza) is a biographical docu-series, produced by Netflix, which looks at the career and personal life of Brazilian music artist Luísa Sonza. The original premiere took place on December 13, 2023, with three episodes.

In September, the date and name of the series were revealed. The trailer was released on November 27.

During the documentary, it presents the singer's life from her beginnings in the band Sol Maior to her latest album release, which is Escândalo Íntimo, which came out in August of the same year, until then.

== Cast ==
- Luísa Sonza
- César Luís Sonza: Dad
- Eliane Gerloff: Mom
- Karla Gerloff: Cousin
- Nadine Gerloff: Cousin
- Lucas Pinho: Artistic director
- Gabriel Geraissati: Producer
- Flavio Verne: Artistic director and choreographer
- Douglas Moda: Producer
- André Corga: Artistic director
- Tay Vargas: Former personal assistant
- Whindersson Nunes: Ex-husband (1st episode)
- Mino Lehnhardt: Entrepreneur (1st episode)
- Judeilton Reis (1st episode)
- Foquinha: Journalist (1st episode)
- Zé Ricardo: Singer-songwriter (2nd episode)
- Fátima Pissarra: Entrepreneur (2nd episode)
- Antonio Pontes: ENT specialist (3rd episode)
- Victor Lenzo: Stylist (3rd episode)
- Melina Tavares (3rdt episode)
- Roy Lenzo: Producer (3rd episode)

== Dubbing ==
- Courtney Lin as Luísa Sonza
- Stephen Fu as Lucas Pinho
- Alan Trinca as Douglas Moda
- David Cui Cui as Flavio Verne
- Erin Nicole Lundquist as Eliane Gerloff

=== Technical sheet ===
- Studio: Deluxe Los Angeles
- Dubbing Director: Chelsea Pancho
- Project Manager: Anna Aitova
- Adapter: Anna McClnnan
- Recordist: Sutter Hellwarth
- Editor: Tony McVan
- Mixer: Tony McVan
- Dubbing Assistant: Kimberly Siboura

== Episodes ==
No.	Title	Original release date
1	"The World is a Mill"	December 13, 2023
Luísa vents about her debut in the pop music industry and the profound impact social media had on her relationship with Whindersson Nunes.
2	"I'm My Worst Hater"	December 13, 2023
How do you rise above the fall? Luísa reminisces about the debut of "Doce 22" and speaks about a controversial time in her life.
3	"Intimate Scandal"	December 13, 2023
A serious injury forces Luísa to remain silent for 20 days. Afterward, she embarks on a trip to LA to work on her album and fulfill an old dream.

== See also ==
- List of original programs distributed by Netflix
