= Brutal Paraíso =

Studio album by Luísa Sonza
- Released: 7 April 2026
- Recorded: 2024–2026
- Genres: Pop; urbano; Brazilian funk; bossa nova; rock
- Length: 67:35
- Languages: Portuguese; English; Spanish
- Label: Sony

Luísa Sonza chronology
Bossa Sempre Nova (2026)	Brutal Paraíso (2026)

Singles from Brutal Paraíso
- 1. "Telefone" Released: 17 March 2026; 2. "Fruto do Tempo" Released: 26 March 2026

Brutal Paraíso (Portuguese: [bɾuˈtaw paɾaˈizu]; Brutal Paradise; stylized in all caps) is the fifth studio album by Brazilian singer-songwriter Luísa Sonza, released on April 7, 2026. The project continues the narrative begun in Escândalo Íntimo (2023), delving deeper into themes related to emotional maturity, disillusionment, excess, and self-knowledge. With 23 tracks and over an hour of music, the album is structured in sonic and thematic blocks that move between introspection, sensuality, and drama. The work mixes genres such as pop, bossa nova, Brazilian funk, reggaeton, alternative rock, and electronic music, creating a stylistic mosaic marked by both diversity and a deliberate lack of cohesion. The album features collaborations with artists such as Xamã, Young Miko, Sebastián Yatra, MC Morena, MC Meno K, and MC Paiva.

Initially conceived under the pseudonym "LS4" (later "LS5"), the album presents itself as an ambitious and multifaceted work, reflecting the artist's personal transformations after turbulent periods in her public and private life. The title synthesizes the album's central duality: the coexistence of harshness and beauty in the human experience. Confessional lyrics explore suffering, self-sabotage, unstable relationships, desire, and disillusionment, frequently engaging with references to classic Brazilian music, such as compositions by Vinicius de Moraes, Tom Jobim, and Gilberto Gil.

The release of Brutal Paraíso was marked by an intense and performative strategy, including urban actions in São Paulo, direct interactions with fans, and viral campaigns on social media. Singles such as "Telefone" and "Fruto do Tempo" preceded the release, which quickly achieved strong performance on digital platforms, accumulating millions of plays in the first few hours. The album received mixed reviews from critics, being described as bold and excessive. While some praised its ambition and visual impact, others pointed out problems with cohesion and length. Upon its release, the album surpassed 1 million streams on Spotify. In total, 13 of the album's 23 tracks appeared in Spotify Brazil's daily Top 200, debuting with 4.1 million streams in the first 24 hours.

== Background ==
At a free concert held at Parque Burle Marx in São Paulo on 17 March 2024, during the promotion of her third album Escândalo Íntimo, Luísa Sonza revealed that her fourth album, nicknamed "LS4", was already in development.

In early January 2026, the collaborative album Bossa Sempre Nova was announced, in partnership with musicians Roberto Menescal and Toquinho, and released on January 13. The project took shape during the recording of the work then nicknamed "LS4," which was also scheduled for release later in 2026.

== Composition ==
=== Songs ===
Brutal Paraíso opens with "Distrópico", an introductory track described by Carol Prado, of Estadão, as "full of confusing and disjointed beats”, foreshadowing the lack of cohesion in the songs that follow. Next, "Fruto do Tempo" functions as a dark and reflective conceptual response to the bossa nova piece "Consolação", by Vinicius de Moraes and Baden Powell, also incorporating an interpolation of the original work. "Amor, Que Pena!", while maintaining bossa nova influences, combines the genre’s characteristic rhythm with "pop bass" and lyrics centered on the "collapse of expectations", drawing inspiration from the song "Que Pena", by Jorge Ben Jor. The fourth track, "E Agora?", a collaboration with Brazilian rapper Xamã, begins with a "bossa nova-style guitar" and evolves into electronic music. Shortly after, "Loira Gelada" responds to the song "Louras Geladas" by the band RPM., incorporating a sample of the work and presenting the character’s point of view, marked by addiction and temptation; the track blends an "electropop atmosphere" that ultimately returns to bossa nova. It is followed by "Santa Maculada", a rock song in which the lyrical self reveals its full complexity, unfolding into intense emotions and internal conflicts, while also reproducing verses from "Pena Verde", by Abílio Manoel. Returning to bossa nova as its foundation, "Diferentemente" explores the character’s recognition of patterns of self-sabotage in her own life. The following track, "Sempre Você", is described by Billboard Brasil as pointing “toward the desire for a calmer kind of love, although this stability is always temporary.”

From the album’s ninth track, "Tropical Paradise", onward, Brutal Paraíso shifts toward more sensual and upbeat compositions. The following song, "Safada", a collaboration with Puerto Rican rapper Young Miko, further deepens this theme. Next, "Telefone" portrays the hypocrisies of contemporary relationships through provocative lyrics. "Sonhei Contigo", featuring MC Morena and MC Meno K, begins with an electronic sound and English-language verses before giving way to the intense arrangements of Brazilian funk, accompanied by lyrics in Portuguese. In "French Kiss", a duet between Sonza and MC Paiva, the funk elements build gradually. The 14th track, "No Es Lo Mío", is a Spanish-language funk track, while "Tu Gata", a collaboration with Colombian singer Sebastián Yatra, closes the album’s more upbeat section.

The interlude "Piedade" marks the beginning of the album’s third section, described by Dora Guerra, of G1, as "entering a dated pop rock sound, with dramatic compositions between emo and worship." "Doce Mentira" features references to the song “Brigas Nunca Mais”, by Antônico Carlos Jobim and Vinicius de Moraes. It is followed by "Que o Amor Morra", which explores the need to stop idealizing love as a sustaining force, allowing the lyrical self to preserve and survive beyond it. The subsequent tracks, "O Som da Despedida" and "Depois do Fim", lead to a more serene understanding amid the album’s emotional journey. In "Quando", a more mature perspective on endings and new beginnings is presented, drawing inspiration from the composition "Depois", by Marisa Monte. During the 22nd track, "A Vida Como Ela É", there is a reference to the song "Andar com Fé", by Gilberto Gil. The closing track, "Brutal Paraíso", was written as a letter to the artist’s niece, in which she reflects on life’s ups and downs based on her own experiences—including fear, meaninglessness, disillusionment, and acceptance—ending with the line “Today, I sing for myself." (Note: Original Portuguese: Hoje é por mim que eu canto)

== Critical reception ==
Professional ratings
Review scores
Source	Rating
G1	3/5 stars
G1	5.5/10
DiscoAvaliadoBR	7,3/10

Brutal Paraíso received generally mixed reviews from music critics. Reviews were published by critics including Dora Guerra and Mauro Ferreira of G1, Leonardo Lichote of Billboard Brasil, Carol Prado of Estadão, André Luiz Freitas of Conexão POP, and Gabriel Silva of DiscoAvaliadoBR.

Guerra described the album as a project that "leans into excess", resulting in what she considered a "tiring" listening experience. According to the critic, although the album contains strong musical moments, they ultimately become "lost" amid its lengthy runtime. Ferreira similarly criticized the project’s excessive nature, not only in its music but also in its conceptual and promotional aspects. He highlighted the exaggerated marketing campaign, the abundance of references, and the lack of cohesion between styles and themes as some of the record’s main shortcomings, while still acknowledging its positive moments. Ferreira further argued that the album presents a "diffuse" concept, concluding that "divided between the distant dream of paradise and the concrete disillusionment of life as it is, the artist ignored that less is sometimes [...] more". (Note: Original Portuguese: "dividida entre o sonho distante do paraíso e a desilusão concreta da vida como ela é, a artista ignorou que menos é às vezes [...] mais.")

In contrast, Lichote praised the impact of the release, highlighting its visual maturity and Sonza’s ability to maintain her prominence within the Brazilian pop scene. Freitas described the album as a work in which the artist "masters her own chaos" while redefining Brazilian pop, praising its fluid transitions between 1980s-inspired rock, funk, and bossa nova. He further stated that the project demonstrates a "lucidity that cuts through scars" and solidifies Sonza’s artistic maturity by abandoning public justifications in favor of a rich and versatile production.

Silva described the project as a "fascinating" journey, though he criticized its excessive number of tracks and the lack of cohesion among the genres explored. While praising the experimentation of songs such as "Loira Gelada", the critic argued that the album occasionally becomes lost in its own ambition, concluding that its blend of styles and extended runtime leave the record "adrift in its own experimentation".

== Track listing ==
Credits adapted from Tidal.

Brutal Paraíso track listing
No.	Title	Writer(s)	Length
1.	"Distrópico"	Luísa Sonza; Douglas Moda; F3LP	0:55
2.	"Fruto do Tempo"	Sonza; Moda; Kalli; Nico Santos; Vinícius de Moraes; Baden Powell	4:04
3.	"Amor, Que Pena"	Sonza; Carolina Marcílio; Roy Lenzo; Moda; Ariana Wong; Jahnei Clarke	2:54
4.	"E Agora?" (with Xamã)	Sonza; Geizon Fernandes; Moda; LiTek; WhyJay; Celso Castro; Fernando Mendes; José Wilson	3:24
5.	"Loira Gelada"	Sonza; Moda; Carlos Bezebra; 6ee; Burek; Dokii; Luiz Schiavon; Paulo Ricardo	3:12
6.	"Santa Maculada"	Sonza; Moda; Bezebra; Michael Pozzi; Mike Hermosa; Abilio Manoel	2:14
7.	"Diferentemente"	Sonza; Moda; Scot Harris; Kaiyi	2:05
8.	"Sempre Você"	Sonza; Lenzo; Wong; TK Kayembe	3:35
9.	"Tropical Paradise"	Sonza; Njomza Vitia; Moda; Tommy Brown; Parker Ighile; Tec Beatz	1:52
10.	"Safada" (with Young Miko)	Sonza; María Victoria Cardona; Vicente "Vibarco" Jiménez; Flávio Verne; Lenzo; Moda; Wong; Clarke; Kayembe; Diego Lopez; Miguel Montoya	2:21
11.	"Telefone"	Sonza; Marcílio; Verne; Lenzo; Moda; Wong; Clarke; Kayembe; MC Denny; Selminho DJ	1:31
12.	"Sonhei Contigo" (with MC Morena and MC Meno K)	Marcílio; Verne; Vitia; Valquíria Rosa; Kauan Soares; Lenzo; Moda; David Biral; Denzel Baptiste	3:04
13.	"French Kiss" (with MC Paiva)	Sonza; Davi Paiva; Moda; 6ee; Burek; Dokii; F3LP; Manu Manu; Scar; Seezy	3:45
14.	"No Es Lo Mío"	Sonza; Vibarco; Lenzo; Moda; Wong; Clarke; Kayembe	1:58
15.	"Tu Gata" (with Sebastián Yatra)	Sonza; Vibarco; Sebastián Giraldo; Lenzo; Moda; Kayembe; Jonathan "Yoni" Asperil	2:46
16.	"Interlúdio - Piedade"	Sonza; Moda	0:45
17.	"Doce Mentira"	Sonza; Kim Jiseob; AGWI	2:30
18.	"Que o Amor Morra"	Sonza; Lenzo; Moda; Asperil	3:15
19.	"O Som da Despedida"	Sonza; Lenzo; Moda; Wong; Kayembe; Asperil	3:42
20.	"Depois do Fim"	Sonza; Lenzo; Moda; Wong; Kayembe; Asperil	3:19
21.	"Quando"	Sonza; Asperil	3:42
22.	"A Vida Como Ela É"	Sonza; Marcílio; Vibarco; Lenzo; Moda; Wong; Asperil	2:39
23.	"Brutal Paraíso"	Sonza; Moda; Bezebra; Francci; BlackDoe	8:01

== Personnel ==
Credits adapted from Tidal.

Performers and musicians

- Luísa Sonza – lead vocals (tracks 2–15, 17–23); production (tracks 2, 3, 5–14, 17, 10, 19, 20, 22, 23)
- Xamã – featured artist (track 4)
- Young Miko – featured artist (track 10)
- MC Morena – featured artist (track 12)
- MC Meno K – featured artist (track 12)
- MC Paiva – featured artist (track 13)
- Sebastián Yatra – featured artist (track 15)

Production

- Roy Lenzo — production, keyboards, synthetizer (tracks 3, 8, 10–12, 14, 15, 18–20, 22); drums (3, 8, 10–12, 14, 15, 18–20); engineer, executive production (tracks 2–15, 17–23); recording engineer (track 10)
- Jahnei Clarke — production, drums, synth bass, synthetizer (tracks 3, 10, 11, 14); mixing engineer (track 3); electronic drums (track 14)
- Douglas Moda — production (tracks 2, 3, 5–9, 11–13, 15, 18–20, 22, 23); bass (track 22)
- Ariana Wong — production (tracks 3, 8, 10, 11, 14, 19, 20, 22); piano (tracks 3, 10, 20, 22)
- TK Kayembe — production (tracks 8, 10, 11, 14, 15, 19, 21)
- Luciano Scalercio — mixing engineer (tracks 2, 4–13, 15, 17–23)
- Arthur Luna — mastering engineer (tracks 2–15, 17–23)
- Joel Quatrocchi — assintant singineer (tracks 3, 8, 10–12, 14, 15, 18–20, 22)
- Victor Hugo Baião — assistant mixing engineer (all tracks)
- Jonathan "Yoni" Asperil — production (tracks 15, 18–22)
- Carlos Bezebra — production (tracks 5, 6, 23)
- Kalli — production (track 2)
- 6ee — production (track 5)
- Burek — production (track 5)
- Dokll — production (track 5)
- PMM — production (track 5)
- Michael Pozzi — production, bass, guitar (track 6)
- Mike Hermosa — production (track 6)
- Karl Wingate — engineer (track 6)
- Kaiyi — production (track 7)
- Marqueze Perez — production (track 9)
- Tommy Brown — production (track 9)
- Tec Beatiz — production (track 9)
- MC Denny — sampler (track 13)
- DJ Kokadah — sampler (track 13)
- Dana Zulpykhar — violin (track 11), strings (track 20)
- David Biral — production (track 13)
- Denzel Baptiste — production (track 13)
- Manu Manu — production (track 13)
- Pedro Bala — production (track 13)
- Seezy — production (track 13)
- Felp — production (track 13)
- Scar — production (track 13)
- DJ Swivel — mixing engineer (track 14)
- AGWi — production (track 17)
- Kim Jiseob — production (track 17)
- Demi Albano — drums (tracks 19, 20)
- BlackDoe — production, bass, keyboards (track 23)
- Francci — production (track 23)

== Certifications ==
Certifications for Brutal Paraíso
Region	Certification	Certified units/sales
Brazil (Pro-Música Brasil)	Gold	40,000^{‡}
^{‡} Sales+streaming figures based on certification alone.
