= Garabí-Panambi Hydroelectric Complex =

Hydroelectric power stations in Argentina and Brazil

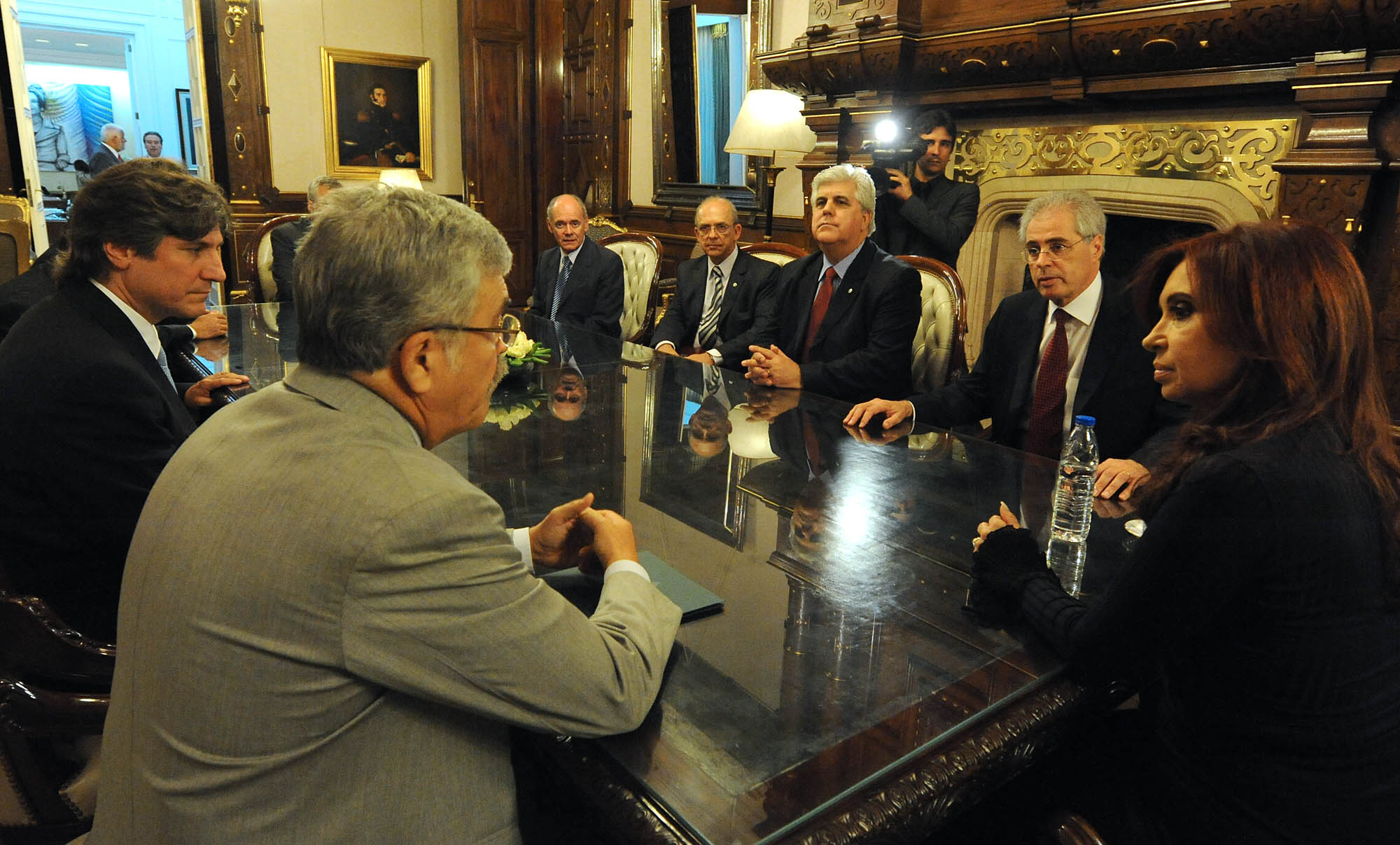
- December 2011 meeting with Argentine president Cristina Fernández de Kirchner

- Location within Brazil
- Official name: Complexo Hidrelétrico Garabi-Panambi
- Country: Argentina, Brazil
- Coordinates: 28.227032°S 55.716181°W
- Purpose: Hydroelectric
- Status: Planned

The Garabí-Panambi Hydroelectric Complex (Portuguese: Complexo Hidrelétrico Garabi-Panambi) is a planned pair of hydroelectric dams and generating stations on the Uruguay River between Argentina and Brazil. There is controversy over the environmental impact on the fast-flowing river. The prime contractors are trying to avoid public image problems and delays such as those with other recent dams.

== Concept ==
The Garabi-Panambi Hydroelectric Complex on the Uruguay River has been projected to generate 2,200 MW of electric power, which Argentina and Brazil would share equally. The estimated cost of the project is US$5.2 billion. About 12,500 people would be employed on the project, of whom 70% would be local workers. The project is a joint venture of Eletrobras of Brazil and Emprendimientos Energéticos Binacionales (Ebisa) of Argentina. The Garabí and Panambí dams would be built in the Corrientes and Misiones provinces of Argentina, and the Garruchos and Alecrim municipalities of Rio Grande do Sul in Brazil. The exact location would depend on the results of geological studies of the sites.

== Criticism ==
The reservoirs will displace 7,500 people in Brazil and over 5,100 people in Argentina. Environmentalists are opposed to the project, citing the massive floods of the Madeira River after construction of the Jirau and Santo Antônio dams in Rondônia. The projections of flooded areas are only a quarter of those made in the 1970s and 1980s, but the combined reservoirs would cover more than that of the Belo Monte plant, which will have five times greater capacity. A biologist argued that the nature of the river would be transformed from a fast-moving river with rapids to standing water, affecting the ability of fish to reproduce. Eletrobras has guaranteed that the Yucumã Falls, the largest longitudinal waterfall in the world, and the Turvo State Park would be preserved, but there was fear that 10% would be flooded by the Panambi reservoir. Electrobras has stated that flooding in Turvo could only occur during flood periods.

== Early proposals ==
Transnational projects on the Uruguay River have a long history. In a convention between Argentina and Brazil signed on 14 March 1972 three sites were selected: Roncador, or Panambí, with 2,700 MW, Garabi with 1,800 MW and San Pedro with 1,700 MW. Arguments in favor of the projects were that they would support development of the local and regional economies, would help make the two countries independent of external energy suppliers by using a renewable resource, and would avoid using hard currency resources. In 1973 an agreement was made between Agua y Energía Eléctrica (AyE) of Argentina and ELETROBRAS of Brazil to study the potential of the middle section of the Uruguay and its tributary the Pepirí-Guazú. A hydroelectric complex with dams at San Pedro, Garabí and Roncador-Panambí was considered most suitable, and the results of initial technical and economic studies were presented in 1977. The governments signed a treaty in 1980 covering guidelines for construction and energy production. The basic design of the Garabí Hydroelectric Project was delivered in 1986, and in 1988 was jointly agreed as a project between the two countries.

The 1988 plan envisioned a Garabí reservoir elevation of 94 metres (308 ft), installed capacity of 1,800 MW and annual production of 6,000GWh. The dam would flood about 81,000 hectares (200,000 acres), with roughly the same area flooded in each country. The Roncador dam would have a reservoir elevation of 164 metres (538 ft) and installed capacity of 2,800 MW. It would flood the Uruguay River valley in the region of the Moconá/Yucuma Falls, and part of the Turvo State Park. The prospect of losing the falls and a protected area of rich biodiversity caused renewed opposition by environmental and social movements. The project was halted in 1991 due to changes in the energy sectors in Argentina and Brazil.

In 1994 completed or under construction hydroelectric projects in the region included the Ilha Solteira Dam, Jupiá Dam, Três Irmãos Dam, Porto Primavera Dam, Itaipu Dam and Yacyretá Dam on the Paraná River and the Roncador/Panambí Dam, Garabí Dam, São Pedro Dam and Salto Grande Dam on the Uruguay River. Planning for the Garabí Hydroelectric Project was restarted in 1996 but was handicapped by economic crises in both countries and growing resistance by civil society movements due to the environmental and social impact.

== Later alternatives ==
Talks restarted in 2002, and the project was included in the Initiative for the Integration of the Regional Infrastructure of South America (IIRSA) plan. A new project named Garabí XXI was launched in 2003. This envisioned a dam at Garabí with an elevation of 74 metres (243 ft) and a dam at Santa María with an elevation of 94 metres (308 ft). Both would have an installed capacity of 900 MW and a reservoir of about 20,000 hectares (49,000 acres). The area flooded in Argentina would be reduced from 40,000 to 15,000 hectares (99,000 to 37,000 acres). In April 2004, the Argentine company IMPSA proposed a plan where the Garabí elevation was reduced to 82.5 metres (271 ft), the Roncador dam was cancelled and two new dams were built, San Javier at 110 metres (360 ft) with installed capacity of 900 MW and Santa Rosa at 130 metres (430 ft). All three dams would have installed capacity of 900 MW. Under this plan the area flooded would be about 73,000 hectares (180,000 acres).

Brazil and Argentina signed an agreement in 2005 for two possible dams, the Garabí Dam with 1,150 MW and the Panambí Dam with 1,050 MW. Eletrobras and EBISA were to undertake the project, expected to be completed by 2013, although it had met some local opposition. In November 2007 the Brazilian head of state Luiz Inácio Lula da Silva and his Argentinian counterpart Cristina Fernández de Kirchner agreed to prioritize construction of the Garabí binational dam. Next day the planning ministers of Brazil and Argentina endorsed the presidents' agreements on exchange of energy. The governments of Corrientes and Rio Grande do Sul wanted to implement the Garabí Binational Project as quickly as possible.

== Current proposal ==
On 7 December 2007 a protocol to the treaty was signed to create a joint technical commission, and on 22 January 2008 the presidents signed a joint declaration that confirmed their decision to implement the Garabí Hydroelectric Project. In November 2009 the presidents signed an agreement to form a joint international company to supervise construction, operation and maintenance of the Garabí Binational Hydroelectric Complex. In mid-2013 Eletrobras held a public meeting sponsored by the Council for Economic and Social Development to discuss the proposed Garabi and Panambí hydroelectric plants. Over 500 attendees included farmers, fishermen, politicians and others from both countries. Eletrobras presented engineering and environmental studies, but emphasized that no decision to proceed had been taken, and community approval would be key. This emphasis on dialog may be to avoid problems like those experienced with the Teles Pires and Belo Monte projects.

In February 2014 the Brazilian Institute of Environment and Renewable Natural Resources (IBAMA) approved the terms of reference for rescuing the fauna. The survey was to start in April 2014. On 7 April 2014 the Eletrobras director of generation told the mayors of the region in which the Garabi and Panambí hydroelectric plants were being studied that the dams would be built only if they improved the lives of the local people. He said that, as with all Eletrobras hydroelectric projects, the towns that participated would see improvements in quality of life and infrastructure. Start of work would depend on approval by the governments of the two countries following feasibility and environmental impact studies, and would then be completed within five years.

At the request of the Federal Public Ministry, in January 2015 a federal judge granted a preliminary injunction to stop the environmental licensing process for the Panambi plant. The main issue was that the reservoir would flood 60 hectares (150 acres) of the Turvo State Park, which holds regionally threatened flora and fauna, some at risk of extinction. IBAMA's terms of reference for licensing did not conform to the park's legislation and was not approved by the state secretariat of the environment (SEMA). The Garabi plant was not affected by the ruling. In April 2015 the regional federal tribunal upheld the suspension, since IBAMA's Environmental Impact Study would have been "flagrantly illegal".

== Sources ==
- "Argentina y Brasil ratifican acuerdos por Garabí", Mo Mirandu (in Spanish), 20 November 2007
- "Brasil y Argentina acordaron priorizar la concreción de la represa Garabí", El Territorio (in Spanish), 21 November 2007
- Caubet, Christian G. (1995-01-01), "Grands Barrages Internationaux: Aspects du Droit de la Cooperation dans le Bassin de la Plata", Barrages internationaux et coopération (in French), KARTHALA Editions, ISBN 978-2-86537-587-5
- Cigana, Caio (29 March 2014), "Ambientalistas cerram fileiras contrárias aos novos aproveitamentos hidrelétricos do Rio Uruguai", Zero Hora (in Portuguese), Grupo RBS
- Cigana, Caio (27 January 2015), "Justiça paralisa processo de licenciamento ambiental da Usina hidrelétrica de Panambi", Zero Hora (in Portuguese), Grupo RBS
- Complejo Hidroeléctrico Garabi (in Spanish), M'Biguá, Ciudadanía y Justicia Ambiental, archived from the original on 2016-11-19
- Eletrobras apresenta Garabi-Panambi a prefeitos (in Portuguese), Eletrobras CGTEE, 7 April 2014
- "Eletrobras proactive in engaging public about Garabi, Panambi hydroelectric plants", Hydroworld, Santa Rosa, Brazil: PennWell Corporation, 10 August 2013
- Enerdata (2011), Brazilian Energy Report, Enerdata, GGKEY:XK288JCZUJF
- Millar, Agustin A. (1994), O Gerenciamento dos Recursos Hidricos e o Mercado de Anguas (in Spanish), IICA Biblioteca Venezuela, GGKEY:WA8Y13EBZP0
- TRF4 mantém suspenso licenciamento de Hidrelétrica Panambi (in Portuguese), Tribunal Regional Federal da 4a Região, 4 May 2015
