= Bossa Sempre Nova =

Studio album by Luísa Sonza, Roberto Menescal, and Toquinho
- Released: 13 January 2026
- Genre: Bossa nova
- Length: 41:11
- Language: Portuguese
- Label: Sony Brazil
- Producer: Roberto Menescal; Douglas Moda; Toquinho

Luísa Sonza chronology
Escândalo Íntimo (2023)	Bossa Sempre Nova (2026)	Brutal Paraíso (2026)

Roberto Menescal chronology
O Lado B da Bossa Nova (2025)	Bossa Sempre Nova (2026)

Toquinho chronology
Novas Cores, Eternas Canções (2025)	Bossa Sempre Nova (2026)

Bossa Sempre Nova (Portuguese: [ˈbɔsɐ ˈsẽpɾi ˈnɔvɐ]; Bossa Always Nova) is a studio album by the Brazilian singer and songwriter Luísa Sonza, recorded in collaboration with the Brazilian musicians Roberto Menescal and Toquinho. Released on 13 January 2026 through Sony Music Brazil, the album is rooted in bossa nova and features reinterpretations of classic songs from the genre, alongside one original track written by Sonza and Menescal.

== Production ==
Bossa Sempre Nova took shape during the recording sessions for Luísa Sonza's fourth solo studio album, tentatively titled LS4, scheduled for release in 2026.

== Critical reception ==
Professional ratings
Review scores
Source	Rating
DiscoAvaliadoBR	6.7/10
Folha de S.Paulo	2/5 stars
G1	4/5 stars
O Globo	6.5/10

Bossa Sempre Nova received mostly mixed-to-positive reviews from critics. Positive reviews praised the album for its fidelity to the classic bossa nova style, its organic texture, and its compelling, contemporary reimagining of the genre. Reviewers noted that blending the style with a modern sensibility could help connect younger generations to bossa nova. Conversely, other critics questioned Sonza's fit within the genre, arguing that the singer does not fully align with the bossa nova aesthetic and criticizing her vocal delivery and interpretation of established standards.

Mauro Ferreira of G1 gave the album a positive review, highlighting its faithfulness to the genre. According to Ferreira, Sonza delivers "an album with an organic texture, extremely reverent to bossa nova," eschewing subversive approaches in favor of classic interpretations. He also praised the singer's vocal dexterity in revisiting genre standards and agreed with Roberto Menescal, stating that Sonza proves to be a legitimate bossa nova interpreter. Gabriel Silva of the website DiscoAvaliadoBR praised the re-recordings of classic Bossa nova tracks, even when the album verges on parody. In reviewing Bossa Sempre Nova, he described it as "a chaotic attempt at the Brazilian sound."

On the other hand, Felipe Maia of Folha de S.Paulo gave the project a negative review, asserting that the singer does not fully suit the style. Although he praised the album's instrumentation, Maia noted that Sonza's vocals clashed with the bossa nova aesthetic. Analyzing her cover of "O Barquinho", Maia stated that "there is a clear vocal drive anchored in mannerisms spanning her signature pop style and the vaneira of her origins as a southern Brazilian dance band singer." He added that her "vibratos and rigid phrasings clash with the sleek harmony of the song, famously encapsulated by the restrained voice of Nara Leão."

== Track listing ==
Bossa Sempre Nova track listing
No.	Title	Lyrics	Performers	Length
1.	"Consolação"	Toquinho; Baden Powell	Luísa Sonza & Toquinho	2:51
2.	"Só Tinha de Ser Com Você"	Antônio Carlos Jobim; Aloysio de Oliveira	Luísa Sonza & Toquinho	2:34
3.	"Você"	Roberto Menescal; Tim Maia; Ray Gilbert	Luísa Sonza & Roberto Menescal	2:54
4.	"Carta ao Tom 74"	Toquinho; Vinícius de Moraes	Luísa Sonza & Toquinho	2:34
5.	"Samba de Verão"	Paulo Sérgio Valle; Marcos Valle	Luísa Sonza & Roberto Menescal	2:35
6.	"Triste"	Jobim	Luísa Sonza & Roberto Menescal	3:15
7.	"Águas de Março"	Jobim	Luísa Sonza & Toquinho	3:03
8.	"Onde Anda Você"	Moraes; Hermano Silva	Luísa Sonza & Toquinho	2:32
9.	"Nós e o Mar"	Menescal; Ronaldo Bôscoli	Luísa Sonza & Roberto Menescal	3:30
10.	"O Barquinho"	Menescal; Bôscoli	Luísa Sonza & Roberto Menescal	2:51
11.	"Um Pouco de Mim"	Sonza; Menescal	Luísa Sonza & Roberto Menescal	3:54
12.	"Ah! Se Eu Pudesse"	Menescal; Bôscoli	Luísa Sonza & Roberto Menescal	2:36
13.	"Tarde em Itapoã"	Toquinho; Moraes	Luísa Sonza & Toquinho	3:19
14.	"Diz Que Fui Por Aí"	Zé Keti; Hortênsio Rocha	Luísa Sonza & Roberto Menescal	2:35
Total length:				41:11

== Personnel ==
Credits are adapted from Tidal.

- Luísa Sonza – vocals
- Douglas Moda – production (tracks 1–14)
- Arthur Luna – mixing, mastering (1–14)
- Luciano Scalercio – mixing, mastering (1–14)
- Chris Wiesen – engineering (1–14)
- Toquinho – production, vocals, acoustic guitar, direction (1, 2, 4, 7, 8, 13)
- Beto Mendonça – engineering (1, 2, 4, 7, 8, 13)
- Ivani Sabino – bass guitar (1, 2, 8)
- Pedro Paulo D'Elia – drums (1, 2, 8)
- Marco Pontes Caixote – piano (1, 2, 8)
- Roberto Menescal – production (3, 5, 6, 9–12, 14, 15), acoustic guitar (3, 5, 6, 9–12, 14), conductor (3, 5, 6, 9, 12, 14)
- Didier Fernan – mixing (3, 5, 6, 9–12, 14), bass guitar (14)
- Alexandre Caldi – flute, saxophone (3, 5, 6, 9, 12)
- Adriano Giffoni – bass guitar (3, 5, 6, 9, 12)
- Joao Cortez – drums (3, 5, 6, 9, 12)
- Adriano Souza – keyboards (3, 5, 6, 9, 12)
- Roy Lenzo – mixing, mastering, engineering, vocal production (15)

== Release history ==
Release dates and formats for Bossa Sempre Nova
Region	Date	Format	Label	Ref.
Various	13 January 2026	Digital download; streaming	Sony	
