= Destino (2025 TV series) =

2025 Brazilian Boys' Love miniseries

- Also known as: Destino
- Genre: Drama; Romance; LGBT
- Written by: Yeda Labrunie
- Directed by: Yeda Labrunie
- Country of origin: Brazil
- Original language: Portuguese
- No. of seasons: 1
- No. of episodes: 4

Production
- Running time: 25 minutes
- Production company: AENAS (Associação Elas Nas Artes)

Original release
- Network: YouTube
- Release: November 2025

Destino is an independent Brazilian romantic drama miniseries with a Boys' Love (BL) theme, produced by Associação Elas Nas Artes (AENAS). Written and directed by Yeda Labrunie, the series was filmed in Divinópolis, Minas Gerais, and released in November 2025 on the official AENAS channel on YouTube.

== Synopsis ==
Theo, a young man coping with the loss of his mother, is pressured by his father to work as an intern at the family company. There he meets Lucca, another intern, and the two gradually develop a relationship shaped by personal growth and emotional discovery. The storyline portrays an office romance while addressing themes of grief, self-discovery, and the challenges of professional life.

== Cast ==
=== Main ===
- Gian Botelho as Theo
- Renato Loureiro as Lucca
- Marcel Castro
- Larissa Dias
- Marcos Rabelo
- Dri Gutes
- Yeda Labrunie

== Production ==
The project was conceived by Yeda Labrunie in 2025, initially planned as a small-scale production but expanded with the support of friends and collaborators. The miniseries was financed through donations, raffles, and product sales. Filming took place in September 2025 in Divinópolis, Minas Gerais, and the series was released in November 2025.

== Broadcast ==
Destino was released on the official AENAS YouTube channel, consisting of four episodes of approximately 25 minutes each. The miniseries premiered in November 2025.

== Reception ==
The miniseries received significant attention from both specialized media and audiences. Doramazine praised the sensitive and innovative portrayal of an office romance, while G1 reported that the production went viral, surpassing half a million views online.

Aiigodoramas emphasized the importance of the series for LGBTQIA+ representation in Brazilian audiovisual media, and AsiaOn highlighted the premiere of the first episode as a milestone for independent productions.
