= Tiradentes (disambiguation) =

Tiradentes (1746–1792) was a Brazilian hero of the Independence Movement.

Tiradentes may also refer to:

== Places ==
- Tiradentes, Minas Gerais, a city in the state Minas Gerais, Brazil
- Tiradentes do Sul, a municipality in the state Rio Grande do Sul, Brazil
- Tiradentes (São Paulo Metro), a station on Line 1 (Blue) of the São Paulo Metro

== Sports ==
- Grêmio Esportivo Tiradentes, a Brazilian football (soccer) club
- Sociedade Esportiva Tiradentes, a Brazilian football (soccer) club
- Associação Esportiva Tiradentes, a Brazilian football (soccer) club
