= Derrubadas =

Municipality in Rio Grande do Sul, Brazil

Coordinates: 27°15′S 53°52′W

- Municipality
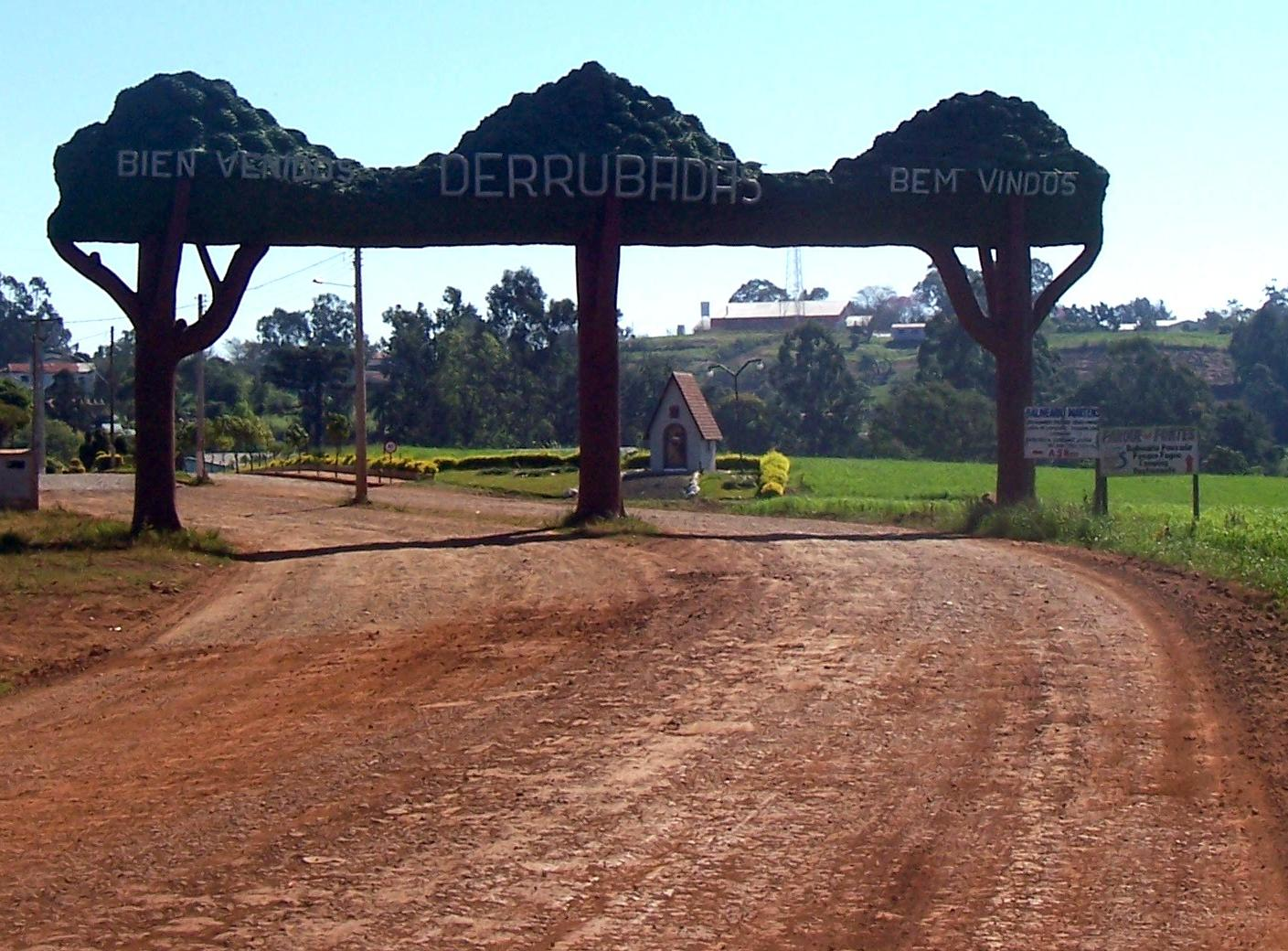

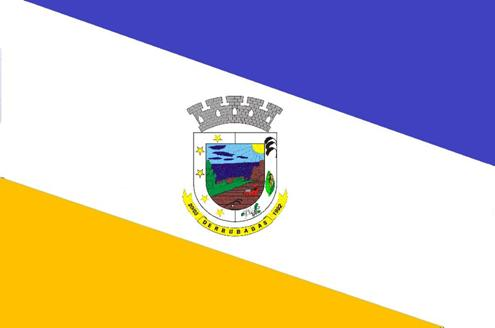
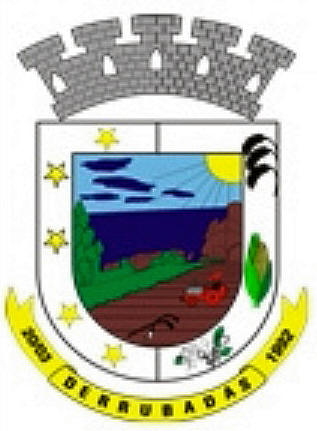
- Flag Coat of arms

- Location of Derrubadas in Rio Grande do Sul
- Country: Brazil
- Region: South
- State: Rio Grande do Sul
- Mesoregion: Noroeste Rio-Grandense
- Microregion: Três Passos
- Founded: 20 March 1992

Government
  - Mayor: Alair Cemin (MDB, 2021 - 2024)

Area
  - Total: 360.851 km^{2} (139.325 sq mi)

Population (2021)
  - Total: 2,718
  - Density: 7.532/km^{2} (19.51/sq mi)
- Demonym: Derrubadense
- Time zone: UTC−3 (BRT)
- Website: Official website

Derrubadas is a municipality of the Brazilian state of Rio Grande do Sul.

== Geography ==
It is located at 27º15'53" South, 53º51'39" West, at an altitude of 485 meters above sea level. In 2020, its population was estimated at 2,761 people.

Occupying an area of 365.44 square kilometers, it is bounded in the north by the Uruguay River, where it is opposite Argentina and the state of Santa Catarina.

The municipality contains the 17,491 hectares (43,220 acres) Turvo State Park, created in 1947. The state park covers almost half of the municipality. The municipality would be partially flooded by the proposed Panambi Dam.

== See also ==
- List of municipalities in Rio Grande do Sul
