= Turvo State Park =

State park in Rio Grande do Sul, Brazil

- Parque Estadual do Turvo
- IUCN category II (national park)
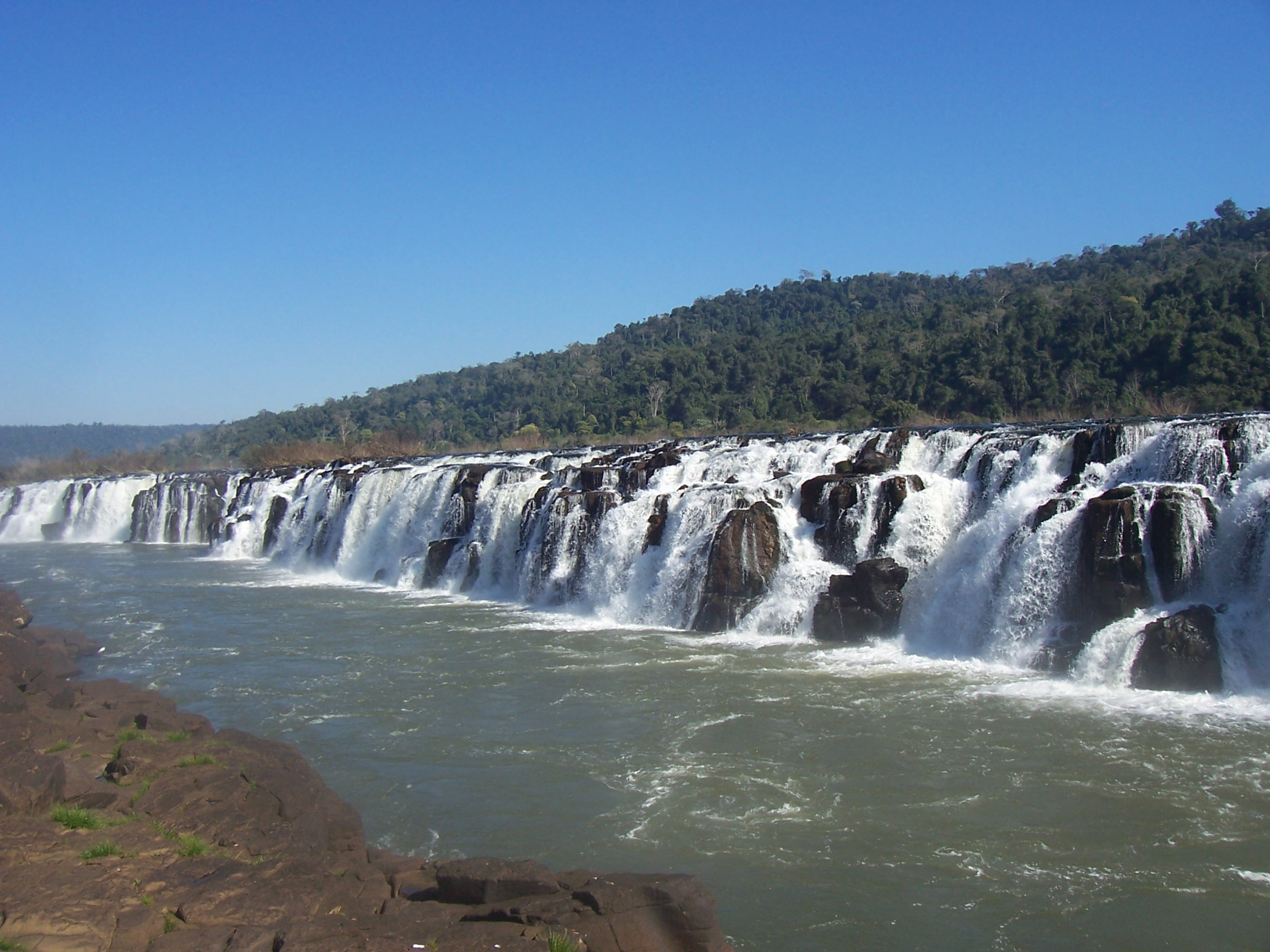
- Yucumã or Moconá Falls

- Location within Brazil
- Coordinates: 27.202077°S 53.897995°W
- Area: 17,491 hectares (43,220 acres)
- Designation: State park
- Created: 11 March 1947
- Administrator: SEMA/RS

The Turvo State Park (Portuguese: Parque Estadual do Turvo) is a state park in the state of Rio Grande do Sul, Brazil. It protects the last large area of well-preserved Upper Uruguay forest in the state, which is home to several rare or endangered species. The park is best known for the dramatic Yucumã Falls on the Uruguay River, the second-widest in the world by some measures. The falls may be threatened by flooding from the planned Garabí-Panambi Hydroelectric Complex if a 2015 court ruling is overturned.

== Location ==
The Turvo State Park is in the Northwest of Rio Grande do Sul, covering almost half of the municipality of Derrubadas. It has an area of 17,491.40 hectares (43,222.2 acres). To the north Argentina and Santa Catarina are the other side of the Uruguay River. The park is bounded to the west by the Turvo River and to the east by the Parizinho River. There are rural properties to the south.

The park includes the Yucumã Falls (Portuguese: Salto do Yucumã, Spanish: Saltos del Moconá (Note: In the Guarani language Yucumã means "the big fall" and Moconá means "to swallow everything".)), a dramatic linear waterfall on the border with Argentina. These have been called one of the seven wonders of the state. The park is open to the public from Wednesday to Sunday, with a small admission fee. There are two trails in the park, Garcia and Yucumã, both accessible to vehicles, but only the Yucumã trail is open to the public.

Sketch map

Pets are not allowed in the park, and fishing and hunting are prohibited. There is no accommodation in the park, and camping is not allowed. There is a visitor center just inside the park entrance, with a biodiversity exhibition, environmental education space, auditorium and washrooms. The building also houses the park staff. There is a "trail of ponds" at the visitor center which may only be visited when accompanied by a guide. A 15 kilometres (9.3 mi) dirt trail for vehicles leads from the visitor center to the falls. In the leisure area by the falls there is a house used only by the park rangers. There are bathrooms, shelters and grills for use by visitors, but no electricity or drinking water.

== History ==
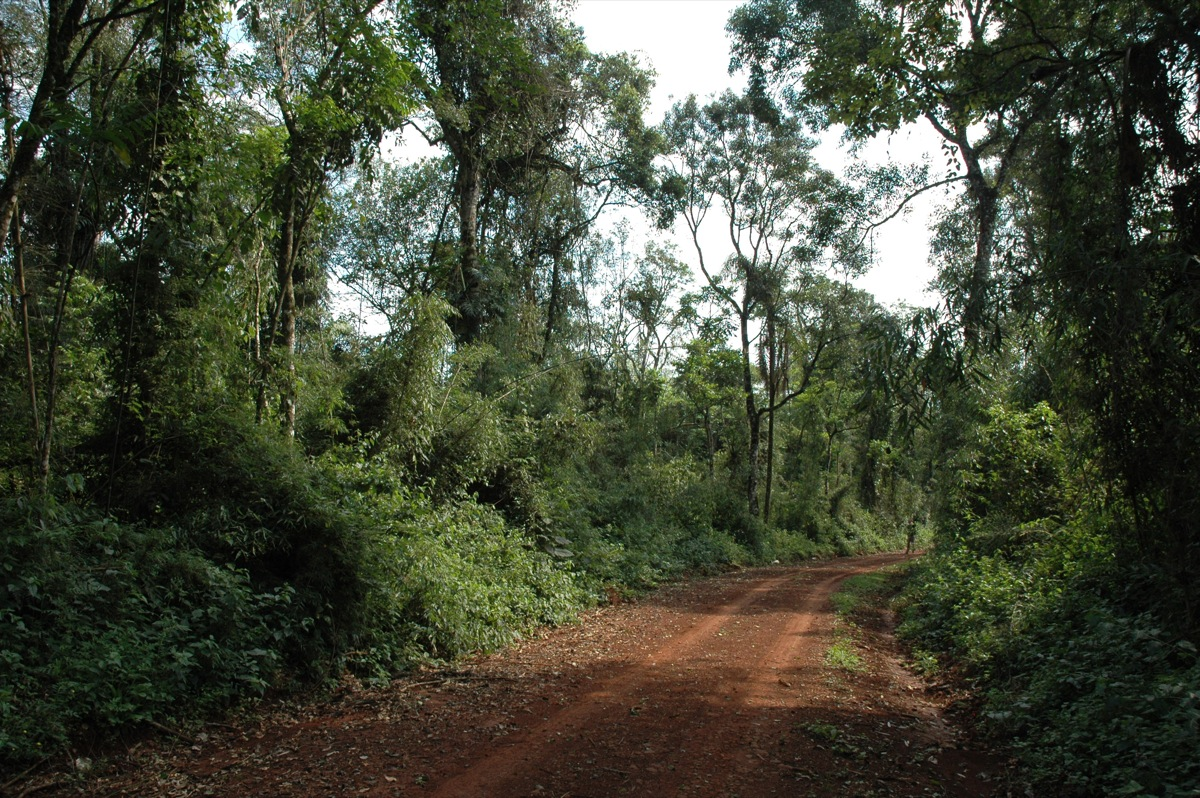
Road in the park

Turvo was one of the first conservation units in the state and the largest fully protected unit. The area was made a state forest reserve by decree 2.312 on 11 March 1947, protecting untouched lands covered with native forest on the banks of the Uruguay River between the mouths of the Turvo and Pari rivers, then in the Tenente Portela district. The objective was to protect the forest and provide refuge for fauna. Any type of alienation, lease or encumbrance, or any agricultural or industrial exploitation was prohibited.

Law 2440 of 2 October 1954 transformed all forests owned by the state with over 250 hectares (620 acres) into state parks, apart from areas that had deforested or transformed into rural lots. As a result, the Turvo State Forest Reserve became the Turvo State Forest Park. In state parks, it is forbidden to hunt, fish, cut native species, open fire breaks, thin the forest or subdivide it into fields. Starting in 1954, visitors could access Porto Garcia, a beach on the Uruguay River. Decree 17.432 of 11 August 1965 altered the limits of the park. It lost 146.1 hectares (361 acres). The park was mapped in 1976, and its management plan published in 1980. In 1983 a 14.8 kilometres (9.2 mi) road was opened from the park boundary to the Yucumã Falls, and a 2 hectares (4.9 acres) visitor's area was opened at the falls with tables, rustic benches and barbecues. Toilets and kiosks with barbecues and sinks were added at the end of the 1980s.

In January 2015, a federal judge granted a preliminary injunction to stop the environmental licensing process for the Panambí Dam at the request of the Federal Public Ministry. The main issue was that the reservoir would flood 60 hectares (150 acres) of the Turvo State Park, which holds regionally threatened flora and fauna, some at risk of extinction. The Brazilian Institute of Environment and Renewable Natural Resources (IBAMA) terms of reference for licensing did not conform to the park's legislation and was not approved by the state secretariat of the environment (SEMA). In April 2015, the regional federal tribunal upheld the suspension, since the IBAMA Environmental Impact Study would have been "flagrantly illegal". The rapporteur noted that the hydroelectric project should conform to the park's requirements rather than the reverse.

The park would be part of the proposed Trinational Biodiversity Corridor, which aims to provide forest connections between conservation units in Brazil, Paraguay and Argentina in the Upper Paraná ecoregion.

== Environment ==
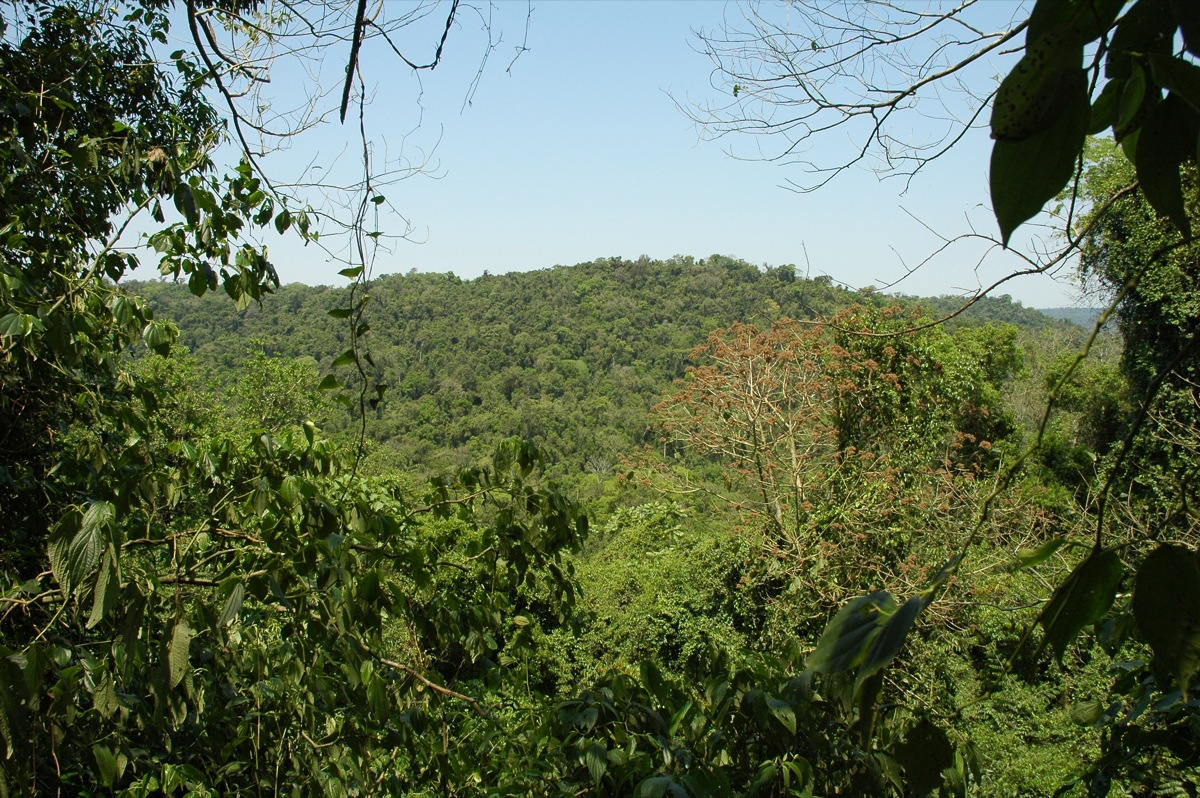
Interior of the park

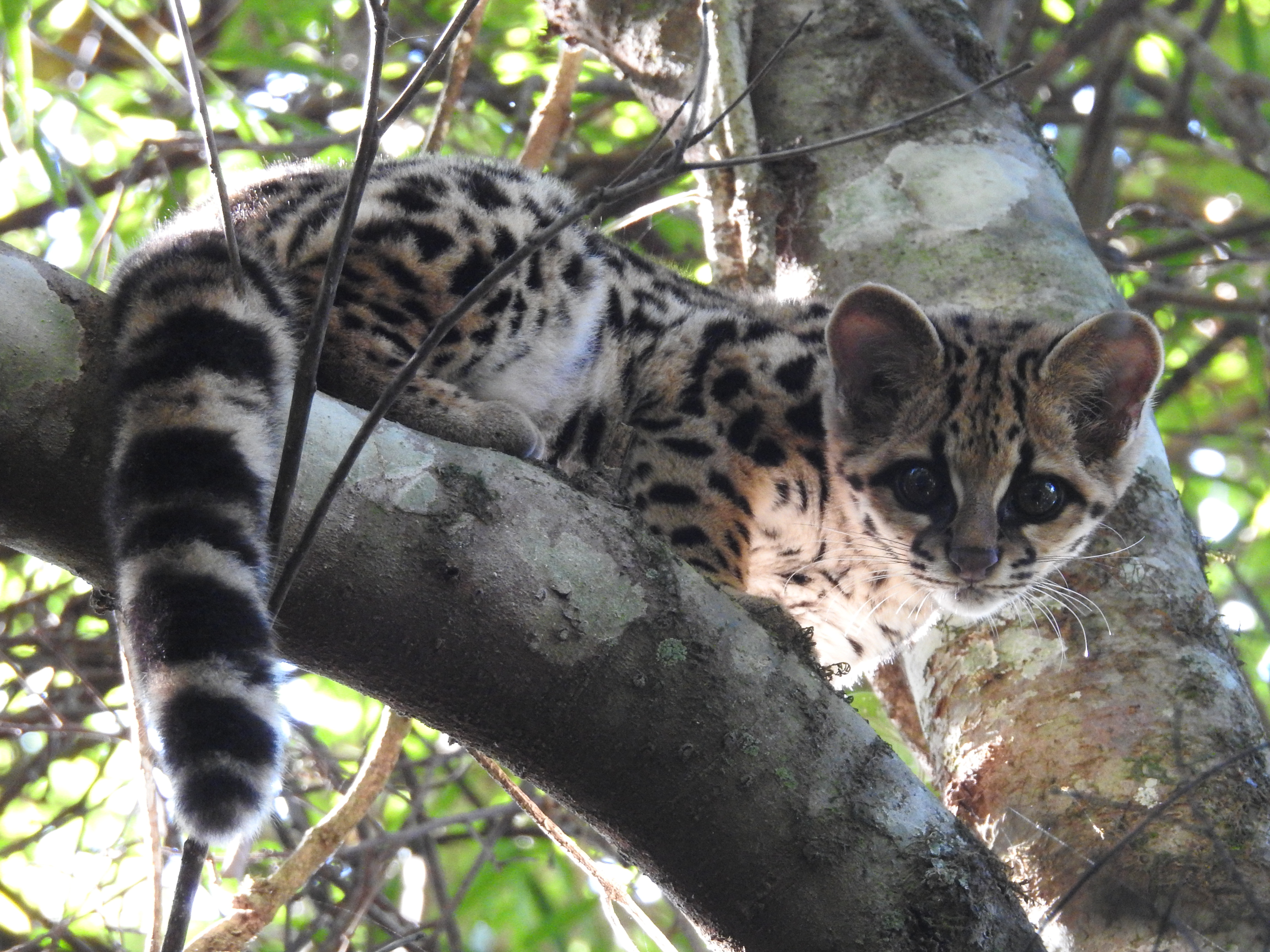
Margay photographed in Turvo State Park

The park is in the Basaltic Laval Plateau of the Paraná River Basin. Altitudes are from 100 to 400 metres (330 to 1,310 ft) above sea level. The terrain has steep slopes that drain into valleys that open to the north and west. The soil is clayey, dark red, shallow, fast-draining and very susceptible to erosion. The Köppen climate classification is "Cfa": subtropical temperate humid, with frequent fogs, average annual rainfall up to 1,900 millimetres (75 in) and average daily temperatures from 6.6 to 37.4 °C (43.9 to 99.3 °F).

The Turvo State Park has the last large area of Upper Uruguay forest in the state, with over 700 plant species. The original forest is elsewhere largely replaced with soy and wheat monocultures. The forest typically has an upper statrum of mainly deciduous trees that lose their leaves in winter. The canopy has an average height of 20 metres (66 ft) and emergent individuals of 30 metres (98 ft). Below this is a stratum of dense perennial trees from 10 to 20 metres (33 to 66 ft) tall that retain their leaves in winter. Below this are saplings, shrubs and grasses.

Important tree species include Sorocea bonplandii (cincho), Ocotea diospyrifolia (canela), Cabralea canjerana (canjerana), Tetrochidium rubrevinium (embirão) and Apuléia leiocarpa (grápia). Other trees include guatambu (Aspidosperma parviflorum) and canafístula (Cassia fistula). There are also rocky outcrops covered by lichens, mosses and herbs such as petunia and verbena. The rocky formations on the banks of the Uruguay River are adapted to periods of flooding followed by dry, sunny periods. The endemic bromeliad Dickia brevifolia is found in a few places on the river banks and is at risk of extinction.

There are almost 290 species of birds and more than 30 species of medium and large mammals. Many of the species are rare, and some are regionally or globally threatened. Fauna include cougar (Puma concolor), collared peccary (Pecari tajacu), South American tapir (Tapirus terrestris), deer, ocelot (Leopardus pardalis), southern tamandua (Tamandua tetradactyla), tayra (Eira barbara), capybara (Hydrochoerus hydrochaeris), howler monkey and otter. There are a variety of amphibians and reptiles and many types of insect. Studies of amphibians along the Garcia and Yucumã trails in 2003–05 found species that are often associated with crops, indicating influence by the nearby farmland.

== Yucumã Falls ==
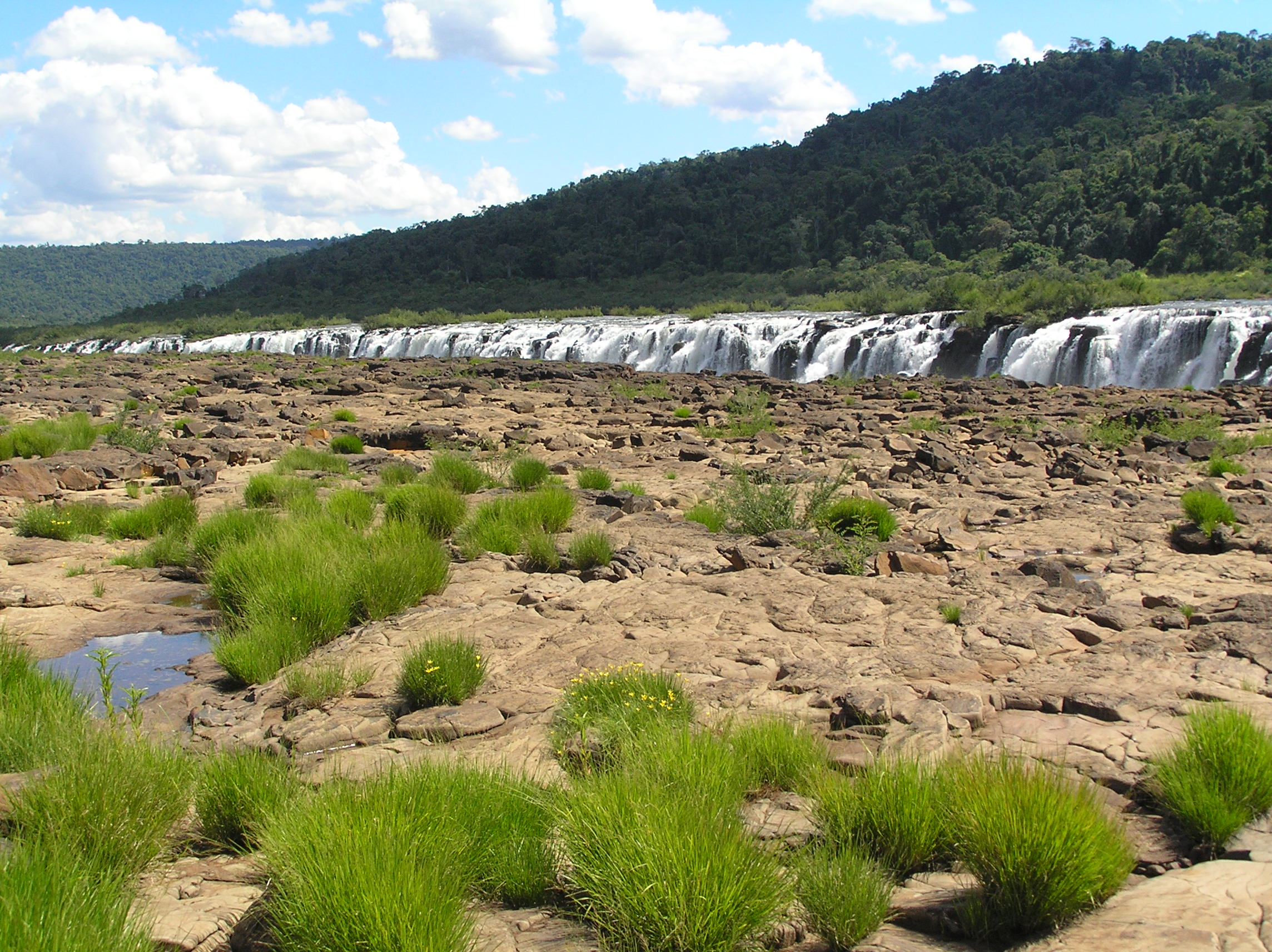
Shoreline of the falls

The Yucumã (or Moconá) falls are the second widest in the world after the 2,682-metre (8,799 ft) Iguazu Falls, if falls divided by islands are excluded. They are best viewed from the Brazilian side. They are formed by a trench or submerged canyon that runs along the bed of the Uruguay River. The deep and narrow canyon formed during the last glacial period at a time when the climate was drier and the river was not as wide. It is now no longer visible along most of the river, although the strong current has kept it clear of sediments.

The trench is visible at the Yucumã Falls, where the river flows along the edge of the trench and spills into it. In this section of about 1,800 metres (5,900 ft) the trench has with an average width of 30 metres (98 ft) and depth estimated at 90 to 120 metres (300 to 390 ft). The river waters spill into the trench along its entire length, with a drop of 12 to 15 metres (39 to 49 ft). From the visitor's area there is a 600-metre (2,000 ft) path to the river. Visitors may walk along the rocky stretch opposite the falls between the forest edge and the river bank.

The waterfalls are best viewed in the dry season between November and March or April. At other times the flood waters submerge the falls. They may be threatened by the planned Garabí-Panambi Hydroelectric Complex. However, Electrobras has stated that flooding in Turvo could only occur during the river's flood periods.

== Sources ==
- Araújo Corte, Dione Angélica de; Valladares-Pádua, Cláudio Benedito (November 2007), Plano de Manejo da Estação Ecológica Mico-Leão-Preto (PDF) (in Portuguese), Brasília: ICMBio
- Cigana, Caio (29 March 2014), "Ambientalistas cerram fileiras contrárias aos novos aproveitamentos hidrelétricos do Rio Uruguai", Zero Hora (in Portuguese)
- Cigana, Caio (27 January 2015), "Justiça paralisa processo de licenciamento ambiental da Usina hidrelétrica de Panambi", Zero Hora (in Portuguese)
- Gatis Pavils (2012-02-15), "Moconá Falls (Yucumã Falls)", Wondermondo
- "Parque Estadual do Turvo", Dicas de Passeios (in Portuguese)
- "Parque Estadual do Turvo emite aviso a visitantes", Três Passos News (in Portuguese), 9 November 2016
- Parque Estadual do Turvo (in Portuguese), SEMA: Secretaria do Ambiente e Desenvolvimento Sustentável do Rio Grande do Sul, 19 September 2010, archived from the original on 12 November 2016
- Parque Florestal Estadual do Turvo (in Portuguese), Derrubadas municipality
- Parque do Turvo (in Portuguese), Municipio de Derrubadas
- PES do Turvo (in Portuguese), ISA: Instituto Socioambiental
- Schmidt, Letícia Santos; Barcellos, Aline (2007), "Abundância e riqueza de espécies de Heteroptera (Hemiptera) do Parque Estadual do Turvo, sul do Brasil: Pentatomoidea", Iheringia. Série Zoologia (in Portuguese), 97 (1): 73–79, doi:10.1590/S0073-47212007000100011
- TRF4 mantém suspenso licenciamento de Hidrelétrica Panambi (in Portuguese), Tribunal Regional Federal da 4a Região, 4 May 2015
