= Novo Machado =

Municipality in Rio Grande do Sul, Brazil

Coordinates: 27°34′26″S 54°30′18″W

- Municipality
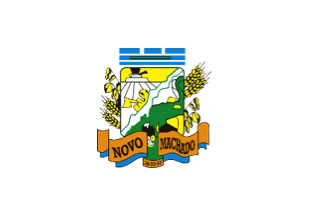
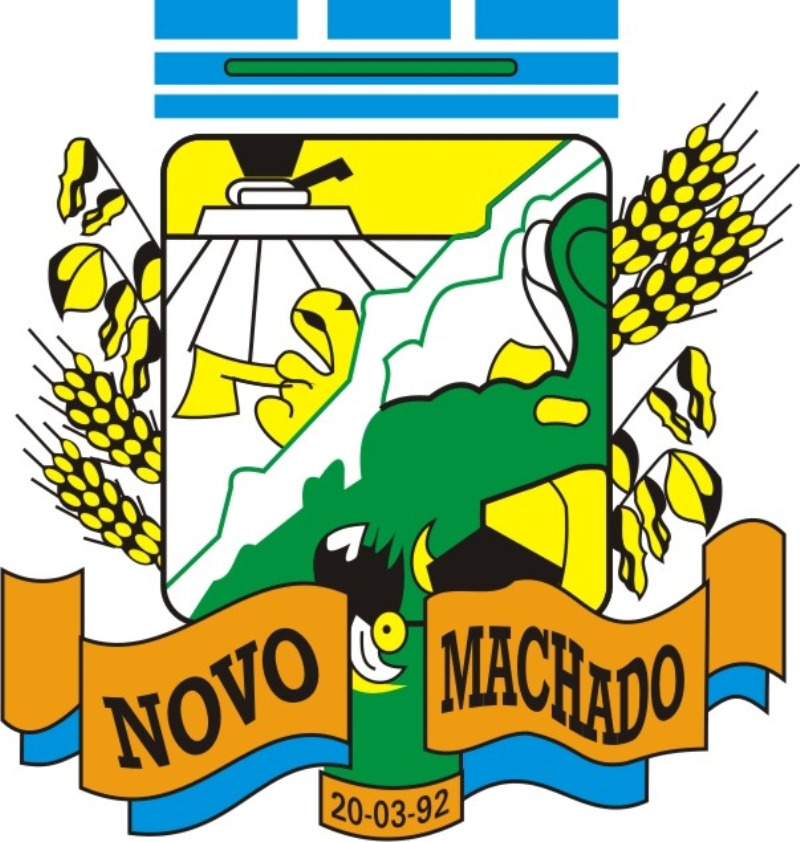
- Flag Coat of arms
- Interactive map of Novo Machado
- Country: Brazil
- Time zone: UTC−3 (BRT)

Novo Machado is a municipality in the state of Rio Grande do Sul, Brazil. As of 2020, the estimated population was 3,256.

The municipality would be partially flooded by the proposed Panambi Dam.

== See also ==
- List of municipalities in Rio Grande do Sul
