= Panambí Dam =

Planned dam in Argentina and Brazil

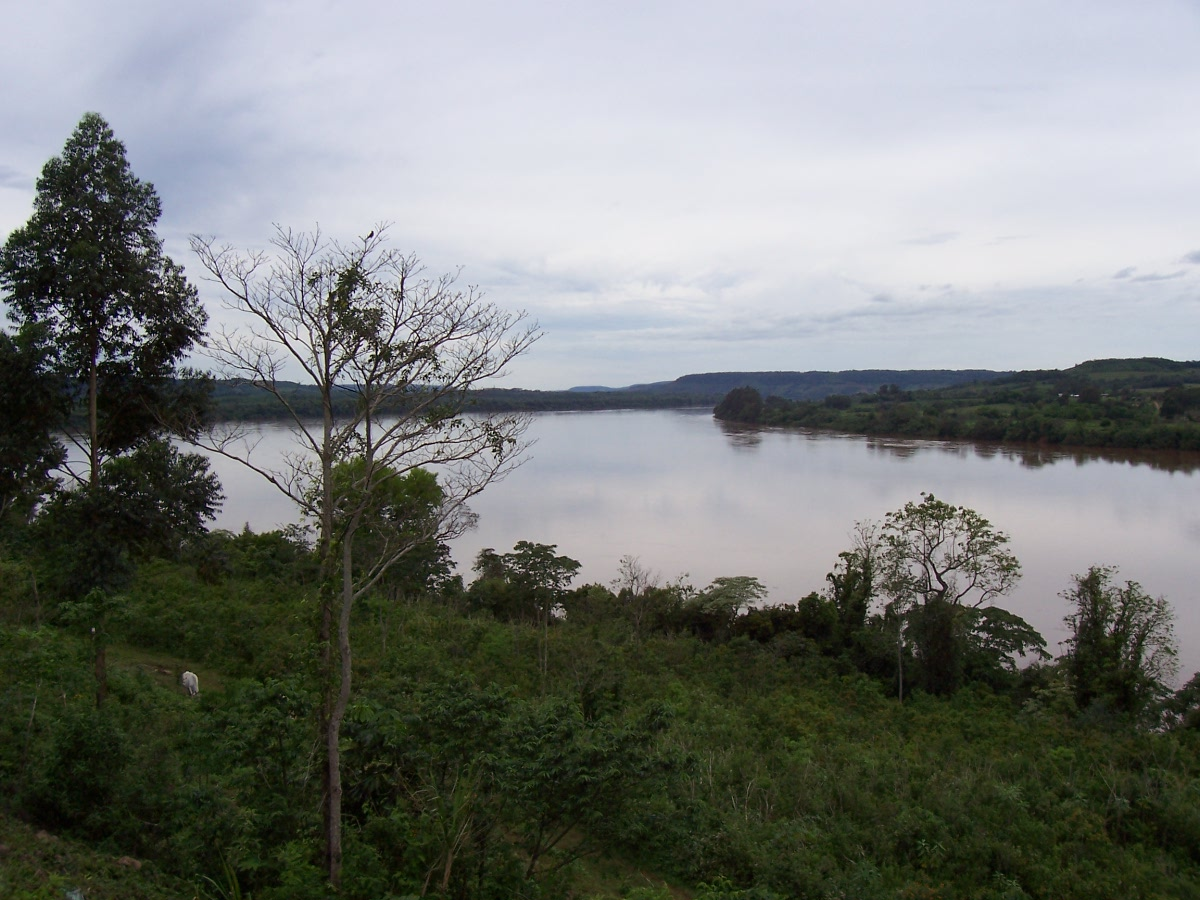
- Uruguay River at Panambí

- Location within Brazil
- Official name: Represa de Panambí
- Country: Argentina, Brazil
- Coordinates: 27.651002°S 54.904558°W
- Purpose: Hydroelectric
- Status: Planned

Dam and spillways
- Height (thalweg): 40 metres (130 ft)
- Length: 1,000 metres (3,300 ft)

Reservoir
- Surface area: 327 square kilometres (126 sq mi)
- Normal elevation: 130 metres (430 ft)

Power Station
- Turbines: 7 Kaplan
- Installed capacity: 1,048 MW
- Capacity factor: 0.60
- Annual generation: 5,474 GWh

The Panambí Dam (Portuguese: Represa de Panambí), or Roncador Dam, is a planned hydroelectric dam and generating station on the Uruguay River between Argentina and Brazil, part of the Garabí-Panambi Hydroelectric Complex. There is controversy over the environmental impact on the fast-flowing river.

== Location ==
The Panambí Dam would be built in the Misiones province of Argentina, and the Alecrim municipality of Rio Grande do Sul in Brazil. The exact location would depend on the results of geological studies of the sites. The Panambí Dam would be about 9 kilometres (5.6 mi) upstream from Porto Vera Cruz in Brazil and Panambi in Argentina, and in Brazil its reservoir would cover parts of the municipalities of Alecrim, Doutor Maurício Cardoso, Novo Machado, Porto Mauá, Santo Cristo, Tucunduva, Tuparendi, Crissiumal, Derrubadas, Esperança do Sul and Tiradentes do Sul.

== Technical ==
The project is a joint venture of Eletrobras of Brazil and Emprendimientos Energéticos Binacionales (Ebisa) of Argentina. The Panambi plant is scheduled to be built near Alecrim for US$2.74 billion. The Panambi dam would be about 40 metres (130 ft) high and 1,000 metres (3,300 ft) long. The reservoir would cover 327 square kilometres (126 sq mi). The reservoir elevation would be 130 metres (430 ft) above sea level. The power plant would have 7 Kaplan turbines, with an installed capacity of 1,048 MW and average annual generation of 5,474 GWh.

A biologist has argued that the nature of the river would be transformed from a fast-moving river with rapids to standing water, affecting the ability of fish to reproduce. Eletrobras has guaranteed that the Yucumã Falls, the largest longitudinal waterfall in the world, and the Turvo State Park would be preserved, but there was fear that 10% would be flooded by the Panambi reservoir. Electrobras has stated that flooding in Turvo could only occur during flood periods.

== Planning and approval process ==
Transnational projects on the Uruguay River have a long history. In a convention between Argentina and Brazil signed on 14 March 1972 three sites were selected: Roncador, or Panambi, with 2,700MW, Garabí with 1,800MW and San Pedro with 1,700MW. Arguments in favor of the projects were that they would support development of the local and regional economies, would help make the two countries independent of external energy suppliers using a renewable resource, and would avoid using hard currency resources. In 2003 the Garabí Dam was still on hold, as was the Roncador/Panambi dam. The Roncador Dam was to be near Puerto Panamibí, Oberá Department in Misiones.

Brazil and Argentina signed an agreement in 2005 for two possible dams, the Garabí Dam with 1,150MW and the Panambi Dam with 1,050MW. Eletrobras and EBISA were to undertake the project, expected to be completed by 2013, although it had met some local opposition. In February 2014 the Brazilian Institute of Environment and Renewable Natural Resources (IBAMA) approved the terms of reference for rescuing the fauna. The survey was to start in April 2014.

At the request of the Federal Public Ministry, in January 2015 a federal judge granted a preliminary injunction to stop the environmental licensing process for the Panambi plant. The main issue was that the reservoir would flood 60 hectares (150 acres) of the Turvo State Park, which holds regionally threatened flora and fauna, some at risk of extinction. The park is listed as a cultural and natural heritage property of the state, and is considered a priority area for biodiversity conservation. IBAMA's terms of reference for licensing did not conform to the park's legislation and was not approved by the state secretariat of the environment (SEMA). The Garabi plant was not affected by the ruling.

In April 2015 the regional federal tribunal upheld the suspension, since IBAMA's Environmental Impact Study would have been "flagrantly illegal". The rapporteur of the case noted a comment by the ecologist José Lutzenberger in the 1980s when entrepreneurs wanted to "rectify" curves on the Paraná River to allow passage of huge barges. He said, "Brazil is the only country in the world where rivers have to adapt to the size of vessels and not the size of vessels to the natural course of the river!". The rapporteur said, "The situation under consideration is analogous: the Turvo National Park is expected to adapt to the hydroelectric project, not the opposite ...".

In May 2015 Joaquín Olivera, provincial deputy for Misiones and former mayor of Panambí, said the feasibility studies were continuing and should be completed in 2016. He said the socio-environmental impact had been minimised and the project would avoid affecting the Moconá Falls. He acknowledged that there would be negative impacts, including flooding and changes to the natural course of the river, but pointed out that all the municipalities in the province would benefit. He said that where they could now build one school, after the mega-project they could build three. The Terms of Reference for the Panambi Dam was renewed on 16 December 2015 and the study was expected to be completed by the end of 2016.

== Sources ==
- "Brasil y Argentina acordaron priorizar la concreción de la represa Garabí", El Territorio (in Spanish), 21 November 2007
- Caubet, Christian G. (1995-01-01), "Grands Barrages Internationaux: Aspects du Droit de la Cooperation dans le Bassin de la Plata", Barrages internationaux et coopération (in French), KARTHALA Editions, ISBN 978-2-86537-587-5
- Cigana, Caio (29 March 2014), "Ambientalistas cerram fileiras contrárias aos novos aproveitamentos hidrelétricos do Rio Uruguai", Zero Hora (in Portuguese), Grupo RBS
- Cigana, Caio (27 January 2015), "Justiça paralisa processo de licenciamento ambiental da Usina hidrelétrica de Panambi", Zero Hora (in Portuguese), Grupo RBS
- Construcción de la Planta Hidroeléctrica de Panambí (in Spanish), IIRSA
- Eletrobras apresenta Garabi-Panambi a prefeitos (in Portuguese), Eletrobras CGTEE, 7 April 2014
- Enerdata (2011), Brazilian Energy Report, Enerdata, GGKEY:XK288JCZUJF
- Leal, Carlos Galindo; Câmara, Ibsen de Gusmão (2003), The Atlantic Forest of South America: Biodiversity Status, Threats, and Outlook, Island Press, ISBN 978-1-55963-989-7
- "Represa Garabí-Panambí: "Estamos en la última etapa de los estudios de factibilidad", dijo Joaquín Olivera", Misiones OnLine (in Spanish), 27 May 2015
- TRF4 mantém suspenso licenciamento de Hidrelétrica Panambi (in Portuguese), Tribunal Regional Federal da 4a Região, 4 May 2015
