= Doutor Maurício Cardoso =

Municipality in Rio Grande do Sul, Brazil

Coordinates: 27°30′S 54°22′W

- Municipality
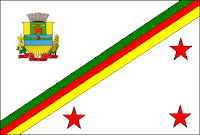
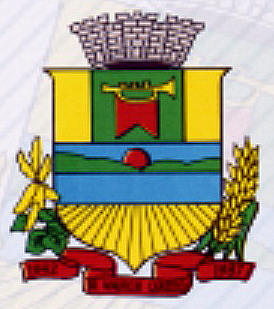
- Flag Coat of arms
- Motto: "Um Novo Tempo"
- Location of Doutor Maurício Cardoso in Rio Grande do Sul
- Country: Brazil
- Region: South
- State: Rio Grande do Sul
- Mesoregion: Noroeste Rio-Grandense
- Microregion: Três Passos
- Founded: 8 December 1987

Government
  - Mayor: Marino José Pollo (PP, 2021 - 2024)

Area
  - Total: 255.731 km^{2} (98.738 sq mi)

Population (2021)
  - Total: 4,380
  - Density: 17.1/km^{2} (44.4/sq mi)
- Demonym: Mauriciense
- Time zone: UTC−3 (BRT)
- Website: Official website

Doutor Maurício Cardoso is a municipality in the state of Rio Grande do Sul, Brazil. As of 2020, the estimated population was 4,462.

The municipality would be partially flooded by the proposed Panambi Dam.

== See also ==
- List of municipalities in Rio Grande do Sul
