= Esperança do Sul =

Municipality of Rio Grande do Sul, Brazil

Coordinates: 27°21′18″S 53°59′31″W

- Municipality
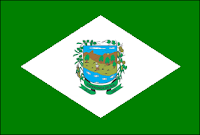
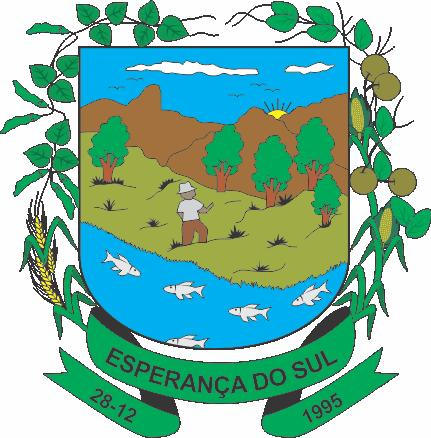
- Flag Coat of arms

- Location of Esperança do Sul in Rio Grande do Sul
- Country: Brazil
- Region: South
- State: Rio Grande do Sul
- Mesoregion: Noroeste Rio-Grandense
- Microregion: Três Passos
- Founded: 28 December 1995

Government
  - Mayor: Moisés Alfredo Ledur (MDB, 2021 - 2024)

Area
  - Total: 148.909 km^{2} (57.494 sq mi)

Population (2021)
  - Total: 2,846
  - Density: 19.11/km^{2} (49.50/sq mi)
- Demonym: Esperançulence
- Time zone: UTC−3 (BRT)
- Website: Official website

Esperança do Sul is a municipality in the state of Rio Grande do Sul, Brazil. As of 2020, the estimated population was 2,885.

The municipality would be partially flooded by the proposed Panambi Dam.

== See also ==
- List of municipalities in Rio Grande do Sul
