= Porto Mauá =

Municipality in Rio Grande do Sul, Brazil

Coordinates: 27°35′S 54°40′W

- Municipality
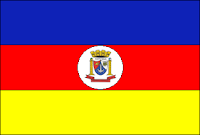
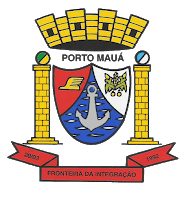
- Flag Coat of arms
- Interactive map of Porto Mauá
- Country: Brazil
- Time zone: UTC−3 (BRT)

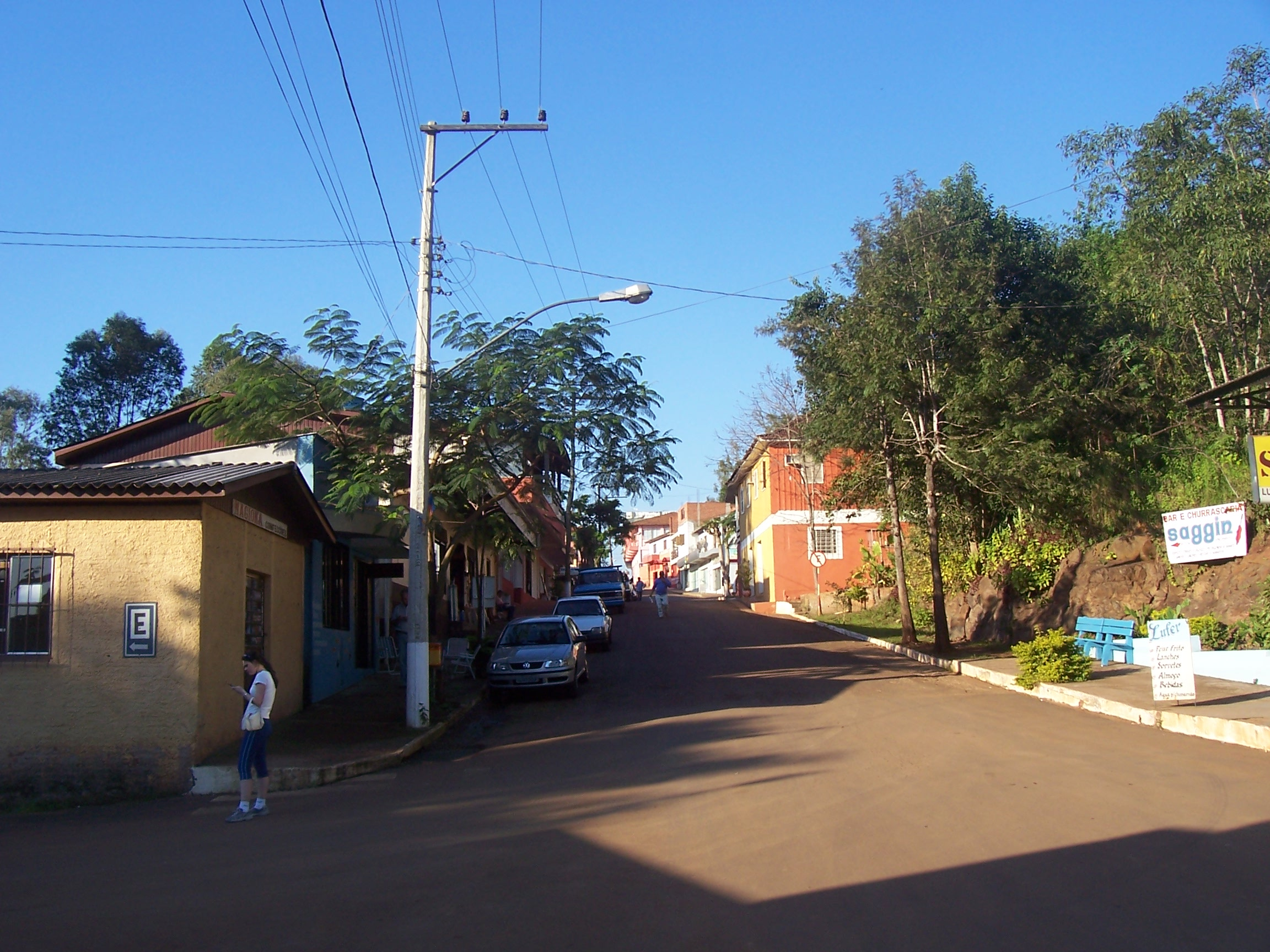
Street of Porto Mauá municipality, in the state of Rio Grande do Sul, Brazil.

Porto Mauá is a municipality in the state of Rio Grande do Sul, Brazil. As of 2020, the estimated population was 2,352.

The municipality would be partially flooded by the proposed Panambí Dam.

== See also ==
- List of municipalities in Rio Grande do Sul
