= Palmeira do Piauí =

Coordinates: 8.72694°S 44.2358°W

- Municipality
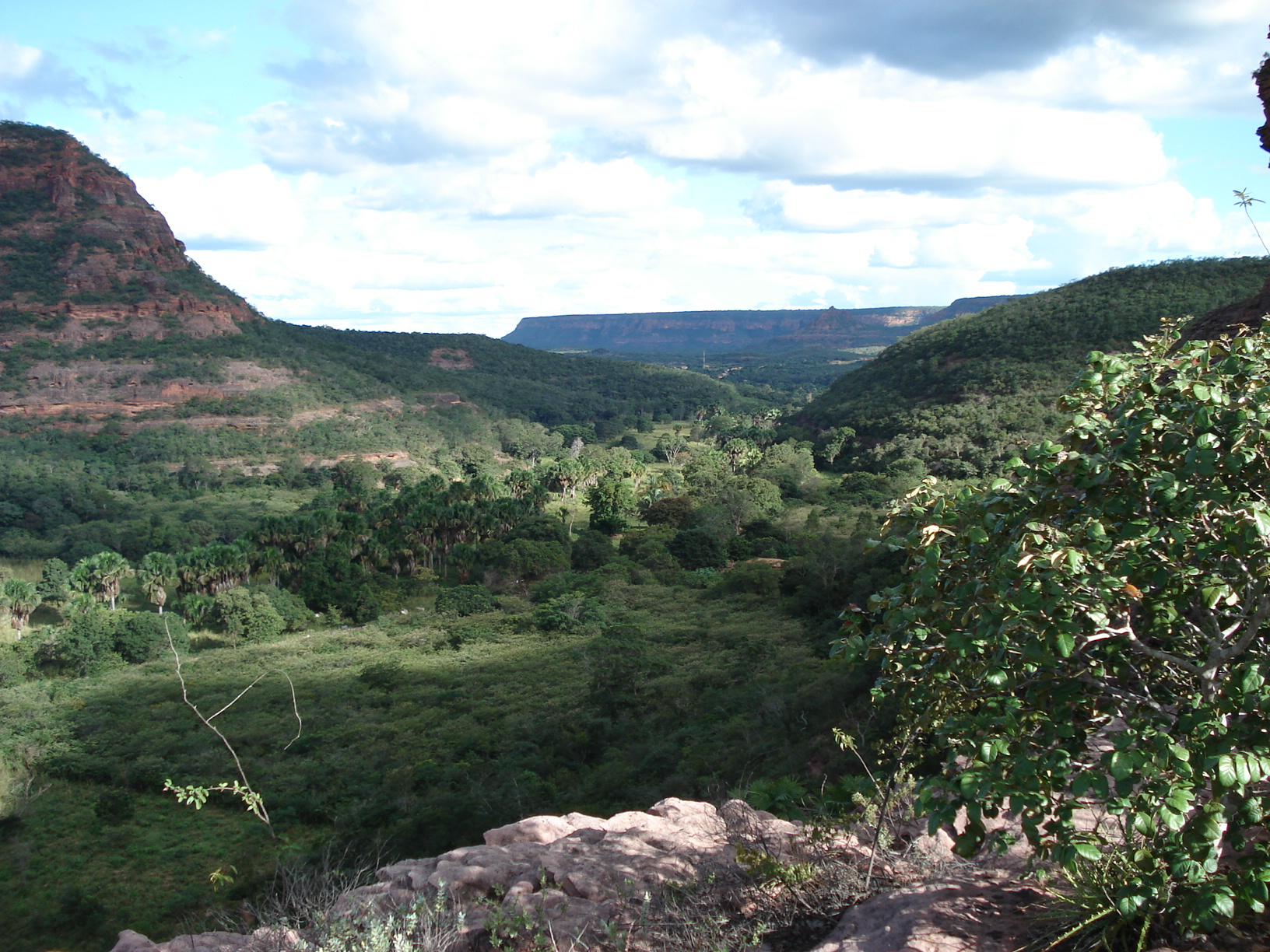

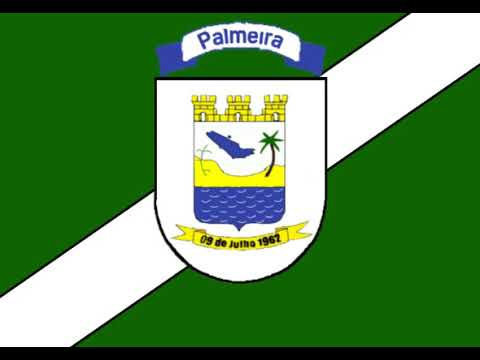
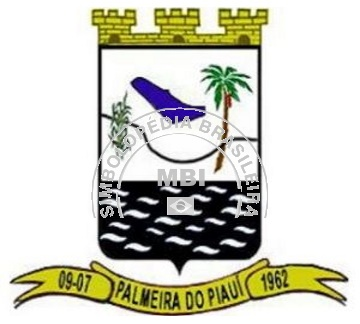
- Flag Coat of arms

- Country: Brazil
- Region: Nordeste
- State: Piauí
- Mesoregion: Sudoeste Piauiense

Population (2020)
  - Total: 5,036
- Time zone: UTC−3 (BRT)

Palmeira do Piauí is a municipality in the state of Piauí in the Northeast region of Brazil.

== Notable people ==
- Whindersson Nunes — YouTuber

== See also ==
- List of municipalities in Piauí
