= Luísa Sonza =

Brazilian singer-songwriter (born 1998)

- Sonza in 2026
- Born: Luísa Gerloff Sonza; 18 July 1998 (age 28); Tuparendi, Rio Grande do Sul, Brazil
- Occupations: Singer; songwriter
- Years active: 2017–present
- Spouse: Whindersson Nunes (m. 2018; div. 2020)
- Musical career
- Genres: Pop; urbano; Brazilian funk; bossa nova
- Instruments: Vocals; guitar
- Labels: Universal Music; Sony Music

Luísa Gerloff Sonza (Brazilian Portuguese: [luˈizɐ ʒeʁˈlɔfi ˈsõzɐ]; Italian: [sontsa]; born 18 July 1998) is a Brazilian singer-songwriter. She rose to prominence in 2016 after posting cover songs on her YouTube channel. After signing with Universal Music Group in 2017, she released her debut album, Pandora, in the following year. Her second album, Doce 22, was released in 2021. The year also saw her being featured on a remix of Katy Perry's "Cry About It Later", along with Bruno Martini. In 2023, she released her third studio album, Escândalo Íntimo, which features a collaboration with Demi Lovato on the song "Penhasco2". Sonza has appeared as an actress on several television shows, and with Pabllo Vittar she co-hosts the HBO Max show Queen Stars.

== Career ==
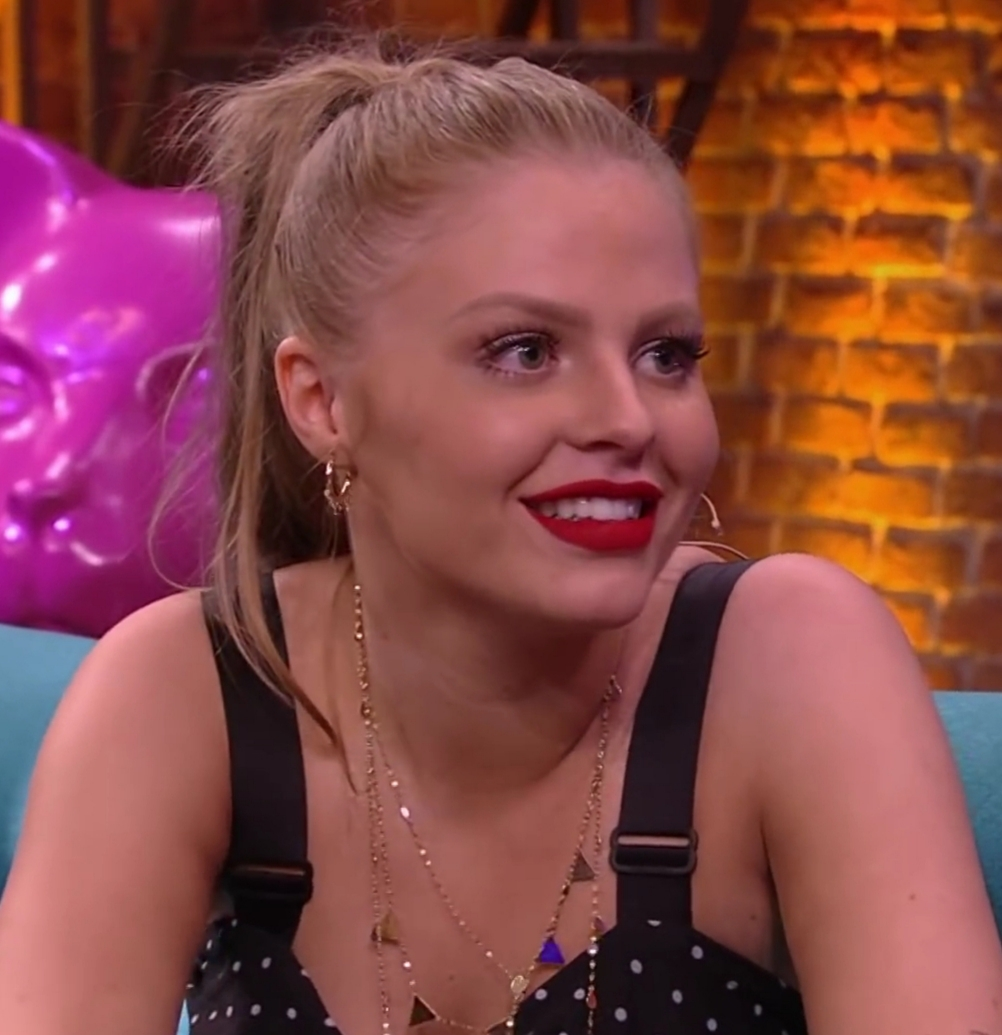
Sonza in 2018

Sonza began singing at a Gaucho folklore community centre in her hometown at the age of seven. She was hired as a child singer by music group Sol Maior, staying with them for 10 years. Sonza would appear in a total of up to 24 concerts a month, with approximately 5,000 attending each time. In 2014, she launched a cover song YouTube channel, which made her gain online visibility. She became known then as 'Queen of Covers'.

Sonza signed with Universal Music in May 2017, with her first single, Good Vibes, being then released. In July, she released her second single, Olhos Castanhos (Brown Eyes), a song she wrote for then-husband Whindersson Nunes. In October the same year, she released her first, self-titled EP with track Não Preciso de Você Pra Nada (I Don't Need You For Anything) featuring Brazilian singer Luan Santana.

In January 2018, Sonza released the song Rebolar (To Twerk) from her first EP as a single. The video peaked 1st on YouTube. In March, Rebolar (Remix) with 5 remix tracks of the song was released as an EP.

In June 2018, Sonza made a special guest appearance in an episode of Brazilian TV sitcom Dra. Darci (Dr Darci), in which she played Julinha. In July, she released Devagarinho (Slowly), which made it to Spotify's Brazil Top 50 chart.

In October 2018, Sonza was invited by soap opera writer Aguinaldo Silva to record Nunca Foi Sorte (It Was Never by Chance), a song written by Silva, for the soundtrack of TV Globo's telenovela O Sétimo Guardião. She also made a special guest appearance in one of the episodes. Later that year, Sonza released the song as a single and music video.

In November 2018, Sonza released the single Boa menina (Good Girl). In February 2019, a forró version of the song was used in a video featuring Whindersson Nunes. In March 2019, she released Pior Que Possa Imaginar (Worse Than You Can Imagine). Later that year, Sonza released her first album, Pandora.

=== 2020–present: Doce 22 and Escândalo Íntimo ===
In June 2020, Sonza gave a performance in the online version of the NYC Pride March.

In June 2021, Sonza announced a career break after attacks received on social media. Next month, she returned to the networks to announce the release of her second studio album, Doce 22, which was released on 18 July, the day she turned 23. The songs "VIP" and "Melhor Sozinha" were released as singles on the same day. The track "Também Não Sei de Nada", featuring Lulu Santos, was made available as a single at the time of the album's release. To promote the album, the artist appeared on the program Prazer, Sonza, aired on Multishow in five episodes from 7 July 2021. In May 2022, it was announced that Sonza had signed a recording contract with Sony Music Brazil, valued at US$20 million (about R$100 million at the time), with the aim of investing in an international career.

In a press conference, held on 18 July 2022, Sonza announced the production of her third studio album, to address a more mature and sober version of her life, for the year 2023. On 11 April, Netflix Brazil announced the recording of a documentary series, with Sonza, which will present her trajectory and personal life along with the background of her new project. On 9 August, the singer's social networks confirmed the release of her new album, entitled Escândalo Íntimo, for the 29th of the same month.

On 6 September in 2024, Sonza sang the Brazilian National Anthem before the NFL International Series game between the Philadelphia Eagles and Green Bay Packers in São Paulo.

== Personal life ==
In August 2016, YouTuber Whindersson Nunes asked Sonza to be his girlfriend. In March 2017, they got engaged. In February 2018, they married in a civil and religious ceremony for 350 guests in Alagoas, Brazil.

On 29 April 2020, through a post on Instagram, Whinderson announced his divorce, claiming that Sonza and he had grown apart but remain good friends.

In an interview, Sonza said she is too conscious of her own body to have biological children, and intends to adopt instead.

Sonza is of Italian and German descent. She is openly bisexual.

=== Views on women's empowerment and toxic masculinity ===
Mattea Sonza received criticism alleging she had married for money and responded by saying she made as much money as her former husband Whindersson Nunes did. She once thought being a victim of machismo was a woman's fault, but realised no matter what she did, she would be a victim anyway. 'I had two options: either understand a sick social structure, or become sick myself'; 'They're using the structure to talk about women, to place them in an undeserving position, of being less smart, and incomplete without a man—just like they did to my mum, my grandma, my aunt', she said. She holds no hard feelings towards trolls harassing her online. 'Before deconstructing other people, I have to deconstruct myself'. As to marriage, Sonza states: 'It is not women's duty to do anything, or be anything. It is not our duty to be a mother, or get married. Unless you want to, I'm against women letting go of their dreams to fulfil someone else's dreams.'

In September 2020, after protests by Anitta and Sonza, Oxford Languages decided to reassess the definitions of Portuguese words patroa ('owner' or 'boss', in the feminine gender), professora ('teacher', in the feminine gender) and mulher solteira ('single woman') appearing in Google's definitional search, which until then were related to misogynistic definitions such as 'housewife' (patroa) and 'prostitute' (professora and mulher solteira). Both Google and Oxford Languages issued press releases stating that they would either revise the definitions or remove the item if it 'no longer reflected the modern usage of Portuguese language by Brazilian speakers.'

=== Legal dispute ===
In 2020, Sonza was sued for moral damages and accused of racism by lawyer Isabel Macedo de Jesus. The lawsuit concerned an incident on 22 September 2018, when Macedo was celebrating her birthday at a restaurant in Fernando de Noronha, where a gastronomy festival attended by Sonza also took place. At one point, Macedo passed by Sonza on her way to the bathroom; according to the case file, Sonza mistook her for a waitress and slapped her arm, ordering her to bring a glass of water "in a harsh tone". Macedo, who is black, asked Sonza to repeat herself and why she believed her to be a waitress. In response, Sonza repeated herself with the same "harsh tone" and dodged the question. In the suit, Macedo requested compensatory damages of R$10,000 along with a public retraction and "the placement of informative posters about the prohibition of racist practices" inside the restaurant. Sonza denied the charges, calling the allegations "absurd" and telling people not to believe the story.

The case gained renewed attention in September 2022 when presenter Danilo Gentili accused the press and gossip sites of respectively purposely ignoring and defending the event. A month later, on 5 October 2022, Sonza publicly apologized to Macedo and those who felt offended by the case: "The way I addressed Mrs. Isabel translated into an act of reproduction of structural racism, which was in no way my intention". In addition, she said she would accept Macedo's requests and would seek to reach an agreement with her.

== Discography ==
=== Solo albums ===
- Pandora (2019)
- Doce 22 (2021)
- Escândalo Íntimo (2023)
- Brutal Paraíso (2026)

=== Collaborative albums ===
- Bossa Sempre Nova (with Roberto Menescal and Toquinho) (2026)

== Filmography ==
=== Television ===
Year	Title	Role	Notes	Ref.
2018	Dra. Darci	Julinha	Episode: "Menina Gênio"	
2019	Os Roni	Rosinha	Episode: "O Show Tem Que Continuar"	
2019	Dança dos Famosos	Contestant (6th place)	Season 16	
2020	Amor de Mãe	Mel	Episode: "29 de janeiro de 2020"	
2020	Anitta: Made in Honório	Herself		
2021	Prazer, Luísa	Host		
2022	The Masked Singer Brasil	Guest judge	Season 2	
2022	Queen Stars Brasil	Host		
2023	If I Were Luísa Sonza	Herself	Documentary	
2024	The Masked Singer Brasil	Contestant	Season 4	

=== Internet ===
Year	Title	Role	Plataform
2021	Doce 22 (Making Off)	Herself	YouTube
2022	Mini Doc: Doce 22	Herself	YouTube
2024	Escândalo Íntimo - O Filme	Herself	YouTube

=== Music video ===
Year	Title	Artist	Ref.
2018	"Paga de Solteiro Feliz"	Simone & Simaria, Alok	
2019	"Mi Persona Favorita"	Alejandro Sanz, Camila Cabello	
2020	"Contigo"	Danna Paola	
2021	"Ni Una Más"	Aitana	

== Awards and nominations ==
Year	Award	Category	Nomination	Result	Ref.
2017	Multishow Brazilian Music Awards	Best Web Cover	Luísa Sonza	Won	
2017	Meus Prêmios Nick	Favorite Music Channel	Luísa Sonza	Nominated	
2018	MTV MIAW Awards Brazil	Selfie Of the Year	Júlio Cocielo FT. Whindersson FT. Tata FT. Luisa Sonza	Won	
2018	Meus Prêmios Nick	Shipp Of the Year	Whindersson Nunes and Luísa Sonza	Nominated	
2018	Prêmio Jovem Brasileiro	Covers	Luísa Sonza	Nominated	
2018	WME Awards	Revelation of the Year	Luísa Sonza	Won	
2018	Prêmio Contigo! Online	Musical Revelation	Luísa Sonza	Won	
2019	WME Awards	Best Popular Song	"Boa Menina"	Won	
2019	WME Awards	Best Music Video	"Garupa"	Nominated	
2019	MTV MIAW Awards Brazil	Musical Revelation	Luisa Sonza	Won	
2019	Prêmio Geração Glamour	Revelation Singer	Luisa Sonza	Won	
2019	Prêmio Jovem Brasileiro	Best Singer	Luisa Sonza	Nominated	
2020	Meus Prêmios Nick	Favorite Musical Artist	Luisa Sonza	Nominated	
2020	Meus Prêmios Nick	Style Of the Year	Luisa Sonza	Nominated	
2020	Prêmio Jovem Brasileiro	Best Singer	Luisa Sonza	Nominated	
2020	Prêmio Jovem Brasileiro	Hit Of the Year	"Combatchy"	Nominated	
2020	Prêmio Jovem Brasileiro	Best Feat	"Combatchy"	Won	
2020	MTV MIAW Awards Brazil	National Feat	"Combatchy"	Won	
2020	MTV MIAW Awards Brazil	National Feat	"Flores"	Nominated	
2020	MTV MIAW Awards Brazil	Anthem of the Year	"Braba"	Nominated	
2020	MTV MIAW Awards Brazil	Live of the Lives	Luísa Sonza	Nominated	
2020	MTV MIAW Awards Brazil	Musical Artist	Luísa Sonza	Nominated	
2020	Multishow Brazilian Music Awards	Best Singer	Luísa Sonza	Nominated	
2020	Multishow Brazilian Music Awards	Bubble Gum Music	"Braba"	Nominated	
2020	Multishow Brazilian Music Awards	Best TVZ Clip	"Combatchy"	Won	
2020	WME Awards	Best Live Musical	Luísa Sonza	Nominated	
2020	WME Awards	Best Singer	Luísa Sonza	Nominated	
2020	WME Awards	Best Music Video	"Combatchy"	Nominated	
2020	WME Awards	Best Music Video	"Braba"	Nominated	
2020	WME Awards	Best Mainstream Song	"Braba"	Won	
2020	Capricho Awards	National Hit	"Braba"	Nominated	
2020	Capricho Awards	Feat of the Year	"Flores"	Nominated	
2020	Capricho Awards	Musical Artist	Luísa Sonza	Nominated	
2021	Prêmio Rádio Globo Quem	Best Feat	"Não Vai Embora"	Won	
2021	Prêmio Rádio Globo Quem	Best Feat	"Combatchy"	Nominated	
2021	Prêmio Rádio Globo Quem	Best Feat	"Modo Turbo"	Nominated	
2021	Prêmio Rádio Globo Quem	Best Choreography	"Modo Turbo"	Won	
2021	Prêmio Rádio Globo Quem	Best National Pop Music	"Braba"	Nominated	
2021	Troféu Internet	Best Singer	Luísa Sonza	Pending	
