= Whindersson Nunes =

Brazilian YouTuber, comedian and singer (born 1995)

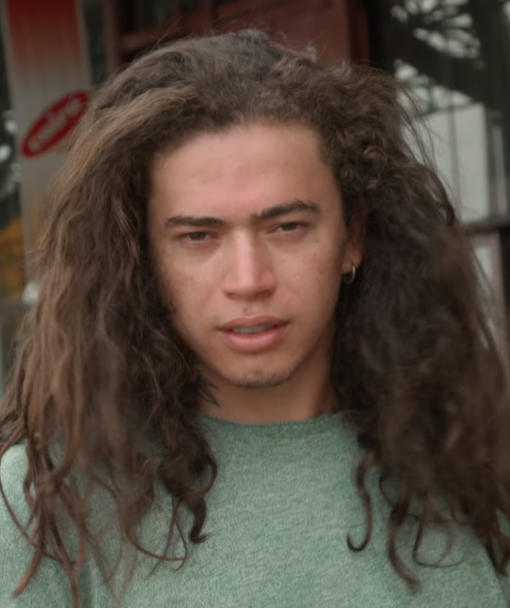
- Nunes in 2021
- Born: Whindersson Nunes Batista; 5 January 1995 (age 31); Palmeira do Piauí, Piauí, Brazil
- Occupations: YouTuber; actor; comedian; singer; songwriter; boxer
- Spouse: Luísa Sonza (m. 2018; div. 2020)

YouTube information
- Channel: whinderssonnunes
- Years active: 2013–present
- Genres: Entertainment; comedy; music
- Subscribers: 44.7 million
- Views: 4.71 billion
- Musical career
- Genres: Hip hop; pop; comedy music
- Years active: 2017–present
- Label: BMG
- Last updated: 21 October 2025
- Website: whindersson.com.br

Whindersson Nunes Batista (born 5 January 1995), also known musically as Lil Whind, is a Brazilian YouTuber, comedian, actor, musician and boxer. His YouTube channel became the most subscribed channel in Brazil, but it was eventually surpassed by Canal KondZilla.

Nunes registered his YouTube channel in 2013 and has since become the 59th most-subscribed channel on YouTube (excluding YouTube generated topics), with 44 million subscribers. He is the fourth most subscribed YouTube channel from Brazil.

Nunes made an uncredited cameo appearance in Ice Age: Collision Course as Roger. He has since appeared in multiple films and television series, most notably in the Os Parças as Ray Van.

Nunes won his amateur boxing debut against Mario Silva via unanimous decision on 28 September 2019. Nunes fought former WBO super featherweight champion Acelino Freitas on 30 January 2022 in an exhibition bout ending in a unanimous draw. Nunes entered the Kingpyn Boxing High Stakes Tournament and defeated Filipek via technical knockout on 22 April 2023 in the quarter-finals. Nunes lost to King Kenny via unanimous decision in the semi-finals on 15 July 2023.

== Personal life ==
Whindersson Nunes Batista was born in Palmeira do Piauí and grew up in Bom Jesus, Piauí. At the age of fifteen he decided that he wanted to make videos for YouTube. He did several attempts to get his channel recognized, but they were not successful. However, shortly thereafter he returned to producing videos for the channel, and the videos began to receive more views, and it was when he launched the parody Alô vó, tô reprovado in 2012, which within a week received five million views. Nunes then moved to Teresina. He had no place to live, but was invited by the YouTuber Bob Nunes to live with his (Bob's) family in a neighborhood in the northern part of the city. From there on the channel began to rise in popularity, however, on 20 January 2013, the channel was hacked and deleted. After that incident, Whindersson launched the channel for which he is known today, having already reached the milestone of more than 40 million subscribers.

== YouTube career ==
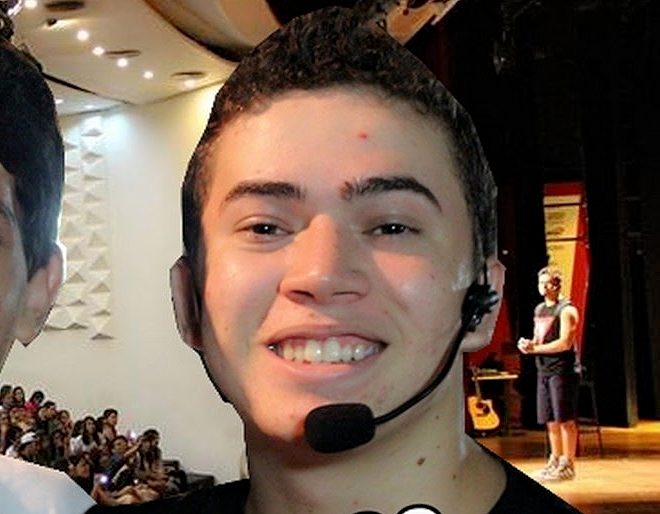
Nunes in 2014

The channel currently has around 42.3 million subscribers, over 3 billion views, and more than 380 videos. The channel has many types of content: from parodies, vlogs, songwriting to movie reviews. Its main marks are its simplistic editing, scenery and costumes used by Nunes, who almost always is shirtless in a messy room, without any type of editing besides cuts. He always starts his videos with the phrase: "Hey guys watching my channel, how are you?" He humorously portrays subjects of his day-to-day life and childhood. The channel is currently the second most influential YouTube channel, according to research by Snack Intelligence. The most watched video of the channel is the parody entitled WHAT IS THE WIFI PASSWORD – Parody Adele – Hello, that exceeds 69 million views.

Nunes also does acting and stand-up. He's in the cast of "Party Crashers 2" with Pc Siqueira, Júlio Cocielo and Maju Trindade as newcomers in the cast and the veterans are: Mariana Ximenes, Marcelo Adnet and Eduardo Sterblitch. Nunes is also in the cast called "Internet – The Movie", along with other famous YouTubers, among them: Kéfera Buchmann, Christian Figueiredo and Rafinha Bastos.

The channel hit 10 million subscribers on 14 July 2016, making it the second most subscribed channel in Brazil, behind only to Porta dos Fundos, later surpassing them to become the most subscribed channel of Brazil less than three months later. In the same year, Snack Intelligence, division of the channel Snack network on YouTube that monitors and analyzes the digital audiovisual market, determined Nunes was the second most influential YouTuber in the world, behind only Felix Arvid Ulf Kjellberg, popularly known as PewDiePie. In addition, a survey released by Google, made in partnership by Provokers and Meio & Mensagem consultants, revealed that Nunes is the second most influential Brazilian personality among 14- to 17-year-olds in Brazil, behind only Luciano Huck.

== Music career ==
Whindersson Nunes performs musically under the stage name Lil Whind. While his initial musical contributions were comedic parodies, he successfully transitioned into Trap music and Hip hop music as a serious artist.

In 2020, he released his debut studio album, Piauí, named after his home state. The album featured a blend of personal storytelling and regional influences, marking his official entry into the Brazilian trap scene. One of his most significant commercial successes is the single "Girassol", a collaboration with singer Priscilla Alcantara, which became a viral hit and received multiple certifications in Brazil.

In August 2022, Nunes released the EP Vivência through BMG. His music often explores themes of fame, social inequality, and his childhood experiences in Northeastern Brazil.

=== Discography ===
- Piauí (2020)
- Vivência (EP, 2022)

== Boxing career ==
On 28 September 2019, Nunes made his amateur boxing debut against Mario Silva in a boxing match for New Champion 2: Grandes Combates in Alphaville, São Paulo, Brazil. Nunes won his amateur bout via unanimous decision.

=== Exhibition bout with Popó Freitas ===
On 30 January 2022, Nunes fought WBO super featherweight champion Acelino Freitas in an exhibition bout at the Duo Art Ice, Alphaville in São Paulo, Brazil. The fight ended in a draw after Nunes suffered a horror cut but was able to cling on to hear the final bell after eight rounds.

=== High Stakes Tournament ===
On 7 March 2023, it was announced that Nunes had signed a multi fight deal with Kingpyn Boxing to compete in the High Stakes Tournament. On 12 March at the Kingpyn Launch Party, Nunes was matched up with Polish mixed martial arts fighter Filipek for the quarter final of the Kingpyn High Stakes Tournament at Wembley Arena in London, England on 22 April. Nunes won by technical knockout in the 2nd round.

After defeating Filipek, Nunes was matched up with British YouTuber King Kenny for the semi-finals round for the High Stakes Tournament after he defeated Thai YouTuber My Mate Nate. The bout took place on 15 July at the 3Arena in Dublin, Ireland. Nunes lost via unanimous decision.

On 24 August, Happy Punch Promotions revealed that Kingpyn Boxing has not paid some of their fighters and the company is unresponsive.

=== Professional career ===
==== Nunes vs Nate ====
On 13 September 2023, it was announced that Nunes would make his professional debut against Thai YouTuber My Mate Nate on 14 October, on the undercard of MF & DAZN: X Series 10 – The Prime Card at Manchester Arena in Manchester, England. On the night of the fight, Nunes was defeated by Nate via unanimous decision.

==== Nunes vs Goyat ====
On 21 May 2024, it was announced that Nunes would face Indian professional boxer and former WBC Asian welterweight champion Neeraj Goyat on the undercard of the Jake Paul vs. Mike Tyson Netflix event at AT&T Stadium in Arlington, Texas, US. Originally scheduled for 20 July, the event was postponed due to a personal health issue with Mike Tyson and took place on 15 November. Nunes lost to Goyat by unanimous decision.

== Filmography ==
=== Film ===
Year	Film	Role	Notes	Ref.
2016	Ice Age: Collision Course	Roger	Uncredited cameo	
2017	Internet – O Filme	Himself		
2017	Os Penetras 2 – Quem Dá Mais?	Himself		
2017	Os Parças	Ray Van		
2019	Whindersson Nunes: Adulto	Himself	Netflix comedy special	
2019	A Placa de Rubi – A Chibatada Final	Himself	Short film	
2019	Os Parças 2	Ray Van		
2020	Contos do Caçador de Sombras	Pu Songling	Voice	
2021	Detetive Madeinusa	Himself		
2022	Sexta Feira 12	Himself	Short film	

=== Television ===
Year(s)	Title	Role	Notes	Ref.
2018	Dra. Darci	Gerald	Episode: Pra Frente Brasil	
2018	Z4	Ele Mesmo	Main role	
2019–2021	Os Roni	Roniclayson	Main role	
2024	Os Parças	Ray Van	Main role	

=== Music videos ===
Year	Title	Artist(s)	Role	Ref.
2017	"Sua Cara"	Major Lazer featuring Anitta and Pabllo Vittar	Mãe	
2021	"Céu Aberto"	Marcelo Falcão with Hungria Hip Hop	Himself	

== Discography ==
=== Extended plays ===
Title	Details
Vivência	Released: 19 August 2022; Label: BMG; Formats: Digital download, streaming, CD

=== Singles ===
Title	Year
"Na Sua Cara" (featuring Kaio Oliveria)	2017
"En Vou Tu Vai" (with Tirullipa and GKay featuring Carlinhos Maia)	2019
"Girassol" (with Priscilla Alcantara)	2019
"Mais um dia normal"	2019
"Coisa Linda" (with Ivete Sangalo)	2020
"Hit Da Pão" (with Tirullipa and GKay featuring Rafael Cunha)	2020
"Paraíso" (with Luan Otten)	2020
"Midas"	2021
"Baião" (with Alok and Rapadura featuring Barbatuques)	2021
"Morena" (featuring João Gomes)	2021
"Alok"	2022
"Popó (Ao Vivo)" (with Matheus Fernandes)	2023
"Bora Bora"	2023
"Some" (with Tília)	2023

== Boxing record ==
=== Professional ===
1 fight	0 wins	1 loss
By decision	0	1

No.	Result	Record	Opponent	Type	Round, time	Date	Location	Notes
1	Loss	0–1	Neeraj Goyat	UD	6	15 Nov 2024	AT&T Stadium, Arlington, Texas, US	

=== MF–Professional ===
1 fight	0 wins	1 loss
By decision	0	1

No.	Result	Record	Opponent	Type	Round, time	Date	Location	Notes
1	Loss	0–1	My Mate Nate	UD	4	14 Oct 2023	Manchester Arena, Manchester, England	

=== Exhibition ===
4 fights	1 win	2 losses
By knockout	1	0
By decision	0	2
Draws	1	

No.	Result	Record	Opponent	Type	Round, time	Date	Location	Notes
4	Loss	1–2–1	Acelino Freitas	UD	8	30 May 2026	Pacaembu Stadium, São Paulo, Brazil	
3	Loss	1–1–1	King Kenny	UD	5	15 July 2023	3Arena, Dublin, Ireland	High Stakes Tournament semi-final
2	Win	1–0–1	Filipek	TKO	2 (5), 2:59	22 Apr 2023	Wembley Arena, London, England	High Stakes Tournament quarter-final
1	Draw	0–0–1	Acelino Freitas	UD	8	30 Jan 2022	Music Park, Balneário Camboriú, Brazil	

=== Amateur ===
1 fight	1 win	0 losses
By decision	1	0

No.	Result	Record	Opponent	Type	Round, time	Date	Location	Notes
1	Win	1–0	Mario Silva	UD	3	28 Sep 2019	Duo Art Ice, Alphaville, São Paulo, Brazil	

== Awards and nominations ==
Year	Award	Category	Recipient(s)	Result	Ref.
2013	Shorty Awards	Vídeo Blogger	Himself	Nominated	
2014	Shorty Awards	Vídeo Blogger	Himself	Runner-up	
2016	Grande Prêmio Risadaria Smiles	Grand Prix	Himself	Nominated	
2016	Meus Prêmios Nick	YouTuber Masculino Favorito	Himself	Nominated	
2016	Meus Prêmios Nick	Humorista Favorito	Himself	Won	
2016	Meus Prêmios Nick	Melhor Paródia Musical	Himself	Won	
2016	Prêmio Jovem Brasileiro	Melhor Humorista	Himself	Won	
2016	Prêmio Jovem Brasileiro	Personalidade da Internet	Himself	Nominated	
2017	Meus Prêmios Nick	Instagram Brasileiro Favorito	Himself	Won	
2017	Meus Prêmios Nick	Melhor YouTuber	Himself	Nominated	
2017	Grande Prêmio Risadaria Smiles	Melhor Conteúdo de Humor Digital	Himself	Nominated	
2017	Prêmio Jovem Brasileiro	Personalidade da Internet	Himself	Nominated	
2017	Prêmio Jovem Brasileiro	Melhor Humorista Jovem	Himself	Won	
2017	Prêmio Jovem Brasileiro	YouTuber do Ano	Himself	Nominated	
2017	Prêmio Jovem Brasileiro	Melhor Canal do YouTube	Himself	Nominated	
2017	Prêmio Jovem Brasileiro	Melhor Espetáculo Teatral/ Musical	Marminino	Nominated	
2018	MTV Millennial Awards	Ícone MIAW	Himself	Nominated	
2018	MTV Millennial Awards	YouTube do Ano	Himself	Nominated	
2018	MTV Millennial Awards	Paródia do Ano	Himself	Nominated	
2018	MTV Millennial Awards	Selfie do Ano	Himself	Won	
2018	MTV Millennial Awards	Super Squad	Himself	Won	
2020	Prêmio Contigo! de TV	Influencer do Ano	Role in Z4	Won	
2021	Prêmio iBest	Humor	Himself	Runner-up	
2021	Prêmio iBest	Instagrammer do Ano	Himself	Runner-up	
2021	Prêmio iBest	TikToker do Ano	Himself	Runner-up	
2021	Prêmio iBest	YouTuber do Ano	Himself	Nominated	
2021	Prêmio iBest	Influenciador Twitter	Himself	Nominated	
2021	Prêmio iBest	Personalidade do Ano	Himself	Nominated	
2021	Prêmio iBest	Creator do Ano	Himself	Nominated	
2022	MTV Millennial Awards	Pet Influencer	Regina	Nominated	
2022	MTV Millennial Awards	Ri Alto por Comedy Central	Himself	Won	
