= Tiradentes do Sul =

Municipality in Rio Grande do Sul, Brazil

Coordinates: 27°23′52″S 54°05′02″W

- Municipality
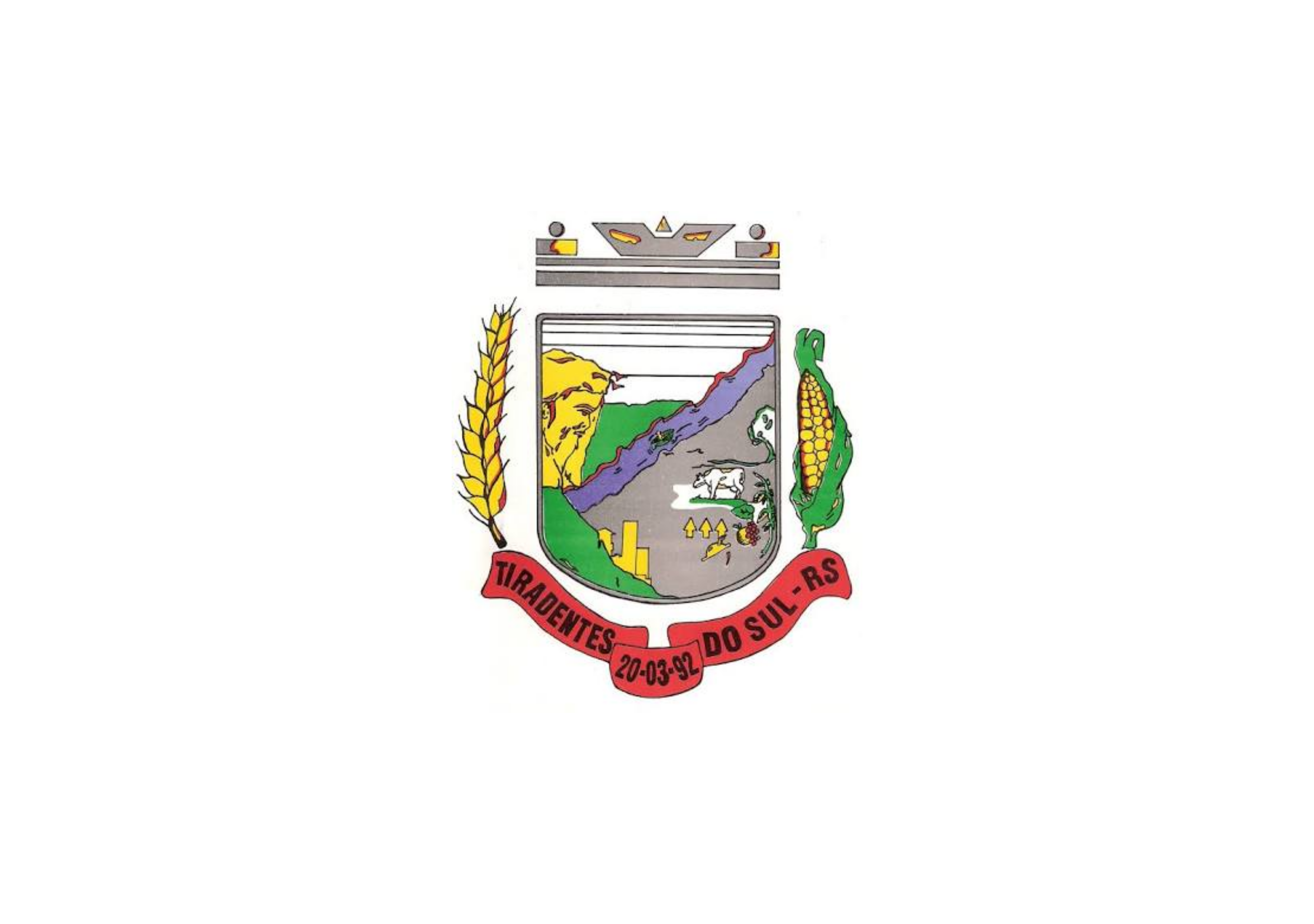
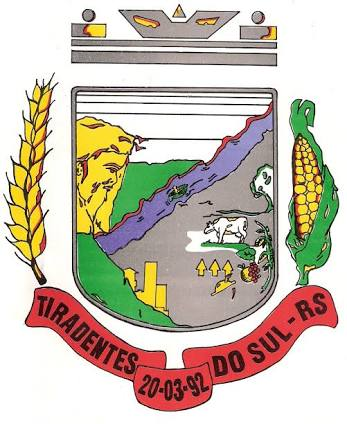
- Flag Coat of arms

- Location of Tiradentes do Sul in Rio Grande do Sul
- Country: Brazil
- Region: South
- State: Rio Grande do Sul
- Mesoregion: Noroeste Rio-Grandense
- Microregion: Três Passos
- Founded: 20 March 1992

Government
  - Mayor: Alceu Diel (PSDB, 2021 - 2024)

Area
  - Total: 236.653 km^{2} (91.372 sq mi)

Population (2021)
  - Total: 5,532
  - Density: 23.38/km^{2} (60.54/sq mi)
- Demonym: Tiradentense
- Time zone: UTC−3 (BRT)
- Website: Official website

Tiradentes do Sul is a municipality in the state of Rio Grande do Sul, Brazil. As of 2020, the estimated population was 5,616.

The municipality would be partially flooded by the proposed Panambí Dam.

== See also ==
- List of municipalities in Rio Grande do Sul
