= Alecrim =

Municipality of Rio Grande do Sul, Brazil

- Municipality
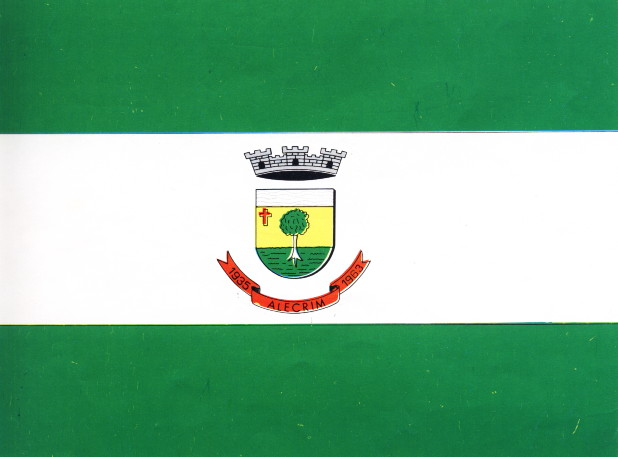
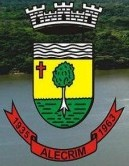
- Flag Coat of arms

- Location within Rio Grande do Sul

- Location in Brazil
- Coordinates: 27°39′28.11″S 54°46′02.64″W
- Country: Brazil
- State: Rio Grande do Sul
- Founded: 9 October 1963

Area
  - Total: 316.39 km^{2} (122.16 sq mi)

Population (2020)
  - Total: 5,827
  - Density: 22.38/km^{2} (58.0/sq mi)
- Time zone: UTC−3 (BRT)
- Website: http://www.alecrim.rs.gov.br/

Alecrim (pt-BR pronunciation, lit. 'rosemary') is a municipality in the state of Rio Grande do Sul, Brazil.

The municipality would be partially flooded by the proposed Panambí Dam.

== See also ==
- List of municipalities in Rio Grande do Sul
