= Tuparendi =

Municipality in Rio Grande do Sul, Brazil

Coordinates: 27°45′S 54°30′W

- Municipality
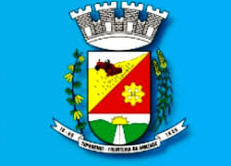
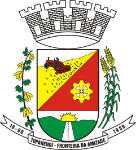
- Flag Coat of arms

- Location of Tuparendi in Rio Grande do Sul
- Country: Brazil
- Region: South
- State: Rio Grande do Sul
- Mesoregion: Noroeste Rio-Grandense
- Microregion: Santa Rosa
- Founded: 10 September 1959

Government
  - Mayor: Leonel Petry (PDT, 2021 - 2024)

Area
  - Total: 307.71 km^{2} (118.81 sq mi)

Population (2021)
  - Total: 7,730
  - Density: 25.1/km^{2} (65.1/sq mi)
- Demonym: Tuparendiense
- Time zone: UTC−3 (BRT)
- Website: Official website

Tuparendi is a municipality in the state of Rio Grande do Sul, Brazil. As of 2020, the estimated population was 7,810.

The municipality would be partially flooded by the proposed Panambí Dam.

== Notable people ==
Luísa Sonza, Singer and Songwriter

== See also ==
- List of municipalities in Rio Grande do Sul
