= Mauro Ferreira =

Brazilian music critic and journalist

- Born: Mauro Ferreira do Nascimento; July 6, 1965 (age 61); Rio de Janeiro, Rio de Janeiro, Brazil
- Education: Centro Universitário da Cidade do Rio de Janeiro
- Occupations: Journalist; Music critic
- Years active: 1987–present
- Known for: Music criticism and Brazilian music journalism
- Notable work: Columns and reviews for O Globo (1989–1997), O Dia (1997–2016), IstoÉ Gente (2000–2012), Rolling Stone Brasil, G1 (Blog do Mauro Ferreira, since 2017)
- Website: https://www.blognotasmusicais.com.br

Mauro Ferreira do Nascimento (July 6, 1965) is a Brazilian journalist, music critic and playwright, known for his work in music journalism since the 1980s.

== Biography ==
=== Early years and education ===
He was born in the Tomás Coelho neighborhood of Rio de Janeiro in 1965. He graduated in journalism from the Centro Universitário da Cidade do Rio de Janeiro (UniverCidade) in 1980.

=== Career ===
He began his professional career in 1987, while still in college, writing for the music page of the newspaper O Municipal. Between 1989 and 1997, he worked as a reporter and music critic for the newspaper O Globo. In 1998, he moved to another Rio de Janeiro newspaper, O Dia, where he was a music columnist until 2016. In magazines, he contributed to IstoÉ Gente between 2000 and 2012, in addition to being a regular contributor to the Brazilian edition of Rolling Stone from 2007 until the end of the magazine's monthly print edition.

In 2013, he released his first book on music, Cantadas – A sedução da voz feminina em 25 anos de jornalismo musical (in free translation, Cantadas – The seduction of the female voice in 25 years of music journalism), by Mauad Publishing House. Nine years later, the book was reissued with ten additional singers profiled, this time published by Garota FM Books.

Between November 2006 and June 2016, he maintained the blog Notas Musicais, hosted on Blogger service, which he updated daily. At the end of 2016, he moved his blog to G1, Globo Group's digital news portal, where he writes a daily column dedicated to journalistic commentary on music and the Brazilian music industry; it is also an opinion column on current concerts and music releases.

== Books ==
- Cantadas – A sedução da voz feminina em 25 anos de jornalismo musical. Rio de Janeiro: Mauad, 2013;
- Cantadas – A sedução da voz feminina em 235 anos de jornalismo musical. Rio de Janeiro: Garota FM Books, 2022.
