= G1 (website) =

Brazilian online news portal

g1
- Website type: News
- Available in: Portuguese; English; Spanish
- Owner: Grupo Globo
- Website: g1.globo.com
- Commercial: Yes
- Registration: Optional
- Launched: 18 September 2006; 20 years ago
- Current status: Active

G1, stylized as g1, is a Brazilian news portal maintained by Grupo Globo and under the guidance of Central Globo de Jornalismo. It was released on 18 September 2006.

Versions in English and Spanish were released on 11 June 2010, and had videos subtitled in both languages, but both have since been discontinued.

In 2015, the portal received exclusive program on TV Globo, the G1 em 1 Minuto.

In September 2021, to celebrate its 15th anniversary, the portal changed its logo to a new style, also changing the stylizing of the name, changing the G to be lowercase.
