= List of songs recorded by Luísa Sonza =

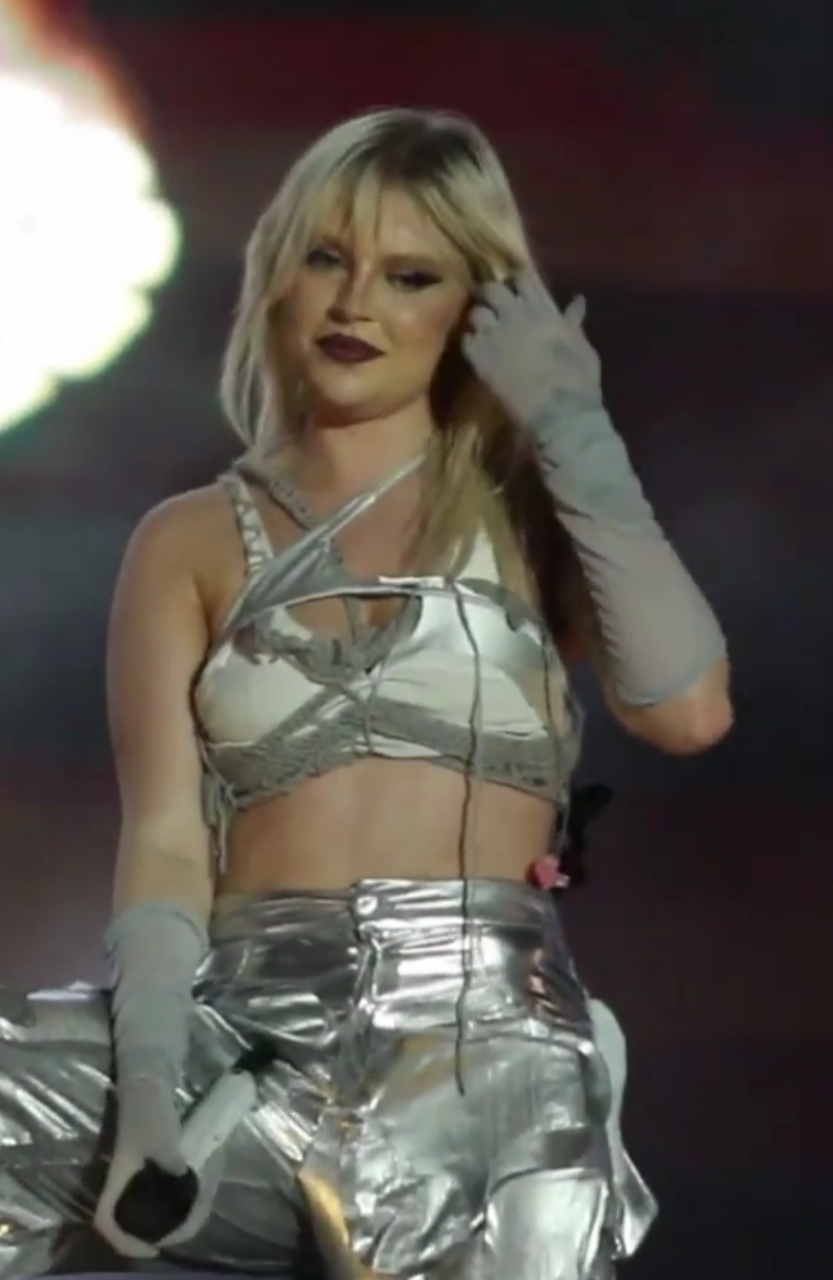
Luísa Sonza performing in 2023.

Brazilian singer-songwriter Luísa Sonza has recorded songs for three studio albums, two extended plays (EPs), and other album or singles appearances.

After signing with Universal Music Brazil, in 2017 she released her first self-titled extended play, which contains her first single titled "Good Vibes". Sonza released her debut studio album, Pandora, in 2019. For the promotion, five singles were released: "Pior Que Possa Imaginar", "Garupa", "Fazendo Assim", "Bomba Relógio", and "Não Vou Mais Parar". Sonza's second studio album, Doce 22, was released in June 2021. Two years later she released her third studio album, Escândalo Íntimo, which contains the song "Penhasco2", a collaboration with American singer-songwriter Demi Lovato.

== Songs ==
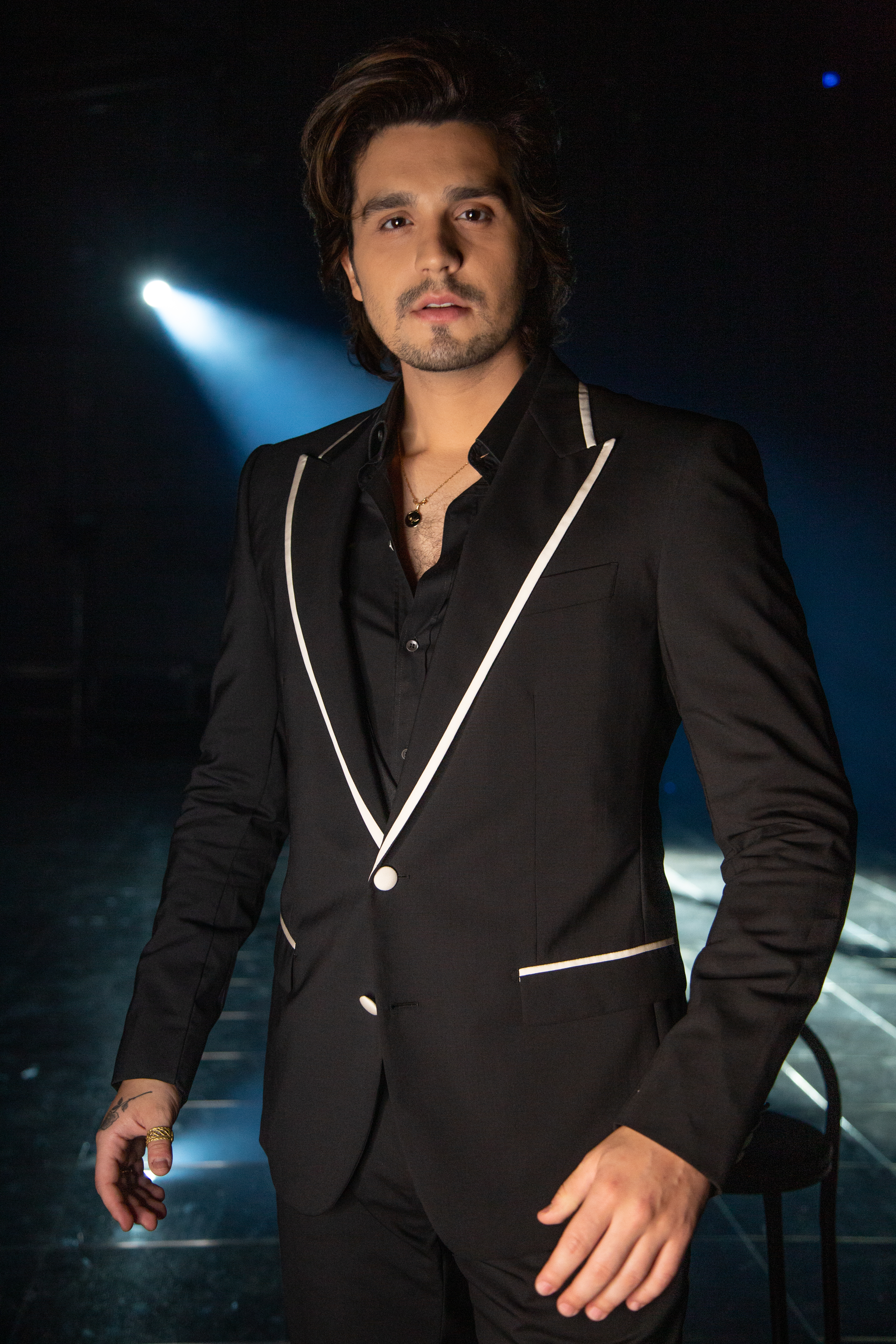
Luan Santana (pictured) collaborated with Sonza on "Não Preciso De Você Pra Nada" and "Com Que Roupa".

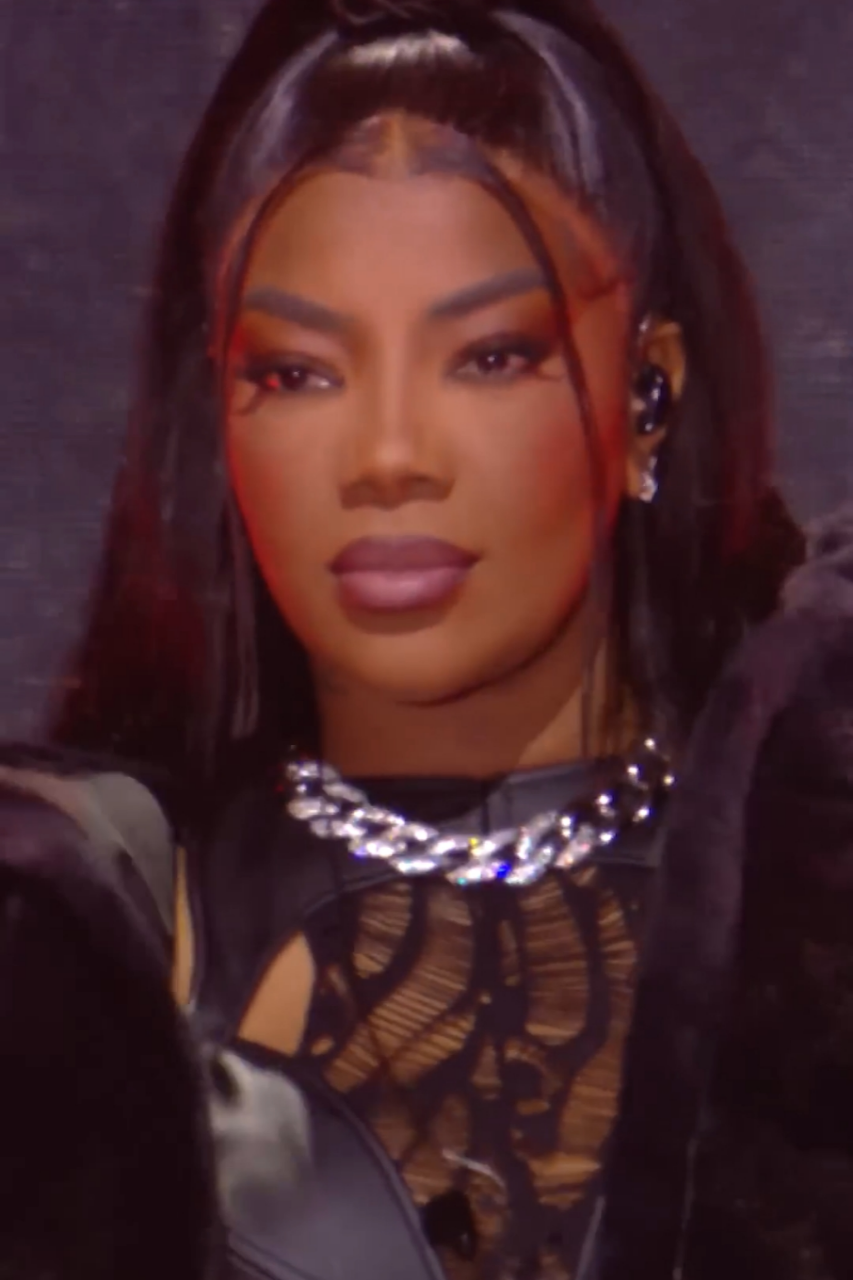
Ludmilla (pictured) collaborated with Sonza on "Com Que Roupa", "Café da Manhã" and "Medley Lud Session".

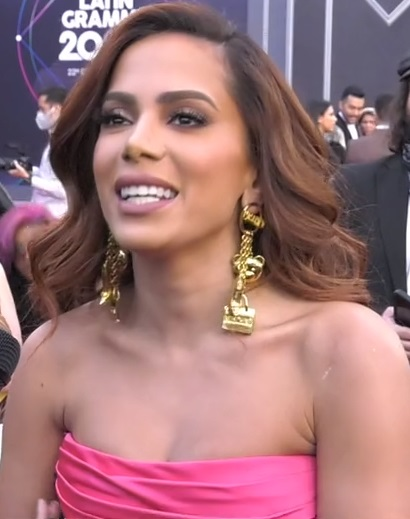
Brazilian singer Anitta (pictured) collaborated with Sonza on "Combatchy" and "Modo Turbo".

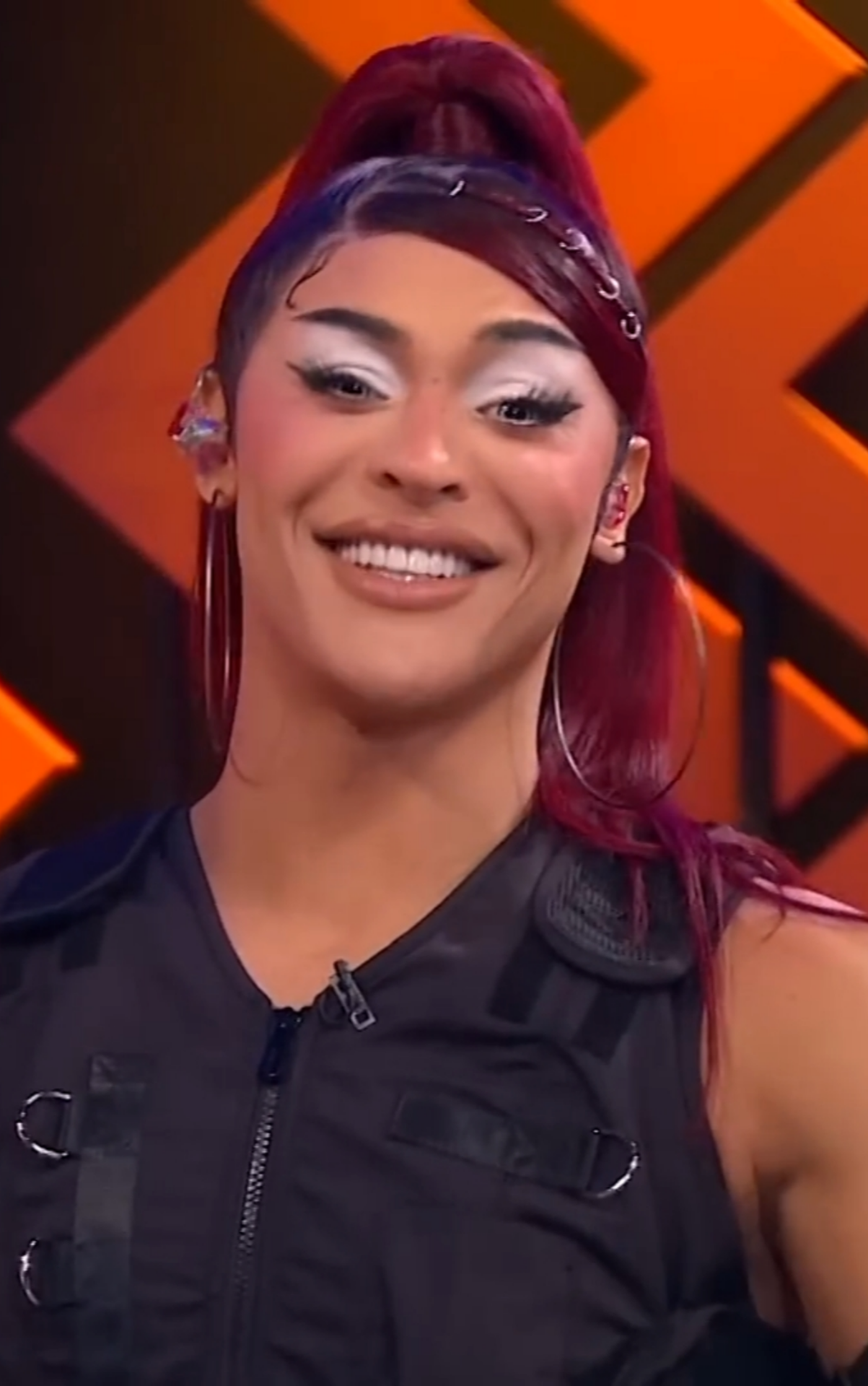
Pabllo Vittar (pictured) collaborated with Sonza on "Garupa" and "Modo Turbo".

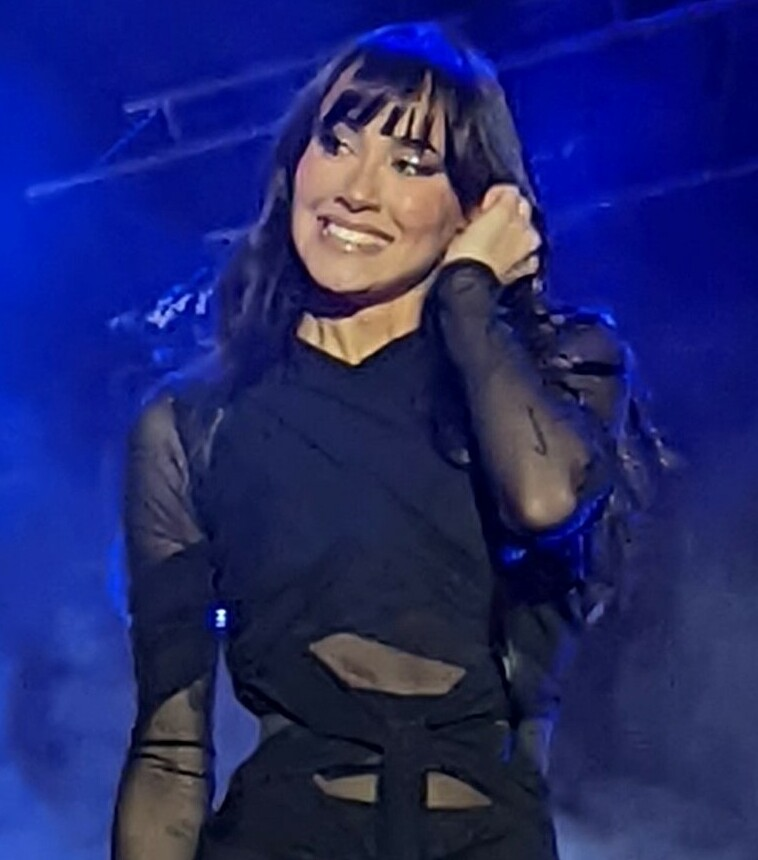
Aitana (pictured) collaborated with Sonza on "Friend de Semana".

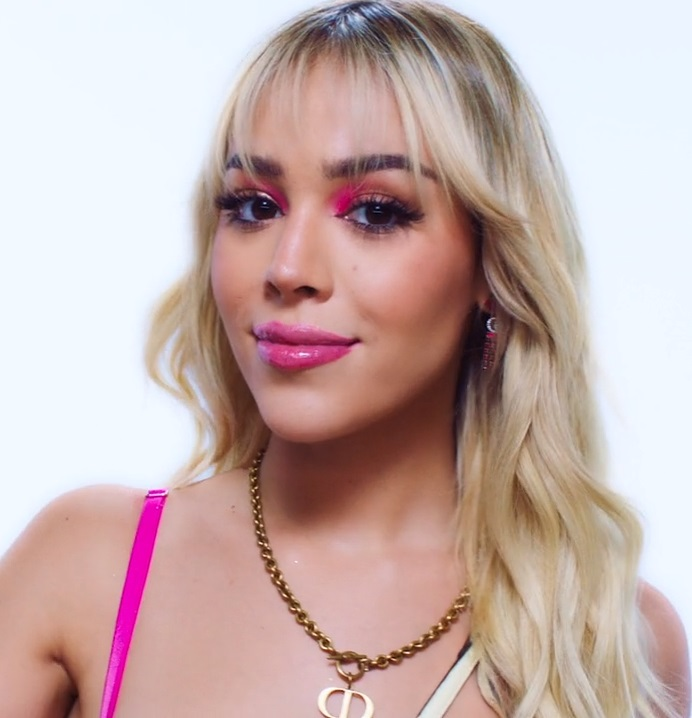
Danna Paola (pictured) collaborated with Sonza on "Friend de Semana".

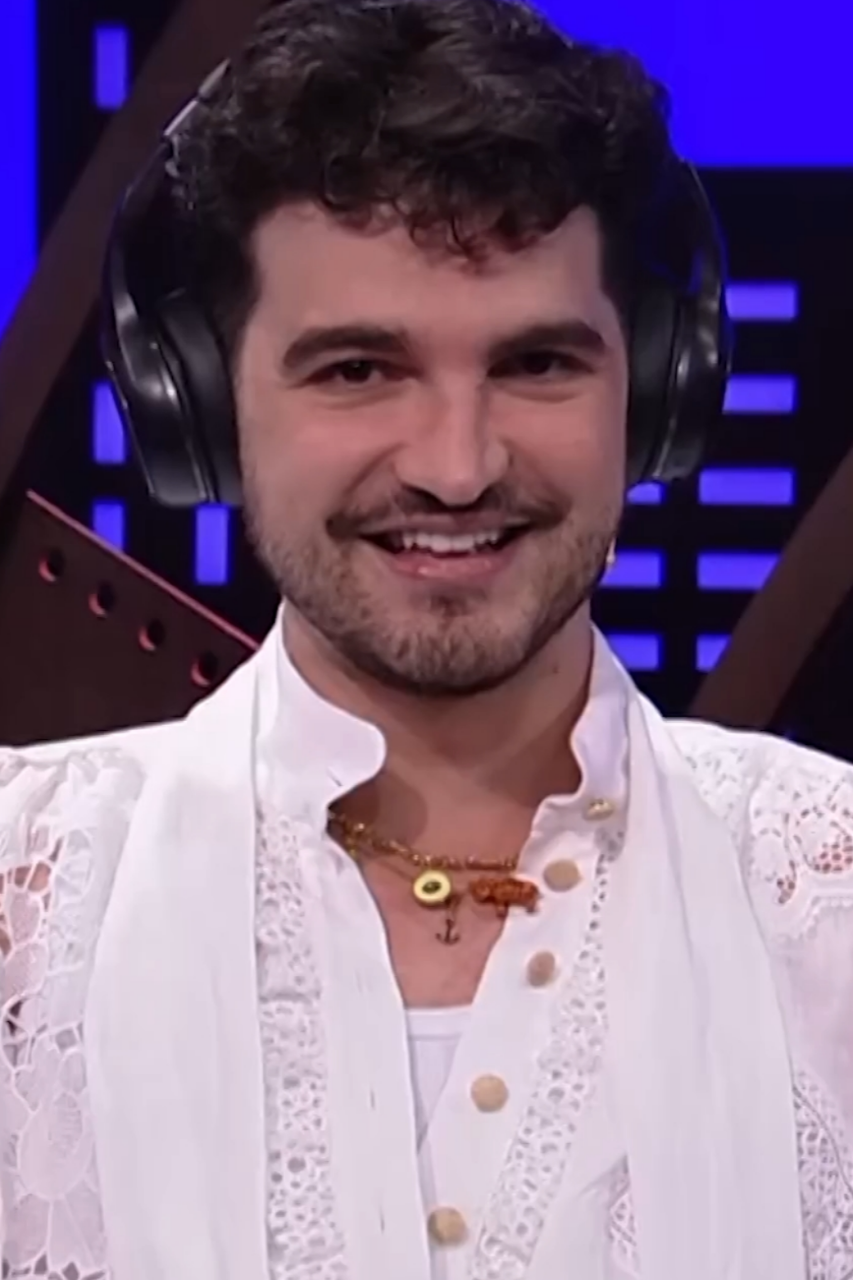
Jão (pictured) collaborated with Sonza on "Fugitivos", from Sonza's second studio album Doce 22.

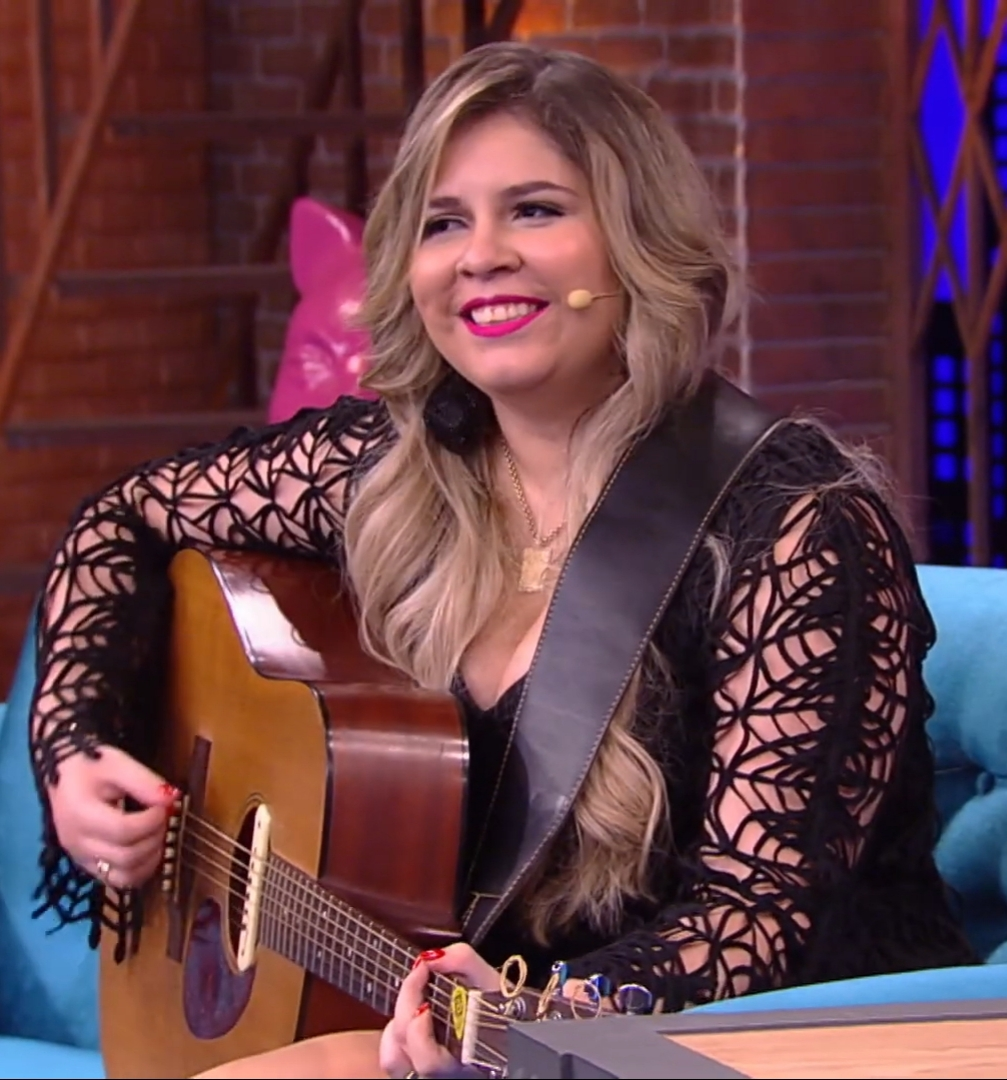
Marília Mendonça (pictured) collaborated with Sonza on the remix of "Melhor Sozinha".

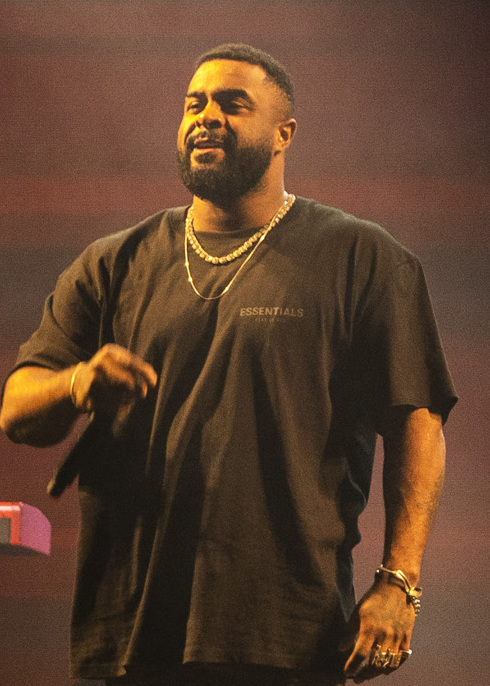
Brazilian rapper Baco Exu do Blues (pictured) collaborated with Sonza on "Hotel Caro".

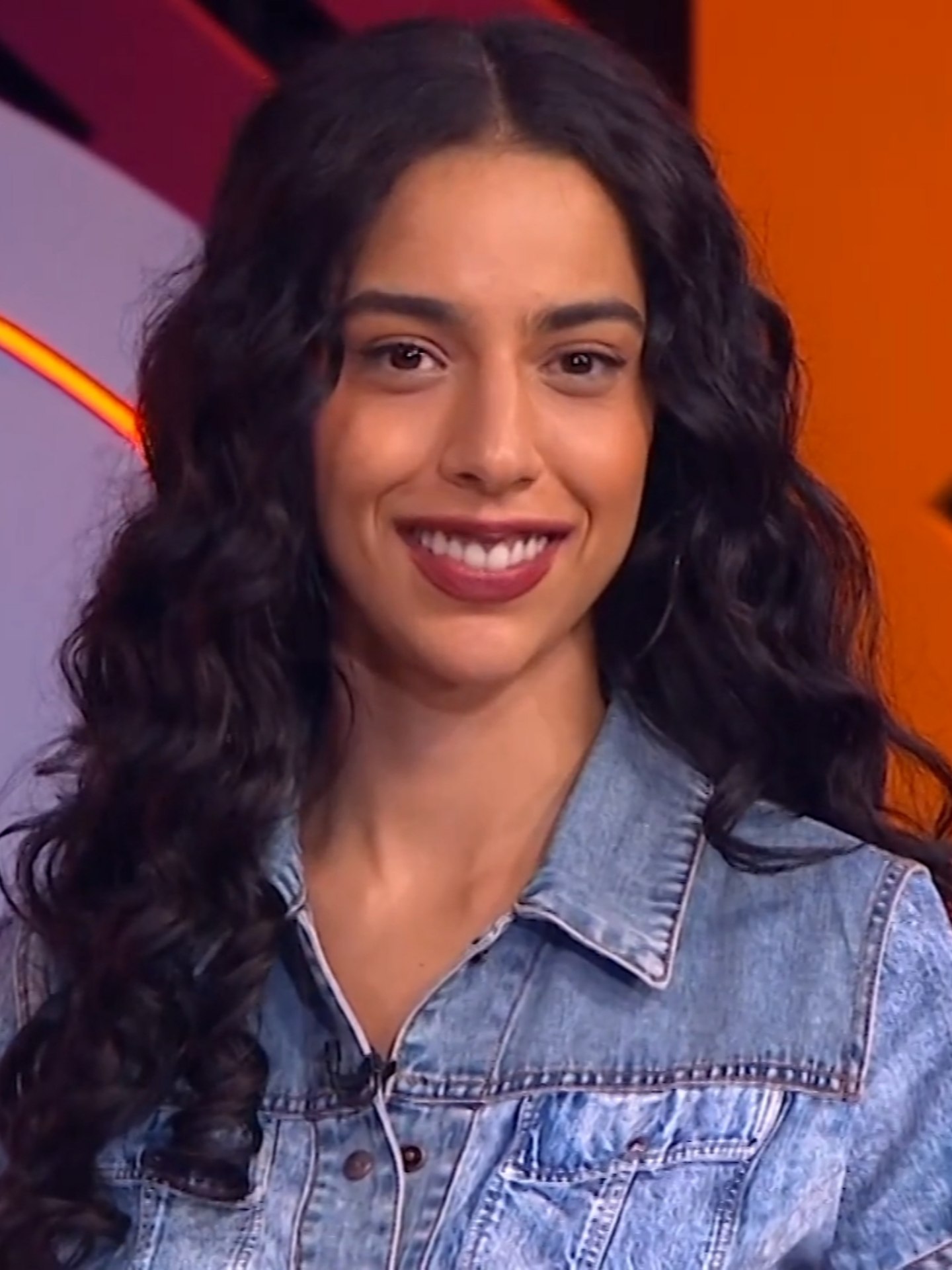
Marina Sena (pictured) collaborated with Sonza on "Romance em Cena", from Sonza's third studio album Escândalo Íntimo.

Key
| ‡ | Indicates song written solely by Sonza |
| • | Indicates an unreleased song |

| Song | Artist(s) | Writer(s) | Album(s) | Year | Ref. |
|---|---|---|---|---|---|
| "2000" | Luísa Sonza | Luísa Sonza; Nave; Carol Biazin; Day Limns; Diego Timbó | Doce 22 | 2021 | |
| "A Dona Aranha" | Luísa Sonza | Luísa Sonza; Tommy Brown; Courageous Xavier Herrera; Douglas Moda; Carolina Marcílio; Jenni Mosello; Marqueze Parker; Njomza | Escândalo Íntimo | 2023 | |
| "Ain't Worried" | Bruno Martini, Luísa Sonza and Diarra Sylla | Bruno Martini; Mayra Arduini; F.E van Duijn; William Commandeur | Original | 2021 | |
| "Amor, Que Pena" | Luísa Sonza | Luísa Sonza; Carolina Marcílio; Roy Lenzo; Douglas Moda; Ariana Wong; Jahnei Clarke | Brutal Paraíso | 2026 | |
| "Ana Maria" | Luísa Sonza with Duda Beat | Luísa Sonza; Douglas Moda; Roy Lenzo; Carolina Marcílio; Jenni Mosello; Mason Sacks; Ariana Wong; Jonathan Asperil | Escândalo Íntimo | 2023 | |
| "Anaconda" | Luísa Sonza with Mariah Angeliq | Luísa Sonza; Lucas Vaz; Jenni Mosello; Day Limns; Carol Biazin; Renato Frei; King; Aisha; Mariah Angeliq; Reggi El Autentico; Play N Skillz | Doce 22 | 2021 | |
| "Anjo" | Kelly Key featuring Luísa Sonza | Andinho | Do Jeito Delas | 2020 | |
| "Apenas Eu" | Luísa Sonza | Luísa Sonza; André Vieira; Pedro Breder; Wallace Vianna | Pandora | 2019 | |
| "Atenção" | Pedro Sampaio with Luísa Sonza | Luísa Sonza; Pedro Sampaio; Rafinha RSQ | Chama Meu Nome | 2021 | |
| "A Vida Como Ela É" | Luísa Sonza | Luísa Sonza; Carolina Marcílio; Vicente "Vibarco" Jiménez; Roy Lenzo; Douglas Moda; Ariana Wong; Asperil | Brutal Paraíso | 2026 | |
| "Bébada Favorita" • | Luísa Sonza with Maiara & Maraisa | Luísa Sonza; Douglas Moda; Carolzinha; Jenni Mosello; Ernesto Nazareth; Pep Starling | Escândalo Íntimo | 2023 | |
| "Boa Menina" | Luísa Sonza | Luísa Sonza; Arthur Marques; Diego Timbó; DJ Thai | Pandora | 2019 | |
| "Bomba Relógio" | Luísa Sonza with Vitão | Luísa Sonza; Vitão; André Vieira; Wallace Vianna; Pedro Breder Mantra | Pandora | 2019 | |
| "Braba" | Luísa Sonza | Luísa Sonza; Arthur Marques; Diego Timbó; DJ Thai; Aisha | Non-album single | 2020 | |
| "Cachorrinhas" | Luísa Sonza | Luísa Sonza; Diggo Martins; Elana Dara; Hodari; Laudz; Zegon | Non-album single | 2022 | |
| "Café da Manhã" | Luísa Sonza with Ludmilla | Luísa Sonza; Ludmilla; Douglas Moda; Caio Paiva; Vitão; Hodari; Luccas Carlos | Doce 22 | 2022 | |
| "Campo de Morango" | Luísa Sonza | Luísa Sonza; Douglas Moda; Jenni Mosello; Lucas Vaz; Mason Sacks; Roy Lenzo; Jahnei Clarke; Carolzinha | Escândalo Íntimo | 2023 | |
| "Câncer" | Xamã with Luísa Sonza | Xamã | Zodíaco | 2020 | |
| "Cansar Você" | Luísa Sonza with Thiaguinho | Luísa Sonza; Vitão; Douglas Moda | Non-album single | 2021 | |
| "Caos / Flor" | Luísa Sonza | Luísa Sonza; Day Limns; Douglas Moda | Doce 22 | 2021 | |
| "Carnificina" | Luísa Sonza | Luísa Sonza; Douglas Moda; Roy Lenzo; Carolina Marcílio; Jenni Mosello; TK; Ariana Wong; Jonathan Asperil | Escândalo Íntimo | 2023 | |
| "Cavalgada" | Luísa Sonza with Heavy Baile | Leo Justi; DJ Thai; Arthur Marques; MC Tchelinho | Non-album single | 2019 | |
| "Chico" | Luísa Sonza | Luísa Sonza; Bruno Caliman; Douglas Moda; Carolina Marcílio; Jenni Mosello | Escândalo Íntimo | 2023 | |
| "Com Que Roupa" | Luan Santana, Luísa Sonza and Cléo featuring Ludmilla | Noel Rosa | Non-album single | 2018 | |
| "Combatchy" | Anitta, Lexa and Luísa Sonza featuring Rebecca | André Vieira; Pedro Breder; Romeu R3; Wallace Vianna | Non-album single | 2019 | |
| "Coração Cigano" | Luan Santana with Luísa Sonza | Luan Santana; Lucas Santos | Luan City (Ao Vivo) | 2022 | |
| "Cry About It Later" (remix) | Katy Perry featuring Luísa Sonza and Bruno Martini | Katy Perry; Oscar Holter; Noonie Bao; Sasha Sloan | Non-album single | 2021 | |
| "Deixa Eu Viver" | Mari Fernandez featuring Luísa Sonza | Daniel Cometa; Guilherme Olliver; Matheus Rosado; Thavares; Vicentine | Ao Vivo em São Paulo | 2023 | |
| "Devagarinho" | Luísa Sonza | André Vieira; Wallace Vianna; Pedro Breder | Pandora | 2019 | |
| "Eliane" | Luísa Sonza | Luísa Sonza; Francisco Gil | Pandora | 2019 | |
| "Embarcação do Amor" | Hodari featuring Luísa Sonza | Luísa Sonza; Rafinha RSQ; Hodari; Douglas Moda | Hodari | 2022 | |
| "Escândalo Íntimo" | Luísa Sonza | Beto Ruschel Salvanini | Escândalo Íntimo | 2023 | |
| "Esse É O Lugar" | Luísa Sonza | Alan Menken; Phil Johnston; Tom MacDougall | Ralph Breaks the Internet | 2018 | |
| "Eu, Você, Pipoca e Netflix" | Suel featuring Luísa Sonza | Jefferson Junior; Umberto Tavares | Status | 2019 | |
| "Fazendo Assim" | Luísa Sonza with Gaab | Luísa Sonza; Gaab; Wallace Vianna; Luan Rafael; Dennis Andrade | Pandora | 2019 | |
| "Flores" | Luísa Sonza and Vitão | Vitão; Los Brasileros | Non-album single | 2020 | |
| "Friend de Semana" | Danna Paola, Aitana and Luísa Sonza | Luísa Sonza; Danna Paola; Aitana; Mango Nabález; Pedro Malaver Turbay; Arthur Marques | K.O. | 2020 | |
| "Fugitivos" | Luísa Sonza with Jão | Luísa Sonza; Jão; Douglas Moda; André Jordão | Doce 22 | 2021 | |
| "Garupa" | Luísa Sonza with Pabllo Vittar | Pabllo Vittar; Arthur Marques; Maffalda; Pablo Bispo; Rodrigo Gorky; Zebu | Pandora | 2019 | |
| "Good Vibes" | Luísa Sonza | Luísa Sonza ‡ | Luísa Sonza | 2017 | |
| "Hotel Caro" | Baco Exu do Blues with Luísa Sonza | Luísa Sonza; Baco Exu do Blues | Non-album single | 2022 | |
| "Iguaria" | Luísa Sonza | Luísa Sonza; Carolzinha; Douglas Moda; Jahnei Clarke; Jenni Mosello; Mason Sacks; Roy Lenzo; TK Kayembe | Escândalo Íntimo | 2023 | |
| "Interesseira" | Luísa Sonza | Luísa Sonza; Douglas Moda; Rafinha RSQ; Tin; Luccas Carlos; Diego Timbó; Arthur Marques | Doce 22 | 2021 | |
| "Interlude" | Luísa Sonza | Luísa Sonza; Douglas Moda; Isabela Freitas | Doce 22 | 2021 | |
| "Interlúdio - De Amor" • | Luísa Sonza | Luísa Sonza; Daramola; Elena Rose | Escândalo Íntimo | 2023 | |
| "Interlúdio - Dão Errado" | Luísa Sonza | Vanessa da Mata | Escândalo Íntimo | 2023 | |
| "Interlúdio - Todas as Histórias" | Luísa Sonza | Luísa Sonza; Carolzinha; Iuri Rio Branco; Jenni Mosello; Lucas Vaz; Marina Sena; NAVE Beatz | Escândalo Íntimo | 2023 | |
| "Joga pra Mim" | Rennan da Penha, 3030 and Luísa Sonza | Rod; LK; Chelles; Arthur Marques | Segue o Baile (Ao Vivo) | 2020 | |
| "La Muerte" • | Luísa Sonza | Luísa Sonza; Elena Rose; Daramola | Escândalo Íntimo | 2023 | |
| "Lança Menina" | Luísa Sonza | Luísa Sonza; Carolzinha; Douglas Moda; Jahnei Clarke; Jenni Mosello; Mason Sacks; Rita Lee; Roberto de Carvalho; Roy Lenzo; TK; Yehonatan Aspril | Escândalo Íntimo | 2023 | |
| "Luísa Manequim" | Luísa Sonza | Luísa Sonza; Abílio Manoe; Asa Taccone; Carolzinha; Cole M.G.N. Greif Neill; Douglas Moda; Jenni Mosello | Escândalo Íntimo | 2023 | |
| "Mamacita (Hasta La Vista)" | Luísa Sonza with Xamã or remix featuring Karol Conká | Luísa Sonza; Xamã; Douglas Moda; Junior Lord; Karol Conká | Mamacita (Remixes) | 2022 or 2023 | |
| "Medley Lud Session" | Ludmilla with Luísa Sonza | Luísa Sonza; Ludmilla; André Jordão; Caio Paiva; Carol Biazin; Day Limns; Douglas Moda; Hodari; Jefferson Junior; Luccas Carlos; MC Kevin; Umberto Tavares; Vitão | Non-album single | 2022 | |
| "Melhor Sozinha" | Luísa Sonza or with Marília Mendonça | Luísa Sonza; Douglas Moda; Nave; Carol Biazin; Vitão | Doce 22 | 2021 | |
| "Modo Turbo" | Luísa Sonza and Pabllo Vittar featuring Anitta | Luísa Sonza; Rafinha RSQ; Arthur Marques; Diego Timbó | Doce 22 | 2020 | |
| "Mulher do Ano" | Luísa Sonza | Luísa Sonza; Douglas Moda; Vitão; Hodari; Luccas Carlos | Doce 22 | 2021 | |
| "Não Preciso De Você Pra Nada" | Luísa Sonza with Luan Santana | Luan Santana; Douglas Cesar | Luísa Sonza | 2017 | |
| "Não Sou Demais" | Luísa Sonza | Luísa Sonza; Roy Lenzo; Yoni; Ariana Wong | Escândalo Íntimo | 2023 | |
| "Não Vai Embora" | Dilsinho with Luísa Sonza | Luísa Sonza; Dilsinho; Keviin; Arthur M. Timbó | Non-album single | 2020 | |
| "Não Vou Mais Parar" | Luísa Sonza | Luísa Sonza; Pedro Breder; André Vieira; Wallace Vianna | Pandora | 2019 | |
| "Nunca Foi Sorte" | Luísa Sonza | Aguinaldo Silva; Piter Baptista Da Silva; Adalberto Neto; Patricio | Non-album single | 2018 | |
| "O Amor Tem Dessas (E é Melhor Assim)" • | Luísa Sonza | Luísa Sonza; Aisha; Bruno Caliman; Dan Ferreira; Douglas Moda; André Jordão | Escândalo Íntimo | 2023 | |
| "O Conto dos Dois Mundos (Hipocrisia)" | Luísa Sonza | Luísa Sonza; Douglas Moda; Vitão; André Jordão | Doce 22 | 2021 | |
| "Olhos Castanhos" | Luísa Sonza | Luísa Sonza ‡ | Luísa Sonza | 2017 | |
| "Onde É Que Deu Errado?" | Luísa Sonza | Luísa Sonza; Aisha; Bruno Caliman; Dan Ferreira; Douglas Moda; André Jordão | Escândalo Íntimo | 2023 | |
| "Outra Vez" | Luísa Sonza | Luísa Sonza; Aisha; Carlos Bezerra; Douglas Moda; André Jordão; Dan Ferreira | Escândalo Íntimo | 2023 | |
| "Penhasco" | Luísa Sonza | Luísa Sonza; Douglas Moda; Day Limns; Carol Biazin; André Jordão | Doce 22 | 2023 | |
| "Penhasco2" | Luísa Sonza with Demi Lovato | Luísa Sonza; Demi Lovato; Douglas Moda; Jenni Mosello; Carol Biazin; Day Limns; Carolina Marcílio; Roy Lenzo; Papatinho | Escândalo Íntimo | 2023 | |
| "Principalmente Me Sinto Arrasada" | Luísa Sonza | Luísa Sonza; Jenni Mosello; Douglas Moda; Carolzinha; Roy Lenzo; Ariana Wong; Jahnei Clarke; Yoni | Escândalo Íntimo | 2023 | |
| "Perigo" | Rick & Nogueira featuring Luísa Sonza | Rahi Renan Ferrari; Rafael Aguiar Santos Galdino; Bruno Caliman | Non-album single | 2018 | |
| "Pior Que Possa Imaginar" | Luísa Sonza | André Vieira; Wallace Vianna; Pedro Breder; L. Vaz; Bibi; MC Tha | Pandora | 2019 | |
| "Poesia Acústica 13" | Pineapple StormTv, Chris MC, Salve Malak, Tz da Coronel, MC Cabelinho, Chefin, L7nnon, Luísa Sonza, Oruam, Xamã and N.I.N.A | Luísa Sonza; Anna Ruth; Elana Dara; Geizon Fernandes; Lennon Frassetti; Lucas Malak; Matheus de Araujo; Mauro Davi; Nathanael Cauã; Victor Hugo; Victor Silva de Lima | Non-album single | 2022 | |
| "Posição de Ataque" | Papatinho with Luísa Sonza and DJ Biel do Furduncinho | Luísa Sonza; DJ Biel do Furduncinho; DJ BR da Tijuca; Gabily; Papatinho | Baile do Papato | 2023 | |
| "Quarto Andar" | As Baías with Luísa Sonza | Rafael Acerbi Pereira; Amanda Coronha; Mônica Agena; Juliano Cortuah | Drama Latino | 2021 | |
| "Quebrar Seu Coração" | Lexa featuring Luísa Sonza | Lexa; Pablo Bispo; Ruxell; Sergio Santos | Lexa | 2020 | |
| "Quem Tem Fome Tem Pressa" | Ação da Cidadania featuring Luísa Sonza | Alexandre Silva de Assis Gilson; Bernini Pedro Assad Medeiros Torres; Leandro Roque de Oliveira | Non-album single | 2020 | |
| "Raio X" | Carol Biazin with Luísa Sonza | Carol Biazin; Los Brasileros; Day Limns | Beijo de Judas | 2022 | |
| "Rebolar" | Luísa Sonza | Luísa Sonza; Jefferson Junior; Umberto Tavares | Luísa Sonza | 2019 | |
| "Romance em Cena" | Luísa Sonza with Marina Sena | Luísa Sonza; Vinicius Leonard Moreira; Iuri Rio Branco; Lucas Vaz; Carolina Marcílio; Jenni Mosello; Marina Sena | Escândalo Íntimo | 2023 | |
| "Sagrado Profano" • | Luísa Sonza with KayBlack | Luísa Sonza; Jahnei Clarke; Douglas Moda; KayBlack; Roy Lenzo; Carolzinha; Jenni Mosello; Ariana Wong; Yoni | Escândalo Íntimo | 2023 | |
| "Saudade" | Ferrugem with Luísa Sonza | Dan Ferreira; Daniel Mendes; Diego Barão | Interessante | 2023 | |
| "Saudade da Gente" | Luísa Sonza | Luísa Sonza; André Vieira; Pedro Breder; Wallace Vianna; Bibi | Pandora | 2019 | |
| "Século 21" | Leo Santana with Luísa Sonza | Rafinha RSQ; Rodrigo Martins; Ed Nobre | Paredão do Gigante | 2020 | |
| "Sentadona" (remix) | Davi Kneip, MC Frog, DJ Gabriel do Borel and Luísa Sonza | Luísa Sonza; Carol Biazin; Davi Kneip; DJ Gabriel do Borel; Elana Dara; Mc Frog | Non-album single | 2022 | |
| "Surreal" | Luísa Sonza with Baco Exu do Blues | Luísa Sonza; Roy Lenzo; Douglas Moda; TK; Ariana Wong; Jonathan Asperil; Jahnei Clarke; Carolina Marcílio; Jenni Mosello; Baco Exu do Blues | Escândalo Íntimo | 2023 | |
| "Tá Perdendo Tempo" | Diego Thug featuring Luísa Sonza | Mr. Thug | Thugluv | 2016 | |
| "Também Não Sei de Nada" | Luísa Sonza with Lulu Santos | Luísa Sonza; Vitão; Nave | Doce 22 | 2021 | |
| "Te Levo Comigo" | Thiago Martins featuring Luísa Sonza | Bibi Cavalcante; Fernanda Maia | Amor de Mãe - Hits Ryan | 2020 | |
| "Tentação" | Carol Biazin with Luísa Sonza | Carol Biazin; Los Brasileros | Beijo de Judas | 2021 | |
| "The Weekend" | PrettyMuch with Luísa Sonza | Brandon Arreaga; Edwin Honoret; Gregory Hein | INTL:EP | 2019 | |
| "Toma" | MC Zaac with Luísa Sonza | Luísa Sonza; MC Zaac; Diego Timbó; Rodrigo Gorky; Maffalda; Arthur Marques; Zebu; Matheus da Costa; Pierre Tavares | Non-album single | 2020 | |
| "Tudo de Bom" | PK with Luísa Sonza | Jefferson Junior; Romeu R3; Umberto Tavares | Non-album single | 2019 | |
| "Twilight" | Bruno Martini with Luísa Sonza | Bruno Martini; Mayra Arduini; Aguida | Original | 2021 | |
| "VIP" | Luísa Sonza with 6lack | Luísa Sonza; 6lack DJ Thai; Arthur Marques; Jenni Mosello; Carol Biazin; King | Doce 22 | 2021 | |
| "Você Me Vira A Cabeça (Me Tira do Sério) / Depois do Prazer" | Mumuzinho with Luísa Sonza | Chico Roque; Paulo Sergio Kostenbader Valle; Sérgio Caetano | Resenha do Mumu (Ao Vivo) | 2022 | |
| "You Don't Know Me" • | Luísa Sonza | Caetano Veloso | Escândalo Íntimo | 2023 | |
