= Luísa Sonza discography =

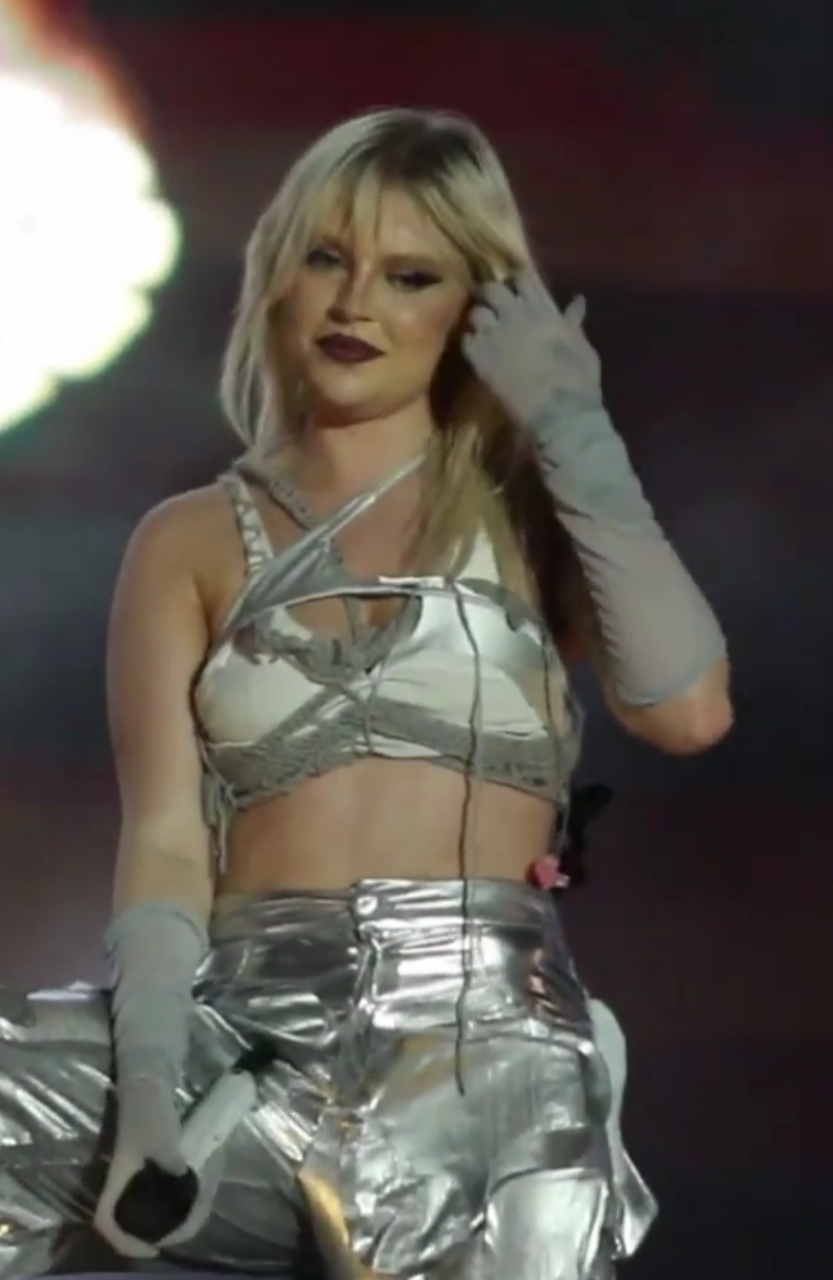
- Sonza performing in February 2023
- Studio albums: 5
- EPs: 2
- Singles: 49
- Promotional singles: 6

Brazilian singer-songwriter Luísa Sonza has released three studio albums, two extended plays (EPs), 49 singles (including 18 as a featured artist), and 6 promotional singles since the beginning of her career.

After signing with Universal Music Brazil, she released her first self-titled extended play. In 2019, she released her debut studio album titled Pandora, which was certified Platinum by Pro-Música Brasil. Sonza released her second studio album titled Doce 22 in 2021, and on the same year she collaborated with Katy Perry on the remix of the song "Cry About It Later", from Perry's fifth studio album Smile (2020). Two years later she released her third studio album, Escândalo Íntimo, after signing with Sony Music Brazil. The album contains "Penhasco2", a song with American singer-songwriter Demi Lovato.

== Albums ==
=== Solo studio albums ===
List of studio albums, with selected chart positions
Title	Album details	Peak chart positions		Certifications
Title	Album details	IRE	POR	Certifications
Pandora	Released: 14 June 2019; Label: Universal Music; Formats: CD, digital download, streaming	—	—	PMB: Platinum
Doce 22	Released: 18 July 2021; Label: Universal; Formats: Digital download, streaming	—	140	PMB: 2× Diamond
Escândalo Íntimo	Released: 29 August 2023; Label: Sony; Formats: Digital download, streaming	78	13	PMB: 2× Diamond
Brutal Paraíso	Released: 7 April 2026; Label: Sony; Formats: Digital download, streaming	—N/a	—N/a	PMB: Gold

=== Collaborative studio albums ===
List of collaborative studio albums
Title	Album details
Bossa Sempre Nova (with Roberto Menescal and Toquinho)	Released: 13 January 2026; Label: Sony; Formats: Digital download, streaming

== Extended plays ==
List of extended plays
Title	Details
Luísa Sonza	Released: 6 October 2017; Label: Universal; Formats: Digital download, streaming
YouTube Music Night (Ao Vivo)	Released: 17 March 2020; Label: Universal; Formats: Digital download, streaming

== Singles ==
=== As lead artist ===
List of singles as lead artist, with selected chart positions and certifications, showing year released and album name
Title	Year	Peak chart positions		Certifications	Album
Title	Year	BRA	POR	Certifications	Album
"Good Vibes"	2017	—	—	PMB: Gold	Luísa Sonza
"Olhos Castanhos"	2017	—	—	PMB: 3× Platinum	Luísa Sonza
"Rebolar"	2018	—	—	PMB: Platinum	Luísa Sonza
"Não Preciso de Você Pra Nada" (with Luan Santana)	2018	—	—	PMB: Gold	Luísa Sonza
"Devagarinho"	2018	— (Note: "Devagarinho" did not enter the Top 100 Brasil chart, but peaked at number 30 on the Pro-Música Brasil Top 50 Top 50 Streaming chart.)	—	PMB: Diamond; AFP: Gold	Non-album singles
"Nunca Foi Sorte"	2018	—	—		Non-album singles
"Boa Menina"	2018	—	—	PMB: Diamond	Non-album singles
"Pior Que Possa Imaginar"	2019	83	—	PMB: 2× Platinum	Pandora
"Fazendo Assim" (with Gaab)	2019	—	—	PMB: Platinum	Pandora
"Bomba Relógio" (with Vitão)	2019	84	—	PMB: Diamond	Pandora
"Garupa" (with Pabllo Vittar)	2019	— (Note: "Garupa" did not enter the Top 100 Brasil chart, but peaked at number 29 on the Pro-Música Brasil Top 50 Top 50 Streaming chart.)	—	PMB: Diamond	Pandora
"Combatchy" (with Anitta & Lexa featuring MC Rebecca)	2019	— (Note: "Combatchy" did not enter the Top 100 Brasil chart, but peaked at number 1 on the Pro-Música Brasil Top 50 Top 50 Streaming chart.)	25	PMB: 2× Diamond; AFP: 2× Platinum	Non-album single
"Não Vou Mais Parar"	2019	—	—		Pandora
"Braba"	2020	66	63	PMB: 4× Diamond; AFP: Platinum	Non-album singles
"Não Vai Embora" (with Dilsinho)	2020	83	—		Non-album singles
"Flores" (with Vitão)	2020	— (Note: "Flores" did not enter the Top 100 Brasil chart, but peaked at number 7 on the Pro-Música Brasil Top 50 Top 50 Streaming chart.)	—	PMB: 2× Diamond; AFP: Platinum	Non-album singles
"Toma" (with MC Zaac)	2020	— (Note: "Toma" did not enter the Top 100 Brasil chart, but peaked at number 17 on the Pro-Música Brasil Top 50 Top 50 Streaming chart.)	175	PMB: Diamond	Non-album singles
"Modo Turbo" (with Pabllo Vittar featuring Anitta)	2020	— (Note: "Modo Turbo" did not enter the Top 100 Brasil chart, but peaked at number 3 on the Pro-Música Brasil Top 50 Streaming chart.)	7	PMB: 3× Diamond; AFP: Platinum	Doce 22
"Cansar Você" (with Thiaguinho)	2021	17	—	PMB: Platinum	Non-album single
"V.I.P" (featuring 6lack)	2021	— (Note: "V.I.P" did not enter the Top 100 Brasil chart, but peaked at number 46 on the Pro-Música Brasil Top 50 Streaming chart.)	115	PMB: Diamond	Doce 22
"Melhor Sozinha" (solo or with Marília Mendonça)	2021	—	187	PMB: Diamond	Doce 22
"Penhasco"	2021	29	58	PMB: 2× Diamond	Doce 22
"Fugitivos" (featuring Jão)	2021	—	—	PMB: Gold	Doce 22
"Anaconda" (featuring Mariah Angeliq)	2021	— (Note: "Anaconda" did not enter the Top 100 Brasil chart, but peaked at number 34 on the Pro-Música Brasil Top 50 Streaming chart.)	79	PMB: Diamond	Doce 22
"Café da Manhã" (featuring Ludmilla)	2022	— (Note: "Café da Manhã" did not enter the Top 100 Brasil chart, but peaked at number 14 on the Brazil Songs)	37	PMB: Diamond	Doce 22
"Sentadona (Remix) s2" (with Davi Kneip, MC Frog & DJ Gabriel do Borel)	2022	— (Note: "Sentadona (Remix)" did not enter the Top 100 Brasil chart, but peaked at number 1 on the Brazil Songs.)	—		Non-album singles
"Cachorrinhas"	2022	— (Note: "Cachorrinhas" did not enter the Top 100 Brasil chart, but peaked at number 2 on the Brazil Songs.)	10	AFP: Gold	Non-album singles
"Mama.cita (Hasta La Vista)" (with Xamã or remix with Karol Conká)	2022	—	35	PMB: 2× Diamond; AFP: Gold	Non-album singles
"Campo de Morango"	2023	— (Note: "Campo de Morango" did not enter the Top 100 Brasil chart, but peaked at number 16 on the Billboard Brasil Hot 100.)	62		Escândalo Íntimo
"Principalmente Me Sinto Arrasada"	2023	— (Note: "Principalmente Me Sinto Arrasada" did not enter the Top 100 Brasil chart, but peaked at number 26 on the Billboard Brasil Hot 100.)	136		Escândalo Íntimo
"Penhasco2" (with Demi Lovato)	2023	— (Note: "Penhasco 2" did not enter the Top 100 Brasil chart, but peaked at number 4 on the Billboard Brasil Hot 100.)	149		Escândalo Íntimo
"Bêbada Favorita" (with Maiara & Maraisa)	2024	—	—		"Escândalo Íntimo" (Deluxe)
"Sagrado Profano" (with Kayblack)	2024	—	1		"Escândalo Íntimo" (Deluxe)
"O Amor Tem Dessas (E é Melhor Assim)"	2024	—	—		"Escândalo Íntimo" (Deluxe)
"You Don't Know Me" (with Caetano Veloso)	2024	—	—		"Escândalo Íntimo" (Deluxe)
"Telefone"	2026	—	—	PMB: Platinum	Brutal Paraíso
"Fruto do Tempo"	2026	—	—		Brutal Paraíso
"—" denotes a recording that did not chart or was not released in that territory.

=== As featured artist ===
List of singles as featured artist, with chart positions and certifications, showing year released and album name
Title	Year	Peak chart positions					Certifications	Album
Title	Year	BRA	MEX	POR	ARG	SPA	Certifications	Album
"Tudo de Bom" (PK featuring Luísa Sonza)	2019	61	—	—	—	—		Non-album singles
"Cavalgada" (Heavy Baile featuring Luísa Sonza)	2019	—	—	—	—	—		Non-album singles
"The Weekend (PrettyMuch featuring Luísa Sonza)	2019	—	—	—	—	—		INTL:EP
"Joga Pra Mim" (Rennan da Penha and 3030 featuring Luísa Sonza)	2020	—	—	—	—	—		Segue o Baile (Ao Vivo)
"Cancêr" (Xamã featuring Luísa Sonza)	2020	—	—	—	—	—		Zodíaco
"Século 21" (Léo Santana featuring Luísa Sonza)	2020	—	—	—	—	—	PMB: 3× Platinum	Paredão do Gigante
"Quebrar Seu Coração" (Lexa featuring Luísa Sonza)	2020	—	—	—	—	—		Lexa
"Friend de Semana" (Danna Paola featuring Luísa Sonza and Aitana)	2020	—	16	—	—	—		K.O.
"Anjo" (Kelly Key featuring Luísa Sonza)	2020	—	—	—	—	—		Do Jeito Delas
"Cry About It Later" (with Katy Perry & Bruno Martini)	2021	—	—	—	—	—		Non-album single
"Atenção" (Pedro Sampaio featuring Luísa Sonza)	2021	— (Note: "Atenção" did not enter the Brasil Hot 100 Airplay chart, but peaked at number 17 on the Pro-Música Brasil Top 50 Streaming chart.)	—	40	—	—	AFP: Platinum	Chama Meu Nome
"Quarto Andar" (As Baías featuring Luísa Sonza)	2021	—	—	—	—	—		Drama Latino
"Tentação" (Carol Biazin featuring Luísa Sonza)	2021	—	—	—	—	—	PMB: Platinum	Beijo de Judas
"Ain't Worried" (Bruno Martini featuring Luísa Sonza and Diarra Sylla)	2021	—	—	—	—	—		Original
"Hotel Caro" (Baco Exu do Blues featuring Luísa Sonza)	2022	10	—	103	—	—		
"Coração Cigano" (Luan Santana featuring Luísa Sonza)	2022	8	—	12	—	—	AFP: Platinum	Luan City (Ao Vivo)
"Poesia Acústica 13" (Pineapple StormTv featuring Chris MC, Salve Malak, Tz da Coronel, MC Cabelinho, Chefin, L7NNON, Luísa Sonza, Oruam, Xamã, N.I.N.A)	2022	—	—	—	—	—	PMB: 2× Diamond	Non-album singles
"Deixa Eu Viver" (Mari Fernandez featuring Luísa Sonza)	2023	76	—	—	—	—		Mari Fernandez Ao Vivo em São Paulo
"Posição de Ataque" (Papatinho featuring Luísa Sonza and DJ Gabriel do Furduncinho)	2023	—	—	—	—	—		Baile do Papato
"Bunda" (Emilia featuring Luísa Sonza)	2024	—	—	—	5	83		Perfectas
"My Oh My" (Kris Kross Amsterdam featuring Luísa Sonza and Willy William	2026	_	_	_	_	_		
"Bloody Paradise" (English version; Enhypen featuring Luísa Sonza)	2026	_	_	_	_	_		

== Other charted and certified songs ==
List of other charted songs, with selected chart positions, showing year released and album name
Title	Year	Peak chart positions			Certifications	Album
Title	Year	BRA Bill.	POR	WW	Certifications	Album
"Interesseira"	2021	—	155	—	PMB: Diamond	Doce 22
"A Dona Aranha"	2023	13	— (Note: "A Dona Aranha" did not enter the Associação Fonográfica Portuguesa chart, but peaked at number 21 on the Portugal Songs.)	—	PMB: 2× Diamond	Escândalo Íntimo
"Carnificina"	2023	43	—	—	PMB: 3× Platinum	Escândalo Íntimo
"Chico"	2023	1	— (Note: "Chico" did not enter the Associação Fonográfica Portuguesa chart, but peaked at number 8 on the Portugal Songs.)	163	PMB: Diamond	Escândalo Íntimo
"Escândalo Íntimo"	2023	88	—	—	PMB: Platinum	Escândalo Íntimo
"Iguaria"	2023	46	—	—	PMB: Diamond	Escândalo Íntimo
"Lança Menina"	2023	66	—	—	PMB: 2× Platinum	Escândalo Íntimo
"Luísa Manequim"	2023	49	—	—	PMB: 2× Platinum	Escândalo Íntimo
"Onde é que deu Errado?"	2023	57	—	—	PMB: 2× Platinum	Escândalo Íntimo
"Outra Vez"	2023	71	—	—	PMB: Platinum	Escândalo Íntimo
"Romance em Cena"	2023	55	—	—	PMB: 2× Platinum	Escândalo Íntimo
"Surreal"	2023	27	—	—	PMB: 2× Diamond	Escândalo Íntimo
