= WME Awards 2021 =

5th edition of the Woman's Music Event Awards

- Date: 16 December 2021
- Location: B32 Theatre; São Paulo, Brazil
- Hosted by: Preta Gil
- Most nominations: Duda Beat (5)
- Website: premio.womensmusicevent.com.br/2021/

Television/radio coverage
- Network: TNT

The WME Awards 2021 were held at the B32 Theatre, in São Paulo, Brazil on 16 December 2021. In partnership with Music2!, the ceremony recognized women in Brazilian music. The ceremony, broadcast by TNT, was hosted by Preta Gil for the fifth consecutive time. Sandra de Sá and Cássia Eller were honored.

== Winners and nominees ==
The nominees were announced on 26 October 2021, by Sarah Oliveira and Day Limns. Duda Beat received the most nominations with five. She is followed by Luísa Sonza with four, while Ludmilla and Marília Mendonça received three nominations each. Winners are listed first and highlighted in bold.

=== Popular vote ===
The winners of the following categories were chosen by fan votes.

Album	Singer
**Indigo Borboleta Anil – Liniker**; Te Amo Lá Fora – Duda Beat; Doce 22 – Luísa Sonza; Numanice – Ludmilla; Cor – Anavitória	**Maiara & Maraisa**; Luísa Sonza; Ludmilla; Majur; Duda Beat
DJ	Alternative Song
**Curol**; Eli Iwassa; Lys Ventura; Badsista; Kennya	**"Meu Pisêro" – Duda Beat**; "Baby 95" – Liniker; "Me Toca" – Marina Sena; "Foi Mal" – Urias; "I Míssil" – Linn da Quebrada
Latam Song	Mainstream Song
**"El Makinón" – Karol G featuring Mariah Angeliq**; "Menos Mierda" – Miss Bolivia featuring Perotá Chingó; "Mafiosa" – Nathy Peluso; "Que Wea" – Paloma Mami; "Noches en Miami" – Natti Natasha	**"Troca de Calçada" – Marília Mendonça**; "Não, Não Vou" – Mari Fernandez; "Gueto" – Iza; "Penhasco" – Luísa Sonza; "Rainha da Favela" – Ludmilla
New Artist	Music Video
**Marina Sena**; MC Dricka; Japinha Conde; Fenda; Bixarte	**"Esqueça-Me Se For Capaz" – Marília Mendonça and Maiara & Maraisa**; "Nem Um Pouquinho" – Duda Beat; "Lama" – Mulamba; "Gueto" – Iza; "Melhor Sozinha" – Luísa Sonza

=== Technical vote ===
The winners of the following categories were chosen by the WME Awards ambassadors.

Songwriter	Music Video Director
**Marília Mendonça**; Juçara Marçal; Carol Biazin; Ana Juh; Duda Beat	**Joyce Prado**; Sabrina Duarte; CeGe (Camila Toun e Gabiru); Gabi Jacob; Cris Streciwik
Music Entrepreneur	Innovation on the Web
**Eliane Dias (Boogie Naipe)**; Arleyde Caldi; Kamila Fialho (K2L); Anita Carvalho (Rio Music Academy); Juli Baldi (Bananas Branding)	**Hervolution**; Music Rio Academy; Phonogram.me; UH Manas TV; Festival Mana
Instrumentalist	Music Journalist
**Silvanny Sivuca**; Ana Karina Sebastião; Josyara; Rayani Martins; Michele Cordeiro	**Fabiane Pereira**; Pérola Mathias; Isabela Yu; Chris Fuscaldo; Kamille Viola
Music Producer	Radio Presenter
**Mahmundi**; Natalia Carreira; Malka; Iasmin Turbininha; Barbara Labres	**Fabiana Ferraz**; Sarah Mascarenhas; Fabiane Pereira; Paula Lima; Valeria Becker
Professional of the Year
**Eliane Dias**; **Ana Morena**; Anita Carvalho; Cris Falcão; Alana Leguth
