= Penhasco =

2021 song by Luísa Sonza

- Acoustic version cover

Promotional single by Luísa Sonza

from the album Doce 22
- Language: Portuguese
- Released: 28 September 2021
- Length: 3:06 (album version); 3:33 (acoustic version)
- Label: Universal Music Brazil
- Songwriters: Luísa Sonza; André Jordão; Carol Biazin; Day Limns; Douglas Moda
- Producers: Moda; We4 Music

"Penhasco" (Note: Officially titled "penhasco.") (Portuguese: [peˈɲasku], transl. "Cliff") is a song recorded by Brazilian singer-songwriter Luísa Sonza, taken from her second studio album Doce 22 (2021). It was written by Sonza along with André Jordão, Carol Biazin, Day Limns and its producers Douglas Moda and We4 Music. The song was released as a promotional single along with its acoustic version on 28 September 2021. In 2023, a continuation of "Penhasco", titled "Penhasco2", was released, in collaboration with American singer-songwriter Demi Lovato, for Sonza's third studio album Escândalo Íntimo (2023).

== Background and composition ==
Brazilian singer-songwriter Luísa Sonza and Brazilian comedian and actor Whindersson Nunes got married in February 2018, and announced their separation two years later, in April 2020. Inspired by her split with Nunes, "Penhasco" was written by Sonza, Douglas Moda, Day Limns, Carol Biazin and André Jordão. Sonza said that the song was the most difficult to write, stating: "It's the hardest I've ever written, I feel proud that I managed to turn this very difficult phase of my life into music."

== Release and promotion ==
"Penhasco" was released through Universal Music Brazil on 18 July 2021, as the eleventh track from Sonza's second studio album, Doce 22. As part of the promotion, a lyric video was released on 28 July 2021. The video was inspired by an interview by writer Clarice Lispector on TV Cultura's Panorama program in 1977. An acoustic version of the song was released on 28 September 2021.

== Charts ==
Weekly chart performance for "Penhasco"
Chart (2021)	Peak position
Portugal (AFP)	58

== Certifications ==
Certifications for "Penhasco"
Region	Certification	Certified units/sales
Brazil (Pro-Música Brasil)	2× Diamond	600,000^{‡}
^{‡} Sales+streaming figures based on certification alone.

== Release history ==
Release dates and formats for "Penhasco"
Region	Date	Format	Version	Label	Ref.
Various	29 August 2023	Digital download; streaming	Acoustic	Universal Music Brazil	
