= Penhasco2 =

2023 song by Luísa Sonza and Demi Lovato

Single by Luísa Sonza and Demi Lovato

from the album Escândalo Íntimo
- Language: Portuguese
- Released: 29 August 2023
- Length: 2:53
- Label: Sony Brazil
- Songwriters: Luísa Sonza; Demi Lovato; Carol Biazin; Carolzinha; Day Limns; Douglas Moda; Jenni Mosello; Papatinho; Roy Lenzo
- Producers: Moda; Papatinho; Lenzo

Luísa Sonza singles chronology
"Principalmente Me Sinto Arrasada" (2023)	"Penhasco2" (2023)	"Sou Musa do Verão" (2023)

Demi Lovato singles chronology
"Eve, Psyche & the Bluebeard's Wife" (remix) (2023)	"Penhasco2" (2023)	"Chula" (2024)

Music video
- "Penhasco2" on YouTube

"Penhasco2" (Portuguese: [peˈɲasku ˈdojs], transl. "Cliff 2") is a song by Brazilian singer-songwriter Luísa Sonza and American singer-songwriter Demi Lovato, present in the former's third studio album, Escândalo Íntimo (2023). The song was released as the third single from the album on the same day of release, 29 August 2023, through Sony Music Brazil. The artists wrote the song along with Carol Biazin, Carolzinha, Day Limns, Jenni Mosello, and its producers Douglas Moda, Papatinho and Roy Lenzo. Sung entirely in Portuguese language, it is a continuation of "Penhasco", a track on Sonza's 2021 album Doce 22.

A Diego Fraga-directed music video for "Penhasco2" premiered on 12 September 2023, in which Sonza appears walking and watching a bed on fire. Both Sonza and Lovato performed the song at the first edition of The Town Festival in Brazil and at the 2024 Billboard Women in Music event. Commercially, "Penhasco2" peaked at number four on the Brasil Hot 100, published by Billboard Brasil. It marked Sonza's highest-peaking song at the time and Lovato's first appearance on the chart, and was later certified Diamond by Pro-Música Brasil. Elsewhere, it charted at number 11 in Portugal and at number 107 on the Billboard Global Excl. US chart.

== Background ==
Luísa Sonza released her second studio album, Doce 22, on 18 July 2021, which contains the song "Penhasco", the eleventh song on the tracklist, inspired by her split with Whindersson Nunes. "Penhasco", written by Sonza, Douglas Moda, Day, Carol Biazin and André Jordão, was Sonza's most difficult song to write, stating: "It's the hardest I've ever written. I feel proud for having managed to transform this phase so difficult part of my life in music". In an interview for GNT's Saia Justa program, Sonza confirmed the release of a continuation of the song. In response to a comment on social media, the singer said: "'Penhasco' is not about any ex, it's about me and my feelings about what I lived and how I felt. And even if it were, I already warn that "Penhasco 2" has nothing to do with the (real and personal) story of Penhasco. Only the two have the same 'vibe'."

Rumors about a possible collaboration between Demi Lovato and Sonza began in August 2023, when the American singer followed the Brazilian singer on Instagram, and she liked the post of the album announcement of Escândalo Íntimo. The continuation of "Penhasco", with Lovato, was announced on 29 August, the same day of the release of the album, via Sonza's social media. She also posted old tweets of her praising Lovato's songs and talent as a throwback.

== Commercial performance ==
"Penhasco2" broke the record of the song with the most streams in its debut in the history of Spotify Brazil at the time, with more than two million. With only two days of tracking, the song debuted at number 21 on the Billboard Brasil Hot 100, becoming the album's highest debut on the chart. It later peaked at number four in the country, and entered the Billboard Global Excl. US, marking Sonza's seventh appearance on the chart.

== Music video ==
A music video for "Penhasco2" was released on 12 September 2023 through Sonza's Vevo channel; it does not contain Lovato's participation. In the video directed by Diego Fraga, Sonza appears shaken and crying while walking and watching a bed on fire; media publications draw comparisons between "Penhasco2" and the video for the lead single from the album, "Campo de Morango".

== Live performances ==
The two performed the song live for the first time in Lovato's set at the first edition of The Town Festival, on 2 September 2023. There was already expectation from the fans about the live performance, since a video of the singers rehearsing the song on the Skyline stage, a day before, was published on social networks. Before inviting Luísa to the stage, Lovato made clear the pleasure it was to participate in Sonza's project. The singers also performed "Penhasco2" at the 2024 edition of the Billboard Women in Music annual event.

== Charts ==
Chart performance for "Penhasco2"
Chart (2023)	Peak position
Brazil Hot 100 (Billboard)	4
Global Excl. US (Billboard)	107
Portugal (AFP)	11

== Certifications ==
Region	Certification	Certified units/sales
Brazil (Pro-Música Brasil)	Diamond	160,000^{‡}
^{‡} Sales+streaming figures based on certification alone.

== Release history ==
Release dates and formats for "Penhasco2"
Region	Date	Format	Label	Ref.
Various	29 August 2023	Digital download; streaming	Sony Music Brazil	
