= Chula (song) =

2024 single by Grupo Firme and Demi Lovato

Single by Grupo Firme and Demi Lovato
- Language: Spanish; English
- Released: August 15, 2024
- Genre: Dance-pop
- Length: 2:30
- Label: Music VIP
- Composers: Sean Douglas; Demi Lovato; Oak; Oscar Linnander
- Lyricists: Eduin Caz; Luis Mexia; Manuel Orozco; Pablo Preciado
- Producers: Oak; Oscar Linnander; Sheeno

Grupo Firme singles chronology
"Domperi" (2024)	"Chula" (2024)	"Qué Fuimos (En Vivo)" (2024)

Demi Lovato singles chronology
"Penhasco2" (2023)	"Chula" (2024)	"Fast" (2025)

Lyric video
- "Chula" on YouTube

"Chula" is a song by Mexican band Grupo Firme and American singer Demi Lovato, released through Music VIP Entertainment on August 15, 2024. It was written by Lovato, Eduin Caz, Luis Mexia, Manuel Orozco, Warren "Oak" Felder, Oscar Linnander, Pablo Preciado, and Sean Douglas, while Felder, Linnander, and Sheeno handled its production. Before its official announcement, both acts premiered the song at a concert in Austin, Texas, as part of the group's La Última Peda concert tour. "Chula" is a Spanglish dance-pop track, which marked a departure from Lovato's rock-infused sound.

== Background ==
At the end of July 2024, after being asked for new music, American singer Demi Lovato teased the release of a song on social media with a video that she captioned, "Say you're ready but I bet you not", quoting the lyrics of the then-upcoming song. In response to the video, the regional Mexican band Grupo Firme wrote three emojis in the comments, hinting at a possible collaboration. Billboard asked the group's leader Eduin Caz about a feature between the two acts, and he said, "Demi Lovato is an artist whom we've admired since we were kids". "We would watch her on television", he continued, and showed his admiration for the artist. He concluded by saying, "Luckily the collaboration happened and the song is really good".

On August 2, 2024, at the Austin, Texas stop to the La Última Peda Tour, a concert tour by Grupo Firme, Lovato appeared by surprise to perform a new song with the frontman of the group, Caz. Titled "Chula", it marked the first collaboration between the two acts, and the third single by Lovato with a Latin artist, following her 2017 single "Échame la Culpa" with Puerto Rican singer Luis Fonsi and her 2023 "Penhasco2" with Brazilian singer-songwriter Luísa Sonza. While they were singing the song, screens announced its release date for August 15, 2024. A post shared on Grupo Firme's TikTok account showed Lovato and Caz doing a soundcheck before the surprise performance. On August 24, 2024, Lovato performed the song for the second time at the Festival Hera HSBC in Mexico.

== Recording and composition ==
After Lovato expressed interest in recording a bilingual song, she met the group, distributor mates, in a studio in Los Angeles. "Chula" was written by Lovato, Caz, Luis Mexia, Manuel Orozco, Warren "Oak" Felder, Oscar Linnander, Pablo Preciado, and Sean Douglas, while Felder, Linnander, and Sheeno handled its production. A dance-pop track with elements of Mexican and electronic music, it marked Lovato's return to pop music following her previous two rock albums, Holy Fvck (2022) and Revamped (2023). "Chula" also was a departure from Grupo Firme's usual musical style. In an interview with Rolling Stone's Tomás Mier, the Spanish and Native American descent singer said, "That's what I love about singing in Spanish: It goes back to my literal roots".

== Reception ==
"Chula" received positive reviews upon its release. Describing it as a "electrifying duo", Johan Sebastián Gómez Rojas from RCN Radio said that "Chula" marked a milestone in Grupo Firme's career, and said that they made a "irresistible fusion of styles and cultures". While adding the song to its list of New Music Picks, Univision predicted that "it will definitely light up the dance floors". La Prensa dubbed "Chula" as a "contagious song that invites the public to dance", and praised Lovato's powerful vocals.

== Charts ==
Chart performance for "Chula"
Chart (2024)	Peak position
US Latin Digital Song Sales (Billboard)	2
US Latin Pop Airplay (Billboard)	10

== Certifications ==
Certifications for "Chula"
Region	Certification	Certified units/sales
United States (RIAA)	Gold (Latin)	30,000^{‡}
^{‡} Sales+streaming figures based on certification alone.
