= Melhor Sozinha =

- Marília Mendonça remix

Single by Luísa Sonza
- Language: Portuguese
- Released: 18 July 2021
- Genre: Pop; bolero
- Length: 3:47
- Label: Universal Music Brazil
- Songwriters: Luísa Sonza; Carol Biazin; Vitão; Douglas Moda; Nave
- Producer: We4 Music

Luísa Sonza singles chronology
| "VIP" (2021) | "Melhor Sozinha" (2021) | "Fugitivos" (2021) |

Music video
- "Melhor Sozinha" on YouTube

"Melhor Sozinha" (Note: stylized as "melhor sozinha :-)-:") (Portuguese: [meˈʎɔʁ soˈziɲɐ]; transl. "Better Alone") is a song by Brazilian singer-songwriter Luísa Sonza, recorded for her second studio album Doce 22 (2021). The song was released on July 18, 2021, as the album's second single, simultaneously with the track "VIP". A remix featuring Brazilian singer-songwriter Marília Mendonça was released on August 22, 2021.

== Lyrics and composition ==
"Melhor Sozinha" was composed by the performer together with Carol Biazin, Vitão, Douglas Moda and Nave, being produced by We4 Music. In the lyrics, Sonza talks about the insecurity of believing in another love relationship and how she feels better alone, even though she still has love for the other inside her.

== Music video ==
The original music video was released on July 18, 2021, with exclusivity on the Fantástico program. The singer signs the script and creative direction of music video, which were also directed by the artist alongside João Monteiro.

The music video version featuring Marília Mendonça was recorded in Goiânia and released on August 22, 2021. The video has a relaxed aesthetic between Sonza and Mendonça, who while talking, drink wine and beer.

== Live performance ==
Sonza performed the song for the first time on July 18, 2021, at Fantástico. On August 11, 2021, at Encontro com Fátima Bernardes. On September 7, Sonza performed the song on the eighth season of Música Boa Ao Vivo. On September 23, Sonza performed the song at the 2021 MTV Millennial Awards.

== Certifications ==
Certifications for "Melhor Sozinha"
| Region | Certification | Certified units/sales |
|---|---|---|
| Brazil (Pro-Música Brasil) | 2× Diamond | 600,000^{‡} |
^{‡} Sales+streaming figures based on certification alone.

== Release history ==
Release dates and formats for "Melhor Sozinha"
| Region | Date | Format | Version | Label | Ref. |
|---|---|---|---|---|---|
| Various | 18 July 2021 | digital download; streaming | Original | Universal Music Brazil | |
| Various | 23 August 2021 | digital download; streaming | Marília Mendonça remix | Universal Music Brazil | |
