= Chico (Luísa Sonza song) =

2023 single by Luísa Sonza

- English version cover

Single by Luísa Sonza

from the album Escândalo Íntimo
- Language: Portuguese
- Released: 29 August 2023
- Genre: Bossa nova
- Length: 3:02
- Label: Sony Brazil
- Songwriters: Luísa Sonza; Bruno Caliman; Carolzinha; Douglas Moda; Jenni Mosello
- Producers: Douglas Moda; We4 Music

Visualizer
- "Chico" on YouTube

"Chico" (Portuguese: [ˈʃiku]) is a song recorded by Brazilian singer-songwriter Luísa Sonza, included on her third studio album, Escândalo Íntimo (2023). The song was released as a single in tandem with the album, on 29 August 2023. The artist wrote it along with Bruno Caliman, Carolzinha, Jenni Mosello and Douglas Moda, and the latter produced it with We4 Music. An English version of the song was released on 7 March 2024.

The song became Sonza's first number-one single on the Brasil Hot 100, published by Billboard Brasil magazine. It also reached the top five in Portugal, and charted on the Billboard Global 200 at number 163.

== Background and release ==
Brazilian singer Luísa Sonza announced her third studio album, titled Escândalo Íntimo, on 9 August 2023, stating that it was about "love stories that went wrong". On the same day, she posted on social media a distorted photo with song titles that could be part of the project, and speculation claimed that one song would be titled "Chico". It was officially announced days later, as the eleventh track on the album. A visualizer for the song was released on 8 September 2023. An English version of "Chico" was announced on 5 March 2024, and released two days after.

== Composition ==
"Chico" is a bossa nova song with a length of three minutes and two seconds.

== Live performances ==
Sonza performed the song for the first time at the 2024 The Town Festival. Months later, she performed the English version of "Chico", interlaced with original Portuguese lyrics, at the 2024 edition of the Billboard Women in Music annual event.

== Credits and personnel ==
Credits are adapted from Tidal.

- Luísa Sonza – lead vocals, composition
- Douglas Moda – composition, production
- Jenni Mosello – composition
- Carolzinha – composition
- Bruno Caliman – composition
- Natália Ferlin – executive production
- Enrico Romano – edition
- Arthur Luna – master engineer, mixer
- Jonathan "Yoni" Asperil – recording engineer

== Charts ==
Weekly chart performance for "Chico"
Chart (2023)	Peak position
Brazil Hot 100 (Billboard)	1
Global 200 (Billboard)	163
Portugal (AFP)	5
