= Escândalo Íntimo =

2023 studio album by Luísa Sonza

Studio album by Luísa Sonza
- Released: 29 August 2023
- Recorded: April 2023
- Genre: Pop
- Length: 45:51
- Languages: Portuguese; Spanish; English
- Label: Sony Music Brazil
- Producers: Douglas Moda; Tommy Brown; Roy Lenzo; Jonathan "Yoni" Asperil; Jahnei Clarke

Luísa Sonza chronology
Doce 22 (2021)	Escândalo Íntimo (2023)	Bossa Sempre Nova (2026)

Deluxe edition
- Escândalo Íntimo (deluxe) cover

Singles from Escândalo Íntimo
- 1. "Campo de Morango" Released: 15 August 2023; 2. "Principalmente Me Sinto Arrasada" Released: 23 August 2023; 3. "Penhasco2" Released: 29 August 2023; 4. "Chico" Released: 29 August 2023; 5. "La Muerte" Released: 14 November 2023

Escândalo Íntimo (Portuguese: [isˈkɐ̃dalu ˈĩtʃimu]; Intimate Scandal) is the third studio album by Brazilian singer Luísa Sonza. The album was released on August 29, 2023, through the record label Sony Music. The project was recorded in studios located in Brazil and the United States. The album features guest appearances by Marina Sena, Baco Exu do Blues, Duda Beat, Maiara & Maraisa, KayBlack and Demi Lovato.

Upon release, Escândalo Íntimo received generally positive reviews from music critics, who praised Sonza's maturity as an artist and the album's concept, depth and production, and gained 15.6 million streams in its first 24 hours of availability on Spotify, breaking the record for the biggest debut for an album in the history of Spotify Brazil, surpassing Super, by Jão. All of the album's tracks were positioned among the 50 most listened to songs on the platform, including six of them, "Penhasco2", "Campo de Morango", "A Dona Aranha", "Surreal", "Chico" and "Carnificina", present in the Top 10. Sonza was the most played artist in Brazil and 18th in the world.

A week after its release, "Chico" reached the top of all audio platforms in Brazil – being the first bossa nova to achieve this feat – and led Sonza to reach its highest entry in Spotify's Global Top 50, after the song reached 27th position. It was the fastest Brazilian album to reach 100 million streams and the album with the highest number of streams per day.

== Background ==
In December 2022, with the release of the single "Mamacita (Hasta La Vista)", a collaboration with rapper Xamã, Sonza revealed she was getting prepared for the release of the album.

"Next year (2023) I want to make a great album. I am a singer, but I feel much more like a performer of my own life and the album always allows me to tell a little more and in more depth all my feelings, experiences and stories".

— Sonza on Escândalo Íntimo, Estadão.

In April 2023, she announced the end of the "O Conto dos Dois Mundos" tour and that she would focus more on the production of her new project, stating that a part would be recorded in the United States. In March, photos in Los Angeles were posted on her social media accounts, where she met several North American musicians, such as Timbaland, Tommy Brown and Njomza.

In July, Sonza participated in a chat with her fans on Twitter, where she revealed that there were twenty-eight songs ready, but that not all of them would make the final version of the album. She also mentioned that it would have more sensual and explicit music, as well as songs in other languages, and that part of the musical production would be done by Brown. Douglas Moda, one of the producers of her previous album, Doce 22, was also confirmed to be one of the producers of the new album. According to Sonza, the project translates to a "crazy trip inside my head".

== Release and promotion ==
On 9 August 2023, a live broadcast was made by Sonza on Rodovia Régis Bittencourt, where there was a billboard revealing the title, release date and cover of the album. Hours later, she made a post on her social media accounts talking about Escândalo Íntimo.

"[...] This album is about love stories that went wrong, above all, me with myself. Nightmares. A self-analysis of an abusive relationship, rather with me than with others, which I only discovered in the middle of the whole process. How stupid of me to think that anyone other than me was to blame for everything I did to myself".

— Sonza about the album.

Two days after the event, Sonza posted a video on the Instagram account @farm003 created by herself to promote the album, which shows her with a bleeding wound on her head, watery eyes and staring at the camera with a mysterious track playing. The next day, the lead single, "Campo de Morango", was announced, with pictures showing the singer all stained in red on top of a bed, full of strawberries, in the middle of an open field, which is where the music video was shot. The single was released on 15 August along with its accompanying music video.

== Critical reception ==
Professional ratings
Review scores
Source	Rating
Escutai	73/100
Folha de S.Paulo	3/5 stars

Dora Guerra from the newspaper Estadão stated that Escândalo Íntimo "is a business card album, which exposes the artist's versatility when moving from rock to funk, from slowness to speed. It shows that Luísa is capable of making a good conceptual pop album. [...] Without her having to, all the time, 'prove that she is an artist'". Laura Bragança and Marcos Vinícius from the Escutai website stated that the paths taken by the artist were interesting, but that in many moments, it lacked originality: "due to an erroneous popular value judgment of what “real music” would be, the singer seems to try to fit in poetic and metaphorical language, typical of MPB". Luiza Missi from the Splash website ends her review by stating that "the work is yet another opportunity to analyze the life of the singer, who this time put herself under the microscope of public opinion on purpose". The critic Felipe Maia of the Folha de S.Paulo newspaper reviews that Sonza "gets it right when he gets it wrong" and that "songs orbit between melancholy and hope".

== Commercial performance ==
Escândalo Íntimo broke Jão's record with his album Super, and it was became the most streamed album on the first day in Spotify Brazil.

== Accolades ==
Awards and nominations for Escândalo Íntimo
Year	Organization	Category	Result	Ref.
2024	Latin Grammy Awards	Best Portuguese Language Contemporary Pop Album	Nominated	

== Track listing ==
Standard edition track listing
No.	Title	Lyrics	Music	Producer(s)	Length
1.	"Escândalo Íntimo"		Beto Ruschel; Hareton Salvanini	Douglas Moda; Carlos Bezerra	0:59
2.	"Carnificina"	Luísa Sonza; Carolina Marcílio; Jenni Mosello	Douglas Moda; Roy Lenzo; Tk Kayembe; Ariana Wong; Jonathan Asperil	Moda; Lenzo; Yoni Asperil; Wong; Kayembe	2:20
3.	"A Dona Aranha"	Sonza; Carolzinha; Mosello	Moda; Tommy Brown; Marquez Parker; Njomza Vitia; Courageous Xavier Herrera	Brown; Xavi; Moda; Parker	2:04
4.	"Luísa Manequim"	Sonza; Carolzinha; Mosello	Abílio Manoel; Asa Taccone; Carolzinha; Cole Marsden; Greif Neill; Moda; Mosello; Sonza	Taccone; Moda; Cole MGN	2:29
5.	"Interlúdio – Todas as Histórias"	Sonza	Carolzinha; Iuri Rio Branco; Mosello; Lucas Vaz; Sonza; Marina Sena; Nave	Moda	0:29
6.	"Romance em Cena" (with Marina Sena)	Sonza; Carolzinha; Mosello	Carolzinha; Iuri Rio Branco; Mosello; Lucas Vaz; Sonza; Marina Sena; Nave	Vaz; Rio Branco	3:08
7.	"Campo de Morango"	Sonza; Carolzinha; Mosello	Carolzinha; Moda; Jahnei Clarke; Mosello; Vaz; Sonza; Mason Sacks; Lenzo	Lenzo; Moda; Sacks; Clarke	1:16
8.	"Surreal" (with Baco Exu do Blues)	Sonza; Carolzinha; Mosello	Wong; Diogo Moncorvo; Carolzinha; Moda; Clarke; Mosello; Sonza; Lenzo; Tk Kayembe; Jonathan Yoni Asperil	Clarke; Yoni Asperil; Kayembe; Wong; Lenzo; Moda	3:54
9.	"Iguaria"	Sonza; Carolzinha; Mosello	Carolzinha; Moda; Clarke; Mosello; Sonza; Sacks; Lenzo; Kayembe	Sacks; Clarke; Lenzo; Kayembe; Moda	3:42
10.	"Chico"	Sonza; Carolzinha; Mosello	Bruno Caliman; Carolzinha; Moda; Mosello; Sonza	Moda	3:02
11.	"Onde é Que Deu Errado?"	Sonza; Aisha	Aisha; André Jordão; Caliman; Dan Ferreira; Moda; Sonza	Moda	3:44
12.	"Penhasco2" (with Demi Lovato)	Sonza; Carolzinha; Mosello	Carol Biazin; Carolzinha; Day Limns; Demetria Lovato; Moda; Mosello; Sonza; Papatinho; Lenzo	Papatinho; Moda; Lenzo	2:53
13.	"Outra Vez"	Sonza; Aisha	Aisha; André Jordão; Carlos Bezerra; Dan Ferreira; Moda; Sonza	Moda; Bezerra	3:29
14.	"Interlúdio – Dão Errado"	Sonza	Vanessa da Mata	Moda	2:12
15.	"Principalmente Me Sinto Arrasada"	Sonza; Carolzinha; Mosello	Wong; Carolzinha; Moda; Clarke; Mosello; Sonza; Lenzo; Yoni Asperil	Yoni Asperil; Wong; Moda; Lenzo	2:53
16.	"Ana Maria" (with Duda Beat)	Sonza; Carolzinha; Mosello	Wong; Carolzinha; Moda; Clarke; Mosello; Sonza; Sacks; Lenzo; Yoni Asperil	Lenzo; Yoni Asperil; Moda; Clarke; Wong	2:35
17.	"Lança Menina"	Sonza; Carolzinha; Mosello	Carolzinha; Moda; Clarke; Mosello; Sonza; Sacks; Rita Lee; Roberto de Carvalho; Lenzo; Kayembe; Yoni Asperil	Lenzo; Yoni Asperil; Kayembe; Sacks	1:57
18.	"Não Sou Demais"	Sonza; Aisha	Aisha; Jordão; Caliman; Bezerra; Moda; Sonza	Moda; Bezerra	2:45

Deluxe edition track listing
No.	Title	Lyrics	Music	Producer(s)	Length
1.	"Escândalo Íntimo"		Beto Ruschel; Hareton Salvanini	Douglas Moda; Carlos Bezerra	0:59
2.	"Carnificina"	Luísa Sonza; Carolina Marcílio; Jenni Mosello	Douglas Moda; Roy Lenzo; Tk Kayembe; Ariana Wong; Jonathan Asperil	Moda; Lenzo; Yoni Asperil; Wong; Kayembe	2:20
3.	"A Dona Aranha"	Sonza; Carolzinha; Mosello	Moda; Tommy Brown; Marquez Parker; Njomza Vitia; Courageous Xavier Herrera	Brown; Xavi; Moda; Parker	2:04
4.	"Luísa Manequim"	Sonza; Carolzinha; Mosello	Abílio Manoel; Asa Taccone; Carolzinha; Cole Marsden; Greif Neill; Moda; Mosello; Sonza	Taccone; Moda; Cole MGN	2:29
5.	"Bêbada Favorita" (with Maiara & Maraisa)	Sonza; Carolzinha; Mosello	Moda; E. Nazareth; Pep	Moda; Pep	3:00
6.	"Interlúdio – Todas as Histórias"	Sonza	Carolzinha; Iuri Rio Branco; Mosello; Lucas Vaz; Sonza; Marina Sena; Nave	Moda	0:29
7.	"Romance em Cena" (with Marina Sena)	Sonza; Carolzinha; Mosello	Carolzinha; Iuri Rio Branco; Mosello; Lucas Vaz; Sonza; Marina Sena; Nave	Vaz; Rio Branco	3:08
8.	"Campo de Morango"	Sonza; Carolzinha; Mosello	Carolzinha; Moda; Jahnei Clarke; Mosello; Vaz; Sonza; Mason Sacks; Lenzo	Lenzo; Moda; Sacks; Clarke	1:16
9.	"Surreal" (with Baco Exu do Blues)	Sonza; Carolzinha; Mosello	Wong; Diogo Moncorvo; Carolzinha; Moda; Clarke; Mosello; Sonza; Lenzo; Tk Kayembe; Jonathan Yoni Asperil	Clarke; Yoni Asperil; Kayembe; Wong; Lenzo; Moda	3:54
10.	"Iguaria"	Sonza; Carolzinha; Mosello	Carolzinha; Moda; Clarke; Mosello; Sonza; Sacks; Lenzo; Kayembe	Sacks; Clarke; Lenzo; Kayembe; Moda	3:42
11.	"Chico"	Sonza; Carolzinha; Mosello	Bruno Caliman; Carolzinha; Moda; Mosello; Sonza	Moda	3:02
12.	"Sagrado Profano" (with KayBlack)	Sonza; KayBlack; Carolzinha; Mosello	Clarke; Lenzo; Wong; Yoni	Moda; Clarke; Lenzo	3:18
13.	"Interlúdio - De Amor"	Sonza	Sonza; Daramola; Rose; Tokischa	Daramola	1:49
14.	"La Muerte" (with Tokischa)	Sonza; Rose; Tokischa	Daramola	Daramola	2:35
15.	"O Amor Tem Dessas (E é Melhor Assim)"	Sonza	C. Roque; E. Dara; P. Valle; R. RSQ	RSQ	2:55
16.	"Onde é Que Deu Errado?"	Sonza; Aisha	Aisha; André Jordão; Caliman; Dan Ferreira; Moda; Sonza	Moda	3:44
17.	"Penhasco2" (with Demi Lovato)	Sonza; Carolzinha; Mosello	Carol Biazin; Carolzinha; Day Limns; Demetria Lovato; Moda; Mosello; Sonza; Papatinho; Lenzo	Papatinho; Moda; Lenzo	2:53
18.	"Outra Vez"	Sonza; Aisha	Aisha; André Jordão; Carlos Bezerra; Dan Ferreira; Moda; Sonza	Moda; Bezerra	3:29
19.	"Interlúdio – Dão Errado"	Sonza	Vanessa da Mata	Moda	2:12
20.	"Principalmente Me Sinto Arrasada"	Sonza; Carolzinha; Mosello	Wong; Carolzinha; Moda; Clarke; Mosello; Sonza; Lenzo; Yoni Asperil	Yoni Asperil; Wong; Moda; Lenzo	2:53
21.	"Ana Maria" (with Duda Beat)	Sonza; Carolzinha; Mosello	Wong; Carolzinha; Moda; Clarke; Mosello; Sonza; Sacks; Lenzo; Yoni Asperil	Lenzo; Yoni Asperil; Moda; Clarke; Wong	2:35
22.	"Lança Menina"	Sonza; Carolzinha; Mosello	Carolzinha; Moda; Clarke; Mosello; Sonza; Sacks; Rita Lee; Roberto de Carvalho; Lenzo; Kayembe; Yoni Asperil	Lenzo; Yoni Asperil; Kayembe; Sacks	1:57
23.	"Não Sou Demais"	Sonza; Aisha	Aisha; Jordão; Caliman; Bezerra; Moda; Sonza	Moda; Bezerra	2:45
24.	"You Don't Know Me"		C. Veloso; Aisha; Jordão; Caliman; Bezerra; Moda; Sonza	Moda; We4 Music; Vini Nallon	2:55

Notes

- "Intro: Escândalo Íntimo" contains a sample of "Quarto de Hotel" by Hareton Salvanini (1974).
- "Luísa Manequim" contains a sample of "Luiza Manequim" by Abílio Manoel (1972).

== Charts ==
Chart performance for Escândalo Íntimo
Chart (2023–2024)	Peak position
Irish Albums (IRMA)	78
Portuguese Albums (AFP)	13

== Certifications ==
Certifications for Escândalo Íntimo
Region	Certification	Certified units/sales
Brazil (Pro-Música Brasil)	2× Diamond	600,000^{‡}
^{‡} Sales+streaming figures based on certification alone.

== Release history ==
Release dates and formats for Escândalo Íntimo
Region	Date	Format	Label	Ref.
Various	29 August 2023	Digital download; streaming	Sony	
