= Anaconda (Luísa Sonza song) =

Single by Luísa Sonza with Mariah Angeliq

from the album Doce 22
- Language: Portuguese; Spanish
- Released: 9 December 2021
- Genre: Pop; Latin trap
- Length: 3:03
- Label: Universal
- Songwriters: Luísa Sonza; Mariah Angeliq; Aisha; Carol Biazin; Day; Jenni Mosello; King; Lucas Vaz; Play-N-Skillz; Reggi El Autentico; Renato Frei
- Producer: Lucas Vaz

Luísa Sonza singles chronology
"Fugitivos" (2021)	"Anaconda" (2021)	"Café da Manhã" (2022)

Mariah Angeliq singles chronology
"Socadona" (2021)	"Anaconda" (2021)	"La Tóxica" (2022)

Music video
- "Anaconda" on YouTube

"Anaconda" (stylized as "ANACONDA *o* ~~") is a song by Brazilian singer Luísa Sonza and American singer Mariah Angeliq, recorded for Sonza's second studio album, Doce 22 (2021). It was released as the album's fourth single on 9 December 2021, through Universal Music Brasil.

== Background and release ==
According to Sonza, "Anaconda" is "a special song that has gone through many transformations. "So have I. I started it two years ago on the day I made "Braba", "VIP" and "Toma". I left it there. It took a while to mature, it aged like a wine (laughs). And it provoked me somewhere... I thought the lyrics were different, from an aggressive feminine that instigated me".

Later, she decided to rework the song: "I decided: 'You know what, I'm going to do it myself'. So I called Jenni and Lucas in the studio, because nobody does anything alone and I'm very open to ideas". At the release of Doce 22, "Anaconda", along with two other tracks, was blocked for listening on streaming platforms, and was released on 8 December 2021, as the fourth single from the album, by Universal Music Brazil.

== Music video ==
The music video for "Anaconda" was released on 9 December 2021 through YouTube.

== Live performance ==
Sonza performed "Anaconda" in a medley with other songs from Doce 22 at the 2021 Multishow Brazilian Music Awards on the same day as the track's release

Before starting to sing "Anaconda", you can hear what sounds like the singer speaking in reverse, in a coded message. Fans and netizens quickly discovered the message, which read as follows: "Your poison has made me stronger so far. But I don't know to what extent this poison will make me stronger or kill me".

== Charts ==
=== Weekly charts ===
Weekly chart performance for "Anaconda"
Chart (2022)	Peak position
Portugal (AFP)	79

=== Year-end charts ===
Year-end chart performance for "Anaconda"
Chart (2022)	Position
Brazil (Pro-Música Brasil)	89

== Certifications ==
Certifications for Anaconda
Region	Certification	Certified units/sales
Brazil (Pro-Música Brasil)	2× Diamond	600,000^{‡}
^{‡} Sales+streaming figures based on certification alone.

== Release history ==
Release history for "Anaconda"
Region	Date	Format(s)	Label	Ref.
Various	9 December 2021	Digital download; streaming	Universal Brazil	
