= Giannini (guitar company) =

Musical instrument manufacturer

Giannini Musical Instruments Corporation
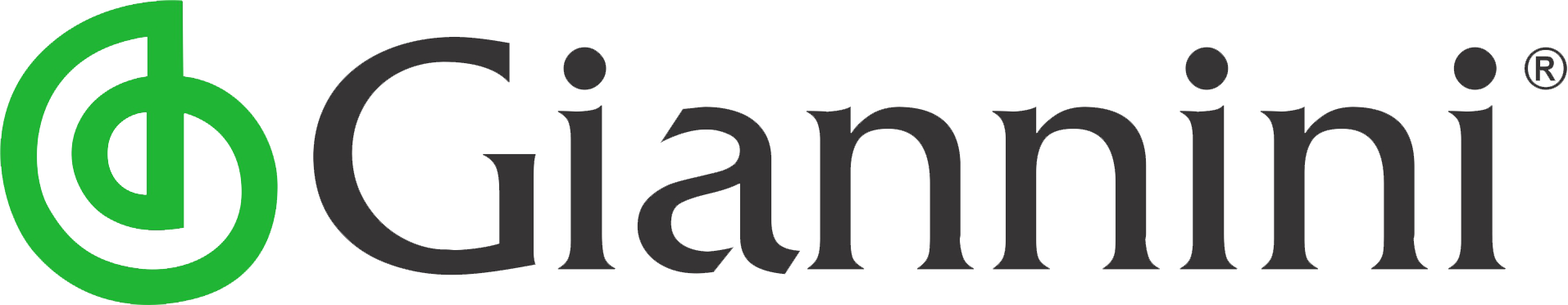
- Company type: Private
- Industry: Musical instruments
- Founded: 1900; 126 years ago in São Paulo
- Founder: Tranquillo Giannini
- Headquarters: Salto, São Paulo, Brazil
- Products: Electric, acoustic, classical guitars, basses, craviolas, cavaquinhos, viola caipiras, mandolins, violins, cellos, double basses, strings
- Website: giannini.com.br

Giannini is a Brazilian musical instruments manufacturing company, based in Salto, São Paulo.

Products currently manufactured by Giannini include electric, steel-string acoustic, nylon-string acoustic and bass guitars. Other string instruments include craviolas, cavaquinhos, viola caipiras and mandolins. Giannini also manufactures bowed string instruments such as violins, cellos and double basses, and strings for those instruments.

== History ==
The company was founded in 1900 by Tranquillo Giannini (1876–1952), an Italian immigrant with luthier talents. Their first industrial plant was located at Av. Sao Joao in the city of São Paulo.

Today, Giannini's plant is located at Salto, a city in the state of São Paulo (not far from the capital). They currently produce nylon and steel stringed guitars, craviola, viola caipira, cavaquinho, mandolin, violins, electric guitars and basses and some accessories such as guitar tuners and guitar strings.

== Craviola ==
The Craviola, created by Giannini with Brazilian musician Paulinho Nogueira is one of the most notable guitars made by Giannini due to its unique shape and sound identity. It gained widespread visibility after it was used by Led Zeppelin's guitarist Jimmy Page. From September 1971 to June 1972, Page used a 12-string craviola, model GWSCRA12-P, mostly in Zeppelin's performances of "Tangerine", which was also first recorded using the same craviola. Page received two craviolas (one with six strings and the other, by his request, with twelve) from Giannini itself as gifts, while visiting his NGO at Rio de Janeiro.

The Craviola also received an electric version with Wilkinson pickups. The guitar's wiring has one 3-position key for each of the pickups, which allow them to work with one coil, the other one, both as a humbucker or both separately as single coils, giving a wide range of possible timbres, aside from the regular 3-position key for alternating between both pickups.

== Instruments ==
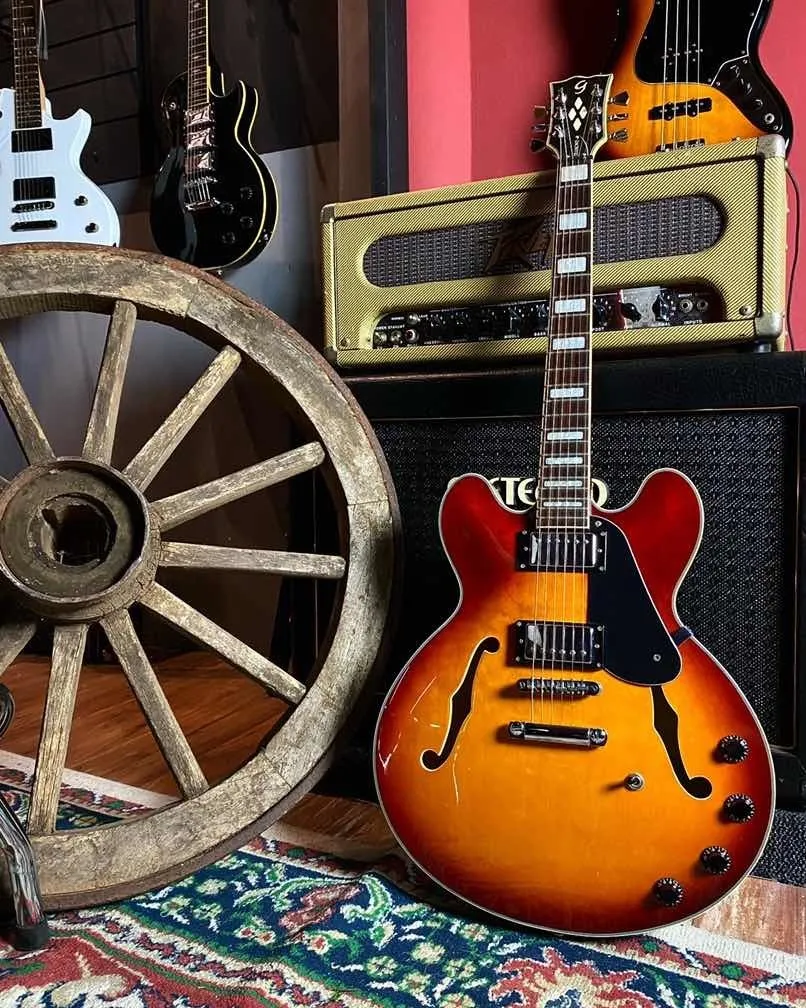
A Giannini Diamond GSH 350.

=== Current ===
==== Electric Guitars ====
- G-100
- G-101
- G-102

==== Bass ====
- GB-100
- GB-200 A
- GB-205 A

==== Bowed ====
- GB-100
- GB-200 A
- GB-205 A

==== Recorders ====
- Recorder Barroque (GFD 24B, GFD 314B)
- Recorder German (GFD 313G, GFD 23G)

==== Ethnical ====
- Cavaquinho
- Viola caipira
- Mandolin

=== Catalog ===
==== Electric Guitars ====
- SuperSonic (AEO3, GG03, GSS-ECL)
- Stratosonic (AE08, GG08)
- Telesonic (AE02)
- Craviola (GCRA-202 EL FM)
- Diamond (Mirage Guitar, AE06, Apollo, GSH 350)
- Gemini (AE04, GG04)
