= Café da Manhã (song) =

Single by Luísa Sonza and Ludmilla

from the album Doce 22
- Language: Portuguese
- Released: 9 February 2022
- Genre: Funk carioca; trap
- Length: 3:02
- Label: Universal Music Brazil
- Songwriters: Luísa Sonza; Ludmilla Oliveira; Caio Paiva; Douglas Moda; Hodari; Luccas Carlos; Victor Ferreira
- Producers: We4 Music; Paiva Prod. / White Monkey Recordings

Luísa Sonza singles chronology
"Anaconda" (2021)	"Café da Manhã" (2022)	"Cachorrinhas" (2022)

Ludmilla singles chronology
"Maldivas" (2022)	"Café da Manhã" (2023)

Music video
- "Café da Manhã" on YouTube

"Café da Manhã" (stylized as CAFÉ DA MANHÃ ;P, Portuguese: [kaˈfɛ dɐ mɐˈɲɐ̃]; "breakfast", literally, "morning coffee") is a song by Brazilian singers Luísa Sonza and Ludmilla, recorded for Sonza's second studio album, Doce 22 (2021). It was released as the fifth and final single from the album on 9 February 2022 through Universal Music Brazil.

== Live performance ==
Luísa and Ludmilla performed the song for the first time on the program Caldeirão com Mion, and on MTV MIAW 2022, along with a medley with "Cachorrinhas" and "Socadona".

== Charts ==
=== Weekly charts ===
Weekly chart performance for "Café da Manhã"
Chart (2022)	Peak position
Portugal (AFP)	49

=== Year-end charts ===
Year-end chart performance for "Café da Manhã"
Chart (2022)	Position
Brazil (Pro-Música Brasil)	65

== Certifications ==
Certifications for "Café da Manhã"
Region	Certification	Certified units/sales
Brazil (Pro-Música Brasil)	2× Diamond	600,000^{‡}
^{‡} Sales+streaming figures based on certification alone.

== Release history ==
Release history for "Café da Manhã"
Region	Date	Format(s)	Label	Ref.
Various	9 February 2022	Digital download; streaming	Universal Brazil	
