= Cachorrinhas =

Single by Luísa Sonza
- Language: Portuguese
- Released: 18 July 2022
- Genre: Pop-trap
- Length: 2:14
- Label: Sony Music Brazil
- Songwriters: Luísa Sonza; Diggo Martins; Elana Dara; Hodari; Laudz; Zegon
- Producer: Tropkillaz

Luísa Sonza singles chronology
"Medley Lud Session" (2022)	"Cachorrinhas" (2022)	"Coração Cigano" (2022)

Music video
- "Cachorrinhas" on YouTube

"Cachorrinhas" (Portuguese: [kaˈʃɔʁiɲas]; transl. "Puppies") is a song recorded by Brazilian singer-songwriter Luísa Sonza. It was released as a single on 18 July 2022 through Sony Music Brazil, being its first release by the label.

== Background ==
In January 2022, singer-songwriter Luísa Sonza decided not to renew with the Universal Music Brasil label, to which they signed a contract in 2017. Through the label, the albums Pandora (2019) and Doce 22 (2021) were released. In May of the same year, the singer signed a US$20 million contract with the Brazilian division of Sony Music.

== Lyrics and composition ==
"Cachorrinhas" is the result of a collaborative work between Sonza, Diggo Martins, Elana Dara, Hodari, Laudz and Zegon, and the production was in charge of the duo Tropkillaz. Musically, it is a fast-paced work that incorporates the pop-trap musical genre. Sonza brings her pets to the forefront of the song, Gisele Pinschers, Britney Spinschers Sonza, Duda Beainscher Sonza, besides the cat Rita Lee Sonza, that are personified in the singer's friends.

== Music video ==
The music video was released on July 18, the singer's 24th birthday, and was directed by Fernando Nogari and recorded on film and inspired by the underground short films of the 70's, which the artist described as "one of the most expensive of his career". The audiovisual record features the participation of Tracie (Tasha's duo), Mariana Lacorte, Alexza Paraiso and Belle Belinha; besides Sonza's dogs and cat.

== Promotion ==
During the Expocrato Festival, which takes place in the city of Crato, Ceará, Sonza released an excerpt from "Cachorrinhas" and stated through Twitter that "it will end a period and a musical language that he has used since the beginning of his career", the song was released on July 18 and marks their first release through Sony Music.

For its promotion, the artist carried out an action in favor of canine rights: where 1 kg of feed was donated to the Luisa Mell Institute for every 100 pre-saves on digital platforms.

== Charts ==
Weekly chart performance for "Cachorrinhas"
Chart (2022)	Peak position
Brazil (Billboard)	2
Global 200 (Billboard)	141
Portugal (AFP)	10

=== Monthly charts ===
Monthly chart performance for "Cachorrinhas"
Chart (2022)	Peak position
Brazil (Pro-Música Brasil)	3

=== Year-end charts ===
Year-end chart performance for "Cachorrinhas"
Chart (2022)	Position
Brazil (Pro-Música Brasil)	90

== Certifications ==
Certifications for "Cachorrinhas"
Region	Certification	Certified units/sales
Portugal (AFP)	Gold	5,000^{‡}
^{‡} Sales+streaming figures based on certification alone.

== Release history ==
Release dates and formats for "Cachorrinhas"
Region	Date	Format	Label	Ref.
Various	18 November 2021	digital download; streaming	Sony Music Brazil	
