= Baco Exu do Blues =

Brazilian rapper and composer (born 1996)

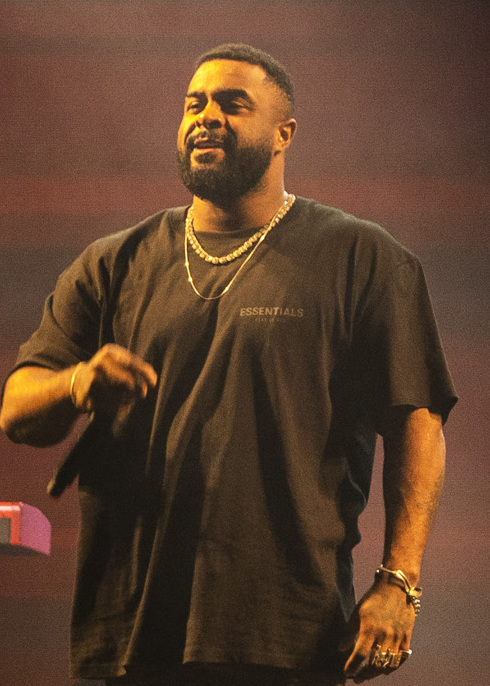
- Baco Exu do Blues in July 2022

Background information
- Born: Diogo Álvaro Ferreira Moncorvo; January 11, 1996 (age 30); Salvador, Bahia, Brazil
- Genres: MPB; samba-rap; hip hop; rap; blues
- Occupations: Singer; composer; rapper
- Instrument: Vocals
- Years active: 2015–present

Diogo Álvaro Ferreira Moncorvo, known professionally as Baco Exu do Blues (born 11 January 1996), is a Brazilian rapper, singer, and composer. He rose to prominence in the Brazilian rap scene with his 2017 album Esú. He was nominated for a Latin Grammy Award in 2022 for best Portuguese language Rock or Alternative album. The main characteristics of his work include strong metaphors with raw lyricism and poetics, with topics ranging from love and sex to power, religion, and society.

== Career ==
Baco Exu do Blues began to gain popularity with his 2016 track Sulicídio, which he composed in 2016 with Diomedes Chinaski. The track features both criticizing the current state of the Brazilian rap scene for being concentrated almost solely in the Southeast region of Brazil, specifically in the states of Rio de Janeiro and São Paulo, reclaiming more visibility to the musical production in Baco's home region of the Northeast and in the North. In 2017, Baco won the award for New Artist by the Multishow Brazilian Music Awards. In the same ceremony, he was also awarded Song of the Year by the juries for his song "Te Amo Disgraça" from the album Esú.

His 2018 album Bluesman was also ranked among the 50 best Brazilian albums of 2018 by Rolling Stone Brasil.

=== Esú ===
In September 2017, Baco released his first solo album, Esú, to critical acclaim by the media and critics alike. The album constructs a point between faith, death, love, literature, photography, and cinema. His album takes inspiration from Brazilian authors such as Jorge Amado, Machado de Assis, and Mário de Andrade, famed Bahian artist Mário Cravo Júnior, and movies such as the 2011 Pedro Almodóvar film The Skin I Live In, of which a song from the album is named after.

With the album, Baco was nominated for the 2017 Prêmio APCA in the categories of New Artist, Song of the Year, and Track of the Year. "Te Amo Disgraça" was awarded with the title of Best Brazilian Rap Song of the year by Genius through the Genius Brazil Music Awards 2017. It was ranked as the 5th best album of the year by Rolling Stone Brasil.

== Discography ==
=== Studio albums ===
- Esú (2017)
- Bluesman (2018)
- Não Tem Bacanal na Quarentena (2020)
- QVVJFA• (Quantas Vezes Você Já Foi Amado?) (2022)

=== EPs ===
- Oldmonkey (2015)
- Direto do Hospício (2017)

== Awards ==
Year	Award	Category	Nomination	Result	Ref.
2017	Prêmio APCA	New Artist	Baco Exu do Blues	Nominated	
2017	Prêmio APCA	Song of the Year	"Te Amo Disgraça"	Nominated	
2017	Prêmio APCA	Record of the Year	"Esú"	Nominated	
2018	Multishow Brazilian Music Award	New Artist – Superjury	Baco Exu do Blues	Won	
2018	Multishow Brazilian Music Award	Song of the Year – Superjury	"Te Amo Disgraça"	Won	
2019	Multishow Brazilian Music Award	Clip of the Year	"Bluesman"	Won	
2019	Cannes Lions International Festival of Creativity	Entertainment for Music	"Bluesman"	Won	
2019	MTV MIAW Awards Brazil	Musical Artist	Baco Exu do Blues	Nominated	
2019	MTV MIAW Awards Brazil	Beat BR	Baco Exu do Blues	Nominated	
2022	MTV MIAW Awards Brazil	Album of the Year	QVVJFA• – Baco Exu do Blues	Nominated	
2022	MTV MIAW Awards Brazil	Big Fucking Clip award	"Gotham é Aqui" – Baco Exu do Blues	Nominated	
2022	23rd Annual Latin Grammy Awards	Best Portuguese Language Rock or Alternative Album	QVVJFA•	Nominated	
