= Campo de Morango =

Single by Luísa Sonza

from the album Escândalo Íntimo
- Language: Portuguese
- Released: 15 August 2023
- Genre: Pop-trap
- Length: 1:16
- Label: Sony Music Brazil
- Songwriters: Luísa Sonza; Carolzinha; Douglas Moda; Jahnei Clarke; Jenni Mosello; Lucas Vaz; Mason Sacks; Roy Lenzo
- Producers: Lenzo; Moda; Sacks; Clarke

Luísa Sonza singles chronology
"Saudade" (2023)	"Campo de Morango" (2023)	"Principalmente Me Sinto Arrasada" (2023)

Music video
- "Campo de Morango" on YouTube

"Campo de Morango" (Portuguese: [ˈkɐ̃pu dʒi moˈɾɐ̃ɡu], "Strawberry Field") is a song recorded by Brazilian singer-songwriter Luísa Sonza, present in her third studio album Escândalo Íntimo (2023). The track was released as the first single promoting the album on August 15, 2023 through Sony Music Brazil, along with its music video.

== Lyrics ==
Composed by the artist together with Carolzinha, Douglas Moda, Jahnei Clarke, Jenni Mosello, Lucas Vaz, Mason Sacks and Roy Lenzo, with production signed by Lenzo, Moda, Sacks and Clarke.

== Music video ==
The music video for "Campo de Morango" was released simultaneously with the song and caused controversy on social networks due to the singer appearing on a bed in the middle of an open field next to her dancers covered in strawberry juice, but alluding to blood. The images were considered "disturbing" by netizens, where some accused the singer of making allusions to sexual abuse, abortion and satanism in the video, while others criticized the sexual content of the lyrics that explicitly address female sexuality.

== Charts ==
Weekly chart performance for "Campo de Morango"
Chart (2023)	Peak position
Brazil (Brasil Hot 100)	14
Portugal (AFP)	62

== Release history ==
Release dates and formats for "Campo de Morango"
Region	Date	Format	Label	Ref.
Various	15 August 2023	digital download; streaming	Sony Music Brazil	
