= Duda Beat =

Brazilian singer and songwriter

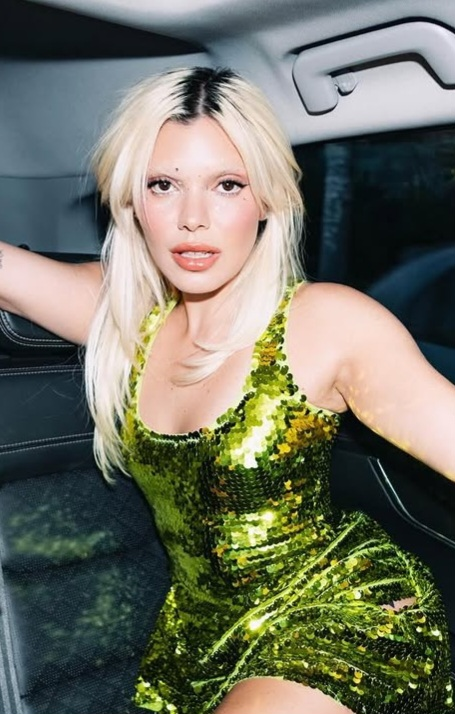
- Duda Beat in 2026
- Born: Eduarda Bittencourt Simões; October 8, 1987 (age 38); Recife, Pernambuco, Brazil
- Occupations: Singer, songwriter
- Years active: 2018–present
- Musical career
- Genres: Pop; MPB; Electropop; Electronic dance music

Eduarda Bittencourt Simões (Portuguese: [siˈmõj̃ʃ]; born October 8, 1987), better known as Duda Beat, is a Brazilian singer and songwriter. She won the ACPA Award for Breakthrough Artist in 2018, and her debut album Sinto Muito was listed among Rolling Stone Brasil's best 50 Brazilian records of that year. Duda Beat was nominated for a 2021 Latin Grammy Award for Best Brazilian Contemporary Pop Album for her album in partnership with Nando Reis.

== Biography ==
Eduarda Bittencourt Simões was born on October 8, 1987, in Recife, the capital of the Brazilian state of Pernambuco. She is the daughter of Suyenne Bittencourt and Tárciso Simões. While she originally used the stage name "Duda Bitt", the artist later decided to adopt the name Duda Beat in homage to the countercultural manguebeat movement.

At age 18, she moved to Rio de Janeiro. In April 2018, she graduated with a degree in political science from the Federal University of the State of Rio de Janeiro, publishing an article on evangelical Christianity and Brazilian politics. In the same month, she began her professional music career, releasing her debut album Sinto Muito.

Duda Beat is married to Tomás Tróia, a producer of her two albums and member of her band.

Her album Tara & Tal was included in the list of 50 best albums of 2024 by the São Paulo Art Critics Association.

== Discography ==
=== Studio albums ===
Studio albums
Title	Studio album details
Sinto Muito	Released: April 27, 2018; Label: Independent; Formats: LP, digital download
Te Amo Lá Fora	Released: April 27, 2021; Label: Independent; Formats: LP, digital download
Tara & Tal	Released: April 11, 2024; Label: Universal Music Group; Formats: digital download

=== Extended plays ===
Title	Extended play details
Duda Beat & Nando Reis (with Nando Reis)	Released: January 22, 2021; Label: Relicário; Formats: Digital download

=== Singles ===
==== As lead artist ====
Title	Year	Certifications	Album
"Bixinho"	2018	PMB: Platinum	Sinto Muito
"Derretendo"	2018		Sinto Muito
"Bolo de Rolo"	2018		Sinto Muito
"Chega" (feat. Jaloo and Mateus Carrilho)	2019		Non-album single
"Deixa Eu Te Amar"	2019		Non-album single
"Vem Quente Que Eu Estou Fervendo"	2020		Non-album single
"Vem pro Meu Condo" (with Afro B and Tropkillaz)	2020		Non-album single
"Não Passa Vontade" (with Anavitória)	2020		Non-album single
"Bixinho (Lux & Tróia Remix)"	2020	PMB: Gold	Non-album single
"Meu Pisêro"	2021	PMB: Gold	Te Amo Lá Fora
"Nem Um Pouquinho" (feat. Trevo)	2021	PMB: Gold	Te Amo Lá Fora

==== As featured artist ====
Title	Year	Certifications	Album
"Só Eu e Você na Pista" (Illy feat. Duda Beat)	2019		Non-album single
"Meu Jeito de Amar" (Mulú feat. Duda Beat and Lux & Tróia)	2019		Non-album single
"Seu Pensamento" (Adriana Calcanhotto feat. Duda Beat)	2019		Nada Ficou no Lugar
"Corpo em Brasa" (Romero Ferro feat. Duda Beat)	2019		FERRO
"A Graça" (Izenzêê feat. Duda Beat)	2019		Vida e Nada Mais
"Meu Primeiro Amor" (Lucas Santtana feat. Duda Beat)	2019		O Céu é Velho Há Muito Tempo
"Tangerina" (Tiago Iorc feat. Duda Beat)	2019		Acústico MTV
"Xanalá" (Gaby Amarantos feat. Duda Beat)	2019		Non-album single
"Sobrou Silêncio" (Rashid feat. Duda Beat)	2019	PMB: Platinum	Tão Real
