= Doce 22 =

Studio album by Luísa Sonza
- Released: 18 July 2021
- Recorded: 2020–2021
- Genre: Pop
- Length: 38:54
- Language: Portuguese
- Label: Universal
- Producer: Arthur Marques; DJ Thai; Douglas Moda; NAVE Beatz; Rafinha RSQ; Rennan da Penha; TIN

Luísa Sonza chronology
Pandora (2019)	Doce 22 (2021)	Escândalo Íntimo (2023)

Singles from Doce 22
- 1. "Modo Turbo" Released: 21 December 2020; 2. "VIP" / "Melhor Sozinha" Released: 18 July 2021; 3. "Fugitivos" Released: 2 November 2021; 4. "Anaconda" Released: 8 December 2021; 5. "Café da Manhã" Released: 8 February 2022

Doce 22 (Portuguese: [ˈdosi ˈvĩtʃi i ˈdojs]; Sweet 22) is the second studio album by Brazilian singer-songwriter Luísa Sonza, released on 18 July 2021, through Universal Music. The album features the participation of 6lack, Pabllo Vittar, Anitta, Ludmilla, Mariah Angeliq, Jão and Lulu Santos.

Doce 22 explores Luísa's personal duality, being divided into two sides: A and B. While the first side focuses on a more pop and funk sound, with influences from trap, R&B and singers like Britney Spears and Christina Aguilera, the B side shows more intimate and vulnerable lyrics in a softer sound.

The album was a commercial success, having the biggest weekly debut in the history of Spotify Brazil being followed by the singles "Modo Turbo", "VIP", "Melhor Sozinha", "Fugitivos", "Anaconda" and "Café da Manhã". The song "Penhasco" also gained organic notoriety, reaching high peaks on streaming platforms and radio plays even though it was just a standard track on the album. Doce 22 was nominated for the 23rd edition of the Latin Grammy Awards in the category Best Portuguese Language Contemporary Pop Album.

== Background and development ==
"[I want] this album to comfort you, entertain you, make you cry, make you feel sexy, make you feel anger, courage, pleasure, pain, strength. A lot of strength, preferably. May this album make you feel".

— Sonza about the album.

In June 2019, Luísa Sonza released her debut album, Pandora. In March 2020, after her single "Braba" reached the top 10 on Spotify, Sonza told POPline that the album "is the beginning of a new era" and which is "very different from the Pandora album". In February 2021, she revealed that she had started recording her second album. In April 2021, in an interview with Harper's Bazaar Brazil, she stated that the album "is the coolest thing she has ever done in her life". Later, in May 2021, talking to her fans on Instagram, she said that she "delivered everything" on the record and that it was inspired by pop divas of the 2000s. She later confirmed that the album was already done.

Initially, according to the artist herself, the album would bring the already released singles "Braba" and "Toma", in addition to new sounds. However, after the postponement of the album scheduled to be released in June – due to the massive attack received by Luísa on her social networks due to her love life – the album's track alignment was changed and the singles were not included.19 Sonza compared the new album to Christina Aguilera's Stripped era. The singer says that one of her strongest references, and which also influenced the aesthetic part of the work, is the pop movement of the 2000s – led by names like Britney Spears and Christina Aguilera. The name of the album is also inspired by the 2000s, specifically the reality show My Super Sweet 16 on MTV, which for over 10 years transformed the normal lives of teenagers into a great spectacle in the eyes of the public, similarly to what happened with Sonza, who "at the height of her 22 years, the artist saw her life and personal problems being exaggerated on the internet".

== Release and promotion ==
The album was expected to be released at the end of June 2021, but ended up being postponed due to the artist's removal from social networks after suffering new attacks due to her personal life. Sonza returned to social networks on 12 July 2021, when announced the release of Doce 22. The release of the album was set for 18 July 2021, a Sunday and her birthday, since the album title alludes to the artist's age during the recording of the material and that this would be the deadline for its release ― ending at 11:55 pm. Of the 14 total tracks, three were not immediately available for strategic reasons. The tracks leaked the following month, on August 13.

=== Singles ===
"Modo Turbo", with Pabllo Vittar and Anitta's participation, was released on 21 December 2020. The song was confirmed as the first single before the album's release. Later, Sonza confirmed that the tracks "VIP" (featuring by American rapper 6lack) and "Melhor Sozinha" would be released as singles along with the release of the album, on 18 July 2021, accompanied by a performance on the Fantástico program and their respective video clips.

The track "Também Não Sei de Nada", featuring Lulu Santos, was released as a single on the same occasion. The three songs that were locked in the release of the album were released as they were worked on as official promotional singles. "Fugitivos", featuring Jão, was released as the third single on 2 November 2021. The music video was released on the same day, at 9 pm.

"Anaconda" was released as the fourth single from Doce 22 on 9 December 2021, and features American singer Mariah Angeliq. A performance at the Prêmio Multishow 2021 took place on the same day, while the video was released the following day.32 To promote the track before its release, several posters with a snake print were placed by people dressed in black on Paulista Avenue.

On 8 February 2022, "Café da Manhã", featuring Ludmilla, was released as the fifth and final single from the album.

== Track listing ==
Doce 22 track listing
No.	Title	Lyrics	Producer(s)	Length
1.	"Interesseira"	L. Sonza; A. Marques; D. Timbó; D. Moda; L. Carlos; R. RSQ; Tin	We4 Music; RSQ; Tin	2:10
2.	"VIP" (with 6lack)	Sonza; R. Valentine; Marques; C. Biazin; DJ Thai; J. Mosello; King	DJ Thai; Marques	2:56
3.	"Modo Turbo" (with Pabllo Vittar and Anitta)	Marques; Timbó; Sonza; RSQ	RSQ; R. da Penha	2:30
4.	"Café da Manhã" (with Ludmilla)	Sonza; C. Paiva; Moda; Hodari; Carlos; L. Oliveira; V. Ferreira	Moda; We4 Music; Paiva Produções	3:02
5.	"2000"	Biazin; Day; Timbó; Sonza; Nave	We4 Music	2:39
6.	"Anaconda" (with Mariah Angeliq)	Sonza; Aisha; Biazin; Day; Mosello; King; L. Vaz; M. Angeliq; Play-N-Skillz; R. Autentico; R. Frei	Vaz	3:03
7.	"Mulher do Ano"	Sonza; Moda; Hodari; Carlos; Ferreira	We4 Music	2:35
8.	"Interlude"	Sonza; Moda; I. Freitas	We4 Music	1:10
9.	"Melhor Sozinha"	Sonza; Biazin; Moda; Nave; Ferreira	We4 Music	3:46
10.	"Fugitivos" (with Jão)	Sonza; A. Jordão; Moda; Jão	We4 Music	3:26
11.	"Penhasco"	Jordão; Biazin; Day; Moda; Sonza	We4 Music	3:06
12.	"Caos / Flor"	Sonza; Day; Moda	We4 Music	2:31
13.	"O Conto dos Dois Mundos (Hipocrisia)"	Sonza; Jordão; Moda; Ferreira	We4 Music	3:04
14.	"Também Não Sei de Nada" (with Lulu Santos)	Sonza; Nave; Ferreira	We4 Music	2:50
Total length:				38:54

Notes

- "Interesseira" is stylised as "INTERE$$EIRA"
- "VIP" is stylised as "VIP *-*"
- "Café da Manhã" is stylised as "CAFÉ DA MANHÃ ;P"
- "2000" is stylised as "2000 s2"
- "Anaconda" is stylised as "ANACONDA *o* ~~~"
- "Mulher do Ano" is stylised as "MULHER DO ANO XD"
- "Interlude" is stylised as "INTERlude :("
- "Melhor Sozinha" is stylised as "melhor sozinha :-)-:"
- "Fugitivos" is stylised as "fugitivos :)"
- "Penhasco" is stylised as "penhasco."
- "Caos / Flor" is stylised as "caos / flor ***"
- "Também Não Sei de Nada" is stylised as "também não sei de nada :D"

== Certifications ==
Certifications for Doce 22
Region	Certification	Certified units/sales
Brazil (Pro-Música Brasil)	2× Diamond	600,000^{‡}
^{‡} Sales+streaming figures based on certification alone.

== Release history ==
Release dates and formats for Doce 22
Region	Date	Format	Label	Ref.
Various	18 July 2021	Digital download; streaming	Universal	
