= Carol Biazin =

Brazilian singer-songwriter (born 1997)

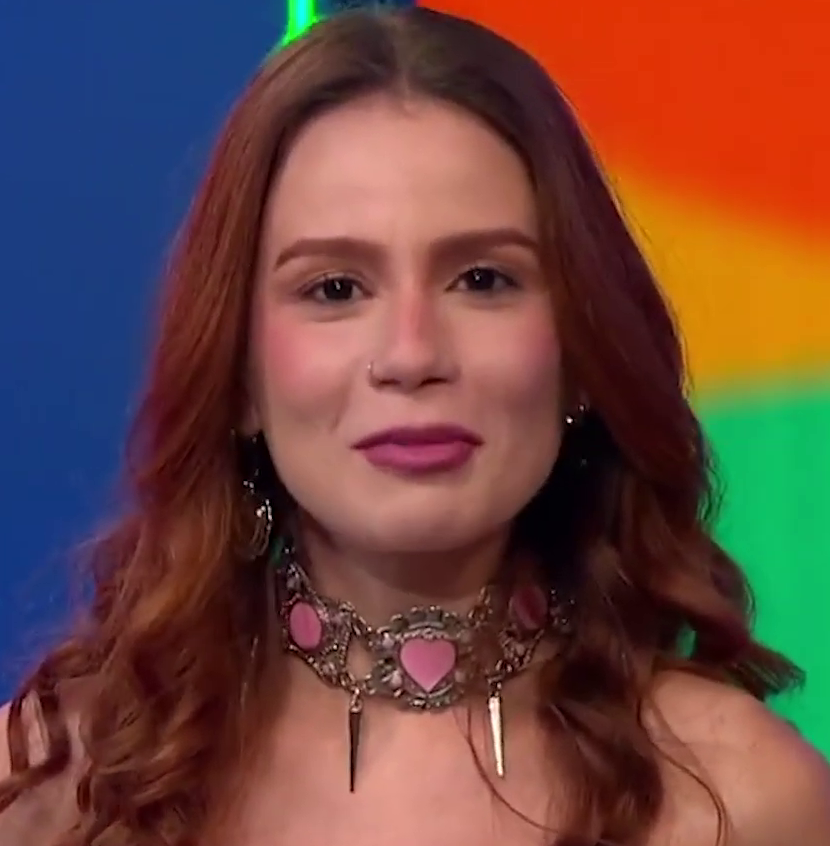
- Biazin in 2023

Background information
- Born: Caroline dos Reis Biazin; 22 April 1997 (age 29); Campo Mourão, Paraná, Brazil
- Occupation: Singer
- Years active: 2016–present
- Musical career
- Genres: Pop; MPB; R&B

Caroline dos Reis Biazin (born 22 April 1997) is a Brazilian singer-songwriter and actress.

== Early life ==
Born in Campo Mourão, Biazin grew up between Campo Mourão, São João do Ivaí and Curitiba. The daughter of two shopkeepers, she has two older siblings. At young age she got guitar lessons, and her first guitar was a Giannini. She studied Popular Music at the University of the State of Paraná.

== Career ==
After moving to São Paulo to pursue a singing career, in 2016 Biazin competed in the first edition of X-Factor, and in 2017 she was runner-up in The Voice Brasil.

In 2019, Biazin made her record debut with the EP S, which got her the Prêmio Jovem Brasileiro as Artist of the Year. In 2021, she released her first album Beijo de Judas. In 2022, she received the MTV Miaw Award in the "Orgulho do Vale" (Pride of the Valley) category. In 2023, she released her second album Reversa. The same year, she was nominated for Multishow Brazilian Music Award as revelation of the year.

Biazin is also active as a songwriter for other artists, including Luísa Sonza, Anitta, Rouge, Claudia Leitte, Juliette and Vitão.

== Discography ==
Albums

- S (EP, 2019)
- Sem filtro (EP, 2020)
- Beijo de Judas (2021)
- Reversa (2023)
- No Escuro, (2024)
- No Escuro, Quem É Você? (2025)

== Awards and nominations ==
Year	Award	Category	Nominee	Result
2019	Prêmio Jovem Brasileiro	Breakthrough of the Year	Carol Biazin	Won
2019	Influency Me	Digital Star	Carol Biazin	Nominated
2019	Prêmio POP Mais	New Artist	Carol Biazin	Won
2019	Prêmio POP Mais	Breakthrough Artist	Carol Biazin	Won
2022	MTV Miaw	Pride of the Valley	Carol Biazin	Won
2023	Prêmio Multishow	Breakthrough Artist	Carol Biazin	Nominated
2023	Prêmio Biscoito	Hitmaker of the Valley	Carol Biazin	Nominated
2023	Prêmio Biscoito	Artist of the Valley	Carol Biazin	Nominated
2023	Prêmio Biscoito	Album of the Valley	Reversa	Nominated
2025	Latin Grammy Awards	Best Contemporary Pop Album in Portuguese	No Escuro, Quem É Você?	Nominated
