= James Armour (master mason) =

Scottish master mason (1731-1798)

- Born: 15 January 1731
- Died: 20 September 1798 (aged 68); Mauchline, Scotland
- Occupation: Master mason
- Spouse: Mary Smith
- Children: 11, including Jean and Adam

James Armour (15 January 1731 (Note: Several data sources have his birth date as 10th/24th January 1731. The Scotland's People database has this record but showing his baptism on 24 January 1731. His birth on the original Old Parish Record is shown as 15 January 1731 to John Armour and Margrat(sic) Picken in Kilmarnock. James named his first son John which would normally be after James's father i.e. John. The chances of there being two James's born on exactly the same date exactly one year apart appear very remote and the naming of the first child seems to validate the conclusion that James Armour was born in 1731 and not 1730.) – 20 September 1798) was a master mason and father of Jean Armour, and therefore the father-in-law of the poet Robert Burns.

== Life and background ==
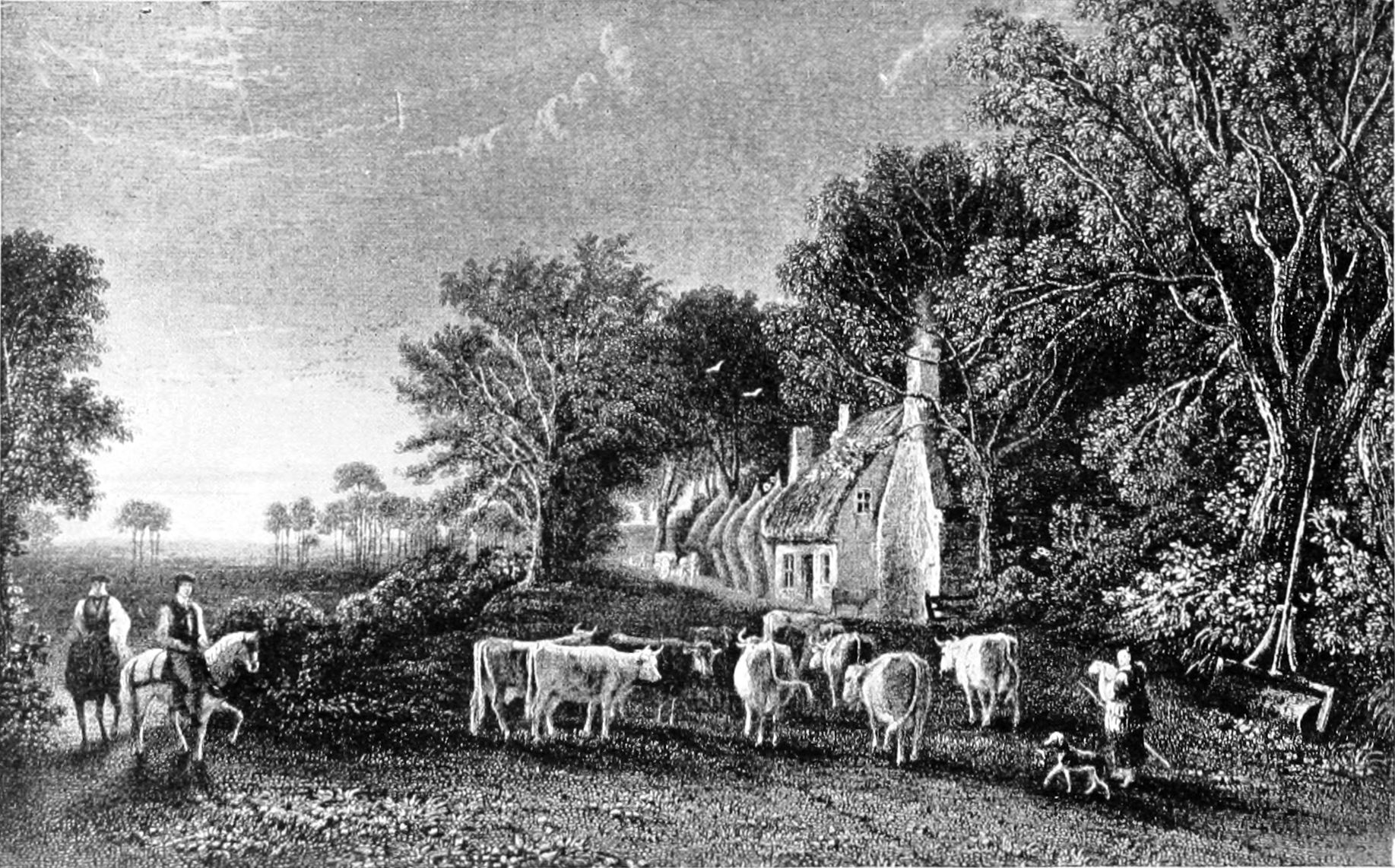
Mossgiel Farm. Home to Robert & Gilbert Burns.

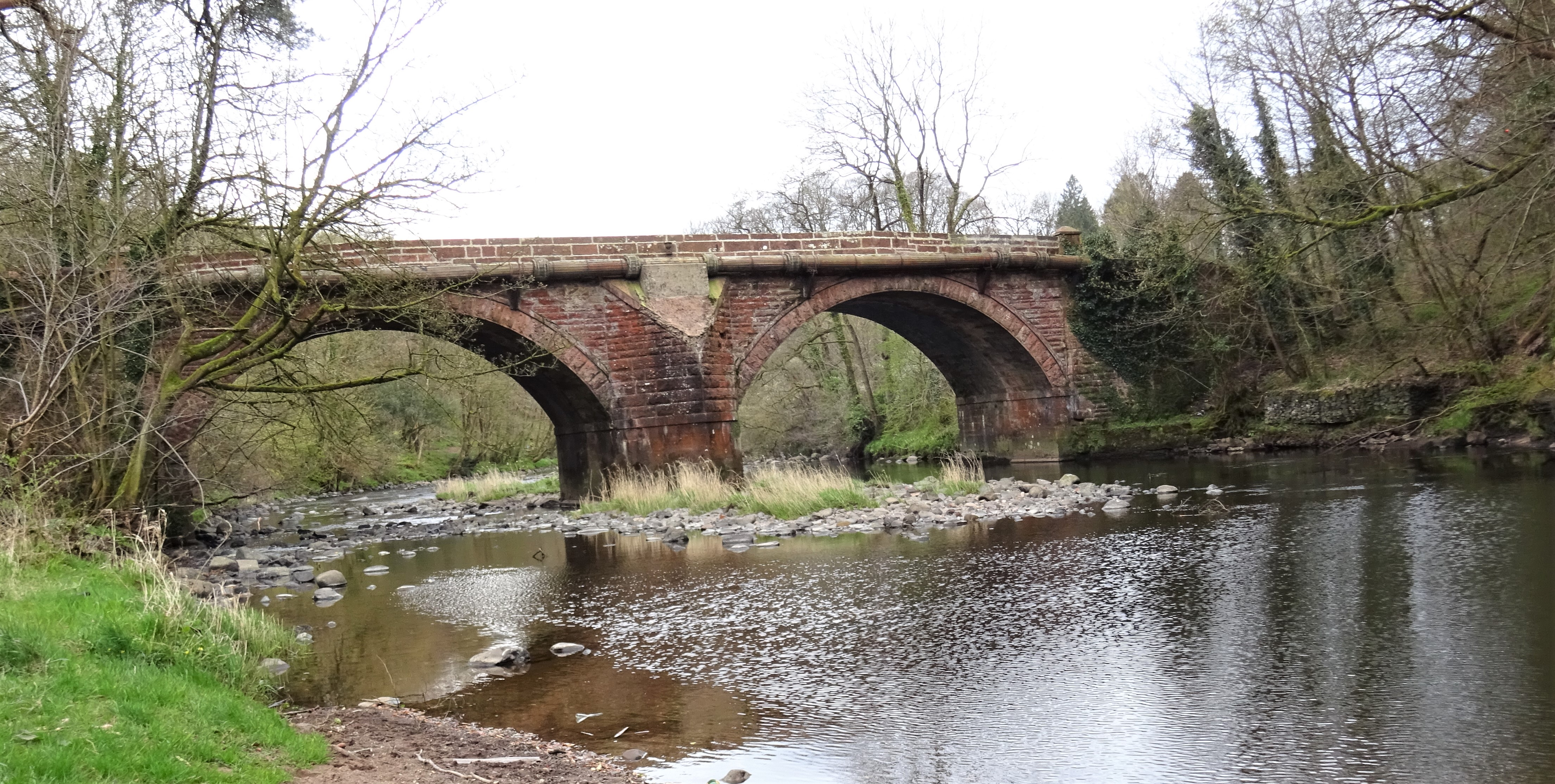
Howford Bridge on which James Armour worked as a stone mason.

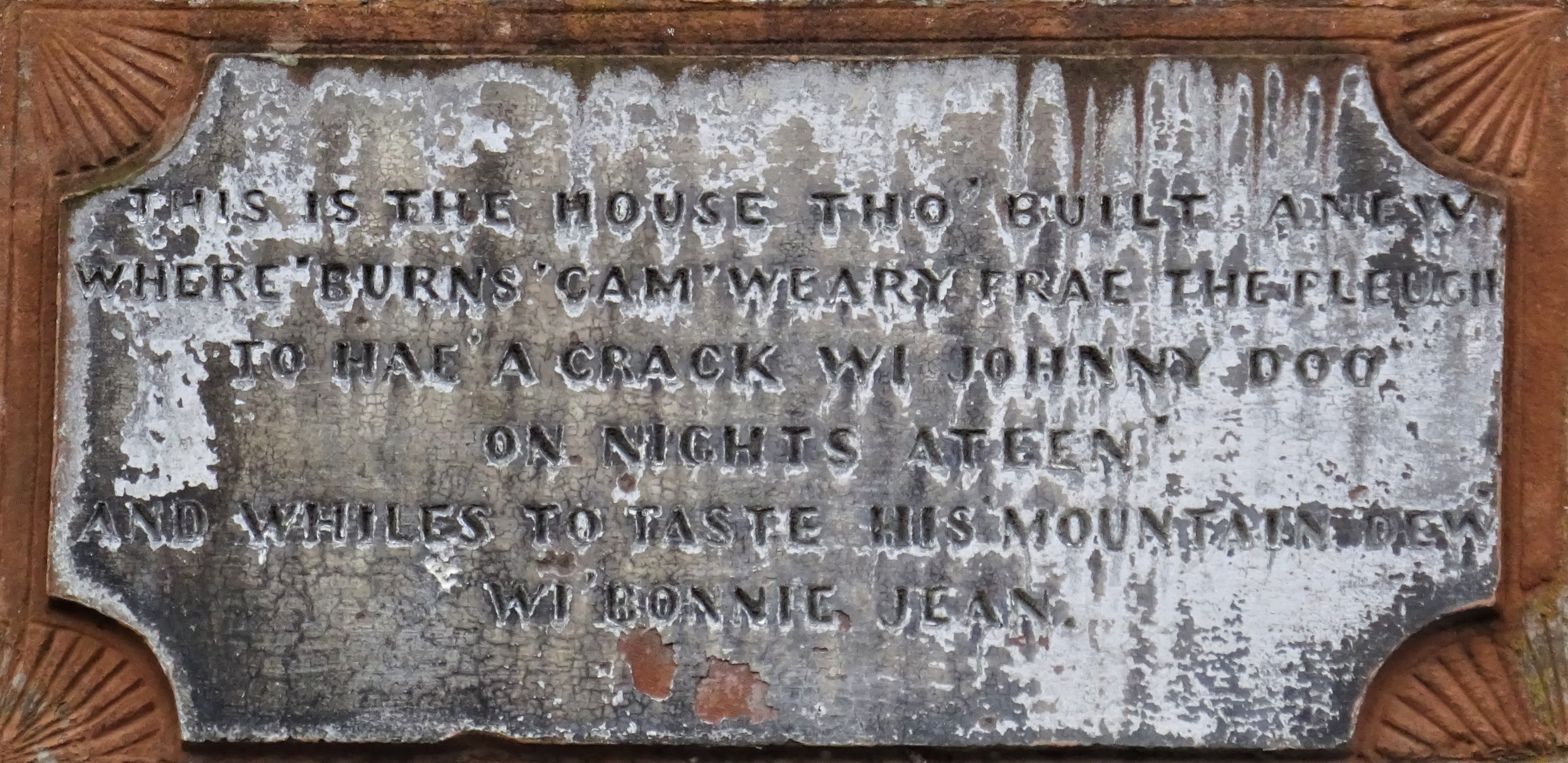
Plaque on the site of the old Whitefoord Inn

At Mauchline on 7 December 1761 he married Mary Smith, the daughter of stonemason Adam Smith. James died on 30 September 1798 and was buried in the family lair in Mauchline churchyard. His wife died in 1805 and was buried with her husband.

=== Family ===
James' eleven offspring with Mary, were, in birth order, John, Jean, James, Robert, Adam, Helen, Mary, Robert (2nd), Mary (2nd), Janet and Robert (3rd). Three siblings died in childhood. Dr John Armour was the eldest son who was born in Mauchline on 14 November 1762 and died in 1834. He had his practice in Kincardine-on-Forth where he died and was buried. He had two children, Janet and John, and married Janet Coventry on 10 March 1787. James and Mary's son James was born in Mauchline on 26 April 1767, married Betthaia Walker in 1794, Martha in 1818 and Janet in 1822. Their offspring were James and Betthaia. Adam Armour was named after Adam Smith, James Armour's father-in-law.

The Armours' single-storey house stood in Cowgate, separated from John Dove's Whitefoord Arms by a narrow lane. Jean's bedroom window looked on to a window of the inn, thereby allowing Burns to converse with her from the public house itself. The Whitefoord Inn was often frequented by Burns and was also the meeting place of the so-called Court of Equity and linked to a significant incident in the life of Jean's brother Adam regarding the mistreatment of Agnes Wilson.

=== Occupation and social standing ===
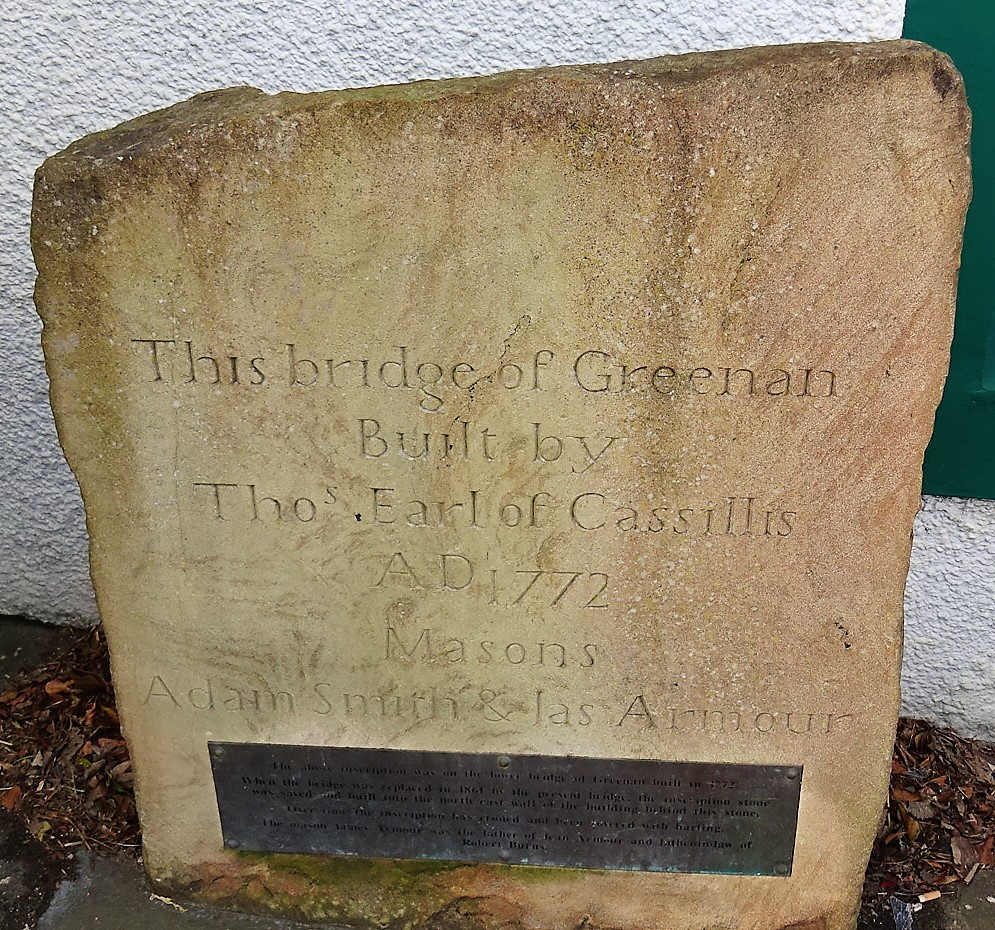
James Armour commemorated as a mason who worked on Old Greenan Bridge.

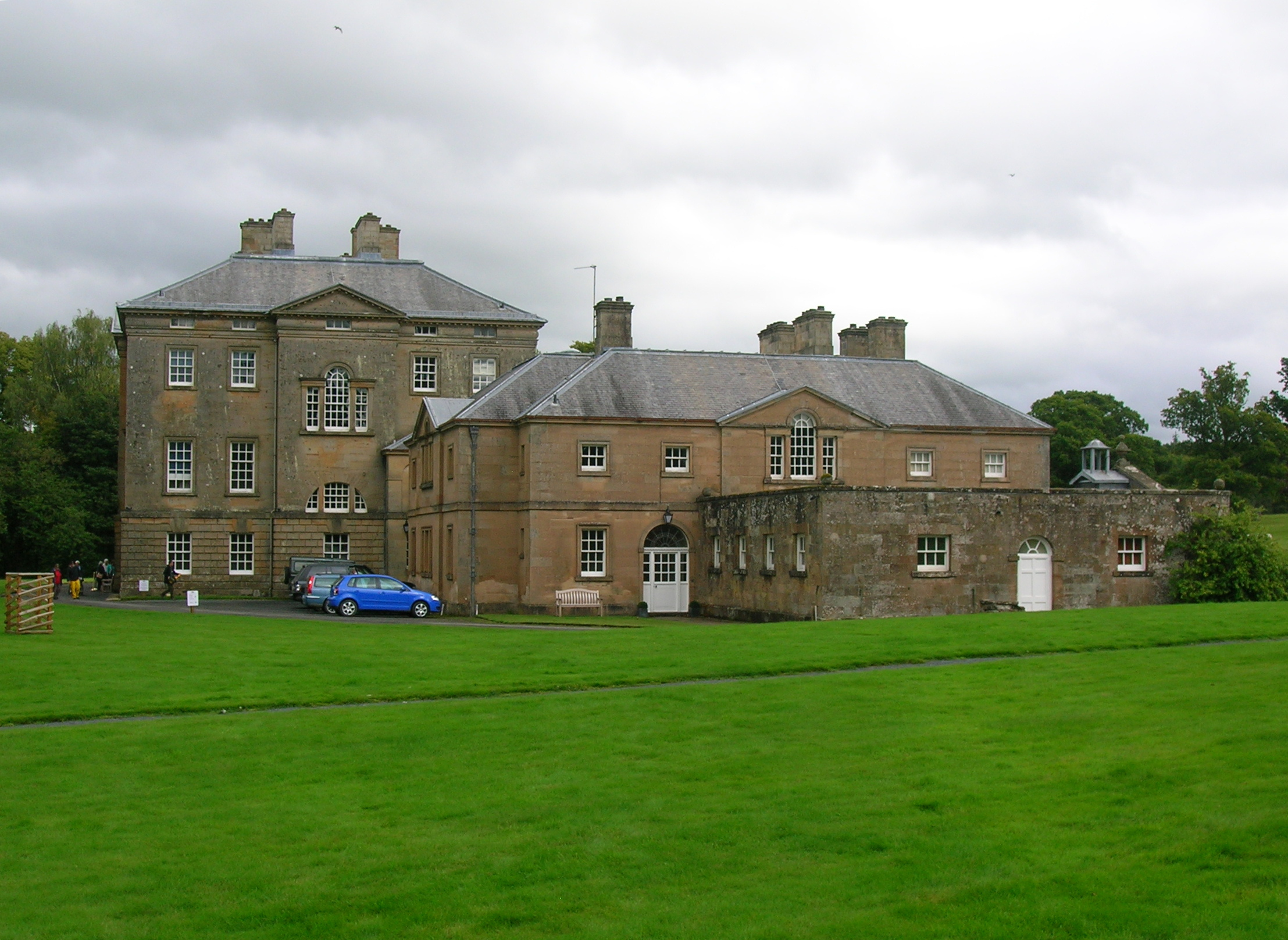
James Armour carried out contract work at Dumfries House.

James was a master mason and contractor rather than an architect, regardless of Burns' attempts to describe him as one. He is known to have carried out contract work at Dumfries House near Cumnock and tradition links him to the building of Howford Bridge on the River Ayr, Greenan Bridge on the River Doon; Skeldon House, Dalrymple; and several other bridges in Ayrshire. Both the Armours and his wife's family had been stone-masons for several generations. William Burnes, Robert Burns' cousin, was apprenticed to James Armour.

James was an adherent of the 'Auld Licht' style of religion and rented at 10/8 per year one of the most expensive pews in Mauchline church. James was rigid and austere, apparently living an exemplary life. Robert Burns-Begg, Burns' great-nephew, states that in contrast to her husband, Mary Armour was "Partaken somewhat of the gay and frivolous.".

William 'Willie' Patrick, a source of many anecdotes about Robert and his family, stated about James that "he was only a bit mason body, wha used to snuff a guid deal and gae afen tak a bit dram!" He went on to say regarding James' attitude to Robert Burns that "The thing was, he hated him, and would raither hae seen the Deil himsel comin to the hoose to coort his dochter than him! He cu'dna bear the sicht o'm, and that was the way he did it!".

== Association with Robert Burns ==
James had disapproved of Burns's courtship of Jean, being aware of his affair with Elizabeth Paton, his 'New Licht' leanings and his poor financial situation. When informed in March 1786 by his distraught wife that Jean was pregnant he fainted and upon recovering consciousness and being given a strong cordial drink he enquired who the father was, fainting again when he was told that it was Robert Burns. The couple persuaded Jean to travel to Paisley and lodge with their relative Andrew Purdie, husband of her aunt Elizabeth Smith. Robert Wilson lived in Paisley, a possible suitor who had shown a romantic interest in Jean previously, appears to have been only part of the reason for this action, for on 8 April Mary Armour had vehemently denied to James Lamie, a member of the Kirk Session, that Jean was pregnant.

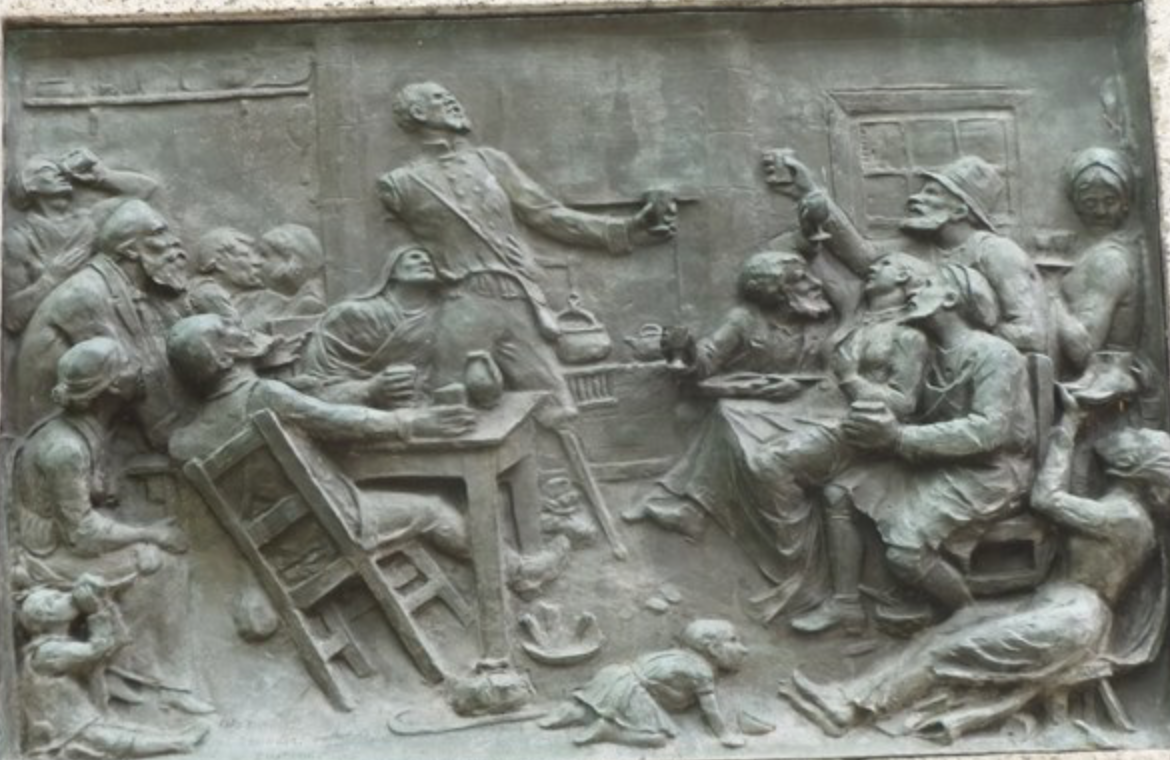
A scene from The Jolly Beggars at Poosie Nansie's Inn.

Robert Burns produced a paper, probably a record of their "Marriage by Declaration" possibly witnessed by James Smith. This document, no longer extant, was defaced under James Armour's direction, probably by the lawyer Robert Aitken, with the names of both Robert and Jean being cut out. This act did not in fact effect its legality. Robert wrote that James Armour's actions had "...cut my very veins", a feeling enhanced by Jean having handed over "the unlucky paper" and had agreed to go to Paisley.

James Armour in the meantime forced his daughter to sign a complaint and a warrant "in meditatione fugae" against Robert was issued to prevent his abandoning her. Burns fled to Old Rome Forest near Gatehead in South Ayrshire, where Jean Brown, Agnes Broun's half-sister and therefore an aunt of Burns, lived with her husband, James Allan.

Twins were born to Jean and Robert on 3 September 1786, named after their parents as was the kirk's protocol for children born out of wedlock. Robert, notified of the birth by Adam Armour, that Sunday went to the Armour's house with a gift of tea, sugar and a Guinea that proved most acceptable. Robert only returned from Edinburgh in the summer of 1787 to find that he was, thanks to his newly found fame as a published poet, actively welcomed into the family.

Jean however fell pregnant out of official wedlock once more, with the result that she felt forced to leave the Armour's home due to her father's anger. She was taken in by Willie Muir and his wife at Tarbolton Mill. It had previously been agreed that baby Jean would stay with her mother and baby Robert would join Bess at Mossgiel. The second set of twins did not live long and are buried, unnamed, in the Armour lair in Mauchline churchyard. Robert was in Edinburgh and did not arrive back until 23 February 1788; he then arranged accommodation for Jean.

Whilst at the Brow Well Robert Burns wrote two of his last letters to his father-in-law asking that Mary Armour, who was away visiting relatives in Fife, be sent to Dumfries to help care for Jean who was heavily pregnant. On 10 July 1796 his last letter was signed "Your most affectionate son. R. Burns."

Upon the death of Robert Burnes his nephew Robert arranged for his cousin William to become a mason or building worker, working with James Armour, Burns' father-in-law.

=== The Inveraray marble Punch Bowl ===
Of the many surviving Robert Burns artefacts few have such distinguished provenance as the punch bowl that was a nuptial gift in 1788 from James Armour to his daughter Jean and her new husband Robert Burns. As a stone-mason James had carved it himself (22cm x 14cm ) from dark green Inveraray marble and after residing at their various homes, Jean in 1801 presented it to her husband's great friend and Burns family benefactor Alexander Cunningham whilst she was on a visit to Edinburgh and staying with George Thomson. He had it mounted with a silver base and a rim, engraved upon which are the words “Ye whom social pleasure charms .. Come to my Bowl! Come to my arms, My FRIENDS, my BROTHERS!” taken from Burns’s “The Epistle to J. Lapraik.”

Alexander died in 1812 and it was then sold at auction in 1815 for the impressive price of 80 Guineas to a London publican who, falling upon hard times, sold it to Archibald Hastie Esq of London. A copy is held by the Robert Burns Birthplace Museum at Alloway, whilst the original is in the British Museum in London, presented to that institution by Archibald Hastie in 1858.

== See also ==
- Adam Armour
- Jean Armour
- Robert Burnes
- William Burnes
