= Robert Burnes =

Uncle of the poet Robert Burns (1719-1789)

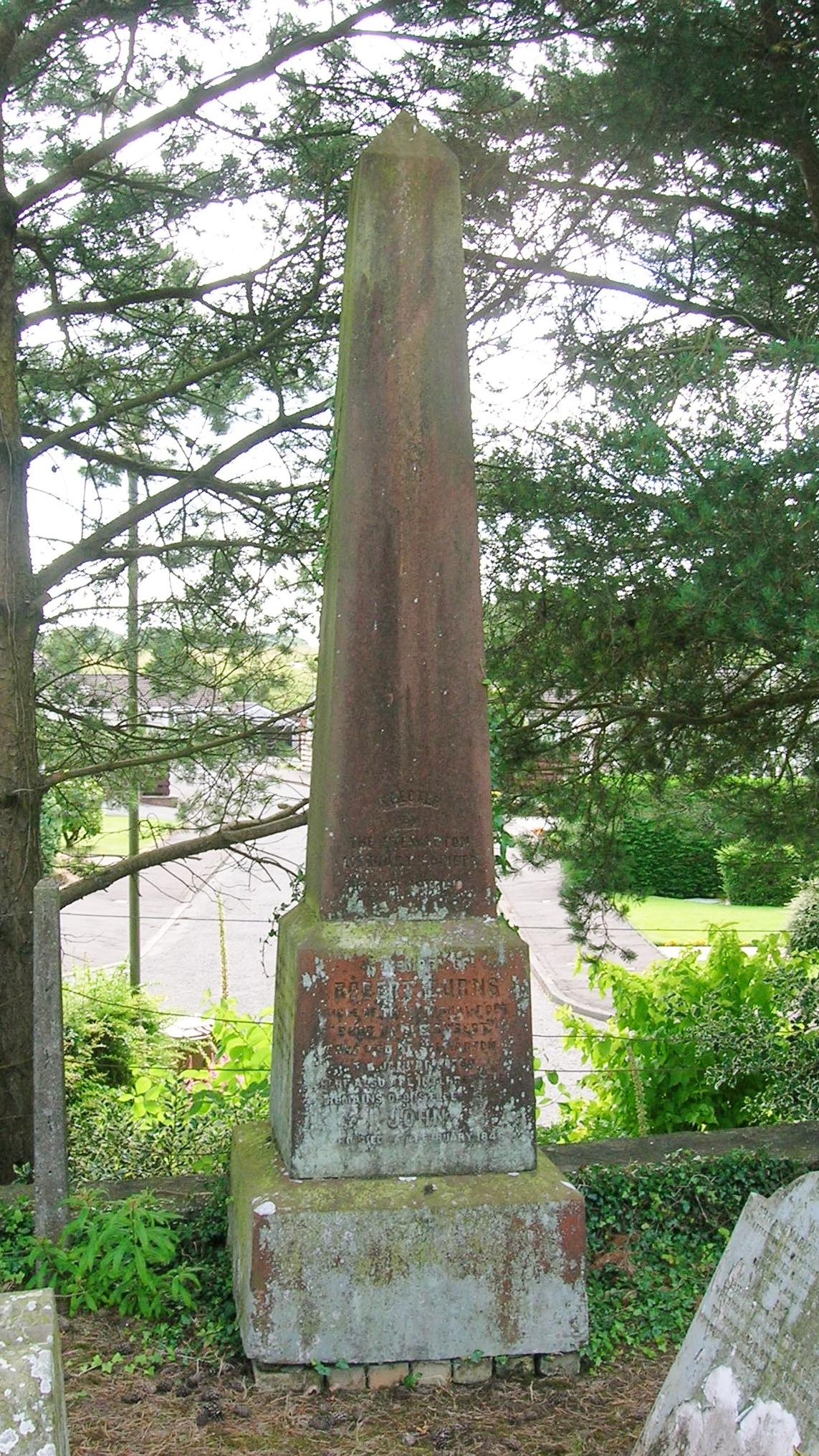
- Obelisk commemorating Robert and John Burnes at Stewarton
- Born: 1719; Clochnahill Farm, Kincardineshire, Scotland
- Died: 3 January 1789 (aged 69–70); Stewarton, Scotland
- Occupations: Quarryman, gardener, land steward and teacher
- Spouse: Agnes Craig
- Children: 4
- Relatives: William Burnes (brother)

Robert Burnes or Robert Burness (1719 – 3 January 1789) was a paternal uncle of the poet Robert Burns. He left the family farm of Clochnahill or Clokenhill in Kincardineshire with his younger brother William Burnes, and found work at the Lochridge or Lochrig limestone quarries and lime kilns that lay near Byrehill Farm near Stewarton. He was a teacher, a gardener later in life and a land steward on the nearby Robertland Estate, possibly through the influence of his nephew. Robert Burns referred to his him as Poor Uncle Robert upon his death in 1789.

== Life and background ==
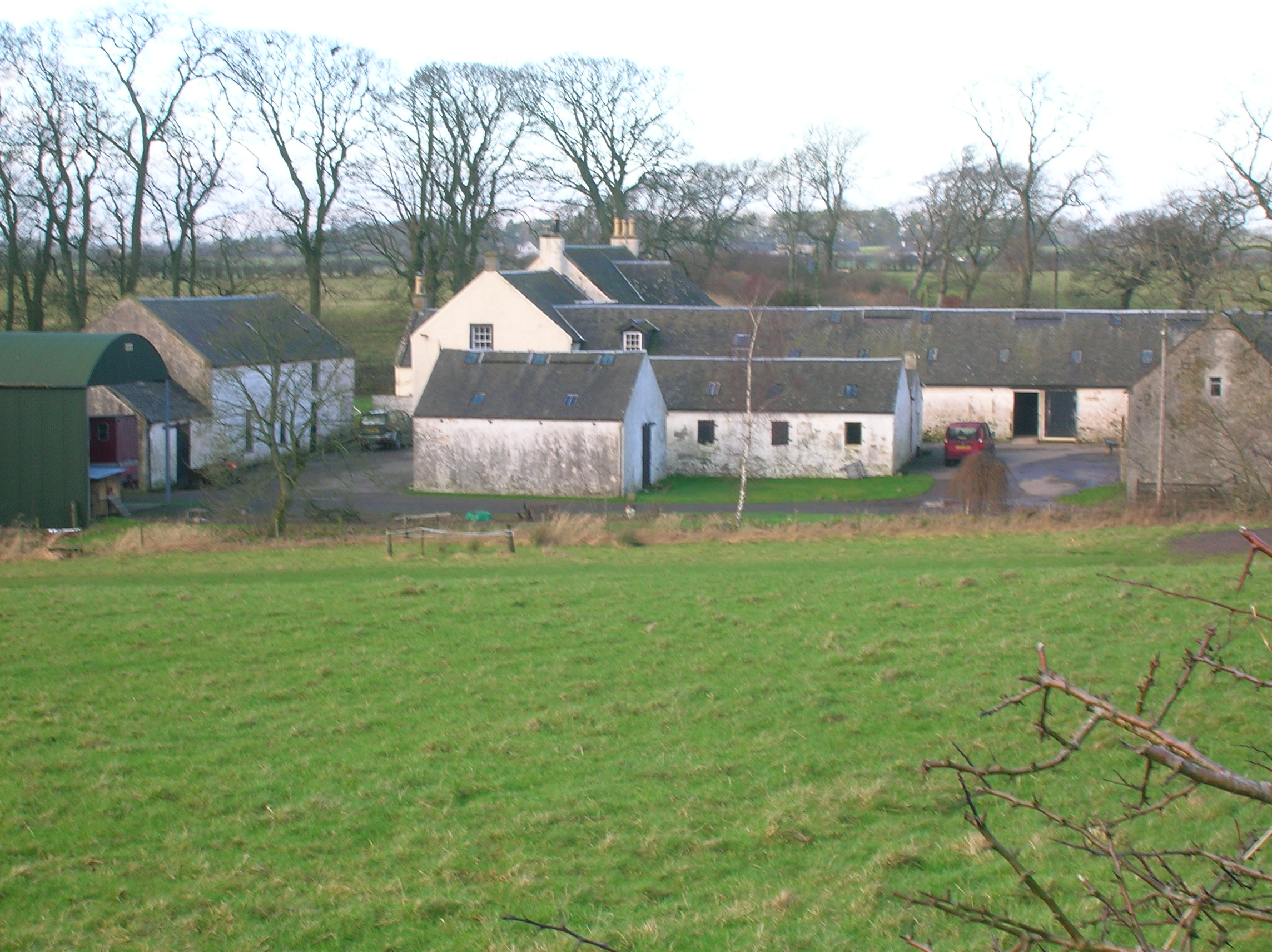
Titwood Farm

Robert's parents were Robert Burnes and Isabella Keith. He retained the spelling 'Burnes' throughout his life; however, his nephew favoured the Ayrshire spelling of 'Burns' and official records as well as his memorial inscription omit the 'e'.

Robert is said to have gone to England or Southern Scotland at first, working for some time as a gardener, having supposedly parted from his brother on the summit of Garvock Tap. He then lived for several years, arriving around 1748, certainly by 1781, in a cot house at Titwood Farm in Dreghorn Parish, where he worked in the summer months as a quarryman and possibly being apprenticed at some point as a stonemason. He would at some stage have been a cotter or agricultural worker. His brother William recorded in a letter dated 1781 that his brother lived in 'Stewarton' and that his circumstances were "rather indifferent." Robert attended his brother William's funeral in 1784.

Robert had severe rheumatoid arthritis or osteoarthritis that prevented him from doing hard physical work in the cold winter months and to maintain himself and his family he opened a school in his home for the sons of local farmers sons. When his condition became too painful and debilitating he moved to a house in the Buck's Head Close or to the Buck's Head Inn itself, located just off the main street in Stewarton and this may have been the house he once occupied mentioned in an 1896 Glasgow Herald article about a dwelling nicknamed the "stane stair", a two story thatched cottages next to the Happy Land lodging house that the Stewarton Town Council in 1910 condemned as “unfit for habitation” and had demolished. It had once had a stone stair that projected onto the street, hence the name. Later he moved to another house in the town with his family. Caldhame Farm on the Robertland Estate was the home of Robert, his wife Agnes Craig and their family whilst he was a land steward between at least 1774 and 1784. The family were said to have been upright, respectable and "..never had much wealth and at times their circumstances were far from affluent." They are said to have kept in close contact with Gilbert and Robert whilst they were living at Mossgiel.

Robert's nephew, the poet, is said to have had a sweetheart in Stewarton whom he met at a merry making in Kilmarnock. The girl was keen to marry Burns, but her parents were against it. She married a man named Black and the two raised a large family.

=== The Caldhame Letters ===
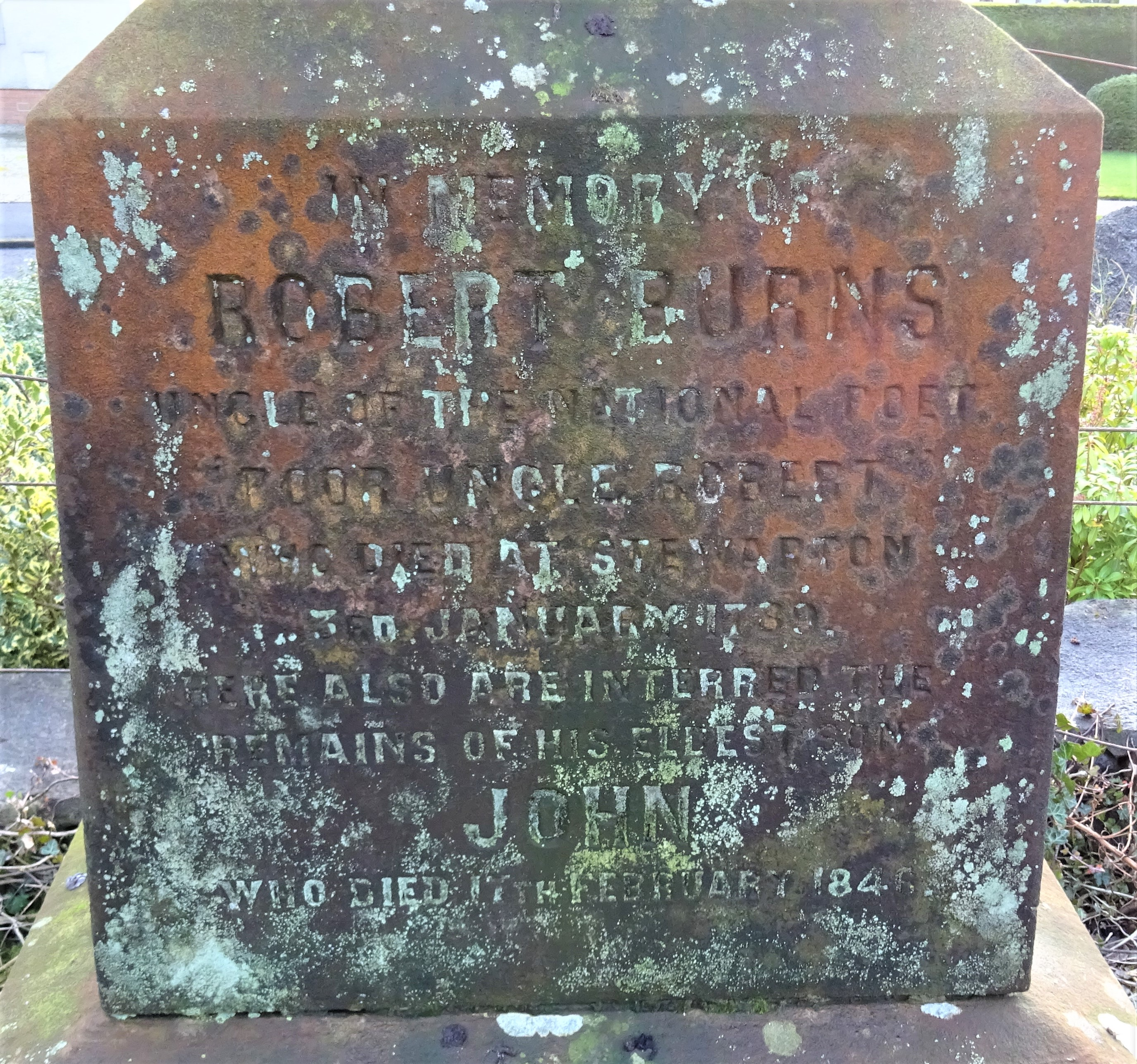
The memorial inscription on Robert and John's gravestone

Sir James Hunter Blair of Blairquhan uncovered six letters in his family's archive written between 1776 and 1779 by a Robert Burnes (never Burns) to the first baronet from Caldhame near Stewarton; a seventh letter was discovered recently by the Blairquhan Castle archivist. This individual was a land steward at the Robertland estate. William Logan, the Robertland Estate Factor living at Kilmaurs House or Place had employed a Robert Burnes and wrote a series of letters from May 1774 to 1784 to his employer that sometimes refer to a Robert Burnes.

This Robert had detailed knowledge of selecting kilned lime and the liming of crops, caring for cattle, and drainage work. Deputising for the absentee factor he collected rents and wrote to the laird. The existence of another person with the same name, approximate age, knowledge of liming, both married, well educated, etc. and living in the same area seems very unlikely and the birth record of Robert Burnes to Agnes and Robert gives the dwelling as 'Caldhame'. Sir James Hunter Blair died in 1787 and this event may have impacted his employment.

The Stewarton Parish Register of Births, Deaths and marriages records that this Robert Burnes had a son that was named Robert, registered on 29 January 1778, the mother being given as Robert's wife Agnes Craig and the residence is given as 'Caldhame'. A duplicate copy of the register confirms these details and gives the spelling 'Burnes'. This confirms that 'Poor Uncle Robert' became for a time the Robertland Estate land steward as related in the 'Caldhame Letters', working under the Factor, William Logan, first of Kilmaurs House and later Thornton House.

=== Family ===
Robert married Agnes Craig (b. circa 1735), on 7 November 1766 at Dreghorn, North Ayrshire. Titwood Farm lies in Dreghorn Parish. Agnes, however, died in October 1786 and was buried in Stewarton, probably in the Burnes family lair, but she is not recorded on the 1910 memorial itself. She died two years after her husband had written of her 'tender' condition.

Robert and Agnes had four children of whom John (b. 15 September 1767, d. 17 February 1846) was the oldest son, followed by William (b. 23 Mar 1769, d. 1850) and a daughter Fanny (Frances) (b. circa 1772, d. 23 Apr 1839). Robert Burnes, baptised on 29 January 1778 is recorded as having died young and certainly before 1784 as his father does not list him in a letter to Robert Burns that year.

==== Fanny Burnes ====
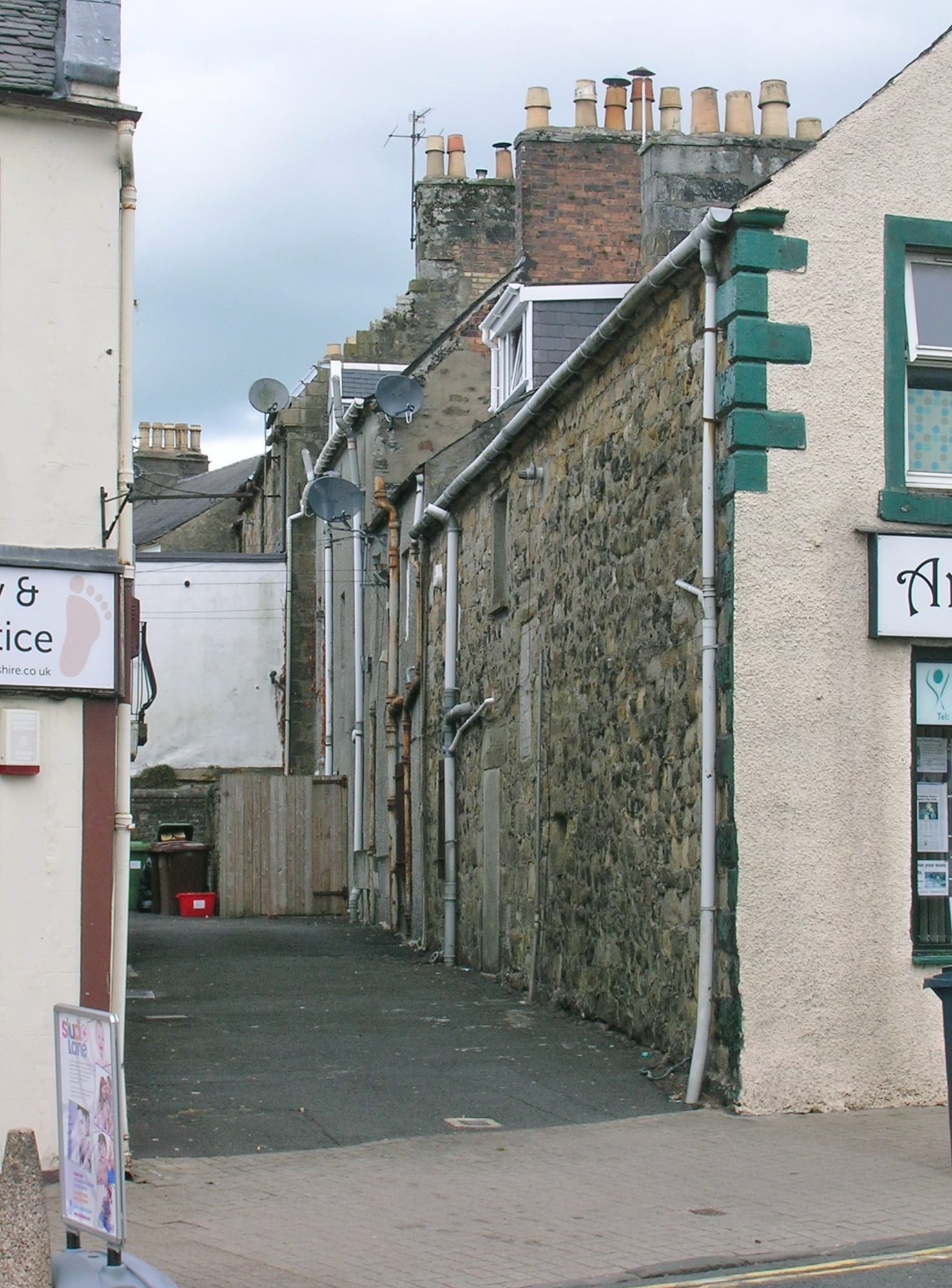
Buck's Head Close, Stewarton

Fanny whilst at Stewarton embroidered 'sprigs' on muslin used for babies' robes, veils, etc. The muslin was sent down from Paisley and Glasgow manufacturers and Fanny would work with others in her father's kitchen in the evenings. Robert Burns would sometimes visit them and her father would at times rebuke him for flirting with the ladyfolk.

Janet Dean's mother worked with Fanny and recollected that Robert Burns gave her a holograph copy of 'The Holy Fair' which the family treasured, but its whereabouts now is unknown.

Mrs Dunlop records in a letter of 22 January 1789 that Fanny had walked to Dunlop House to deliver a letter from Robert Burns, her cousin. On 17 July 1792 she likewise wrote that she had just seen Fanny who had given her a piece of her wedding-gown and that she would keep this as an important relic of her friendship with Robert Burns who had done so much to help his 'orphan' cousin.

Fanny (b. circa 1772, d. 23 Apr 1839) moved to Ellisland Farm when her father died and married at Mauchline on 5 June 1792. Fanny's husband was Adam Armour, a builder, brother of Jean Armour, thereby Fanny became Jean's sister-in-law as well as her cousin-in-law. The couples children were James; Jean; Robert; Fanny; Adam; Mary Smith; John and William.

Adam Armour was immortalised in the poem "Adam Armour's Prayer" and the couple had five sons and four daughters. Adam was an adherent of the 'Auld Licht' persuasion and as such was in direct opposition to Robert Burns whose poem relates an incident regarding an Agnes Wilson, a maid at Poosy Nancy's, who was thought to be a prostitute. Adam Armour and a group of associates placed her on a pole and rode her out of town, injuring her private parts in the process. George Gibson, the landlord, attempted to take legal action and Adam hid until things quietened down. Burns records in the poem that she would have been hung had she been caught acting again as a prostitute. Fanny died in 1839.

==== John Burnes ====
John's (b. 15 September 1767, d. 17 February 1846) birth was registered in the Parish of Irvine. He is known to have helped guard the Stewarton St Columba Church graveyard against the activities of body snatchers or resurrectionists, although it is not known if this was as a volunteer or in paid capacity. For the last sixteen years or so of his life he lodged at the house of the mother of James Colquhoun in Stewarton. Mrs Colquhoun had attended John's funeral.

John Burnes may have worked as a farm labourer or as a weaver, but in his final years from 1843 he was a recipient of poor relief from the Stewarton parish as noted in the Heritors Records. He died on 17 February 1846, aged 78, and was buried next to his father under the 1910 memorial.

The Scotsman newspaper paper on 24 August 1844 reported that John was around 76 years old and was nearly bedridden, having broken both his legs in an accident thirty years before. He recalled that whilst living at Ellisland Farm he had been sent for the midwife when 'Colonel Burns' was born. Colonel William Nicol Burns occasionally sent John money and clothing.

Jean Wyllie of Mid Buiston Farm near Kilmaurs recalled that John or Jock worked for her father Hugh as a ploughman and that he was clever, good looking, but a bit of a rascal. John was able to recite 'The Twa Dogs' and 'The Cotter's Saturday Night'. He told a story of helping Robert Burns at Ellisland by burning whin at the entrance to the barn to 'smoke out' a group of Buchanites after they had taken shelter without seeking permission.

John also claimed that he had worked as a 'gaudsman' for his cousin Robert at Mossgiel Farm, assisting with the ploughing.

==== William Burnes ====
William (b. 23 Mar 1769, d. 1850) was intended to become a mason or building worker, working with James Armour, Robert Burns's father-in-law. He married Ann Newlands, fathering several children and dying in 1850 at an advanced age. Another source states that William never married and lived to an advanced age, dying in 1850. He had worked as a builder. His birth was registered in the parish of Irvine.

==== Robert Burnes ====
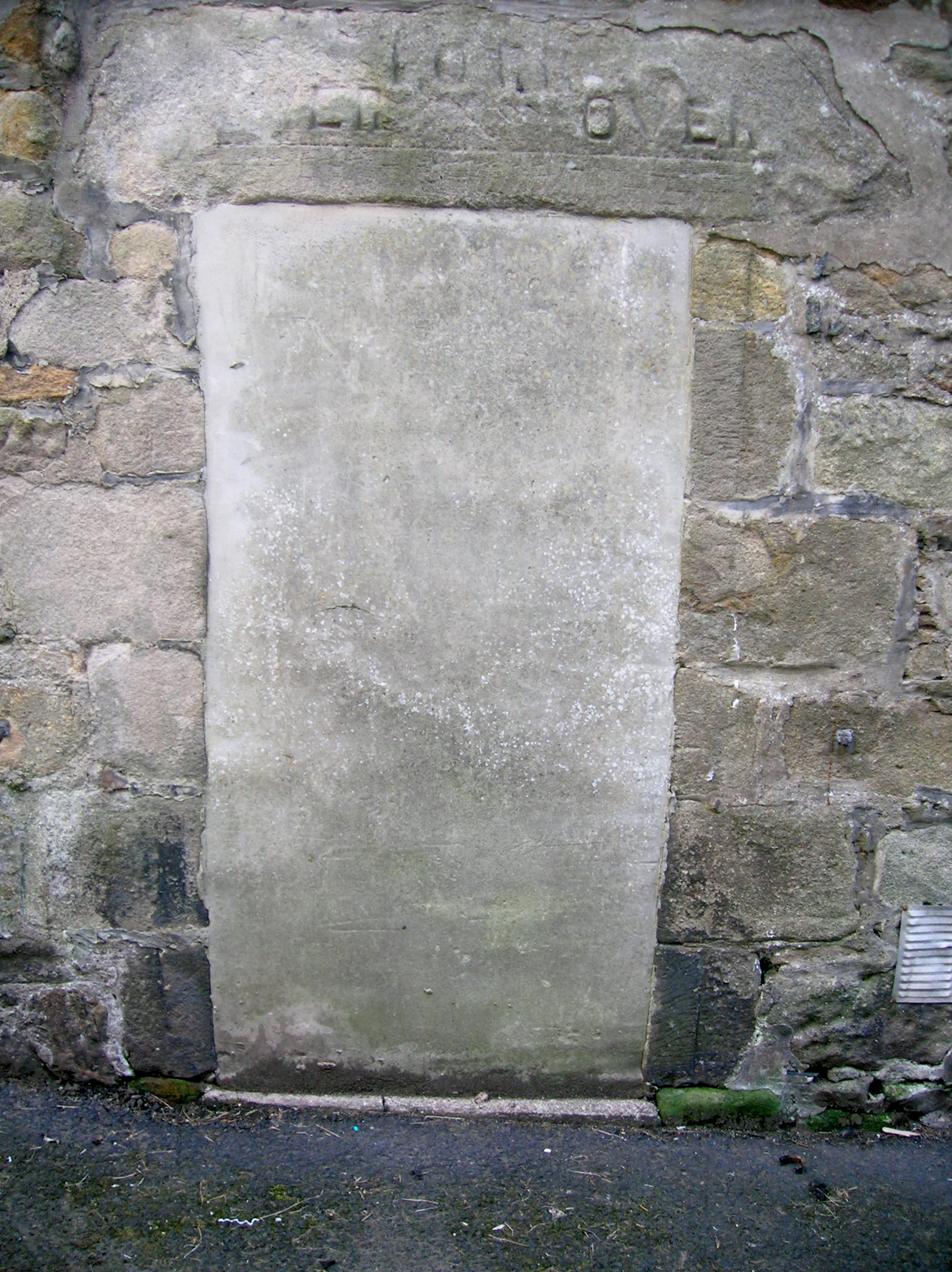
The old front door of the Buck's Head Tavern bearing the inscription 'Over Fork Over'. Stewarton's motto at one time and that of the Cunninghame family.

A 'Robert Burnes' was born to Agnes Craig and Robert Burnes on 29 January 1778 in Stewarton Parish with the dwelling place given as Caldhame, confirming that Robert was at the time the Land Steward at the Robertland Estate. This Robert had died before 1781 as his Uncle William does not list him in a letter that he wrote that year to his nephew James Burnes. He is also not mentioned in a letter of 1784 written by his father to his nephew Robert Burns.

==== Helen Burnes ====
A Helen Burns is recorded as being buried at Stewarton on 13 August 1803.

=== Death and memorial ===
On 3 January 1789 Robert died at Stewarton although for long he was thought to have died at Ellisland. Robert was a popular and much respected figure in the area and he is buried in a prime location in Stewarton's St Columba Church cemetery where in 1910 the Stewarton Literary Society erected a memorial obelisk made of Ballochmyle red sandstone to him and to his eldest son John who had died on 17 February 1846 and is buried next to him. Several other members of the family were also buried in the lair.

On the day of the unveiling the Stewarton Burgh Band marched through the streets and Andrew Kerr, President of the Stewarton Literary Society hosted the proceedings. The whole project had originally begun following a talk delivered by Duncan McNaught of Kilmaurs and the honour was given to him to unveil the memorial.

== Association with Robert Burns ==
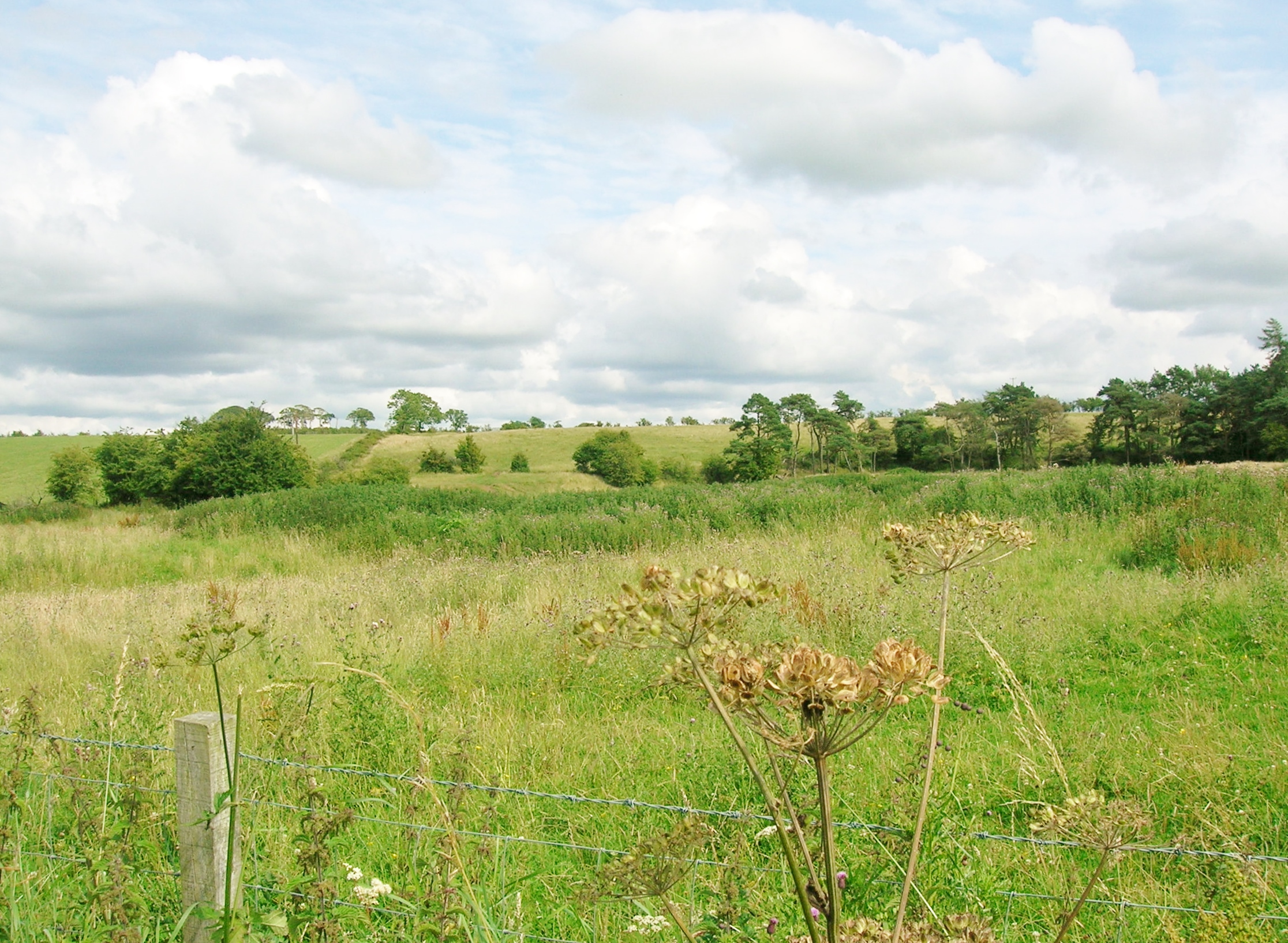
Lochridge old limestone quarry site

Robert Burns used to visit his uncle in Stewarton at the Buck's Head Close or at the Buck's Head Inn, one of the oldest buildings in the town, as he was sometimes in the area from late 1786 on his journeys to visit Frances Dunlop at Dunlop House nearby; he also visited nearby Robertland House. He is said to have stayed at the inn.

When Robert Burnes died, his nephew Robert did what he could to help John, William and Fanny Burnes, his cousins, to gain employment. In February 1789 Robert Burns wrote from Ellisland Farm to his cousin, James Burnes in Montrose from Ellisland, saying: "We have lost poor uncle Robert this winter... His son William, has been with me this winter, and goes in May to bind himself to be a Mason with my father in law who is a pretty considerable architect in Ayrshire. His other son, the eldest, John, comes to me, I expect in Summer.... His only daughter, Fanny, has been with me ever since her father's death and I purpose to keep her in my family til she be quite woman grown, and be fit for better service. She is one of the cleverest girls, and has one of the most amiable dispositions, that I have ever seen." Both John and Fanny therefore lived with the Burns family for a time from 1789 at Ellisland Farm.

== Chronology ==
1748 (Circa) – Robert living at Titwood Farm in Dreghorn Parish.

1766 – Robert (Aged 46/7) marries Agnes Craig at Dreghorn.

1767 – John Burnes born in Irvine.

1769 – William Burnes born in Irvine.

1771 – (Circa) Fanny (Frances) Burnes born.

1774 to 1784 – William Logan, Robertland Estate factor appoints Robert Burnes (aged 54/55) as a land steward. Family move to Caldhame Farm.

1776 to 1779 – Letters written by Robert Burnes to Sir James Hunter Blair.

1778 – Robert Burnes is born and had died before 1781.

1781 – William Burnes writes that his brother was living in 'rather indifferent' circumstances.

1784 – Robert writes to Robert Burns and comments that his wife has been 'tender', meaning sickly that he is also not well and lists just three children.

1784 – Robert attends his brother William's funeral.

1786 – Robert's wife, Agnes Craig, dies and is buried in Stewarton.

1787 – Death of Sir James Hunter Blair of Robertland.

1789 – Robert dies at Stewarton aged 69/70. Fanny Burnes moves to Ellisland.

1790 – William, John and Fanny living at Ellisland.

1792 – Fanny marries Adam Armour.

1803 – A Helen Burnes dies and is buried at Stewarton.

1846 – John Burnes dies and is buried at Stewarton.

1850 – William Burnes dies.

1910 – Memorial stone to Robert and John unveiled.

== See also ==
- Adam Armour (Son-in-Law)
- Jean Armour (Niece-in-Law}
- Gilbert Burns (Nephew)
- Isabella Burns (Niece)
- William Burnes (Brother)
- Agnes Broun (Sister-in-Law)
