= Adam Armour =

Adam Armour may refer to:

- Adam Armour (soccer) (born 2002), American soccer player
- Adam Armour (Robert Burns) (1771–1823), brother-in-law of the poet Robert Burns and builder
