= Adam Armour (Robert Burns) =

Scottish builder

- Born: 27 February 1771; Mauchline, Scotland
- Died: 8 January 1823 (aged 51)
- Occupation: Builder
- Spouse: Fanny Burnes
- Children: 9
- Parent(s): James Armour; Mary Smith

Adam Armour (1771–1823) was the younger brother of Jean Armour and therefore the brother-in-law of the poet Robert Burns. In addition, being married to Fanny (Frances) Burnes, he was also related to the poet through his father-in-law (Robert Burnes) 'Poor Uncle Robert', who lived at Stewarton.

== Life and background ==
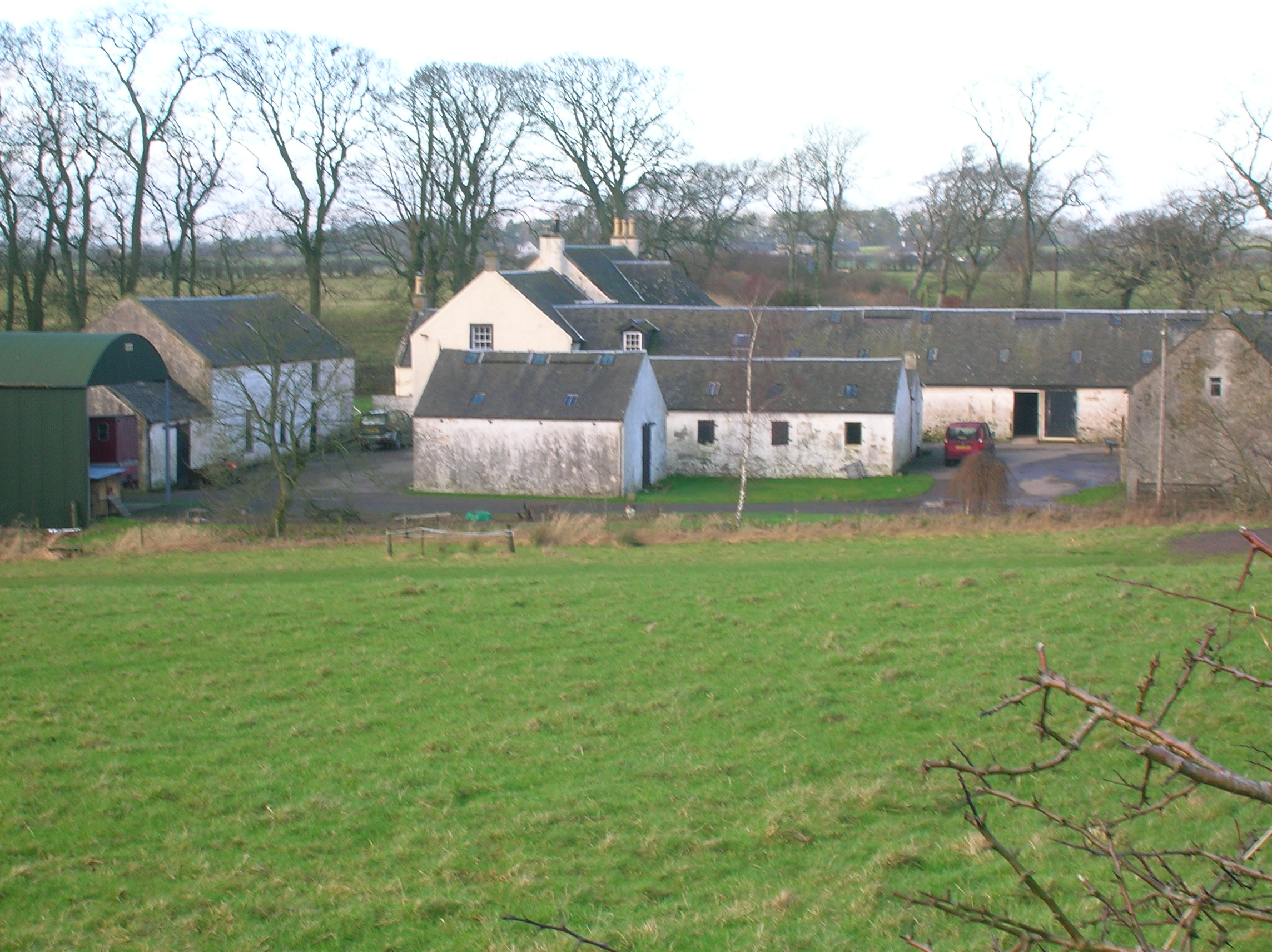
Fanny Burnes, Adam's wife, may have been born at Titwood farm where her father lived for a number of years whilst working at the nearby Lochridge limestone quarry.

Baptised on 3 March 1771 at Mauchline Adam was a builder, as was his father, the master mason James Armour (15 January 1731 – 25 September 1798), father-in-law of the poet Robert Burns. His mother was Mary Smith (died 30 July 1805) who married at Mauchline on 7 December 1761 and his siblings were John Armour, Jean (Armour) Burns, James Armour, Robert Armour, Helen Armour, Mary Armour, Robert Armour, Mary Armour, Janet Armour and Robert Armour. He is thought to have been of small stature, alluded to by Burns in "Adam Armour's Prayer" where he has Adam say "Gude pity me, because I'm little!" His portrait is listed in 1962 as being in the National Burns Tower Museum in Mauchline. Adam was named for Adam Smith, James Armour's father-in-law.

=== Family ===
Adam met Fanny Burnes at Ellisland Farm as her cousin Robert Burns had taken her and her brothers in after the death of her father Robert in 1789. Adam was for a time employed at the nearby Dalswinton House as a builder, lodging at Ellisland with his sister and brother-in-law and therefore sharing the house with Fanny amongst others.

On 5 June 1792 Adam is said to have married Fanny at Dalswinton that lies near Ellisland, however the wedding is also said to have taken place at Mauchline. The couple had nine children, James (b. 16 March 1793, d. 29 January 1816), Jean (b. 4 December 1794, d. 22 October 1796), Robert (b. 15 March 1799, d. 6 March 1849), Fanny (b. 8 January 1801), Adam (b. 9 March 1803), Mary Smith (b. 15 October 1805), John (24 Dec 1807, d. 14 June 1809) and William (b. 25 January 1812, d. c 1859). Adam died on 8 January 1823 aged 51.

== Association with Robert Burns ==
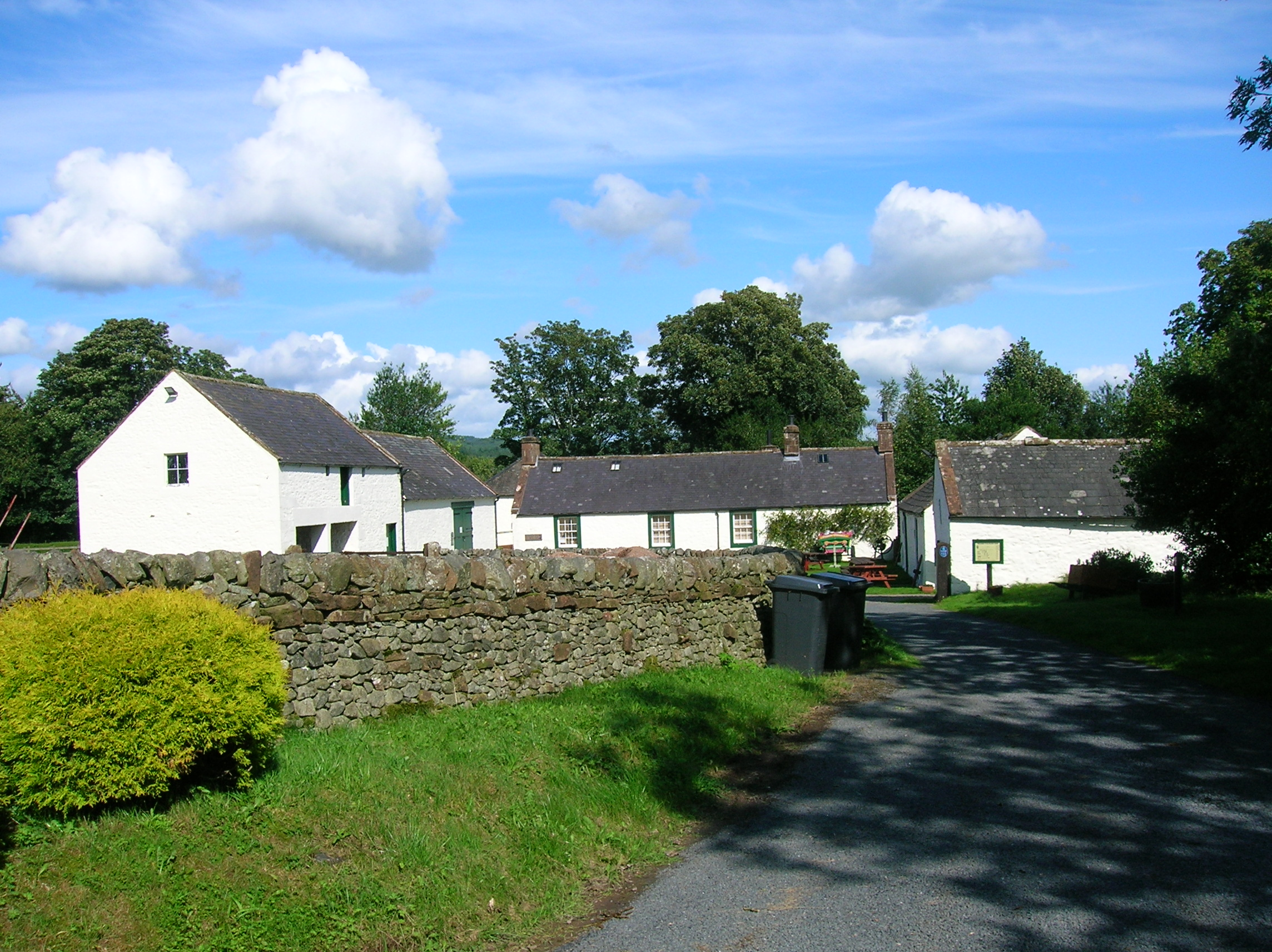
Ellisland Farm where Adam Armour first met Fanny Burnes.

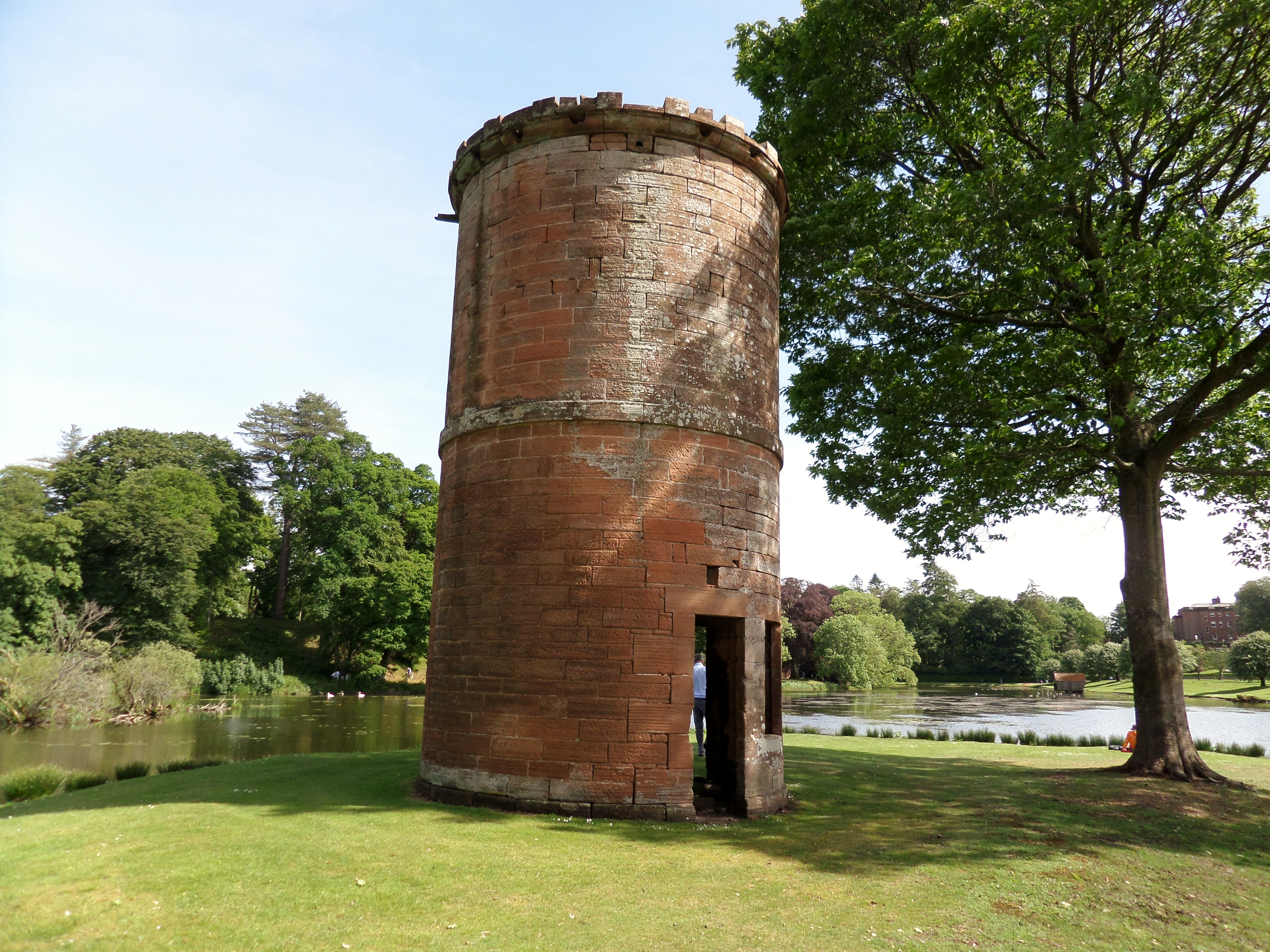
A folly at Dalswinton Loch with the mansion in the background to the right hand side. Adam Armour was employed as a builder here for a time and lodged at Ellisland Farm.

It was Adam who was sent to Mossgiel to inform Robert that his sister Jean had given birth to the poet's son and daughter, named after the parents through the Kirk Session protocol for children born out of wedlock. It was said that Adam found Burns working at the plough however the day being a Sunday this is highly unlikely.

When the poet's Uncle Robert died he did what he could to help John, William and Fanny (Frances) Burnes, his cousins, to gain employment. In February 1789 Robert Burns wrote from Ellisland Farm to his cousin, James Burnes in Montrose from Ellisland, saying: "We have lost poor uncle Robert this winter .... His only daughter, Fanny, has been with me ever since her father's death and I purpose to keep her in my family til she be quite woman grown, and be fit for better service. She is one of the cleverest girls, and has one of the most amiable dispositions, that I have ever seen." Both John and Fanny lived with the Burns family for a time from 1789 at Ellisland Farm.

Robert paid Adam six shillings in November 1791 to return to Ellisland at the dead of night to smash every window in the farm upon which he had inscribed verses as an act of revenge upon James Morin, Laird of Laggan who was the new owner. Robert felt cheated over the price paid for a heap of manure, a valuable commodity before artificial fertilisers were available. No record of the verses has survived. Adam carried out the task and in 1813 he related the incident to a Dumfriesshire man. Adam Armour and Fanny Burnes's signatures were on a window pane in the southern window of the parlour and a favourite quote from Alexander Pope "An honest man's the noblest work of God." in what may have been Burns's handwriting. A record survives of the charges placed upon Burns for 'dilapidations' at Ellisland and is for 'Glass' six shillings!

=== The Agnes Wilson incident ===
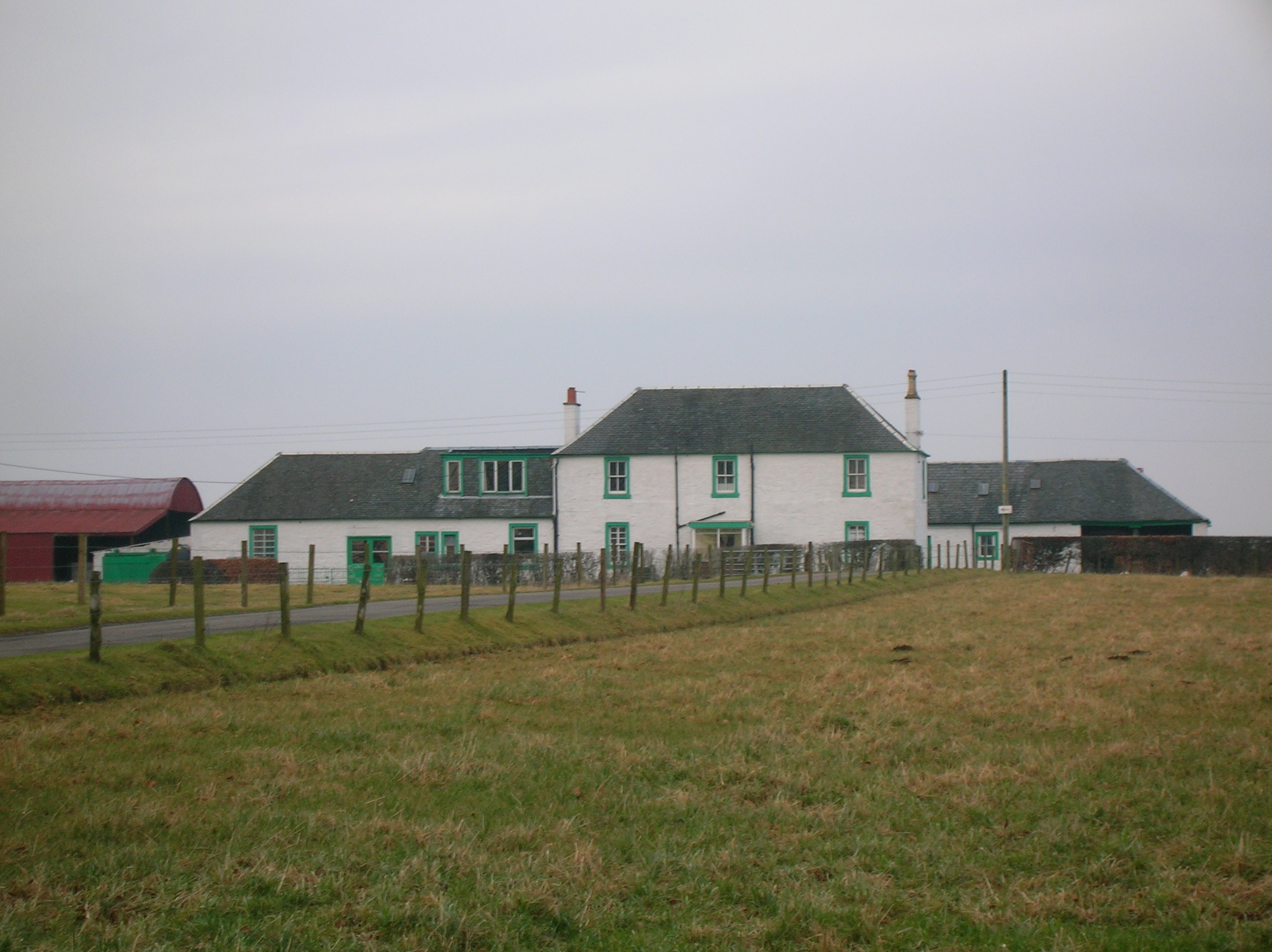
Adam Armour hid at Mossgiel Farm for a time after the Agnes Wilson affair.

Agnes Wilson was a female servant or journeywoman who worked for George Simpson, the landlord of Poosie Nancie's. She had a reputation as a prostitute and Adam Armour at the age of 15 led a group of 'Auld Licht' adherents who decided to run her out of town. The gang obtained a rough pine tree pole, suspended it between horses and forced her to sit astride it. The experience caused her significant physical injury as Burns' poem describes. George (Geordie) Simpson and his wife Agnes (Poosie Nancie) greatly resented this cruel and lawless behaviour and proceeded to prosecute Adam and his group. The Kirk Session noted the disturbance on 6 March 1786.

Following this breach of the peace, and while evading arrest, Adam met Burns, and asked for his advice. Burns is said to have suggested that he would be best to find someone to pray for him, and Adam to have replied: "Just do't yoursel, Burns, I know no one so fit." Adam asked if he could lie low at Mossgiel until the situation calmed down and Burns agreed. It was on this occasion that Burns discovered from Adam that his sister, Jean Armour, had been sent to stay with an uncle in Paisley.

As a result of the affair Burns wrote 'The Prayer' or 'Adam Armours Prayer' that, although well known in Mauchline was not published until 1808 when it appeared in the Edinburgh Magazine. It was a prelude to Holy Willie's Prayer.

"Adam Armour's Prayer" By Robert Burns

"Gude pity me, because I'm little!
For though I am an elf o' mettle,
An' can, like ony wabster's shuttle,
Jink there or here,
Yet, scarce as lang's a gude kail-whittle,
I'm unco queer.

An' now Thou kens our waefu' case;
For Geordie's jurr we're in disgrace,
Because we stang'd her through the place,
An' hurt her spleuchan;
For whilk we daurna show our face,
Within the clachan.

An' now we're dern'd in dens and hollows,
And hunted, as was William Wallace,
Wi' constables-thae blackguard fallows,
An' sodgers baith;
But Gude preserve us frae the gallows,
That shamefu' death!

Auld grim black-bearded Geordie's sel',
O shake him owre the mouth o' hell!
There let him hing, an' roar, an' yell
Wi' hideous din,
And if he offers to rebel,
Then heave him in.

When Death comes in wi' glimmerin blink,
An' tips auld drucken Nanse the wink,
May Sautan gie her doup a clink
Within his yett,
An' fill her up wi' brimstone drink,
Red-reekin het.

Though Jock an' hav'rel Jean are merry,
Some devil seize them in a hurry,
An' waft them in th' infernal wherry
Straught through the lake,
An' gie their hides a noble curry
Wi' oil of aik!

As for the jurr-puir worthless body!
She's got mischief enough already;
Wi' stanged hips, and buttocks bluidy
She's suffer'd sair;
But, may she wintle in a woody,
If she wh-e mair!"

This incident is related to the "Court of Equity" of which Burns was a member that in 1785 and 1786 met at the vinter John Dow's house in Mauchline where they debated the cases of scandal taking place in the village and –

"To punish contravening truants
At instance of our constituents,
And, under proper regulation,
To purge the lists of forn—n."

Burns has Adam state in his poem that Agnes Brown would have been hung had she been caught acting again as a prostitute.

== See also ==
- Jean Armour
- Robert Burnes
- William Burnes
