= Gilbert Burns (farmer) =

Scottish farmer (1760–1827)

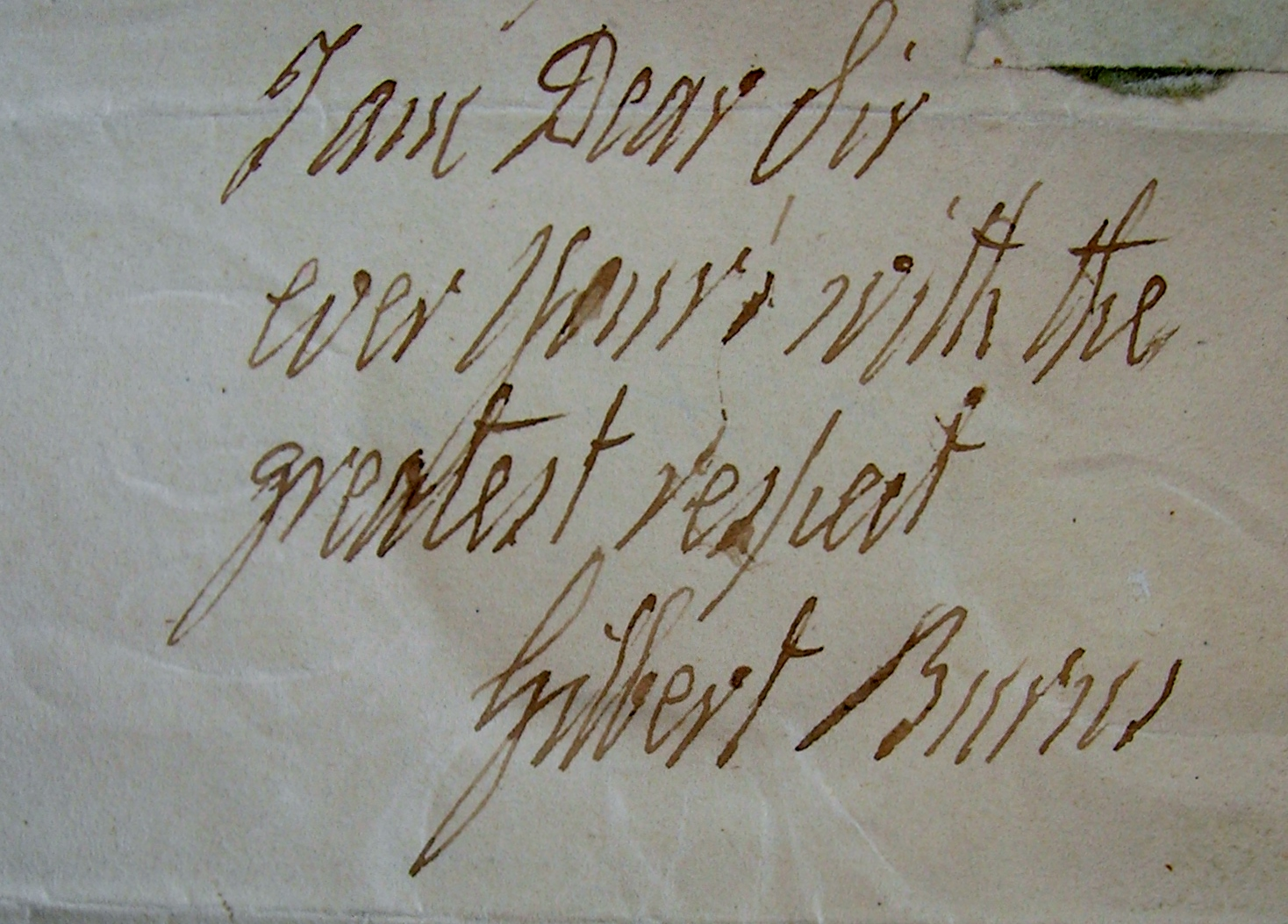
- Gilbert Burns's signature
- Born: 28 September 1760; Alloway, South Ayrshire, Scotland
- Died: 8 April 1827 (aged 66); Bolton, East Lothian, Scotland
- Occupations: Farmer and then factor
- Spouse: Jean Breckenridge
- Children: 11
- Parent(s): William Burnes; Agnes Broun

Gilbert Burns (1760–1827), the younger brother of Robert Burns the poet, was born at Alloway. He married Jean Breckenridge in 1791, had six sons and five daughters, died in 1827, aged 66, and was buried at Bolton, East Lothian, Scotland. Gilbert's writings have contributed greatly to the bank of knowledge that exists regarding the life of his famous brother.

== Life and character ==
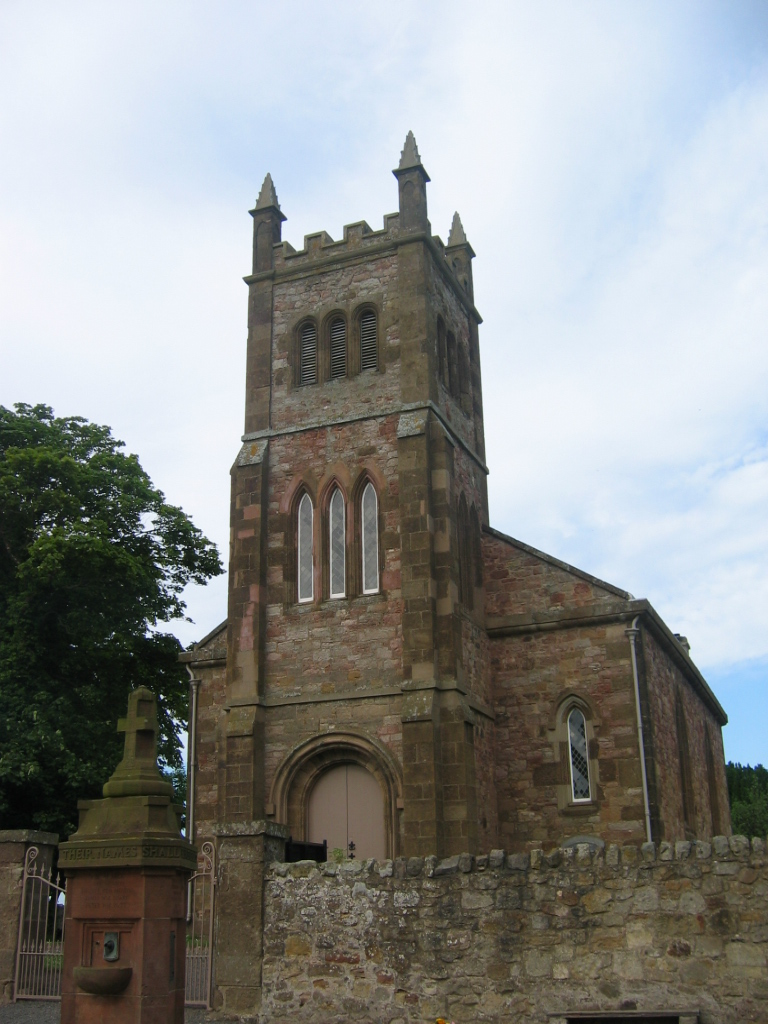
Bolton Church

Gilbert's elder brother was Robert Burns the poet, born on 25 January 1759, Gilbert following in 1760, Agnes in 1762, Annabella in 1764, William in 1767, John in 1769 and finally Isabella in 1771. Gilbert's parents were William Burnes and Agnes Broun. Gilbert was also the name of his grandfather on his mother's side.

In 1766 the family moved from Alloway near Ayr to their first rented farm, Mount Oliphant. Life at Mount Oliphant was very hard for Gilbert and he describes in his letters how extreme hard work was the only way that his family could survive and that their diet and life was one of austerity with butcher's meat non existent.

In 1777 Gilbert and the family moved to the 130 acre farm at Lochlea where they remained for seven years, during which time the brothers sub-leased a parcel of land from their father where they grew flax. Gilbert and Robert sub-leased the 118 acres (48 ha) Mossgiel Farm on 11 November 1783 from Gavin Hamilton, who as well as being a writer in Mauchline was the Earl of Loudoun's factor for his estates in the Mauchline area and he himself held the lease on Mossgiel. Gilbert described how Mossgiel was unprofitable and the brothers were forced to give up the lease in 1788 and rescue what they could from their joint venture.

Gilbert's comments on farming to James Currie were "I can say, from my own experience, that there is no sort of farm labour inconsistent with the most refined and pleasurable state of the mind that I am acquainted with, thrashing alone excepted. That, indeed, I have always considered as insupportable drudgery; and think the ingenious mechanic who invented the thrashing machine, ought to have a statue among the benefactors of his country, and should be placed in the niche next to the person who introduced the culture of potatoes into this island".

His father had a profound influence as illustrated by a statement made by him "... that nothing was more unworthy the character of a man, than that his happiness should in the least depend on what he should eat or drink. So early did he impress my mind with this, that although I was as fond of sweetmeats as children generally are, yet I seldom laid out any of the halfpence which relations or neighbours gave me, at fairs, in the purchase of them; and if I did, every mouthful I swallowed was accompanied with shame and remorse; and to this hour I never indulge in the use of any delicacy, but I feel a considerable degree of self-reproach and alarm for the degradation of the human character."

In 1780 Gilbert was a founder member of the Tarbolton Bachelors' Club.

The Irvine Burns Club was presented in 1984 with a letter written by Gilbert that gives an insight into his job and personality. The letter was to Dr Coventry from Gilbert Burns of Grants Braes by Haddington, 15 March 1816:

"Dear Sir, I am directed by Lady Blantyre to trouble you again to look for the measurement of Eaglescairnie Mains and send it to me for her Ladyship says you are apt to forget. Obviously the expense of a new measurement will be inserted subservient to the process at present depending before the other if respecting the fallow of that farm if we cannot soon produce the one made by Dickenson. Apropos will you be so good as misses no opportunity of getting legal information how for a landlord obliged to remove from the tenants inability to fulfill his engagements is liable to pay for labour done or seed sown on the farm at the time the removal takes place."

Gilbert has been described as being "methodical, somewhat timid, and determined not to offend the gentry", and in addition he is regarded by others as lacking his brother's flair, wit and genius. Dr John McKenzie wrote that Gilbert was very capable and knowledgeable, taking after his father in "manner and appearance".

Gilbert is said to have courted Jean Ronalds of the Bennals Farm near Mossblown.

=== Education ===
Gilbert began his education, learning the basics of writing and reading, at William Campbell's school at Alloway Mill. However, after a short time Campbell closed the school and moved to Ayr where he took charge of the workhouse. Gilbert's father responded by employing John Murdoch, whose father was also a schoolmaster, to provide an education, in co-operation with four of his neighbours. John Murdoch regarded Gilbert as being an able student like his brother, however the one most likely to succeed in life, having a better imagination and a more lively wit than his brother Robert at this time. Gilbert continued to attend the school even after the family had moved to Mount Oliphant and only left when the school was closed in 1768.

Gilbert described his time at Mount Oliphant saying "Nothing could be more retired than our general manner of living at Mount Oliphant; we rarely saw any body but the members of our own family. There were no boys of our own age, or near it, in the neighbourhood. Indeed the greater part of the land in the vicinity was at that time possessed by shopkeepers, and people of that stamp, who had retired from business, or who kept their farm in the country at the same time that they followed business in the town." It was also recorded by Gilbert that at this time his relationship with his father was such that despite his age he was treated by him as an adult and that their conversation whilst at work covered a wide range of topics intended to educate and to keep him on the straight and narrow in relation to moral behaviour.

In 1772 Gilbert was sent on alternate weeks to the Dalrymple parish school following a visit by John Murdoch; their father could not spare them both from the farm chores. Gilbert at this time was reading literature that the average adult today would struggle to appreciate and understand. Gilbert was not sent to the school at Kirkoswald that his elder brother famously attended.

Gilbert's religious education was partly taught at home by his father, using the A Manual of Religious Belief that William Burnes had written for that purpose, assisted by John Murdoch. After his father's death the manual remained with him and was eventually donated to the Robert Burns Birthplace Museum in Alloway.

=== Married life ===
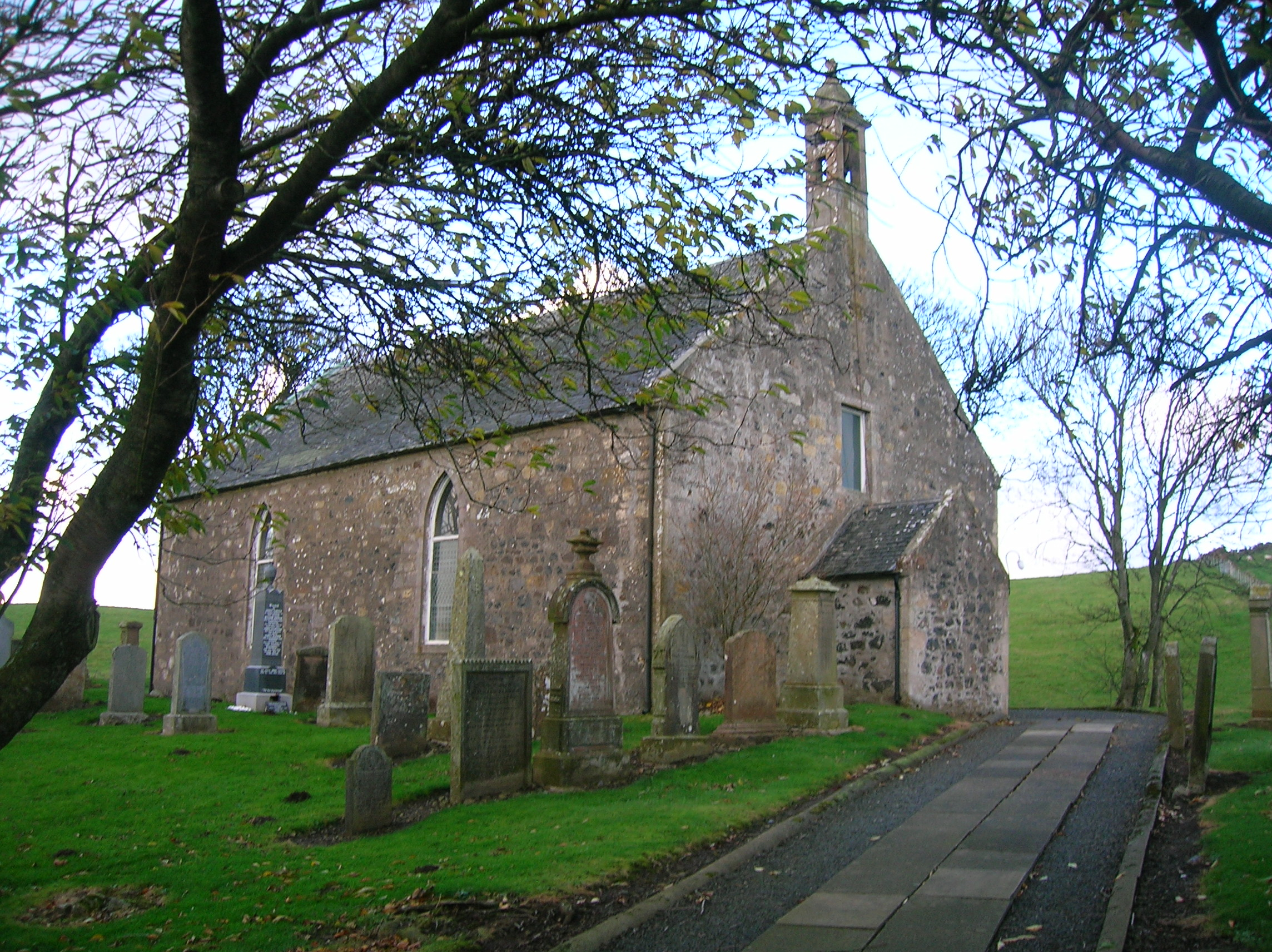
Craigie Church, where Gilbert and Jean were married in 1791

On 21 June 1791 Gilbert married Jean Breckenridge (Feb. 6th 1764 – Sept. 30th 1841) of Kilmarnock at Craigie near Ayr with whom he had no less than 11 children, named Agnes, Anne, Gilbert, Isabella, James, Janet, Jean, John, Robert, Thomas, and William. In addition to this large family his mother lived with the family until she died in 1820 at the age of 88, and his unmarried sister Annabella was also a part of the household, outliving her brother by 5 years.

Robert provided Gilbert with sufficient funds to "aliment, clothe and educate" Elizabeth Paton Burns, his "dear-bought Bess", natural daughter by Elizabeth Paton.

Gilbert left Mossgiel Farm in 1798 and then farmed at Dinning in Nithsdale for two years where he is recorded as having made very fine cheese and introducing the Ayrshire method of dairy farming. Gilbert left Dinning before the lease was up as he was appointed by the son of Frances Dunlop, Captain John Dunlop, as estate manager at Morham West Mains, East Lothian for four years. John Begg, husband of his sister Isabella, took up the lease on Dinning.

After a few years at Morham West Mains Gilbert spent the remainder of his days as the factor of the Lennoxlove estates owned by Lady Katherine Blantyre. During this period he lived with his family near Haddington at Grant's Braes on the road to Bolton.

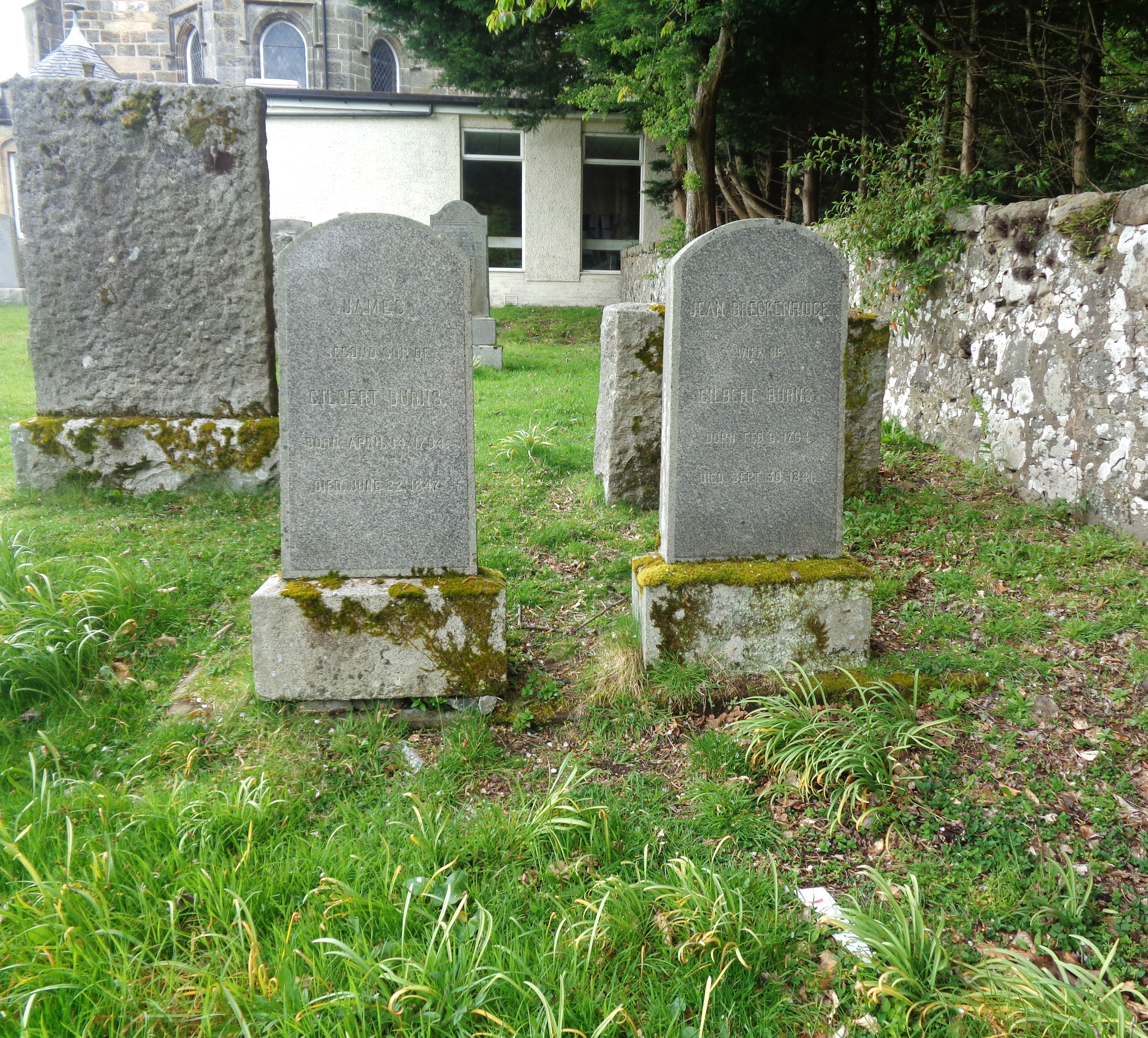
Gravestones of Jean Breckenridge Burns and her son, James Burns at Bishopton Parish Church

Gilbert was the treasurer of the Bolton Bible Society and in 1809 supervised the completion of Bolton church. In 1808 he was made an Elder of the Church and had responsibility for the areas of Begbie, Dalgowrie, Lethington, Westfield, Myreside, Colstoun, East and West Bearford, and Monkrigg.

After Gilbert's death Jean moved to live with her son James in Bishopton, Renfrewshire, where she worked at Erskine House for tbe Semple family. When she died in 1841 she was buried at Bishopton Parish Church; James was buried next to her on 22 June 1847.

Their son Thomas became a minister and was one of the founding fathers of Dunedin in New Zealand, a suburb of which is named Mosgiel (sic).

== Freemasonry ==
Like his elder brother, Gilbert was also a Scottish Freemason. He was Initiated, Passed and Raised on 1 March 1786 in Lodge St James (Tarbolton), No.135. His brother (in both senses of the word), Robert, presided over his brother's initiation.

=== Death ===
Bolton churchyard contains the family tombstone and records his mother's death as well as five of his children, Janet, Isabella, Agnes, Jean and John. In April 1827 Gilbert was buried here aged 66, and in 1832 his sister Annabella was the last to be buried here.

The text on the family tombstone reads -

"Erected by GILBERT BURNS, factor at Grants Brae in memory of his children ISABELLA who died 3 July 1815 in the 7th year of her age, AGNES who died 11th Sept 1815 in the 15th year of her age, JANET who died 30 Octr 1816 in the 18th year of her age. And of his mother, AGNES BROWN who died 14 Jany 1820 in the 88th year of her age; whose mortal remains lie all buried here. Also of other two of his children viz. JEAN who died on 4 Jany 1827 in the 20th year of her age and JOHN who died on the 26 Feby 1827 in the 25th year of his age. GILBERT BURNS thier [sic] father died on the 8 April 1827 in the 67th year of his age. Also buried here, ANNABELLA, sister of Gilbert Burns, who died March 2, 1832 aged 67."

Jean died in 1841, aged seventy seven, at her son James's house in Erskine, Renfrewshire having had to move out of Grant's Braes following her husband's death.

== Association with Robert Burns ==
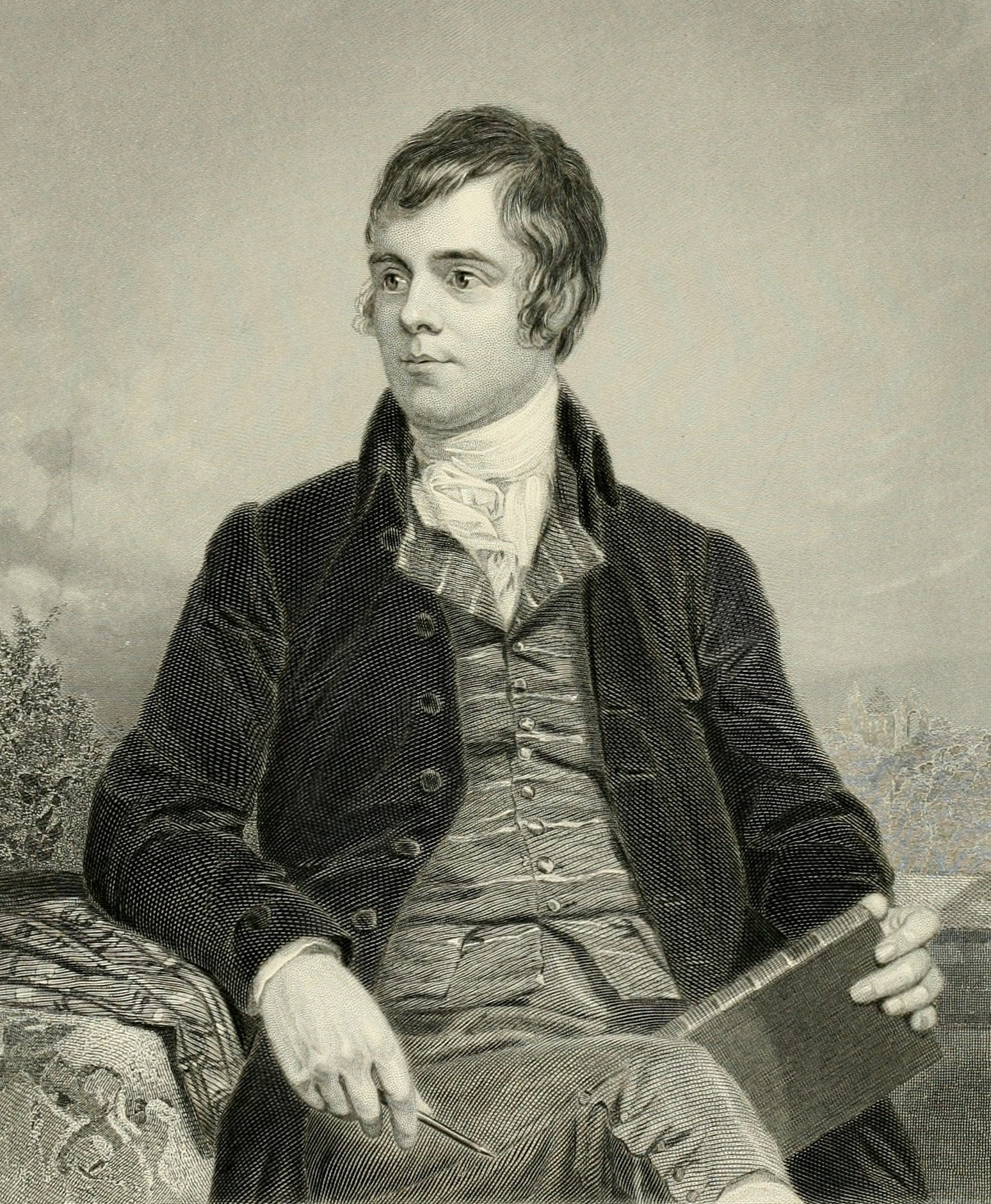
Robert Burns

It is said that Robert regarded his brother as his intellectual equal, as well as his trusted confidant and his best friend.

Valuable information about Robert's health as a young man as a teenager at Mount Oliphant were related by Gilbert such as how he suffered regularly from headaches, palpitations, faintness and feelings of likely suffocation.

Gilbert relates that when Robert was young he was shy and awkward with women, but that once he reached manhood he avidly sought female company and was constantly falling for members of the fair sex. He also records that he never saw his brother drunk during the seven years that they were at Lochlea. Another statement by Gilbert is that until Robert was 23 he acted with great respect towards women as he was keen to be seen as an eligible bachelor and the time he spent at Irvine was partly due to his desire to find a wife and settle.

It was Gilbert who first introduced David Sillar (1760–1830) to Robert and the Burns family. David later became a great friend of Robert and was the first vice-president of the Irvine Burns Club.

Gilbert says of Robert's days in Irvine that he here "contracted some acquaintances of a freer manner of thinking and living than he had been used to, whose society prepared him for overleaping the bounds of rigid virtue, which had hitherto restrained him". Robert himself stated that Richard Brown's views on illicit love "did me a mischief".

Gilbert sided with his sisters against his mother in advising Robert not to marry Elizabeth Paton after his affair which resulted in the birth of Elizabeith Paton Burns.

Gilbert contributed additional information to John Currie's The Works of Robert Burns (eighth edition) in 1820 and was paid £250 on the understanding that he would not comment on the accuracy of the author's portrayal of his brother.

In 1784 Gilbert had advised Robert that he should publish his poetry and had given his brother helpful feedback on his poem Epistle to Davie. Gilbert thought at the time that he was the first to put the thought into Robert's mind that he could become a published poet. He secured seventy subscribers to Roberts Poems chiefly in the Scottish Dialect.

Gilbert had borrowed or had received around £300 during the difficult days at Mossgiel and this was not paid off until after Robert Burns's death, the earnings from his contributions to Burns's biographers being used for this purpose. Much of this money was used to pay off gambling debts run up by his nephew Robert Burns.

After the move from Mossgiel in 1788 Gilbert saw little of his brother, however he did attend his funeral in Dumfries, the only close relative to do so.

Following Burns's death Gilbert wrote to Ainslie:"I could not help considering the fame of author as well as the respectability and peace of his friends in considerable danger from the publication of letters written on private and confidential subjects." He was concerned that the antiquarian and author, Cromek, had obtained many of Burns's letters and requested that when Ainslie was in London he should call upon Cromek and report back.

In the correspondence with the Burns Mausoleum Committee Gilbert came across as a rather negative person "It will readily occur to every gentleman concerned that however much I might be inclined it is a matter I cannot stir or be seen in. I am not very sanguine in my expectations of aid to the subscription in the neighbourhood." He wrote by way of explanation "I have been much and disagreeably occupied of late with sequestering stock and crop, attending meetings of creditors, the sale of bankrupts' subjects, etc, etc." The records show that he took no part in the fundraising and lived up to John Syme's summation "that monotonouus presbyterian Gilb".

Gilbert's Narrative refers to the letter that Gilbert wrote to Mrs Frances Dunlop. His importance to Burns's scholars particularly lies in the many insights that he has left of the origins of Robert Burns's literary works.

== Micro-history ==
Unlike his brother, Gilbert was a prominent member of the Mauchline Conversation Society that met to discuss a wide range of topics such as moral questions, politics, etc.

Sir James Shaw, Lord Mayor of London, was a nephew of Gilbert through his wife Jean Breckenridge. Shaw greatly assisted Robert Burns's children in their careers, especially in the cases of William Nicol Burns and James Glencairn Burns. Robert Burns junior was given a job in the Stamp Office in London through his influence, but was less than grateful.

== See also ==
- Jean Armour
- Agnes Broun
- Agnes Burns (Sister)
- Elizabeth 'Betty' Burns (Niece)
- Isabella Burns (Sister)
- William Burnes
- Robert Burnes (1719–1789)
