= Alloway Auld Kirk =

Coordinates: 55.42786°N 4.63762°W

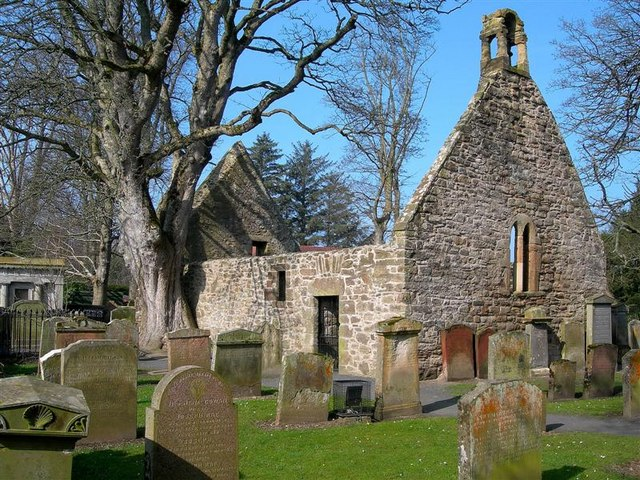

- Location within South Ayrshire
- Type: Church
- Location: Alloway
- OS grid reference: NS33191805

History
- Built: 16th century

Scheduled monument
- Official name: Alloway Kirk
- Type: Ecclesiastical: church
- Designated: 5 July 1927
- Reference no.: SM308

Listed Building – Category B
- Official name: Alloway Kirk Graveyard including Hughes Mausoleum, Gatepiers, Gates and Boundary Wall and excluding Scheduled Monument No 308, 'Alloway Kirk', Alloway
- Designated: 5 February 1971
- Reference no.: LB21471

The Alloway Auld Kirk, which dates back to the 16th century, is a church ruin in Alloway, South Ayrshire, Scotland, celebrated as the scene of the witches' dance in the poem "Tam o' Shanter" by Robert Burns.

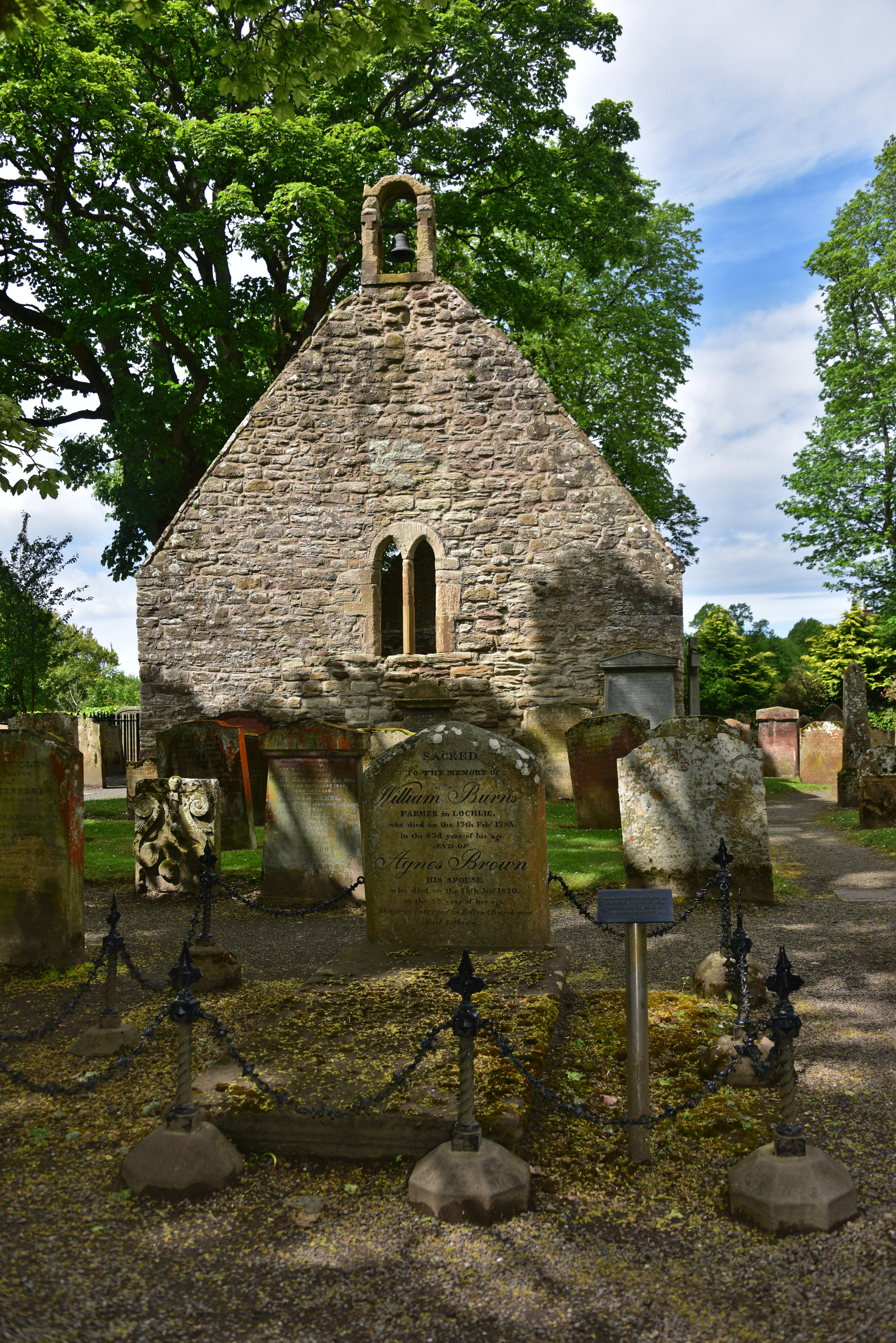
The kirk ruins and William Burnes's grave

== Robert Burns ==
William Burnes, father of the poet, is buried in the graveyard together with his daughter Isabella as well as two of his nieces. Alloway was where he and his wife had first raised their family before moving to Mount Oliphant and Lochlea, and William had attempted to maintain the grounds of the Kirk, which was already a ruin at the time. The original memorial stone has eroded and the present-day stone differs in wording, memorializing both of Burns's parents, and includes an epitaph the poet wrote for his father. Burns's sister, Isabella Burns Begg, is also buried in the Kirkyard, along with other notable figures such as David Cathcart, Lord Alloway.

Robert Burns presented his friend John Richmond with a silver mounted snuffbox made with wood taken from the rafters of the Auld Alloway Kirk. The snuffbox bears the inscription;

"Frae the oak that bare the riggin',
O Alloway's auld haunted biggin',
Frae the thorn aboon the well,
Whaur Mungo's mither hanged hersel'."

A David Auld removed the remaining rafters and used them to make chairs and other souvenirs, making a considerable profit from the sales.

== Restoration and conservation ==
Following restoration work, the Kirk and graveyard were reopened to the public by Scottish First Minister Alex Salmond in April 2008. The church itself is a scheduled monument and the churchyard a Category B listed building.

== See also ==
- List of Church of Scotland parishes
- Scheduled monuments in South Ayrshire
