= Mossgiel Farm =

Organic farm in Mauchline, East Ayrshire, Scotland

East Mossgiel Farm
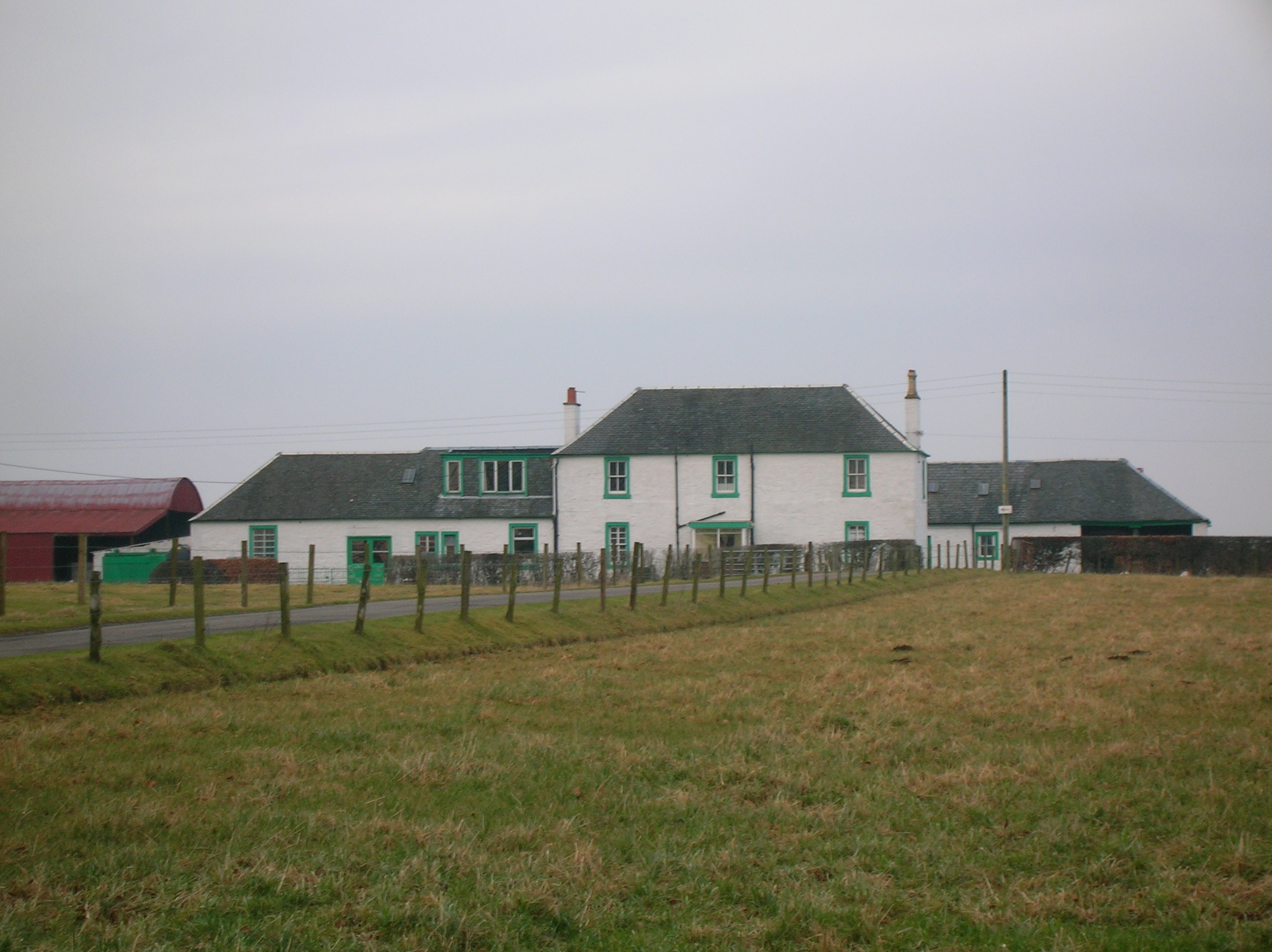
- The farmhouse in 2011

- Location within East Ayrshire
- Town/City: Mauchline
- State: East Ayrshire
- Country: Scotland
- Coordinates: 55.5263°N 4.394°W
- Produces: Dairy products
- Status: Open to the public

East Mossgiel Farm (Mossgaville Farm or Mossgavel Farm in Old Scots) is a tenanted farm in Mauchline, East Ayrshire, Scotland. It was the home of Robert Burns between 1784 and 1788, and was where he composed many of his best-known works, including "To a Mouse, on Turning Her Up in Her Nest with the Plough". At the time, the farm consisted of 118 acres (48 ha), and Burns and his brother, Gilbert, rented the property from Gavin Hamilton upon the death of their father.

While living there, Burns became acquainted with a group of girls collectively known as the Belles of Mauchline – one of whom, Jean Armour, was the daughter of a local stonemason. The two developed a relationship, and they were married in 1788. They had nine children, three of whom survived infancy.

During Burns's time at the farmhouse, it was a single-storey But'n'Ben cottage containing three small rooms. It is a two-storey farmhouse today.

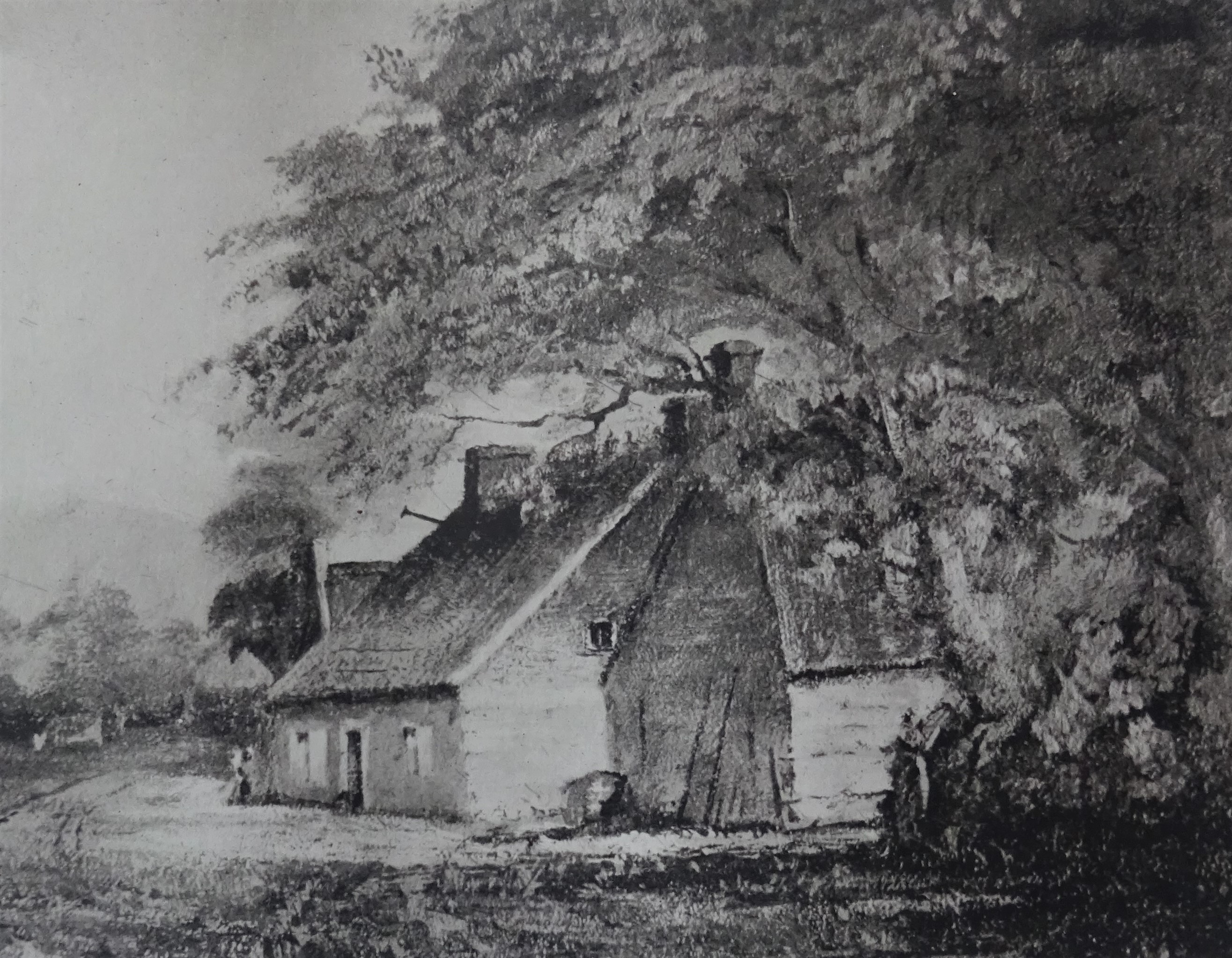
The farmhouse prior to the addition of a second storey

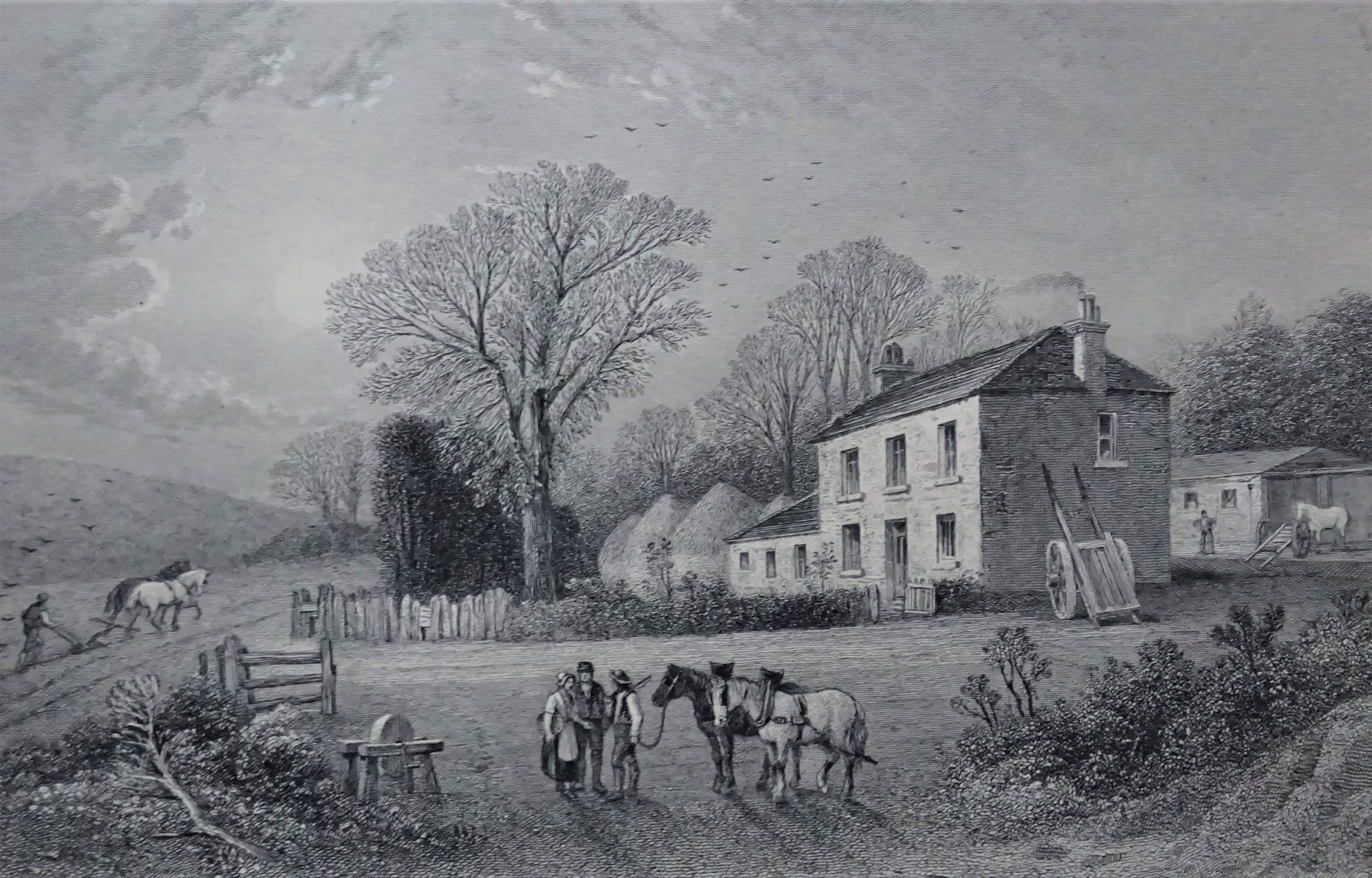
In the late 19th century
