= William Burnes =

Father of the poet Robert Burns (1721–1784)

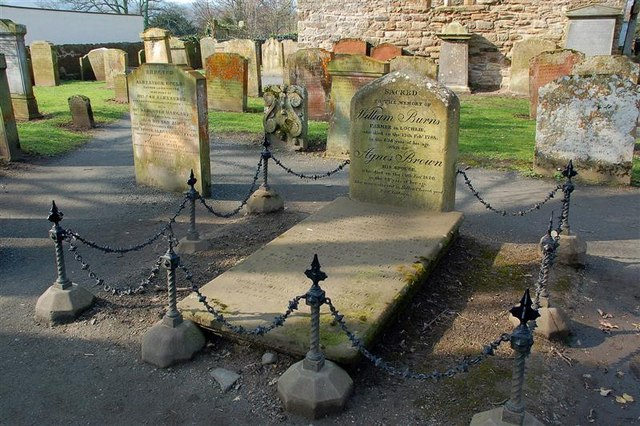
- William Burnes' grave in Alloway Kirk
- Born: 11 November 1721; Dunnottar, Kincardineshire, Scotland
- Died: 13 February 1784 (aged 62); Lochlea, South Ayrshire, Scotland
- Occupations: Gardener and farmer
- Spouse: Agnes Broun
- Children: 7, including Robert, Gilbert, Agnes, and Isabella
- Relatives: Robert Burnes (brother)

William Burnes or William Burness (11 November 1721 – 13 February 1784) was the father of the poet Robert Burns. He was born at either Upper Kinmonth or Clochnahill Farm, Dunnottar, Kincardineshire, and trained as a gardener at Inverugie Castle, Aberdeenshire, before moving to Ayrshire and becoming a tenant farmer. His parents were Robert Burnes and Isabella Keith. He retained the spelling 'Burnes' throughout his life; however, his son favoured the Ayrshire spelling of 'Burns'.

== Life and character ==
William had three brothers: George died young, James and Robert survived into adulthood. He had received a basic education that exceeded that of most boys of his time and was very competent in the three Rs, and displayed a very neat hand. The Burnes family are said to have had Jacobite sympathies, illustrated by the fact that William thought it necessary to get a certificate from three Kincardineshire landlords, testifying that he was "a very well-inclined lad". In 1748 his father, Robert Burnes, a gardener, who had ambitions as a farmer, was ruined by the economic depression that followed the Jacobite uprising of 1745.

At this time Edinburgh was known to have a demand for gardeners and William Burnes took the opportunity, spending the next two years landscaping for Sir Thomas Hope in the city, part of his work being in Hope Park, later known as The Meadows. He next found employment in Ayrshire, working first for the Laird of Fairlie in 1750, and later moving to Carrick and working near Maybole. He was a good worker and received a certificate of good character from the session clerk and minister of Dundonald. In 1754 he was employed by the Crawfords of Doonside for a period of two years, lodging at Doonside Mill and saving for his future, his father having probably died at around this time, freeing him from the maintenance payments he had been making to his retired father back at Denside. He was ambitious to set up as a nurseryman for himself so he feued, from Dr Alexander Campbell of Ayr, 7 1/2 acres (3 ha) of land at Alloway.

Unable to make a living in this way alone, or possibly seeing it as a better option, he obtained in the summer and autumn of 1757 a position as head gardener and overseer at Doonholm, the estate of a retired London doctor, Provost William Fergusson of Ayr. As overseer for two years he was fully employed and had the responsibility for "..laying out parks and gardens, planting of avenues of trees, construction of roads, re-planning of farms." on the various lands that had been purchased to become the Doonholm Estate.

In 1775 and 1776 Ayr Town Council awarded him the contract for laying out the new Greenfield Avenue and it was this work that provided him with the funds to purchase the aforementioned feu from Dr Alexander Campbell of Belleisle.

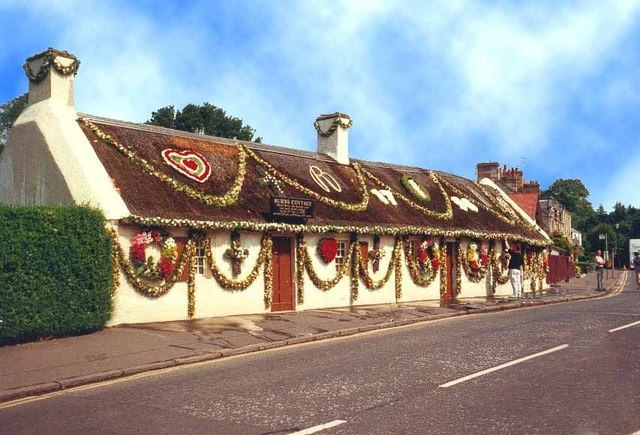
Burns Cottage, built by William Burnes at Alloway.

=== Marriage ===
Burnes, a tall, shy, and reserved man, began building a two-roomed cottage on the nursery land at Alloway in 1757, and courted a girl at Alloway Mill, apparently composing a letter proposing marriage but tore it up upon meeting, at the age of 36, Agnes Broun at a Maybole Fair in 1756. Agnes was a lively 24-year-old, 11 years his junior, a vivacious red-head with brown eyes. On 15 December 1757, he married Agnes, a farmer's daughter who hailed from Craigenton, in Kirkoswald parish, South Ayrshire. They would remain together for 26 years, until his death.

In February 1767 William Burnes, William Reid of Doonside Mill and a blacksmith named John Tennant got permission from the council to build a dry stone dyke around Alloway Kirk to prevent Elias Cathcart's cattle from straying into the then unenclosed churchyard; they did this at their own expense.

Robert was their first child, born on 25 January 1759, followed by Gilbert in 1760, Agnes in 1762, Annabella in 1764, William in 1767, John in 1769 and Isabella in 1771. By 1765, the Alloway cottage had become too small, and William Burnes approached Provost Fergusson with a view to leasing Mount Oliphant farm, then known as High Corton, two miles distant. Provost Fergusson allowed him a twelve-year lease, with the option of a break at six years, lending him £100 to buy stock. William had been in addition briefly employed by the council to collect information about residents for a census that they were holding.

Towards the end of the Mount Oliphant lease period Fergusson died and William fell behind in his rent. The exchanges over these arrears with the factor were alarming for William and the rest of the family, but the debts were settled amicably by the estate taking a mortgage on the Alloway cottage, leaving William free at the end of his lease in 1777 to move to Lochlea, South Ayrshire.

=== Litigation ===
It was a time of great agricultural improvements and for four years all went well, however, William then fell into arrears with his rent whilst farming and improving Lochlea, and his landlord, David McLure of Shawwood, put two legal petitions before the Sheriff of Ayrshire over alleged arrears of rent. McClure was himself in financial difficulties. William Burnes eventually won his appeal to the Court of Session on 27 January 1784, and paid the balance of the rent which had been set against his own expenses in liming, fencing, and erecting new buildings.

=== Death ===
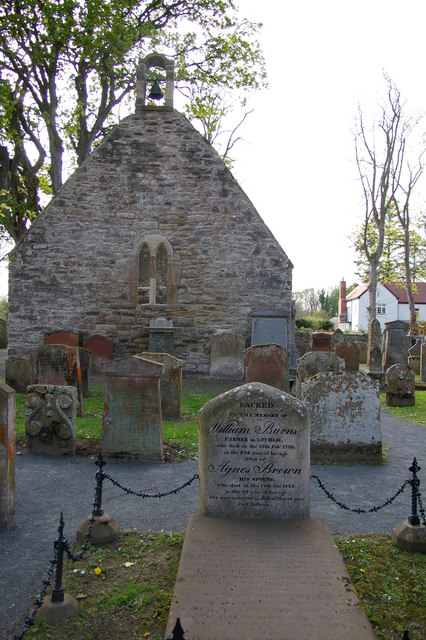
The kirk ruins and William Burnes's grave

Upon his deathbed at Lochlea Farm William said that he feared for the good conduct of one of his family. Upon enquiry he told Robert that he was referring to him, evoking silent tears of remorse. He died from "physical consumption" and exhaustion on 13 February 1784. William was buried in the abandoned Alloway Kirk which he had helped to preserve, despite dying in the parish of Tarbolton. His present headstone is the third, the previous two having been chipped away by souvenir hunters.

== Influence upon Robert Burns ==
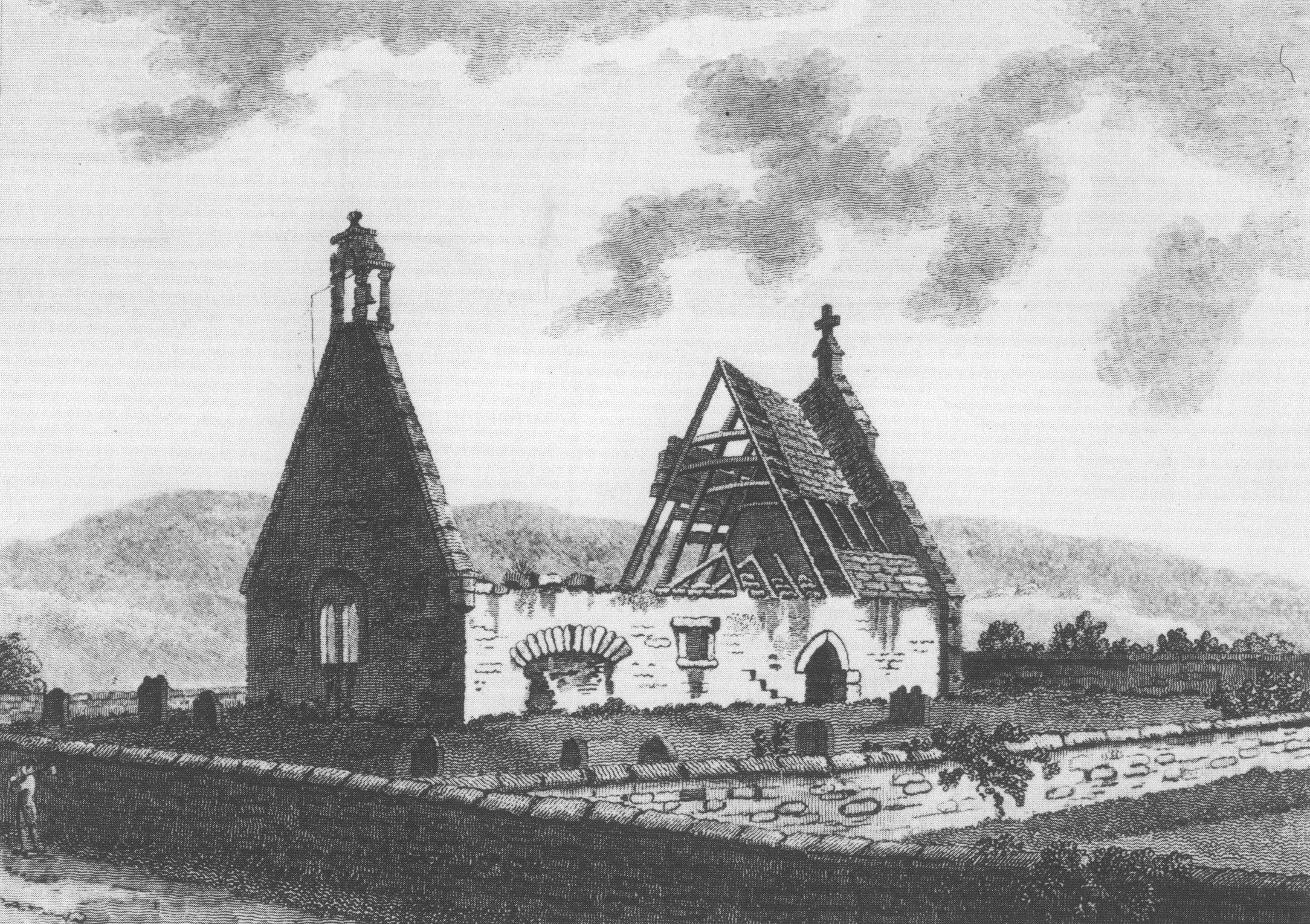
Alloway Auld Kirk at the time of Robert Burns, from The Antiquities of Scotland by Francis Grose.

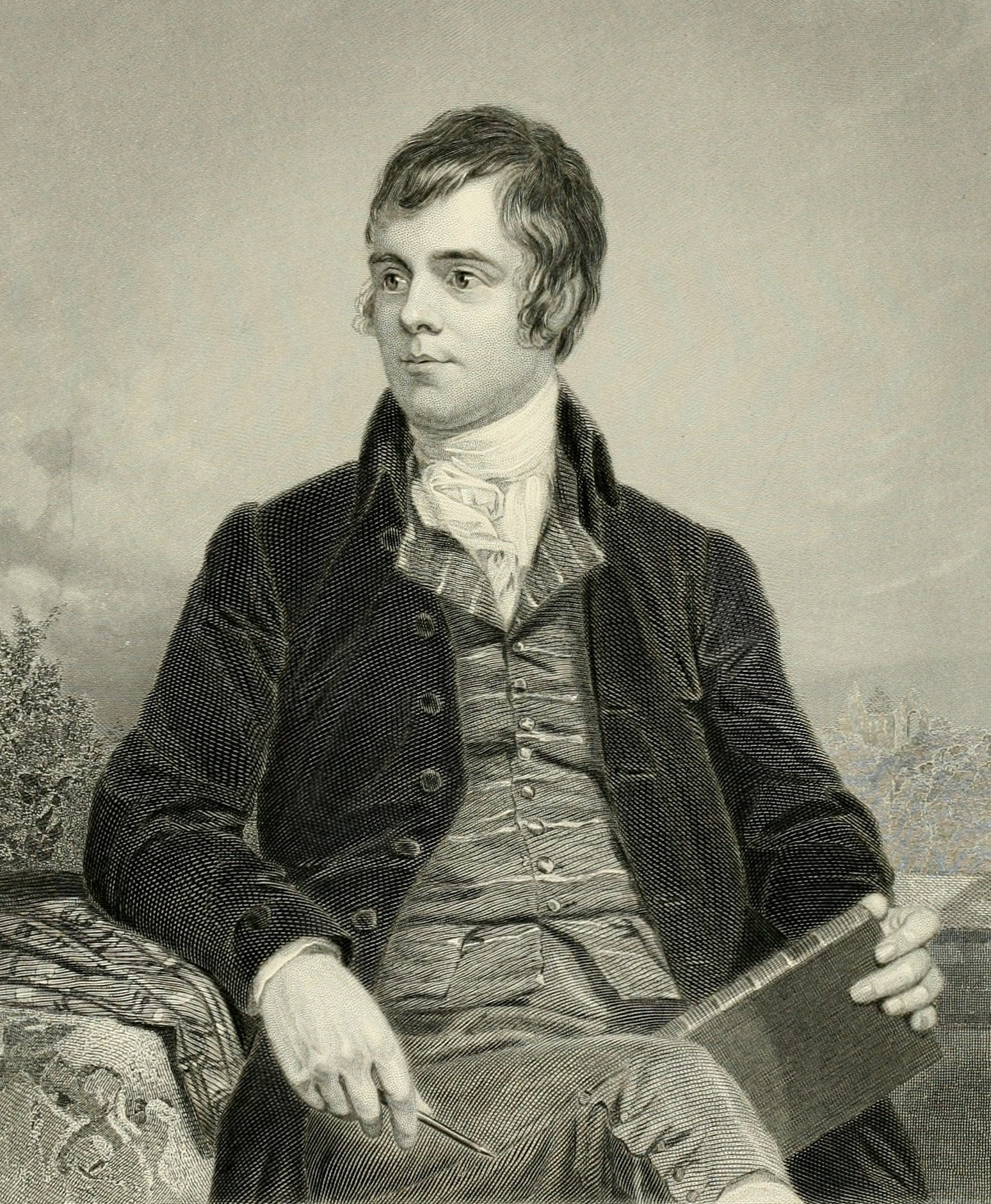
Robert Burns

William Burnes taught his children reading, writing, arithmetic, geography, and history. It is significant that he wrote A Manual of Religious Belief for the use of his children. William also paid for the tuition of Robert and Gilbert by John Murdoch (1747–1824), who opened an 'adventure school' in Alloway in 1763 and taught Latin, French, and mathematics from 1765 to 1768 until Murdoch left the area. Robert Burns had a few years of home education until William sent him to Dalrymple Parish School during the summer of 1772. In 1773 William sent Robert to stay with John Murdoch for three weeks to study grammar, French, and Latin.

John Murdoch spoke of William as 'the saint, the father, and the husband' and: "a tender and affectionate father of whose many qualities and rational and Christian virtues he would not pretend to give description ... In this mean cottage I really believe there dwelt a larger portion of content than in any palace in Europe."

Isobel Burns remembered her father as being cheerful, keen to make his children happy, approachable, affable, and fond of a joke, rarely given to anger.

William disliked the Tarbolton dancing class that Robert attended. The poet later wrote that "In my seventeenth year, to give my manners a brush, I went to a country dancing school. My father had an unaccountable antipathy against these meetings; and my going was, what to this hour I repent, in absolute defiance of his commands. My father, as I said before, was the sport of strong passions; from that instance of rebellion he took a kind of dislike to me..."

Robert Burns's later commented on his father, saying:

"…I myself have always considered William Burnes as by far the best of the human race that ever I had the pleasure of being acquainted with, and many a worthy character I have known. I can cheerfully join with Robert in the last line of his epitaph borrowed from Goldsmith – 'For even his failings leaned to virtue's side.' He was a tender and affectionate father; he took pleasure in leading his children in the path of virtue; not in driving them as some parents do, to the performance of duties to which they are averse. He took care to find fault but seldom, and, therefore, when he did rebuke he was listened to with a kind of reverential awe."

Robert Burns composed the following lines for William's headstone :

"O ye whose cheek the tear of pity stains,

Draw near with pious rev'rence, and attend!

Here lie the loving husband's dear remains,

The tender father, and the gen'rous friend.

The pitying heart that felt for human woe,

The dauntless heart that fear'd no human pride,

The friend of man – to vice alone a foe;

'For even his failings lean'd to virtue's side'."

The original grave was "carried away in chips" by visitors wanting a souvenir and a second was provided by Mr. David Auld of Doonbrae.

== See also ==
- Jean Armour
- Agnes Broun
- Isabella Burns
- Robert Burnes
- Elizabeth Paton
- Robert Burnes
