= Robert Burns Junior =

Son of the poet Robert Burns

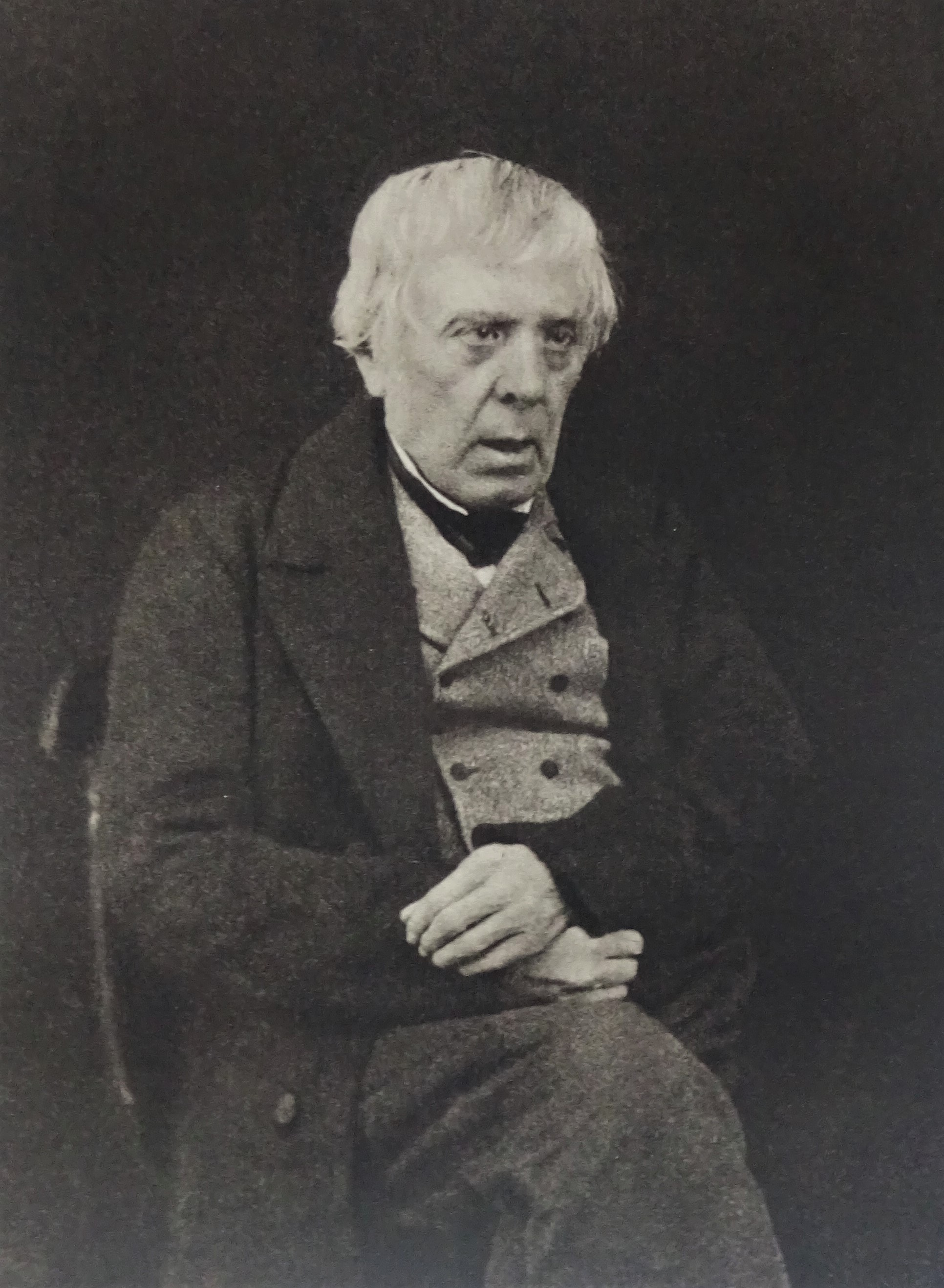
- Robert Burns Junior
- Born: 3 September 1786; Mauchline, East Ayrshire
- Died: 14 May 1857 (aged 70); Bank Street, Dumfries, Dumfriesshire, Scotland
- Occupation: Clerk at Somerset House
- Spouse(s): Anne Sherwood; Emma Bland
- Children: Elizabeth
- Parent(s): Robert Burns; Jean Armour

Robert Burns Junior or Robert Burns ll (1786–1857) was the first son and one of the first pair of twins born to the poet Robert Burns and his wife Jean Armour. He was born on the 3 September 1786 and baptised on 5 September. John Tennant of Glenconner was a witness at the baptism. His twin sister was Jean Burns, who died of unknown causes in infancy on 20 October 1787. His father, who often called him 'Bobbie', died when Robert Junior was only nine years old, at which point he was the eldest of a family of five legitimate male offspring.

== Life and family ==
Robert, as stated, was born on 3 September 1786 and died on 14 May 1857. Agnes Maclehose sent him a gift of 'twa sarkies' that his father acknowledged immediately "I have just now, My ever dearest Madam, delivered your kind present to my sweet, little Bobbie, who I find a very fine fellow". Robert and Jean were not formally married and Robert Junior was taken in by his family members at Mossgiel Farm, whilst Jean was taken in by the Armour family in Mauchline. He stayed on at Mossgiel even after his parents were formally married and remained there for a while after Robert and Jean moved to Ellisland Farm, returning, aged four, in the company of his grandmother and aunts at the time of Jean's confinement and the birth of Francis Wallace Burns on 18 September 1789.

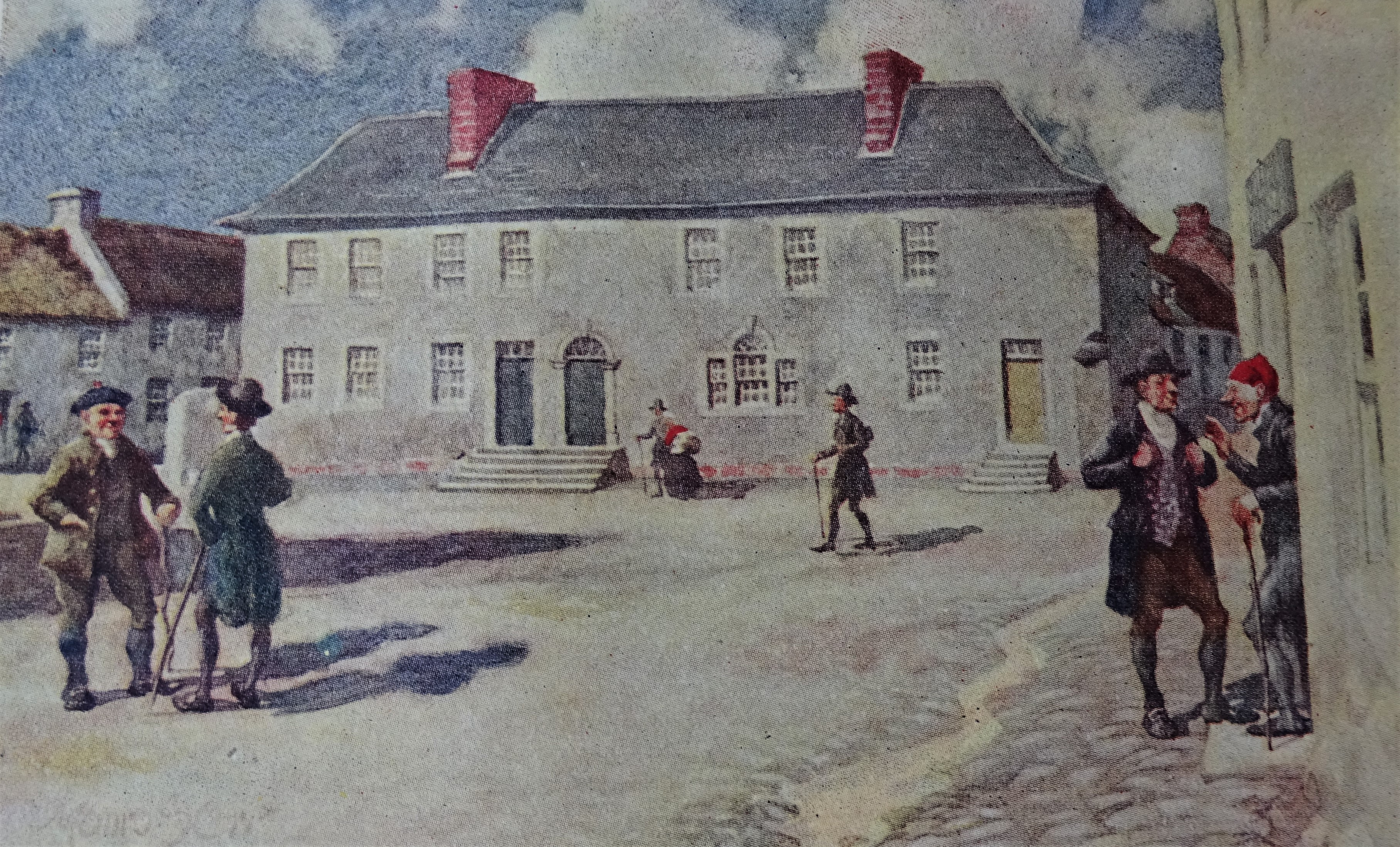
Mauchline in Robert Burns Junior's day

Robert's siblings were Jean (b. 3 March 1788); William Nicol (b. 9 April 1791); James Glencairn (b. 12 August 1794); Elizabeth Riddell (b. 21 November 1792); Francis Wallace (b. 1789) and Maxwell (b. 25 July 1796). Short lived un-named twin girls (b. 3 March 1788).[9]

Writing to Alexander Cunningham Burns stated "When I tell you that Mrs Burns was once, 'my Jean', you will know the rest. Of four children she bore me, in seventeen months, my eldest boy is only living. By the bye, I intend breeding him (Bobbie) up for the chuch; and from an innate dexterity in secret Mischief which he posses (sic), & a certain hypocritical gravity as he looks on the consequences. I have no small hopes of him in the sacerdotal line."

At age six Robert Junior was said to "have his father's alert, lively mind, combined with a certain docility and gravity, and Burns had high hopes that the boy might go far, if he were given the right education." Speaking to Anna Benson at Arbigland, Burns commented that Bobbie was a promising boy and yet he sarcastically said that "I hope he will turn out a glorious blockhead, and so make his fortune".

In his poem Nature's Law, Robert indicated his optimistic aspirations for his eldest son:

Auld cantie Coil may count the day,
As annual it returns,
The third of Libra's equal sway,
That gave another Burns,
With future rhymes an' other times,
To emulate his sire
To sing auld Coil in nobler style,
With more poetic fire.

Robert Junior had a superior memory, was a proficient musician, had a good singing voice and did try his hand at writing English verse, however his efforts lacked the ability, the genius and the fire of his father.

Writing to Mrs Frances Dunlop from Dumfries on 24 September 1792, Burns said, revealing his early pride in Robert Junior: "Your little godson (Francis Wallace) is thriving charmingly, but is a very devil. He, though two years younger, has completely mastered his brother. Robert is indeed the mildest, gentlest creature I ever saw. He has a most surprising memory, and is quite the pride of his schoolmaster."

Robert Junior left an account of life in Mill Street, saying that the family always had a maid, often had company and the house was carpeted and well furnished. He remarked that "besides the spoils of smugglers, the poet received many presents of game and country produce from the rural gentlefolk, besides occasional barrels of oysters ..."

=== Marriage and retirement ===
Aged 22, Robert Burns Junior married Anne Sherwood on 24 March 1809 at St Marylebone Parish Church. The couple had a daughter, Eliza. Her uncle James Glencairn Burns took her to India, where she married Dr Bartholomew Everitt of the East India Company at Bangalore and had a daughter, Martha Burns Everitt. They returned from India in 1839 and her husband died a year later. Anne died aged 55 at Bath in 1878.

Robert separated from Anne Sherwood Burns circa 1820 and lived with a common-law wife, Emma Bland, the couple having four children: Jessie (b.1827), Frances (b.1829), Jane Emma (b.1831) and Robert Burns III (b.1833) in London and Dumfries. Emma was the daughter of a London innkeeper of Palace Yard, Westminster and after Robert Junior's death she is thought to have returned to London. Robert and Emma lived in English Street in Dumfries where Emma ran a lodging house.

Robert was very interested in Gaelic and spent quite some time and effort studying it.

Robert Junior dismissed Allan Cunningham's account of his father's death saying that "... the poet was too much crippled by disease, and too much enfeebled, for such a strange exertion. He lay a helpless wreck, his mind wandering in delirium. His last words were 'That rascal, Matthew Penn' an incoherent ejaculation, prompted probably by some dread of the law and jail, for Matthew Penn was an attorney, and the poet was a few pounds in debt".

=== Education and career ===
Robert, like his brothers James Glencairn and William Nicol, was educated at Dumfries Grammar School, thanks in his case to financial assistance from Alexander John Riddell, brother of Robert Riddell of Friars Carse. Aged 16 in 1802 he was able to enrol and study logic and rhetoric for two years at Glasgow University under Professor George Jardin thanks to funds from the Duchess Anne Mortification, winning the Classics Medal. He next, in 1804, studied moral philosophy for a session at Edinburgh under James Mylne, but did not graduate.

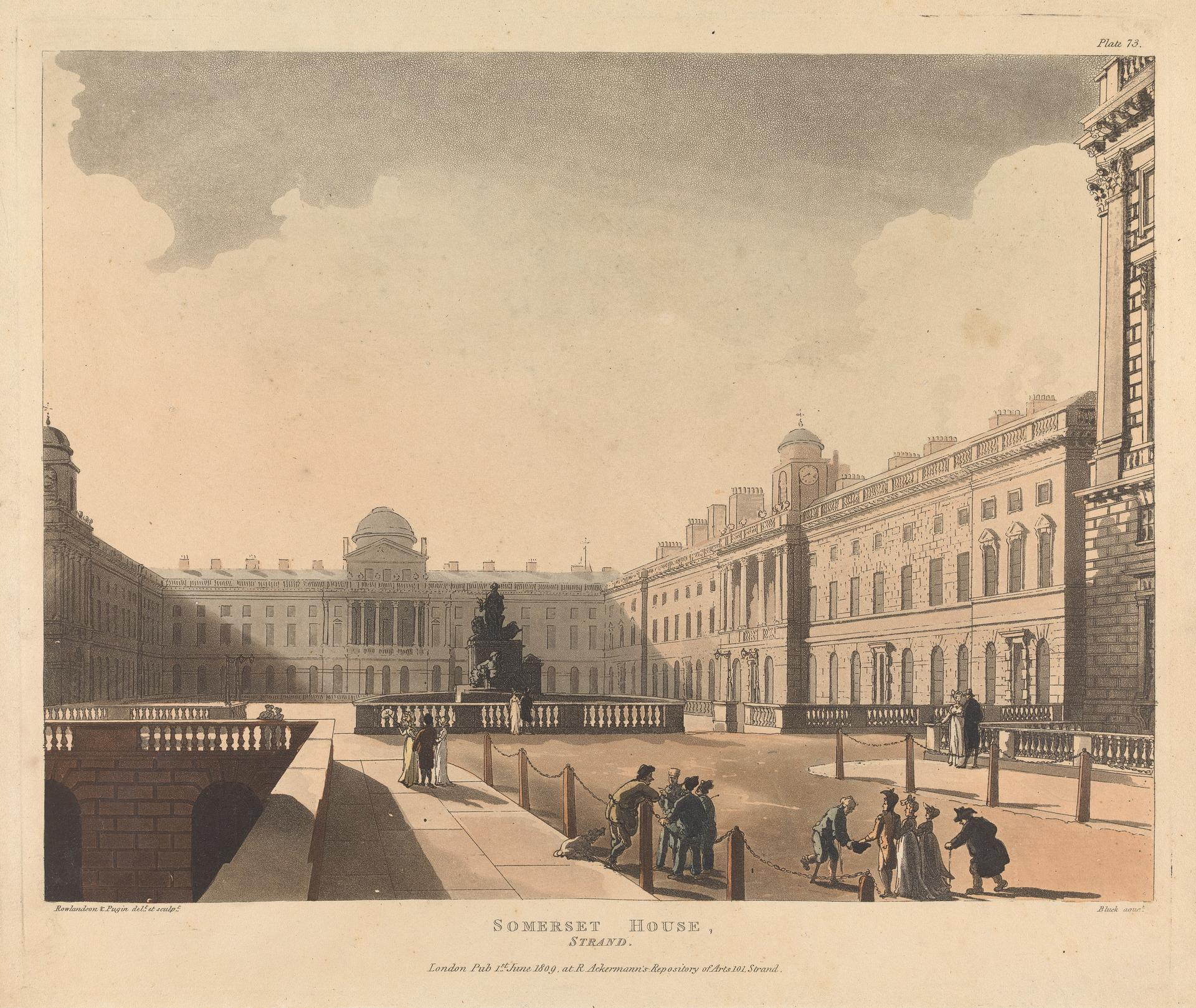
Somerset House in the Strand, 1809, London.

The Prime Minister was induced to offer him a position in the Stamp Office in the Strand, London, then part of the Treasury, where he worked for twenty-seven years without receiving any promotion. Robert retired in 1833 aged only forty-six and moved to live in Dumfries on a small pension, where he died in 1857. Dated 16 August 1832, a letter from the Treasury Chambers was printed in the 1859 Illustrated London News, showing that because of "the great literary talents" of his father, the Commissioners of Stamps at Somerset House placed him on the superannuation list at the allowance of £120 per annum'.

Robert was less than grateful for Sir James Shaw's help in advising Henry Addington, the Prime Minister, to appoint him to the Stamp Office. This was revealed in a letter to Dr. Maxwell, his father's physician, where he stated that "Indeed I cannot help being indignant at being set at his table to be gazed at by a set of worshipping sycophants as his protege, dependant upon his bounty; and having my ears eternally tortured with oblique insinuations of the great obligations I owe him." Shaw was a nephew of Robert's uncle, Gilbert Burns, through his wife Jean Breckenridge.

Robert added to his income by teaching mathematics and classics whilst living in London and in Dumfries.

Robert Junior fell into debt and was advised to retire early because of his marital situation and because of his repeated gambling debts. His mother used the repaid loan of £220 7s 6d that her husband had originally made to Gilbert to pay off Robert Junior's outstanding gambling debts, so that he would not be jailed as well as losing his job with no pension. Robert Junior, however, was not 'cured' of his addiction and by 20 July 1832 his superiors became aware of the situation and he was prematurely retired. Gilbert had written to Jean Armour Burns's lawyer in 1820, saying, "Mrs Burns informed me some time ago that her son Robert had been very imprudently engaged in some speculations (the nature of which I am not informed of) which had brought him into embarrassed circumstances, and that she had from time to time sent him supplies of money as she could spare."

It seems, as hinted to in his obituary in the Dumfries Courier, that Robert Junior was never suited to the work of a public office and a life in academia would have been better suited to his temperament.

In 1845 Robert, a keen Freemason, became Master of Dumfries Kilwinning Lodge. Robert was the last member of the family to be buried in the Burns Mausoleum in St Michael's churchyard, Dumfries.

== Memorial events ==
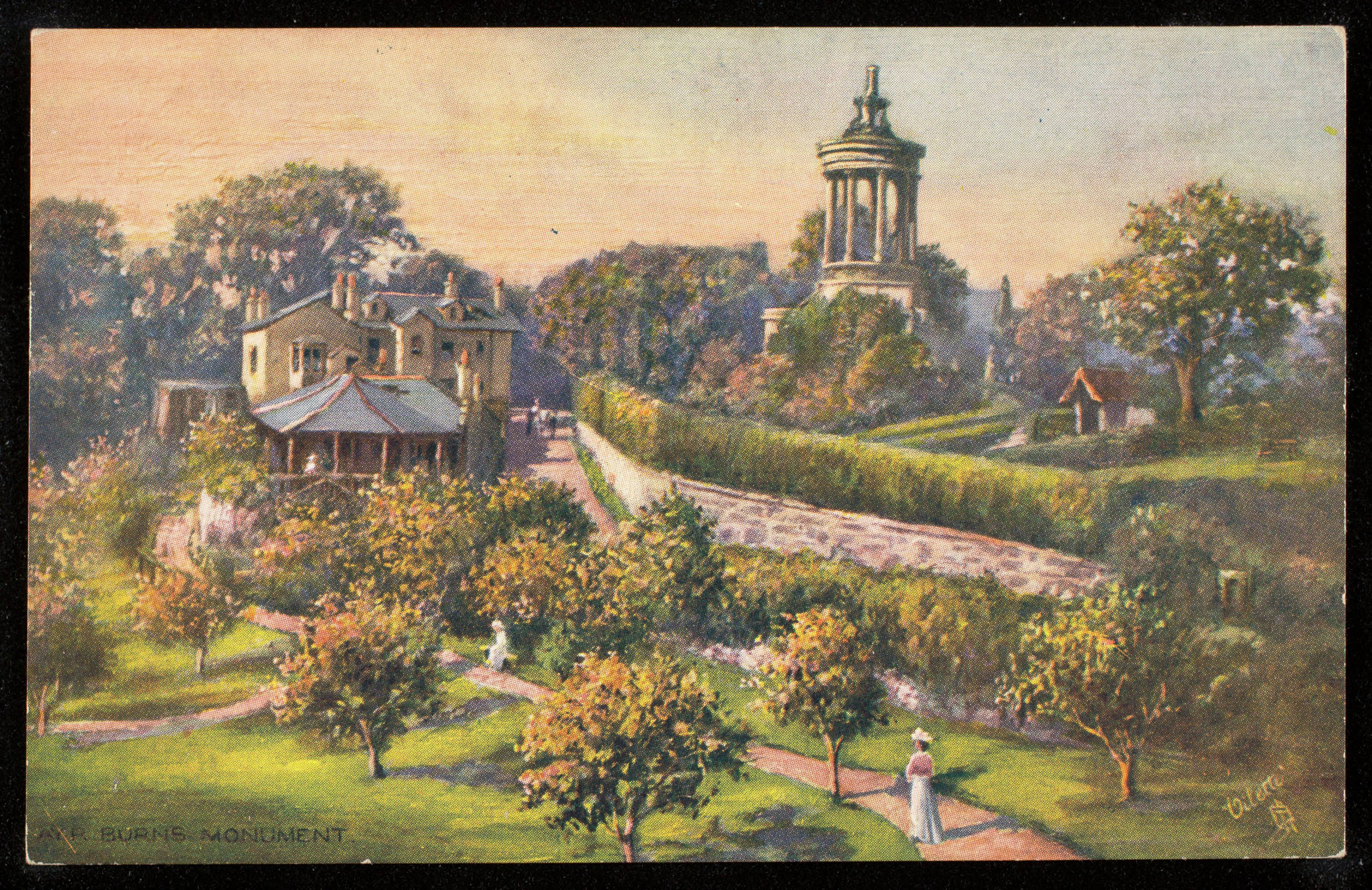
Burns Memorial, Alloway in 1903.

On 6 August 1844, a "Burns Festival" attended by around 80,000 people took place at Ayr and the Burns Monument at Alloway; with William Nicol, James Glencairn and Robert Burns Junior in attendance, the three surviving sons of the poet, together with their aunt Isabella Burns. They sadly refused to meet Robert, their nephew, their father's natural grandson by Elizabeth "Betty" Burns, at the festival.

"Betty" Burns herself was also excluded from the 1844 festival and, as stated, her son Robert Thomson was rejected upon trying to greet his father's sons, his uncles, at the Ayr Festival.

Robert Burns Junior, together with his brothers William Nicol and James Glencairn, was made an Honorary Member of the Lodge St James on 9 August 1844 at a meeting held in the old Cross Keys Inn at Tarbolton.

== See also ==
- Agnes Burns (aunt)
- Annabella Burns (aunt)
- Isabella Burns (aunt)
- John Burns (uncle)
- Gilbert Burns (uncle)
- William Burns (uncle)
- Francis Wallace Burns (brother)
- Elizabeth Riddell Burns (sister)
- James Glencairn Burns (brother)
- William Nicol Burns (brother)
