= Francis Wallace Burns =

Son of the poet Robert Burns

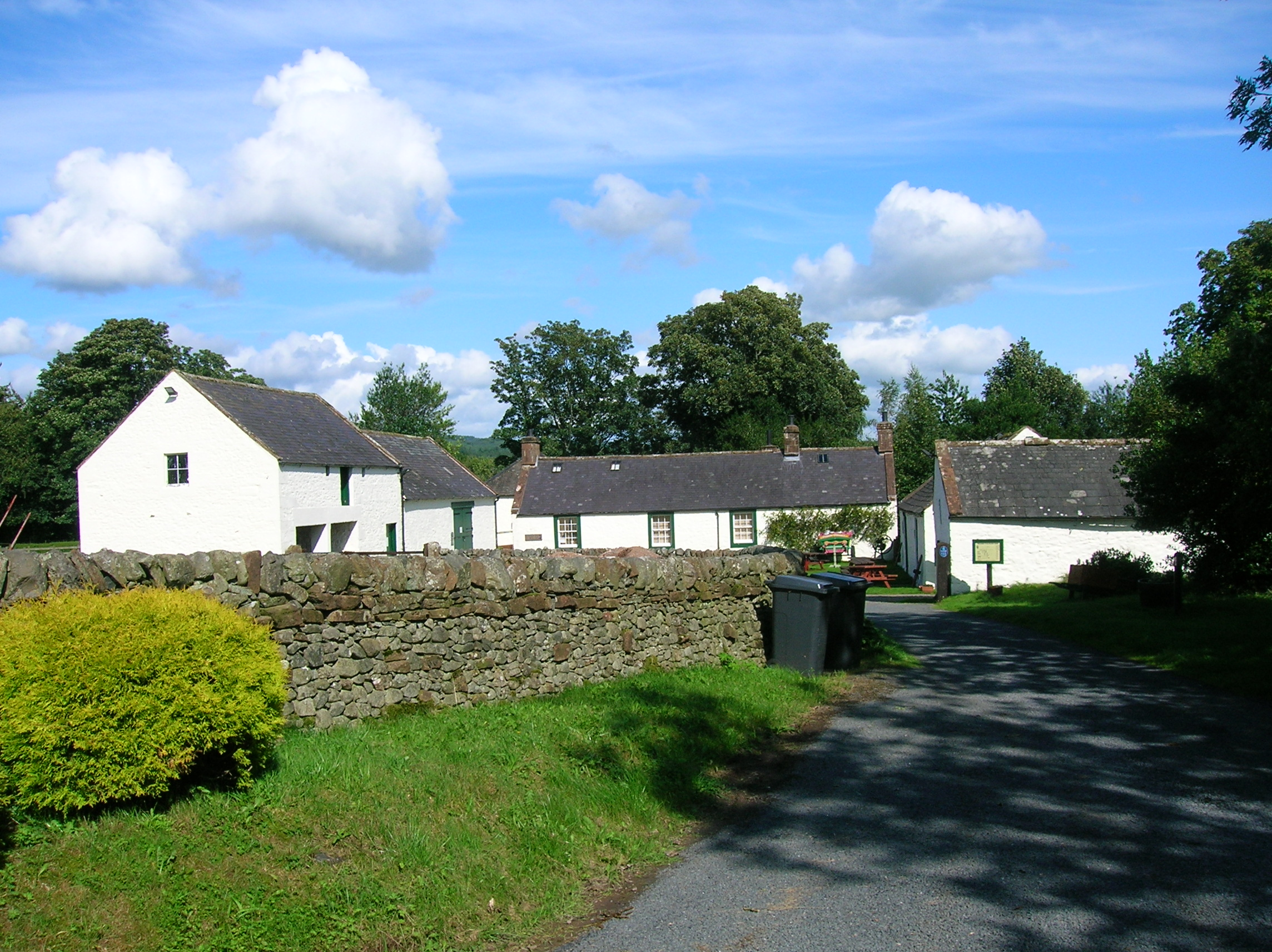
- Francis Burns's birthplace, Ellisland Farm
- Born: 18 August 1789; Ellisland Farm, Nithsdale
- Died: 9 July 1803 (aged 13); Dumfries
- Parent(s): Robert Burns; Jean Armour

Francis Wallace Burns (1789–1803) was the second son of the poet Robert Burns, born when the poet was 30 and his wife Jean Armour was 24. Francis was born at Ellisland Farm in Dunscore parish, Nithsdale on the 18 August 1789. His first and middle names were added in honour of Frances Dunlop of Dunlop, Robert's friend, patron and mentor. Her maiden name was Frances Anna Wallace and what is known of his early life comes from the many letters to Frances in which he was mentioned. His father died in 1796 and little is known of Francis's short life after this date.

== Life and background ==
Born at Ellisland Farm at 6.45am on 18 September 1789, as recorded in the family register in the Burns family Bible. Francis and the family moved to the Wee Vennel in Dumfries on 11 November 1791. In late spring 1793 the family made the move to a larger house in Millhole Brae, now Burns Street.

Francis's siblings were Robert Burns Junior (b. 3 March 1788); Jean (b. 3 March 1788); William Nicol (b. 9 April 1791); Elizabeth Riddell (b. 21 November 1792); James Glencairn (b. 12 August 1794) and Maxwell (b. 25 July 1796). Short lived un-named twin girls (b. 3 March 1788).

After his father's death Francis and his three brothers, Robert, William and Maxwell, were cared for by a close family friend and sister of John Lewars, Robert Burns's excise colleague. Her name was Jessie Lewars and she had also previously nursed the boys' father in his final days.

=== Correspondence ===
His father Robert often referred to him as 'Frank' in his letters and it seems from the frequent reference in his letters to her Godson, that Frances Dunlop had agreed to be Francis's Godmother. Writing 21 February 1789 to Frances Dunlop he announced "I hope to be a father again in about two or three months, and I had resolved and indeed had told Mrs Burns, that the child should be christened by the name of Frances Dunlop, if a girl, or Francis Dunlop etc, if a boy ..." Robert went on consider that if Frances preferred one of her gender then "I have not the smallest doubt of being very soon able to accommodate you in that way to". On 22 June 1789 Burns informed Frances Dunlop that "Your little dear namesake has not yet made his appearance, but he is every day expected. I promise myself great assistance in training up his young mind to dignity of sentiment and greatness of soul, from the honored name by which he is called."

Frances Anna Dunlop, nee Wallace. Francis Wallace's namesake

In a letter to his brother William, written four days before the birth of Francis, it appears that Robert's sisters, Annabella, Isabella and Agnes together with their mother, were present at Jean's confinement.

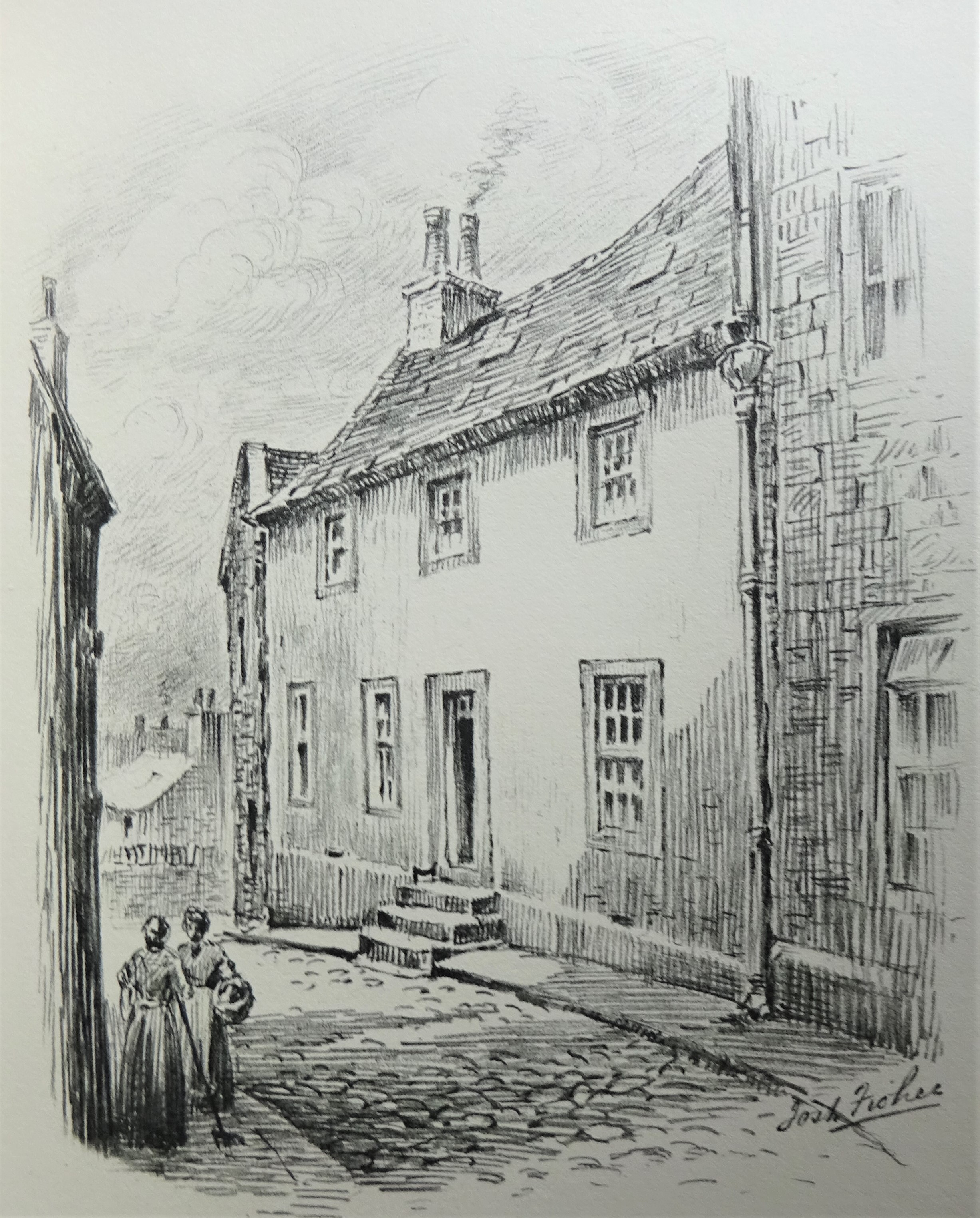
Burns House in Millhole Brae (Burns Street) where Francis died in 1803.

Robert reported to Frances the day after Francis's birth that "About two hours ago I welcomed home your little Godson". "He is a fine squalling fellow with a pipe that makes the room ring".

Burns wrote from Ellisland Farm telling Frances Dunlop of the birth of Francis: "... who, by the bye, I trust will be of no discredit to the honorable name of Wallace, as he has a fine manly countenance, and a figure that might do credit to a little fellow two months older; and likewise an excellent good temper, though when he pleases he has a pipe, only not quite so loud as the horn that his immortal namesake blew as a signal to take out the pin of Stirling bridge." Sir William Wallace was an ancestor of Frances Dunlop and Robert was making a reference to the Battle of Stirling Bridge that took place in September 1297.

Another report to Frances was that he was intending to have her Godson Francis inoculated as a lot of small-pox was about "... in the country and I tremble for his fate". He went on to say that "Every person who sees him acknowledges him to be the finest, handsomest child they have ever seen. I am myself delighted with the manly swell of his little chest, and a certain miniature dignity in the carriage of his head and the glance of his fine black eye, which promises the undaunted gallantry of an Independent Mind".

Robert mentioned on 10 February 1790 to Willam Burns "Poor little Frank is this morning at the height in the smallpox. I got him inoculated, and I hope he is in a good way." In March 1790 Robert wrote that "Your little Godson is quite recovered, & is if possible, more thriving than ever; but alas! one of the Servants has introduced the measles into the house, & I shall be very uneasy until we get them over."

Writing from Ellisland Farm on 7 February 1791 Robert reported that "As to the little fellow, he is, partiality apart, the finest boy I have of a long time seen. He is now seventeen months old, has the small-pox and measles over, has cut several teeth, and yet never had a grain of Doctor's drugs in his bowels".

William Nicol Burns was born on April 9, 1791, and Robert informed Frances that his new son was "a fine boy, rather stouter but not so handsome as your God-son at his time of life was. Indeed I look on your little Namesake to be my chief d'oeuvre in that species of manufacture, as I look on "Tam o' Shanter" to be my standard performance in the Poetical line".

Francis was a good scholar. Writing in September 1792 Burns said ".. your little Godson is thriving charmingly, but is a very devil. He though two years younger, has completely mastered his brother. He has a surprising memory, & is quite the pride of his school-master".

==== Career ====
James Shaw, when Sheriff of London, arranged for Francis to become a cadet in India in the spring of 1804 with the military service of the Honourable East India Company, however he died before he could take up the place. A rare letter written by his mother in 1804, probably to Maria Riddell, was found by chance in New York in 2009 that records this assistance from James Shaw who was a relative of Robert Burns.

=== Death ===
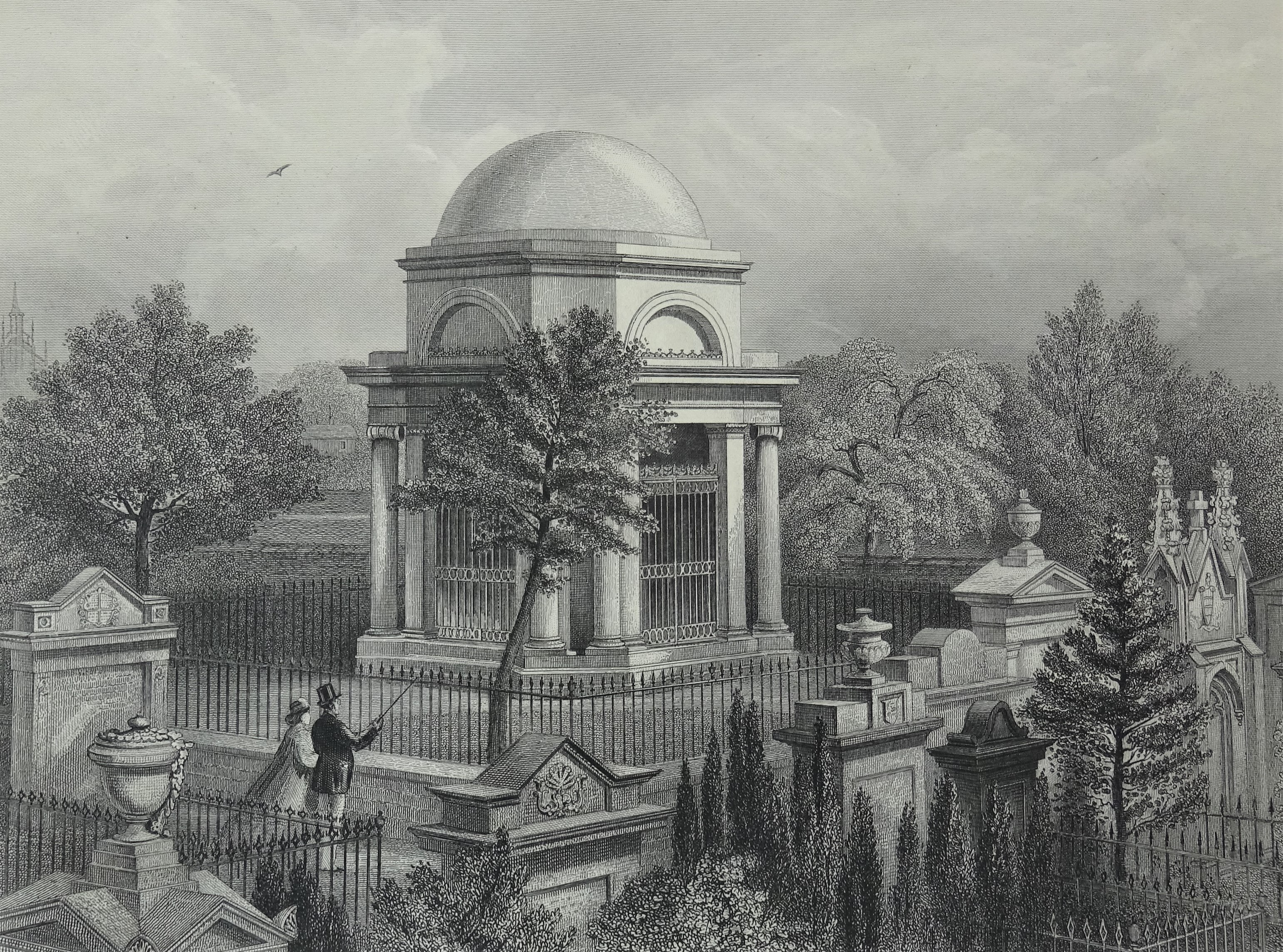
The Burns Mausoleum where Francis was interred in 1815

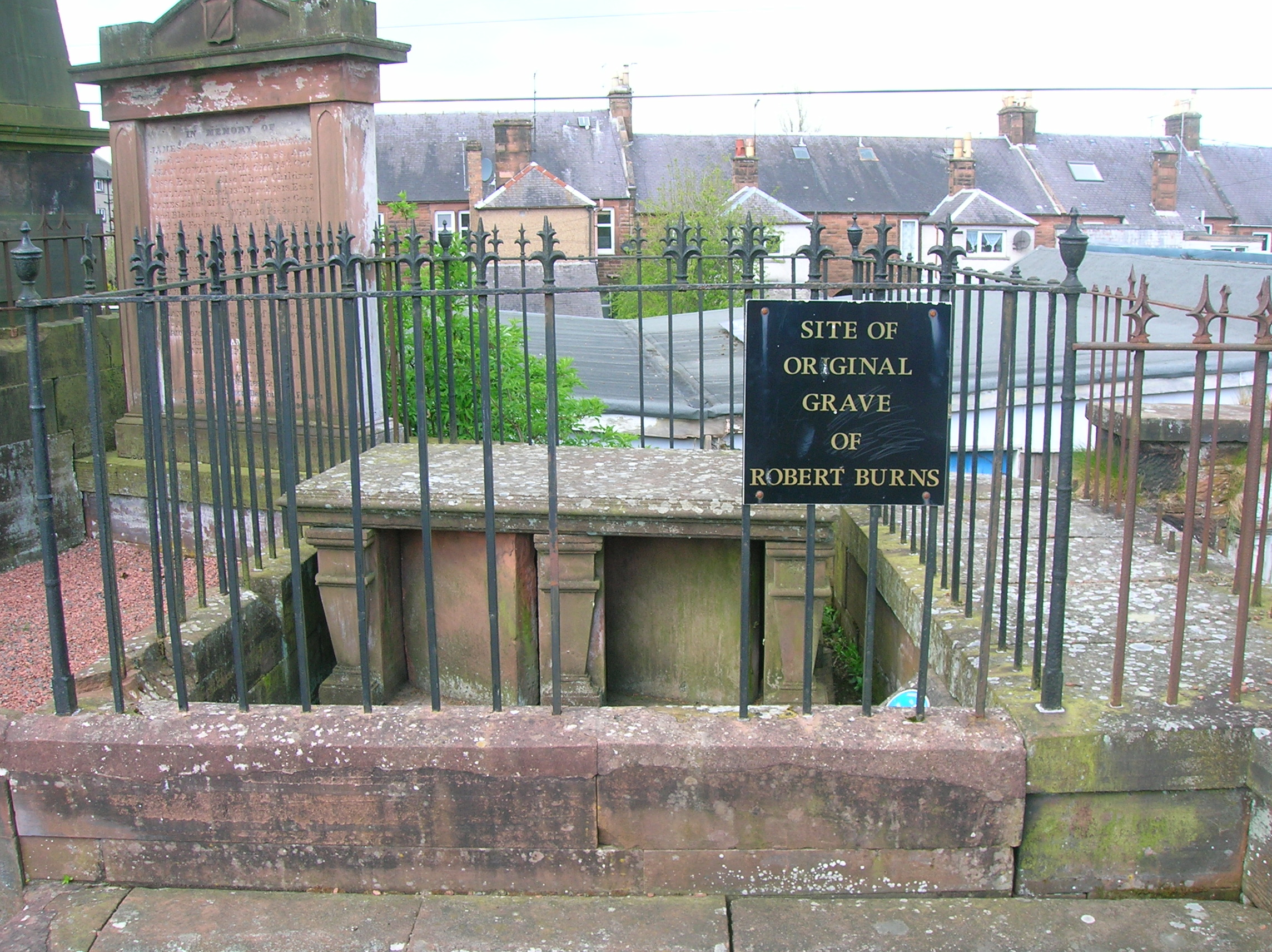
Francis Wallace Burns's first burial site.

Francis was only thirteen when he died of an unrecorded illness in the family home at Millhole Brae (Burns Street) in Dumfries on 9 July 1803. He was first buried in the family lair, next to his father, in the north-east corner of the churchyard of St Michael's Kirk, Dumfries. Francis was re-interred together with his father and his brother Maxwell in the vault of the newly erected mausoleum on 19 September 1815.

In 1803, an account for the coffins of Robert Burns, Maxwell and Francis Wallace was presented to the Trustees of Robert Burns by Thomas Boyd, coffin maker. Robert had died seven years previously in 1796. Francis Wallace's death may have prompted the issue of the account, the coffin manufacturers possibly having deferred the payment out of appreciation of the financial difficulties Jean Armour Burns was facing at the time of Robert Burns's death and sympathy for her family situation. Francis's coffin cost five pounds and five shillings on 11 July 1803, possibly his burial date.

== See also ==
- Agnes Burns (aunt)
- Annabella Burns (aunt)
- Isabella Burns (aunt)
- John Burns (uncle)
- Gilbert Burns (uncle)
- William Burns (uncle)
- James Glencairn Burns (brother)
- Dr William Maxwell
