= William Burns (saddler) =

Unmarried second youngest brother of the poet Robert Burns

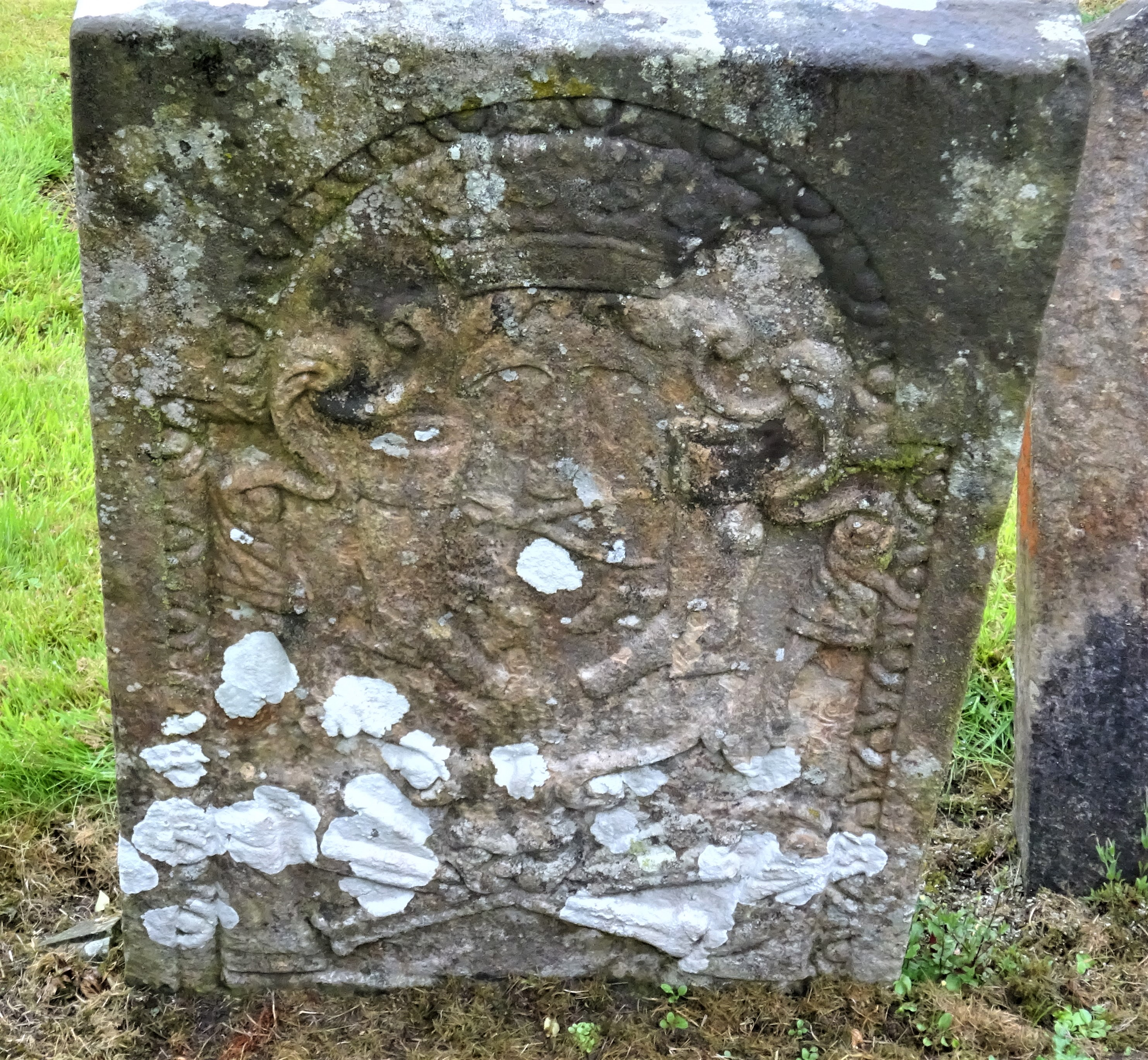
- A gravestone with a half-moon-shaped leather workers knife
- Born: 31 July 1767; Mount Oliphant, Alloway
- Died: 24 July 1790 (aged 22); London
- Occupation: Saddler
- Spouse: Unmarried
- Children: None
- Parent(s): William Burnes; Agnes Broun

William Burns (1767–1790) was the second youngest brother of the poet Robert Burns and the third son born to William Burness and Agnes Broun. William was born at Mount Oliphant Farm on the Doonholm Estate near Alloway, about three miles from Ayr, on the 12 July 1769. He was christened circa 6 August 1767 by the Rev. Rev William Dalrymple of Ayr parish and kirk.

== Life and background ==
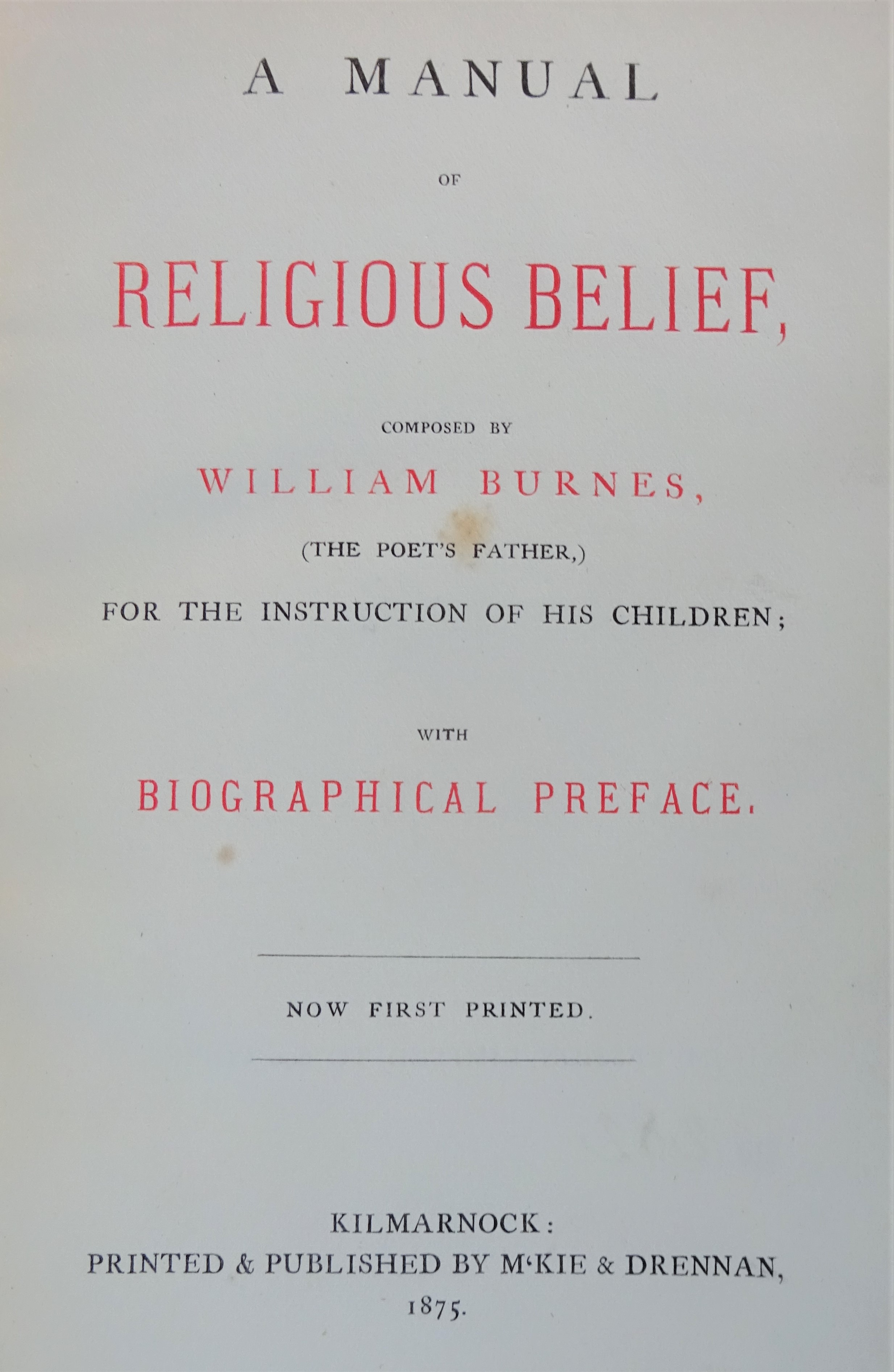
The Manual of Religious Belief.

His siblings were Robert (b. 25 January 1759); Gilbert (b. 28 September 1760); Agnes (b. 30 September 1762); Annabella (b. 14 November 1764); John (b. 12 July 1769); Isabella (b. 27 July 1771).

The family moved from Mount Oliphant Farm to Lochlea Farm near Alloway in 1777 and then moved to Mossgiel Farm near Mauchline in 1784, after William's father William Burnes had died. At Mossgiel Farm William would have worked as a labourer like his brothers and here he shared a tiny room in the loft with his younger brother John.

William was "intelligent and personable, but gentle and diffident" and had qualities that Robert Burns felt that he saw in himself.

Writing to Dr James Currie on 23 June 1802 John Murdoch, William's old teacher, gave details of his visit with William, writing that "... he repeated a lesson of morality I had given him about twenty years before that, when he was a mere child. To that lesson he declared himself indebted for almost all the philanthropy he possessed. Let not parents and teachers imagine that it is needless to talk seriously to children"

Helen or Nelly Millar of Grassmilees Farm, lying to the east of Mauchline, recollected that she had been William's lass but after they had been a "bit cast out" and had never "southered up" and she instead married a Mr Martin and went to great efforts to ensure that William attended and she had a dance with him. William had worked with Mr Waddel, a sadler as an apprentice and later with a Mr Rodger in Kilmarnock.

For several months, aged 18, William lived with his brother and family during Robert's first winter at Ellisland Farm. Robert's friend Robert Ainslie had failed to find an apprenticeship as a saddler in Edinburgh, much to Robert's disappointment, and William was having no success finding work locally.

William was, after a few months, finally apprenticed to a saddler in Longtown, Cumbria, he then moved to Newcastle-upon-Tyne, where he worked for the saddlers Messrs Walker and Robson in Middle Street. Now qualified, William found a temporary job in London as journeyman saddler with William T. Barber, at 181 the Strand, travelling there by ship from Newcastle. Anyone who wanted to work in the saddler trade had to serve an apprenticeship, sometimes starting as early as 13. Such apprentices would work long hours and learned how to master the special knives, including the classic half-moon-shaped round knife. and other equipment required to make and repair saddles, harnesses, bridles, etc. A 'Journeyman or Jorman' was a master craftsman who had served his apprenticeship.

=== Death ===
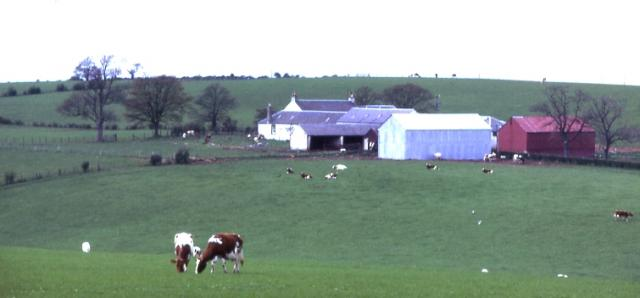
Lochlea Farm

William was only twenty-two when he died after a few days illness in London, from a 'putrid fever' on 24 July 1790. This term was often applied to typhus, transmitted by lice and common in London in the 18th century, the symptoms of which are red spots over the arms, back, and chest; attention deficit, progressing to delirium; and gangrenous sores and the associated smell of putrid or rotting flesh.

Unfortunately his exact grave site has been lost, although he was first buried in the churchyard of St Marys-le-Strand. Following building development works he was re-interred in the Necropolis Cemetery in Woking. Robert Burns paid for all of the bills incurred through his brother's funeral and illness, the receipt is dated 8 October 1790.

John Murdoch, the Burns family's old teacher, first visited William in London on 12 July 1790, when he was working there as a journeyman sadler. Shortly after his visit and before he could make a second, William died. On 14 September Murdoch wrote a long letter to Robert recording that, on receiving his letter of 16 July, which he finally received: "on the 26th in the afternoon per favour of my friend Mr Kennedy, and at the same time was informed that your brother was ill. Being engaged in business till late that evening, I set out next morning to see him, and had three or four medical gentlemen of my acquaintance, to one or other of whom I might apply for advice, provided it should be necessary. But when I went to Mr Barber's, to my great astonishment and heartfelt grief, I found that my young friend had, on Saturday, bid an everlasting farewell to all sublunary things". Sublunary means something belonging to this world as against a better or more spiritual one.

Murdoch helped with the funeral arrangements, attended it as the principal mourner and sent Robert details of this sad occasion.

== Association with Robert Burns ==
William was Robert's second youngest brother, John being the youngest. Robert was only eight years older than William and the relationship with his sibling was "affectionate, loyal, serious, never over-bearing or dictatorial, and always frank in his counsel. Robert however treated William as he might have treated one of his sons had he lived long enough to see him in the years of his young manhood."

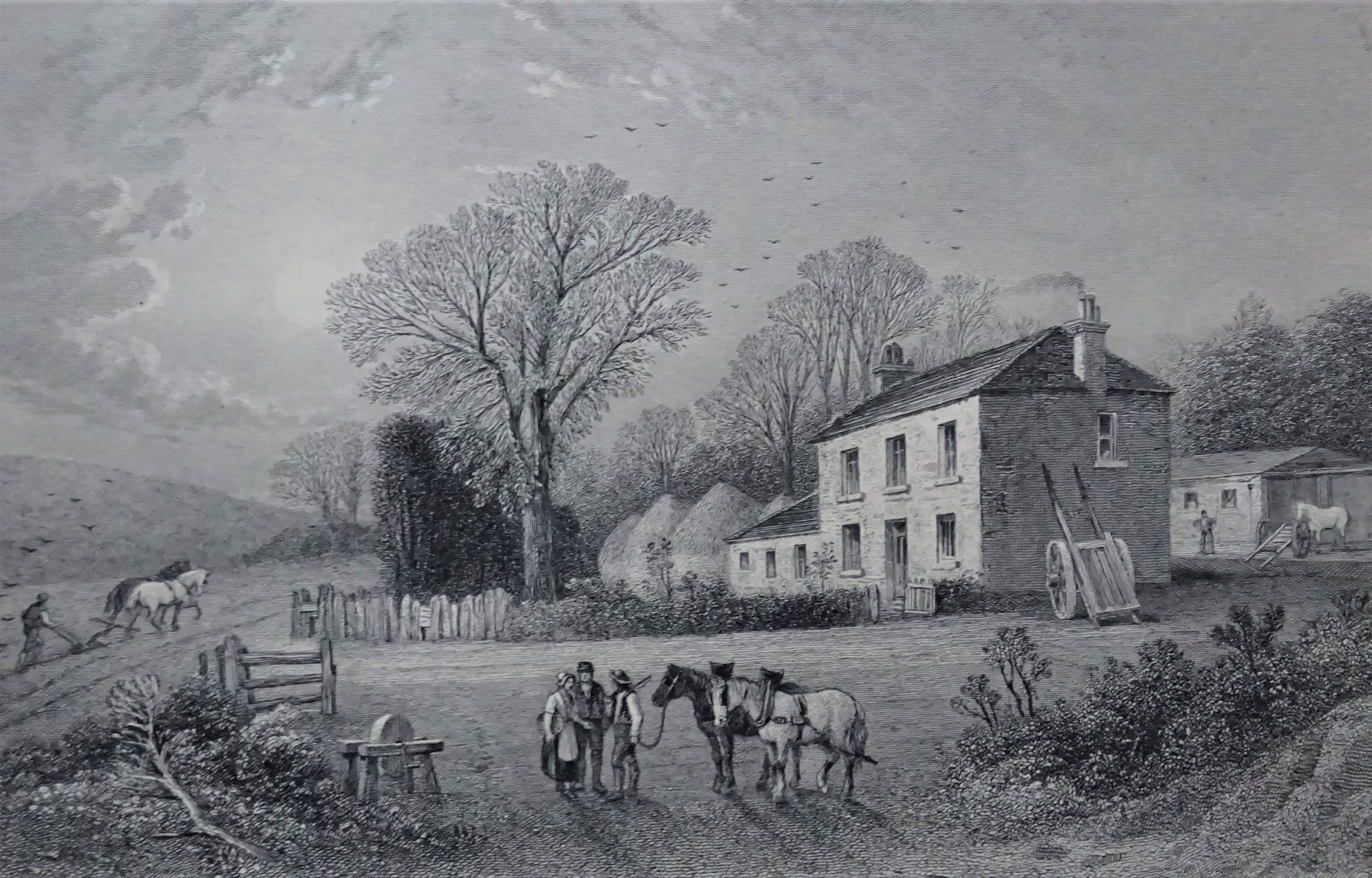
A much altered Mossgiel Farm in 1878

William and his siblings religious education was partly taught at home by their father, using the A Manual of Religious Belief that William Burnes had written for that purpose, assisted by John Murdoch.

Whilst at Mount Oliphant or Lochlea Farm Robert wrote a story, The Marriage of Robin Redbreast and the Wren, for his young siblings. William's youngest sister Isabella remembered this story and told it to Dr Chambers in 1850/51. The story was published in Chambers's Nursery Rhymes of Scotland.

Writing to Gilbert Burns in 1787 about his highland tour Robert stated that "I have been trying for a birth (sic) for William, but am not likely to be successful."

In February 1787 wrote to Agnes Maclehose and reported that he had spent the evening with William and Richard Brown in Glasgow. A plaque on the Marks & Spencer's department store in Argyle Street records that George Durie's Black Bull Inn once stood on the site and this was where they probably would have stayed the night. The Black Bull Inn was where the Edinburgh stagecoach terminated, Robert having travelled on it, Richard meeting him there and William no doubt travelling up on Jenny Geddes, Robert's horse.

Robert made it clear to William whilst he was searching for an apprenticeship that he would always have a home with his brother's family and 'filial' support. His letters go so far as to relate details of items of clothing that were sent to him by Robert.

== Correspondence ==
Ten letters from Robert to William between 2 March 1789 and 16 July 1790 survive. A number of William's letters to Robert survive also and they show William's lack of self-confidence and his reliance on Robert for sound advice. William in 1789 whilst at Longtown, wrote to Robert: "As I am now in a manner only entering the world, I begin this our correspondence with a view of being a gainer by your advice ... I know not how it happened, but you were more shy of your counsel than I could have wished, the time I stayed with you: whether it was because you thought it would disgust me to have my faults freely told while I was dependent on you, or whether it was because you saw that, by my indolent disposition, your instructions would have no effect, I cannot determine ..."

In another letter to Robert, William wrote regarding his move to London: "I have hitherto withstood the temptation to those vices to which young fellows of my station and time of life are so much addicted, yet I do not know if my virtue will be able to withstand the more powerful temptations of the metropolis; yet, through God's assistance and your instructions, I hope to weather the storm".

Once working in London, William wrote "There are swarms of fresh hands just come over from the country that the town is quite overstocked, and except one is a particularly good workman (which you know I am not, nor, I am afraid, ever will be) it will be hard to get a place". He asked if Gilbert could spare him an Ayrhire Cheese and if one of his sister's could alter and send on one of his best linen shirts.

On 5 may 1789 Robert gave the advice, whilst William was in Newcastle, "On Reason build Resolve, That column of true majesty in man." On 14 August 1789 Robert sent William a Bank of Scotland two guinea note, commenting that he could spare it only with some difficulty. Again he sent advice "On Reason build Resolve, That column of true majesty in Man; What proves the Hero truly great; Is never, never to despair". On 10 November 1789 Robert started by chastising William for a nearly three month gap between his letters even though "... you have spare hours in which you have nothing to do at all." He gives news of the family, expresses pleasure that William intends living within his means and finishes with an observation and more advice "You are at the time of life when those habitudes are begun which are to mark the character of the future Man. Go on, and persevere; and depend on less or more success". On 10 February 1790 Robert wrote to William as he was leaving Newcastle for London, giving him advice on city life, something he had not personally experienced. He again offers William financial support should he need it and ends by saying that "I shall not see you beat, while you fight like a Man". On 7 June 1790 in a brief note Robert he advises "That whether, doing, suffering, or forebearing, You may do miracles by persevering".

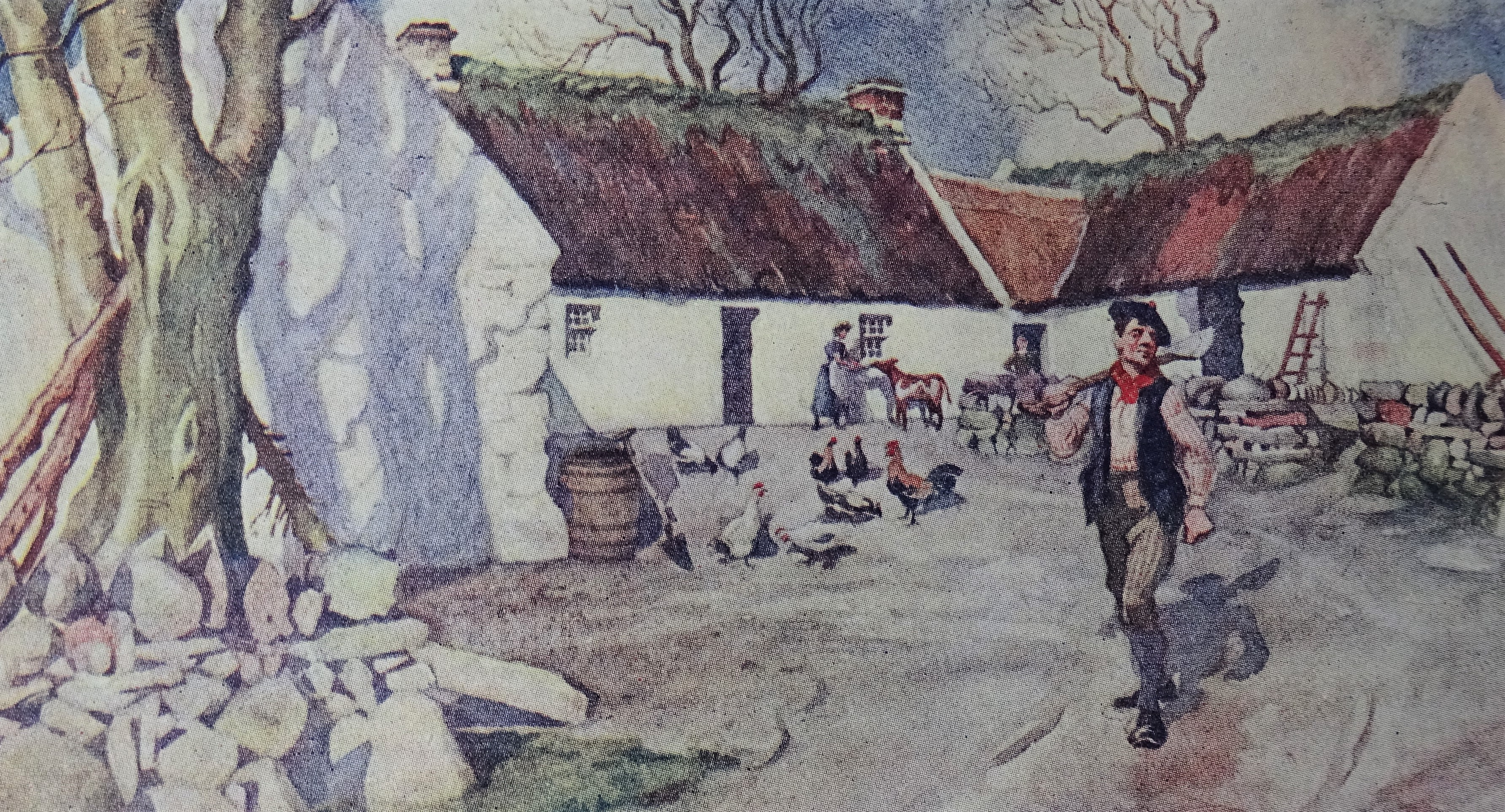
Mount Oliphant Farm at the time of William Burns.

On 10 February 1790, Robert wrote from Ellisland Farm, counselling William of the dangers he faced in London, especially "that universal vice, Bad Women". William fell in love with an unnamed lady whilst in the capital, Robert however in May 1789 had already advised William: "I am, you know, a veteran in these campaigns, so let me advise you always to pay your particular assiduities and try for intimacy as soon as you feel the first symptoms of passion; this is not only best, as making the most of the little entertainment which the sportabilities of distant addresses always gives, but is the best preservative for one's peace. I need not caution you against guilty amours — they are bad everywhere, but in England they are the very devil". The term 'intimacy' did not imply the closest physical relationship in Robert's time.

Robert cared greatly for William's welfare, often making it clear that he would help him financially if need be. William seems to have been a youth who was easily discouraged, Robert writing that "I beg you will endeavour to pluck up a little more of the man than you used to have'; and again: 'In a word, if ever you be, as perhaps you may be, in a strait for a little ready cash, you know my direction; I shall not see you bent while you fight like a man".

On 16 July 1790 Robert had written that John Murdoch the family's old teacher in Alloway would contact him.

On 30 July 1790 Robert wrote to Frances saying of William's death "... a fine, worthy, young fellow; and while my bossom laboured with the anguish consequent on the distressing intelligence".

== See also ==
- Agnes Burns (sister)
- Annabella Burns (sister)
- Isabella Burns (sister)
- John Burns (brother)
- Gilbert Burns (brother)
- Francis Wallace Burns (son)
- Elizabeth Riddell Burns (daughter)
