= John Burns (farmer) =

Unmarried youngest brother of the poet Robert Burns

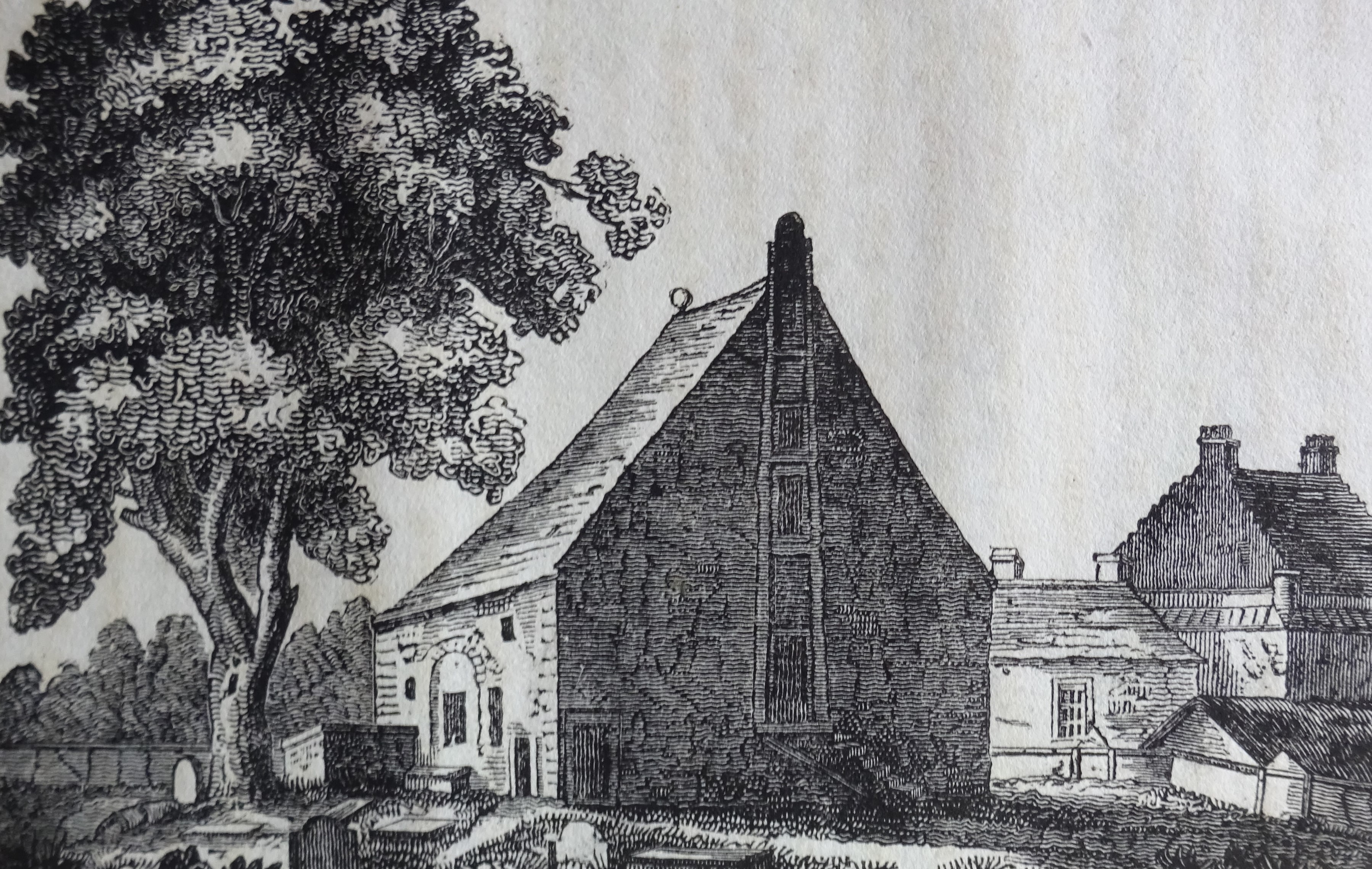
- The old Mauchline Kirk in 1820
- Born: 12 July 1769; Mount Oliphant, Alloway
- Died: 28 October 1785 (aged 16); Mossgiel Farm, Tarbolton
- Occupations: Farm labourer & Apprentice Weaver
- Spouse: Unmarried
- Children: None
- Parent(s): William Burnes; Agnes Broun

John Burns (1769–1785) was the youngest brother of the poet Robert Burns and the last son born to William Burness and Agnes Broun. John was born at Mount Oliphant Farm on the Doonholm Estate near Alloway on the 12 July 1769. He was christened circa 21 July 1769 by Rev. Rev William Dalrymple.

== Life and background ==
His siblings were Robert Burns (b. 25 January 1759); Gilbert (b. 28 September 1760); Agnes (b. 30 September 1762); William Burnes (b. 30 July 1760); Annabella (b. 14 November 1764); Isabella (b. 27 July 1771).

The family moved from Mount Oliphant to Lochlea Farm near Alloway in 1777 and then moved to Mossgiel Farm near Mauchline in 1784 after John's father William Burness had died. At Mossgiel Farm John would have worked as a labourer like his brothers and here he shared a tiny room in the loft with his older brother William. John was an apprentice weaver however he had a history of illness.

=== Death ===
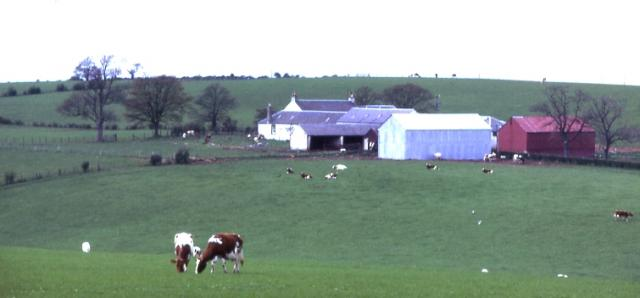
Lochlea Farm

John was only sixteen when he died at Mossgiel Farm on 28 October 1785 from causes unknown. He was buried in an unmarked grave at Mauchline on November 1, said to be near the north-west corner of the present day kirk. however a commemorative plaque has been placed on the church wall by the Mauchline Burns Club that reads "Within the walls of this churchyard is interred the body of John Burns Born 1769 - Died 1785. Brother of Robert Burns (poet). Mauchline Burns Club 1999."

The entry in the church records reads "John Burns, Mosgiel, Buried on 1st Nov. in second Mort cloth, for which the cost was 5 shillings". The use of a second quality mort-cloth would indicate that the family were struggling financially at the time.

The Mort-cloth would have been black to indicate mourning and was drapped over the coffin or just over the body in cases where relatives could not afford a coffin. At Burn's time it was used by all classes of society, was not buried with the corpse and could be hired from the kirk session.

William Scott Douglas published a report in 1877 that Isabella Burns recalled that her youngest brother had died in 1783, whilst the family were farming at Lochlea and that he was buried at Kirk Alloway in what also became his father's lair when he died on 13 February 1784. It was said that when she was buried in 1858 at the family lair in Alloway kirkyard the gravedigger exposed the bones of both her father and of John. As stated however the Mauchline Kirk records however state that he died in 1785 whilst at Mossgiel and that he was actually buried in the Mauchline parish kirkyard. Isabella would have been around fourteen years of age in 1785.

== Association with Robert Burns ==
John was Robert's youngest brother, but little is known about him as he is not mentioned in any of the surviving letters written by Burns.

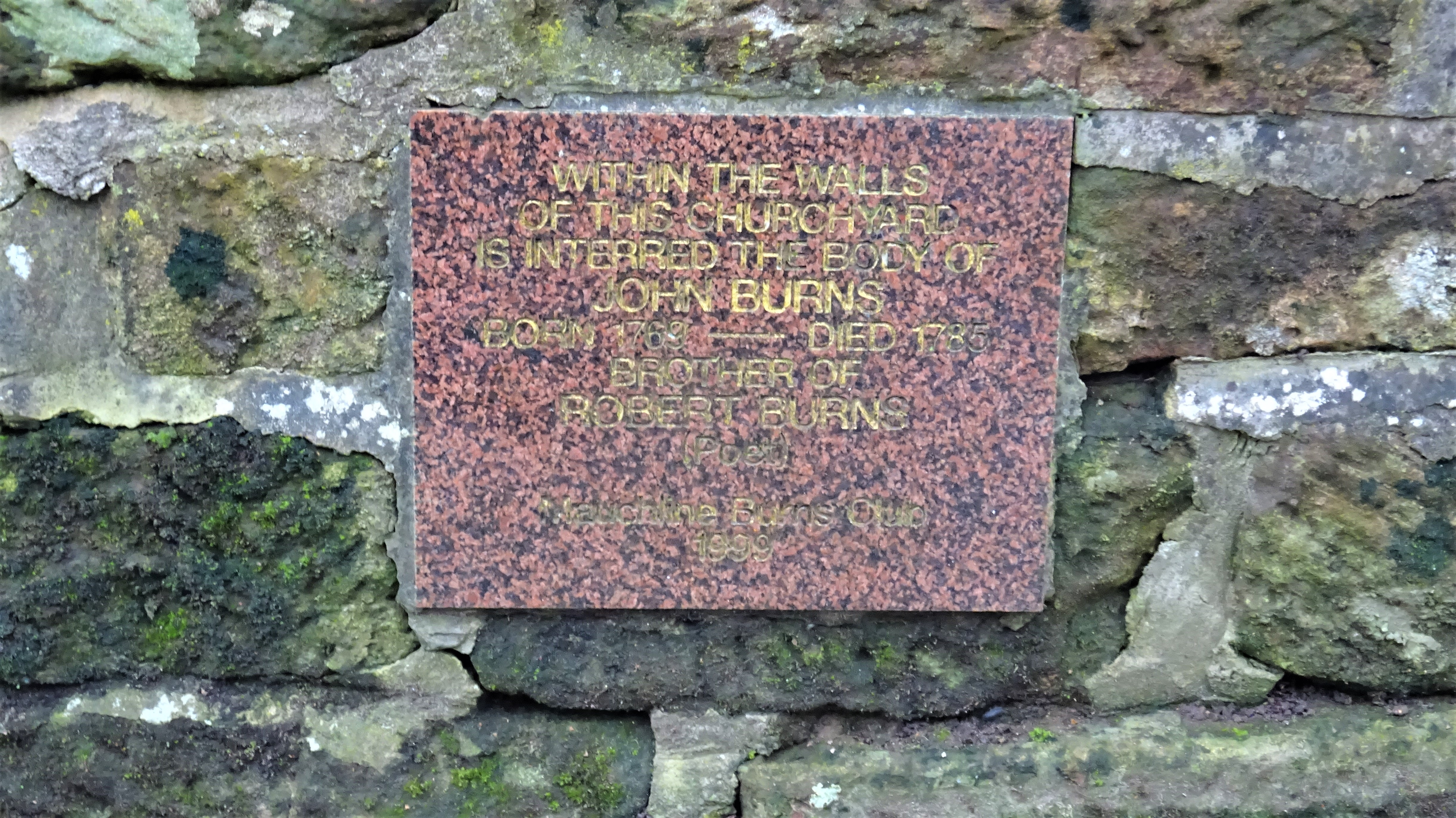
Memorial stone to John Burns at Mauchline Churchyard.

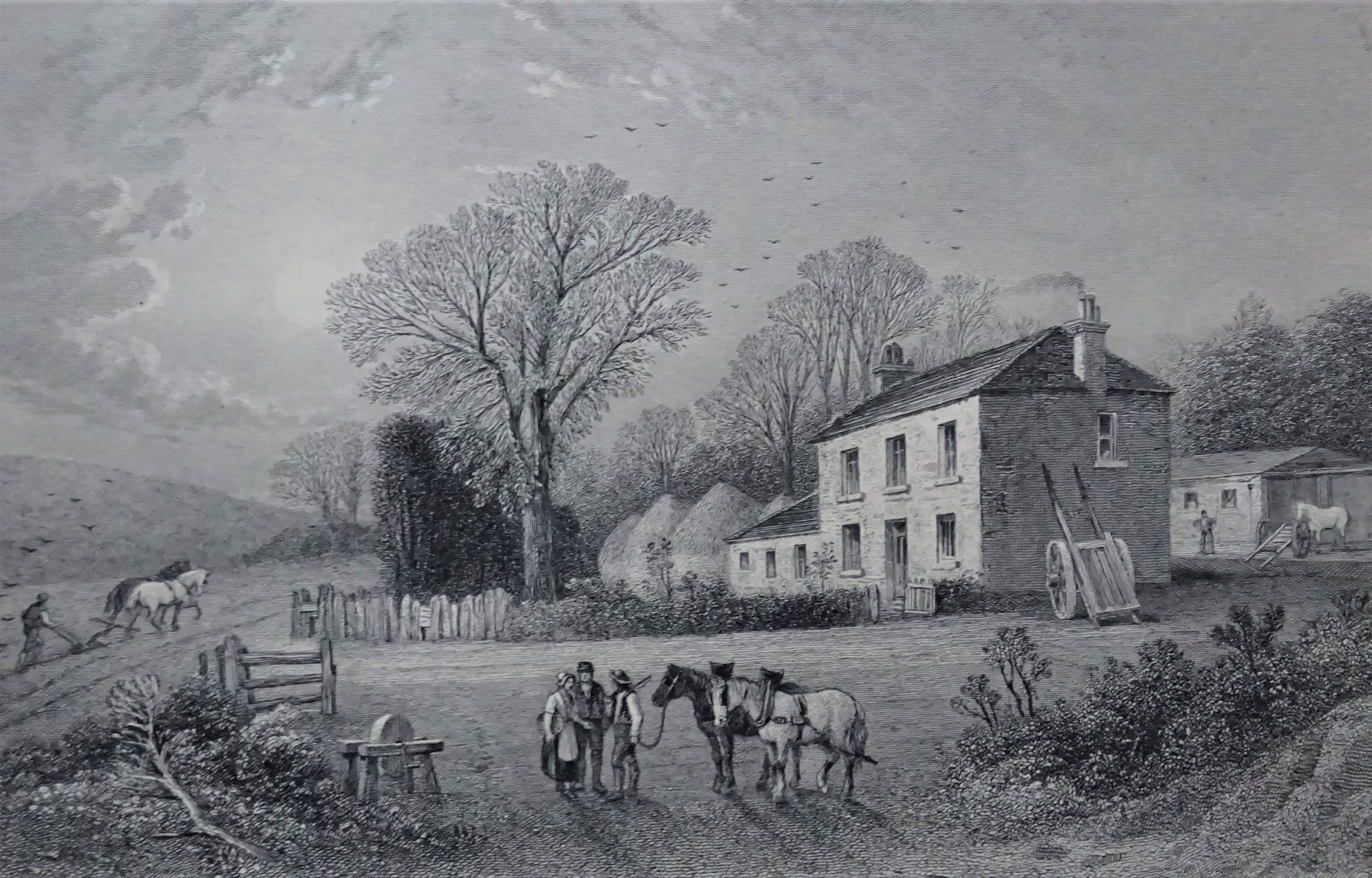
A much altered Mossgiel Farm in 1878

John and his siblings religious education was partly taught at home by their father, using the A Manual of Religious Belief that William Burnes had written for that purpose, assisted by John Murdoch.

Whilst at Mount Oliphant or Lochlea Farm Robert wrote a story, The Marriage of Robin Redbreast and the Wren, for his young siblings. John's youngest sister Isabella remembered this story and told it to Dr Chambers in 1850/51. The story was published in Chambers's Nursery Rhymes of Scotland.

It may be significant that Burns's last, somewhat abrupt entry into his First Commonplace Book was on an unrecorded day in October 1785, the same month, possibly the same day, that his youngest brother died, the first of his siblings to do so. The entry was: "Oct: 85 } If ever any young man, on the vestibule of the world, chance to throw his eye over these pages, let him pay a warm attention to the following observation; as I assure him they are the fruit of a poor devil's dear bought Experience"; Burns finished with "In the first place, let my Pupil, as he tenders his own peace, keep up a regular, warm intercourse with the Deity".

== See also ==
- Jean Armour (sister-in-law)
- Robert Burnes (uncle)
- Gilbert Burns (farmer) (brother)
- William Burnes (father)
- Agnes Broun (mother)
- Annabella Burns (sister)
- Francis Wallace Burns (nephew)
- Elizabeth Riddell Burns (niece)
