= Annabella Burns =

Unmarried sister of the poet Robert Burns

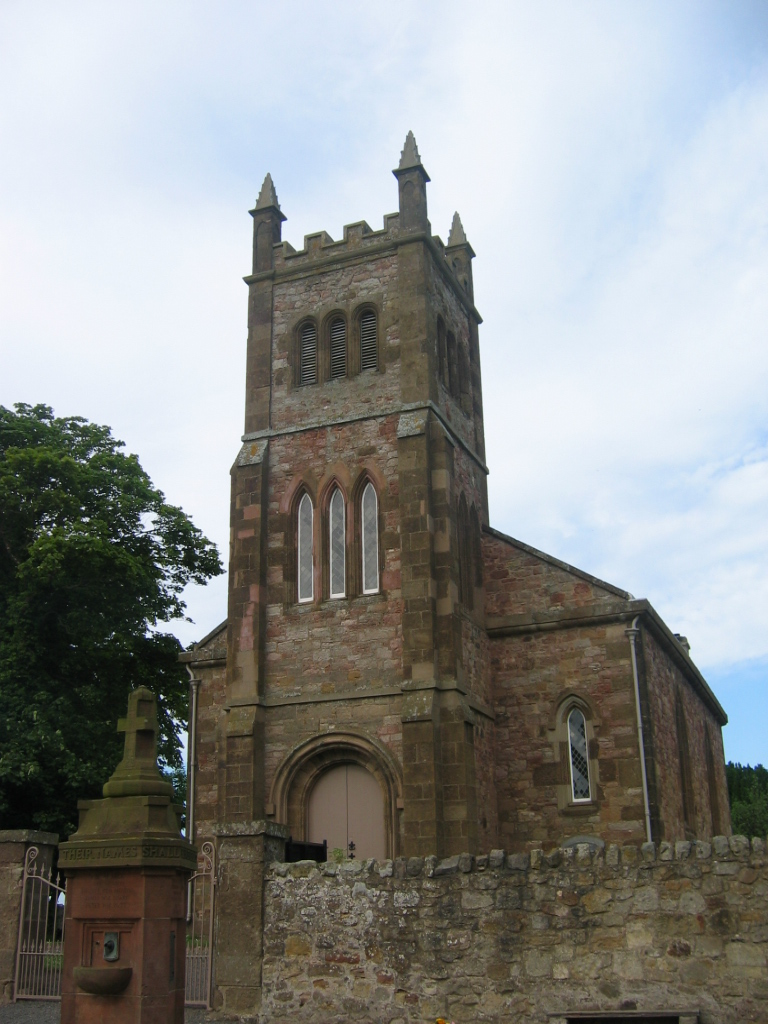
- Bolton Kirk
- Born: 14 November 1764; Alloway
- Died: 2 March 1832 (aged 67); Grant's Brae, Haddington
- Spouse: Unmarried
- Parent(s): William Burnes; Agnes Broun

Annabella Burns or Nannie Burns (1764–1832) was the second oldest sister of the poet Robert Burns, and the last child born to William Burness and Agnes Broun whilst at the Alloway cottage. She was born on the 14 November 1764 and she was christened on 17 November by Rev. William Dalrymple, the minister of Ayr Parish Church. When she died in 1832 she was the last member of Gilbert Burns's household at Grant's Brae to be buried at the Bolton Kirk family lair. Gilbert Burns had died, also aged 67, five years earlier in 1827.

== Life and background ==
Her father, William Burnes, was 43 when Annabella was born and her mother, Agnes Brown, was 32. Her siblings were Robert Burns (b. 25 January 1759); Gilbert (b. 28 September 1760); Agnes (b. 30 September 1762); William (b. 30 July 1767); John (b. 10 July 1769); Isabella (b. 27 July 1771). 7

Whilst at Mossgiel Farm Agnes Burnes slept in a recess bed in the kitchen whilst sisters Annabella and Agnes slept in fixed beds along the back wall in the larger adjoining room.

Isabella Burns remembered her sister Annabella taking her to dance with Matthew Paterson at Tarbolton's Bacherlors' Club after his intended partner failed to turn up.

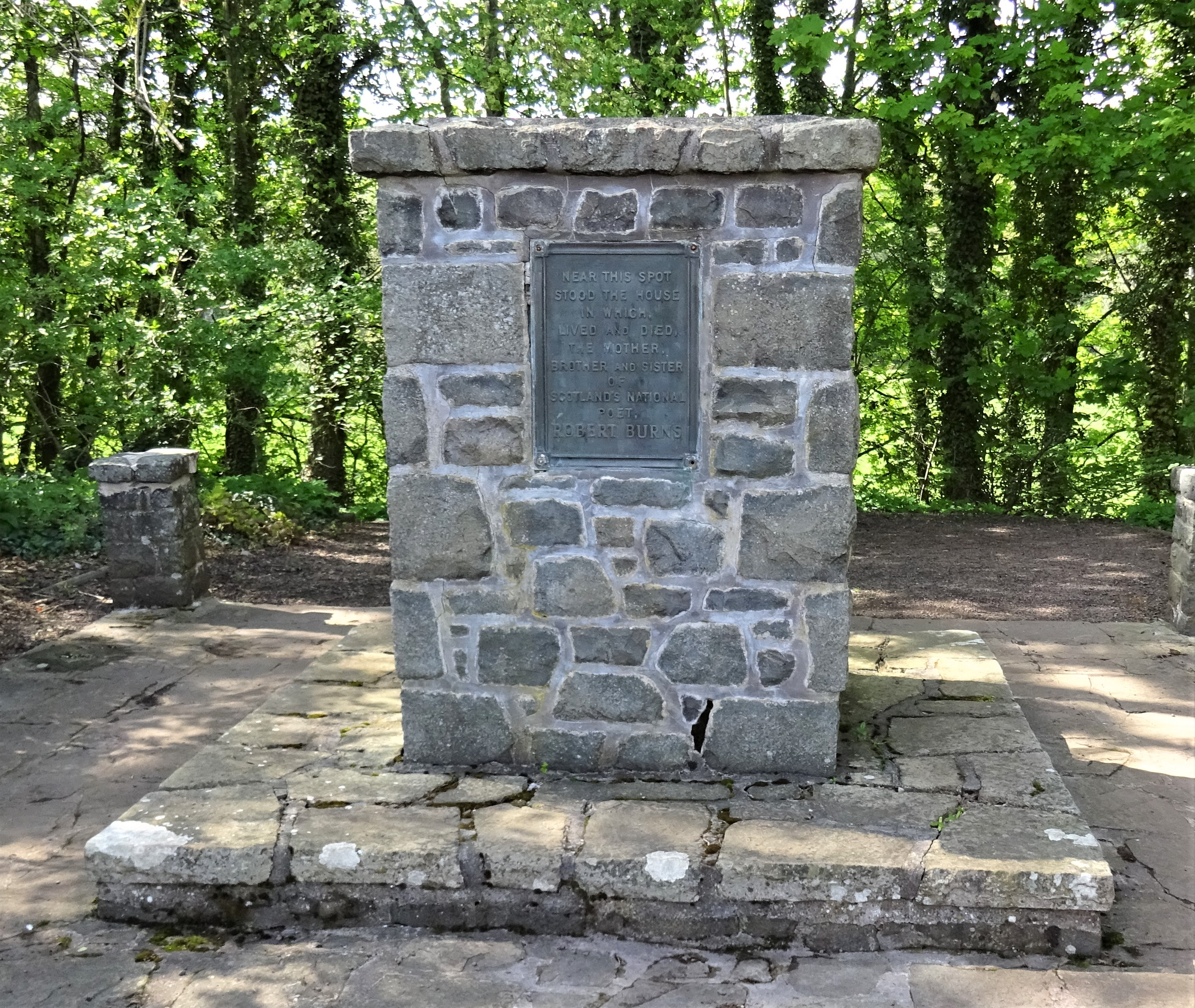
Memorial at the Grant's Brae Cottage site

Annabella never married and she and her mother lived with Gilbert Burns and his family. Gilbert left Mossgiel Farm in 1798 and then farmed at Dinning in Nithsdale for two years. Gilbert and the extended family left Dinning before the lease was up as he was appointed by the son of Frances Dunlop, Captain John Dunlop, as estate manager at Morham West Mains, East Lothian for four years. John Begg, husband of Isabella Burns, took up the lease on Dinning.

After a few years at Morham West Mains Annabella moved to Grant's Brae on the road to Bolton and spent the remainder of her days there, Gilbert being the factor of the Lennoxlove estates owned by Lady Katherine Blantyre. She was, as stated, buried with her mother, Gilbert and a number of his children at Bolton Kirk, Bolton Parish, south of Haddington.

The text on the family tombstone reads -

Erected by GILBERT BURNS, factor at Grants Brae in memory of his children ISABELLA who died 3 July 1815 in the 7th year of her age, AGNES who died 11th Sept 1815 in the 15th year of her age, JANET who died 30 Octr 1816 in the 18th year of her age. And of his mother, AGNES BROWN who died 14 Jany 1820 in the 88th year of her age; whose mortal remains lie all buried here. Also of other two of his children viz. JEAN who died on 4 Jany 1827 in the 20th year of her age and JOHN who died on the 26 Feby 1827 in the 25th year of his age. GILBERT BURNS thier [sic] father died on the 8 April 1827 in the 67th year of his age. Also buried here, ANNABELLA, sister of Gilbert Burns, who died March 2, 1832 aged 67.

== Association with Robert Burns ==
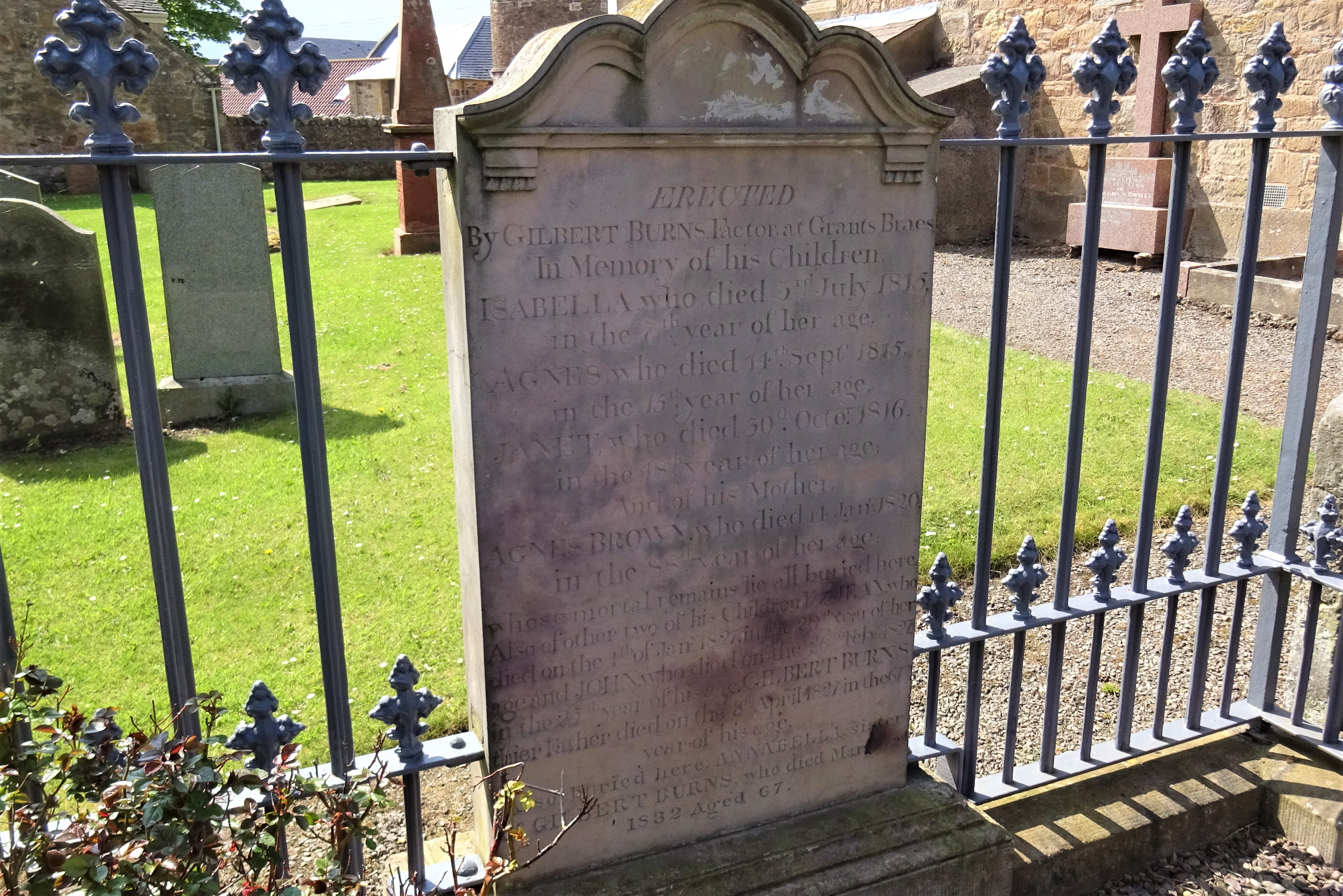
Annabella's joint family gravestone at Bolton Kirk

Annabella was Robert Burns's second oldest sister, Agnes being the oldest and Isabella the youngest.

Annabella and her siblings religious education was partly taught at home by their father, using the A Manual of Religious Belief that William Burnes had written for that purpose, assisted by John Murdoch.

Annabella's niece Isabella wrote to Dr Chambers and informed him that it was her Uncle Gilbert and his sisters, therefore including Annabella, who were set against Robert marrying Elizabeth Paton.

Whilst at Mount Oliphant or Lochlea Farm Robert wrote a story, The Marriage of Robin Redbreast and the Wren, for his young siblings. Annabella's younger sister Isabella remembered this story and told it to Dr Chambers in 1850/51. The story was published in Chamber's Nursery Rhymes of Scotland.

In August 1788 Annabella and Isabella were present at the birth of Burns's second son, Francis Wallace, at Ellisland Farm on 18 August 1788.

Her brother Robert referred to Annabella as 'Nannie' or 'Nanny' in his letters. On 25 March 1789 he wrote to his brother William saying that "Your sister Nannie arrived here yester night, and begs to be remembered to you." On 15 April 1789 he wrote that "The inclosed is from Gilbert brought by your sister Nanny."

She visited her brother Robert in March 1789 whilst he was at the Isle, a small country house in Nithsdale, owned by David Newall, a Dumfries lawyer. Ellisland Farm was not yet habitable at this date.

== See also ==
- Jean Armour
- Robert Burnes
- Gilbert Burns (farmer)
- William Burnes
- Agnes Broun
- Elizabeth 'Betty' Burns
