= Agnes Burns =

Sister of Scottish poet Robert Burns

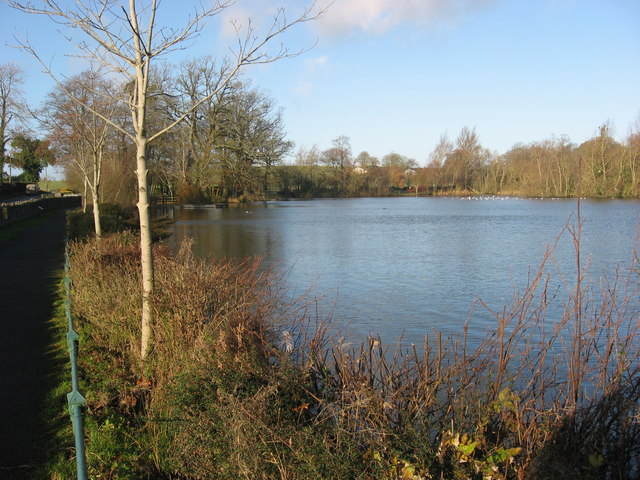
- Stephenstown Pond
- Born: 30 September 1762; Alloway, Scotland
- Died: March 1834; Dundalk, Co. Louth, Republic of Ireland (which at that time was still part of the United Kingdom)
- Occupation: Dairymaid
- Spouse: William Galt
- Parent(s): William Burnes; Agnes Broun

Agnes Burns or Agnes Galt was the eldest sister of Scottish poet and lyricist Robert Burns. She was born in 1762 at the Alloway Cottage in South Ayrshire to William Burnes and Agnes Broun. She did not adopt the spelling 'Burnes'. At the advanced age of forty-two, late for the times in which she lived, she married William Galt at Dinning in 1804 who had worked for her brother Gilbert at Dinning Farm in Nithsdale.

== Life and character ==
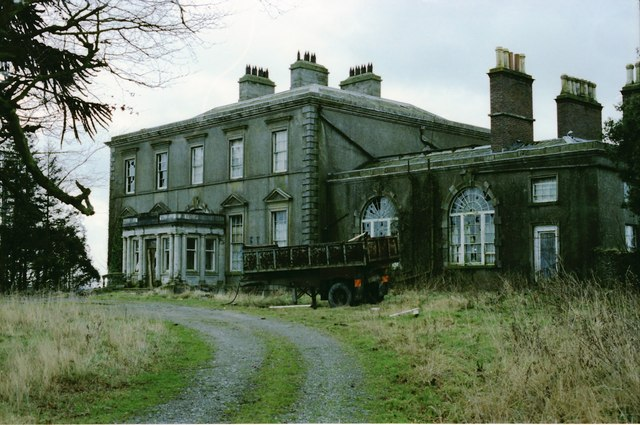
Stephenstown House in 1982.

Agnes's siblings were Robert Burns (b. 25 January 1759); Gilbert (b. 28 September 1760); Annabella Burns (b. 14 November 1764); William (b. 30 July 1767); John (b. 10 July 1769); Isabella (b. 27 July 1771).

Agnes Broun recalled that her husband only once took a strap to his children and that was to their daughter Agnes when she showed reluctance to pay attention to his reading lessons and that "..it had had a good effect upon the child's temper."

Agnes moved in 1817 with William to the Fortescue Estates at Stephenstown in Dundalk, County Louth, Republic of Ireland where he was employed to build two reservoirs to supply water to the estate gardens, orchards, grinding mill, etc. Impressed with his work, Matthew Fortescue offered him the post of Confidential Manager on the Stephenstown Estate for the generous salary of 40 guineas per annum that also came with a tied cottage that was built for them and a plot of land for growing crops, keeping a cow or two, etc. William also stocked the ponds with a number of coarse fish.

Stephenstown House had been built in 1785 by Matthew Fortescue for his new bride Marian McClintock. It was sold by the Fortescues in 1974 and was a ruin by the late 1980s.

William in the years 1821–1822 planted 53,000 trees on the estate as well as many shrubs and flowers. He also insisted on buying the best farm equipment and as a result in 1847, part of the Fortescue estate was considered to be one of the best farms in the British Isles.

It is recorded by Major McClintock that she had a strong Ayrshire accent, saying that "she was as unprepossessing a female as one would care to see. But, oh! to hear her read her brother's poems was a caution, with hard rasping delivery, that I question if many out of Ayrshire could make out the meaning of a word she said."

The couple never had any children and Agnes worked on the estate for many years as a dairy maid. Agnes died in the cottage in 1834 aged 72 and William lived on at the estate at Lakeview Cottage for another thirteen years until he died in 1847.

== Memorial and association with Robert Burns ==
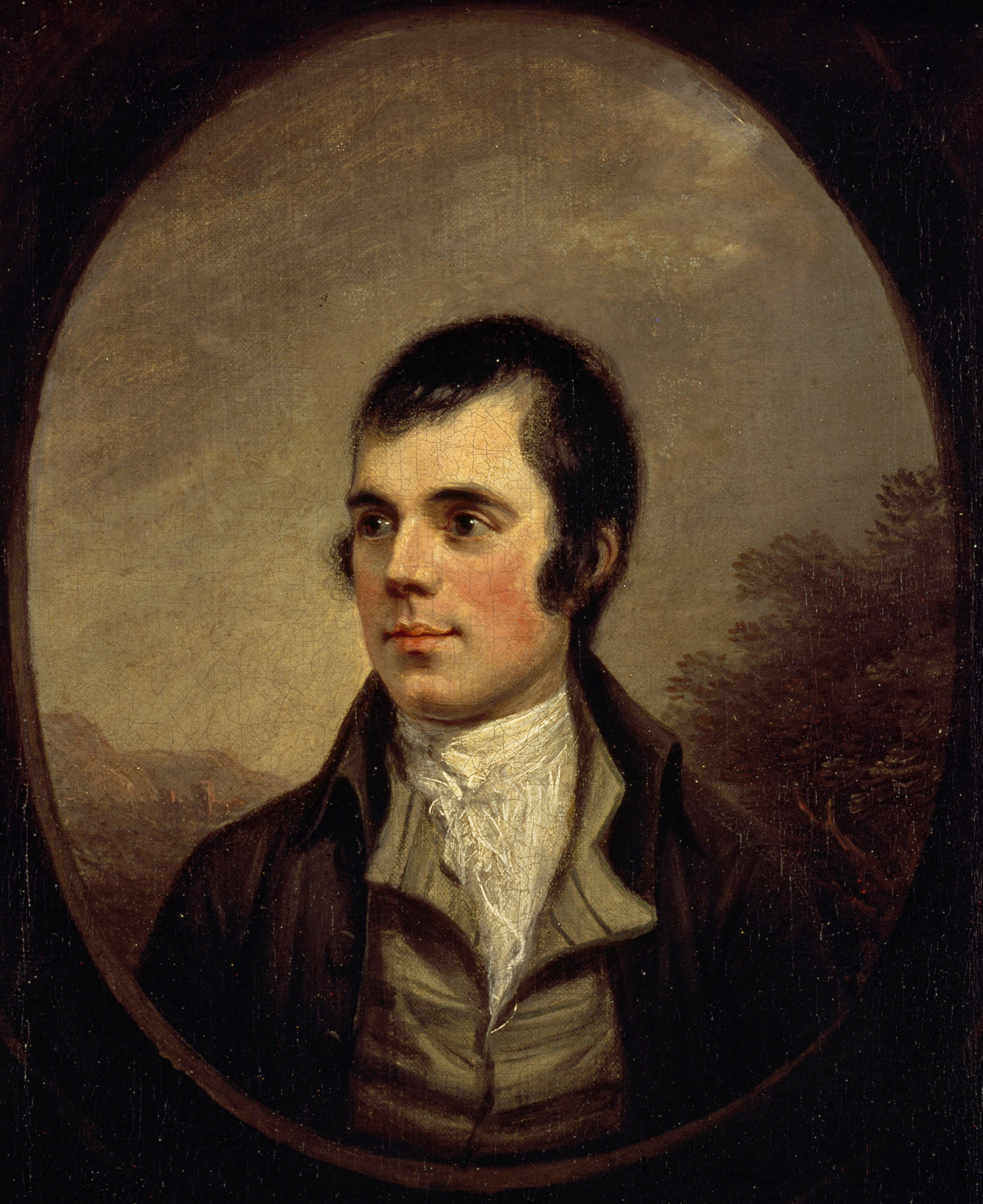
Full view of the Naysmith portrait of 1787, Scottish National Portrait Gallery

The couple were buried in the St Nicholas, Dundalk, Church of Ireland cemetery where a monument was erected by admirers of Robert Burns.

The inscription on the memorial commemorating the centenary of his birth reads:

As a tribute to the genius of Robert Burns, the national bard of Scotland and in respect for the memory of his eldest sister Agnes, whose mortal remains are deposited in this church-yard erected by the contributions of the poet's numerous admirers in Dundalk and its vicinity 25th of January 1839.

"Time but the impression stronger makes, as streams their channels deeper wear." (From "To Mary in Heaven", 1789)

Agnes's religious education was partly taught at home by her father, using the A Manual of Religious Belief that William Burnes had written for that purpose, assisted by John murdoch. It was used for her siblings as well as herself.

== Stephenstown Pond Project ==
William and Agnes's cottage at Knockbridge is now a museum and coffee shop in a nature park and conference centre. The cottage's museum section explores the life and works of the poet as well as interpreting his sister's life as a dairymaid on the estate, the estate itself and the Fortescue family. The Belfast Burns Club and the Stephenstown Pond Trust undertook the restoration project in 1996 writing that

We, the Belfast Burns Club, recognised that some form of Peace and Reconciliation Initiative in this island of ours might not go astray, and what better format for it to take but an association with Robert Burns and his work?

== See also ==
- Jean Armour
- Alison Begbie
- Agnes Broun (mother)
- William Burnes (father)
- Elizabeth 'Betty' Burns (sister)
- Gilbert Burns (farmer) (brother)
- Isabella Burns (sister)
- May Cameron
- Mary Campbell (Highland Mary)
- Jenny Clow
- Nelly Kilpatrick
- Jessie Lewars
- Anne Rankine
- Isabella Steven
- Peggy Thompson
