= William Dalrymple (moderator) =

Scottish minister and religious writer

- Born: 29 August 1723; Ayr, Scotland
- Died: 28 January 1814
- Education: University of St Andrews
- Religion: Christianity (Presbyterian)
- Church: Church of Scotland
- Ordained: 1746
- Congregations served: Ayr
- Offices held: Minister, Moderator

William Dalrymple (29 August 1723 – 28 January 1814) was a Scottish religious writer, minister and Moderator of the Church of Scotland in 1781. He is remembered in a poem by Robert Burns.

== Biography ==
William Dalrymple was a younger son of James Dalrymple, sheriff-clerk of Ayr. He was born at Ayr on 29 August 1723, and after a local education studied at Glasgow University graduating MA in 1740. He was licensed to preach by the Presbytery of Ayr in May 1745.

He was ordained as a minister of the Church of Scotland, as the second charge in Ayr in December 1746, from which he was translated to the first charge in 1756. As a minister he was the man who baptised Robert Burns on 26 January 1759. As the local minister Burns held him in high esteem.

He received the honorary doctorate of Doctor of Divinity from the University of St Andrews in 1779.

He was elected Moderator of the General Assembly of the Church of Scotland in 1781, replacing Rev Harry Spens. He was succeeded in turn by Rev Joseph McCormick.

He died on 28 January 1814, having been one of the ministers of Ayr for the long period of sixty-eight years. Dalrymple was the author of several religious works.

== Family ==
In August 1749 he married Susannah Hunter daughter of Rev John Hunter, his predecessor at Ayr parish church. Their descendants included William Dalrymple Maclagan the Archbishop of Canterbury and Prof Douglas Maclagan.

== Publications ==
- Family Worship Explained (1787)
- A History of Christ (1787)
- Faith in Jesus Christ (1790)
- The Acts of the Apostles Made Easy (1790)
- The Mosaic Account of the Creation (1794)
- Meditations and Prayers (1795)
- Legacy of Dying Thoughts (1796)
- Solomon's Ethics or the Book of Proverbs Made Easy (1799)
- The Scripture Jewish History (1803)
- Statistical Account of the Parish of Ayr

== Criticism ==
Dalrymple is chiefly remembered Robert Burns' satirical poem The Kirk's Alarm:

D'rymple mild, D'rymple mild,
Though your heart's like a child,
And your life like the new-driven snaw,
Yet that winna save ye,
Auld Satan must have ye,
For preaching that three's ane an' twa.

— Robert Burns, The Kirk's Alarm

The lines indicate that Dalrymple was accused of holding unsound views on the subject of the Trinity; and the warm admiration which he expressed in the introduction to his History of Christ of a similar work on the death of Christ by his colleague Dr McGill exposed him to criticism when the latter publication brought upon its author a prosecution in the church courts for heresy.

== Character sketch ==
James Gairdner, writing in the Dictionary of National Biography, stated that "Such were, however, the simple piety, meekness, and habitual benevolence of Dr. Dalrymple, that he was universally beloved by his parishioners, and no active proceedings [for heresy] were ever taken against him." Gairdner also gives as an example of his character an anecdote of Dalrymple meeting a beggar in the country who was almost naked, upon which Dalrymple took off his own coat and waistcoat, gave the latter to the beggar; then, putting on his coat again, buttoned it about him and walked home.

According to Gilbert Burns, when a schoolmaster at Ayr, while drunk, said disrespectful things of Dalrymple, the resulting outrage by the people was so strong that he was obliged to leave the place and go to London.

== See also ==
- List of moderators of the General Assembly of the Church of Scotland
