= Alloway =

Coordinates: 55.43°N 4.636°W

Alloway: Scottish Gaelic: Allmhaigh
- Suburb and former village
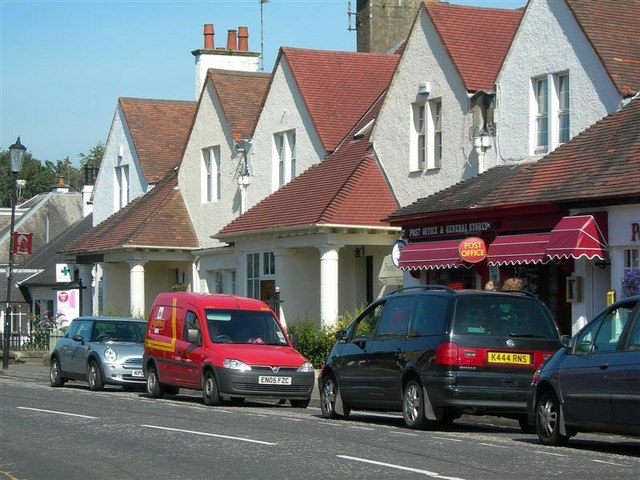
- Shops in Alloway village.

- Location within South Ayrshire
- Population: 4,245
- OS grid reference: NS333184
- Council area: South Ayrshire
- Lieutenancy area: Ayrshire and Arran
- Country: Scotland
- Sovereign state: United Kingdom
- Post town: AYR
- Postcode district: KA7
- Dialling code: 01292
- Police: Scotland
- Fire: Scottish
- Ambulance: Scottish
- UK Parliament: Ayr, Carrick and Cumnock
- Scottish Parliament: Ayr

Alloway (Scottish Gaelic: Allmhaigh, pronounced [ˈal̪ˠavaj]) is a suburb of Ayr, and former village, in South Ayrshire, Scotland, located on the River Doon. It is best known as the birthplace of Robert Burns and the setting for his poem "Tam o' Shanter". Tobias Bachope, the mason responsible for the construction of Hopetoun House, Craigiehall, and Kinross House, also hailed from Alloway. Some historic parts of the village make up a conservation area.

A former village in its own right, Alloway and its surrounding areas were incorporated into the Royal Burgh of Ayr in 1935, and the extended village is now a suburb of Ayr.

== Robert Burns ==
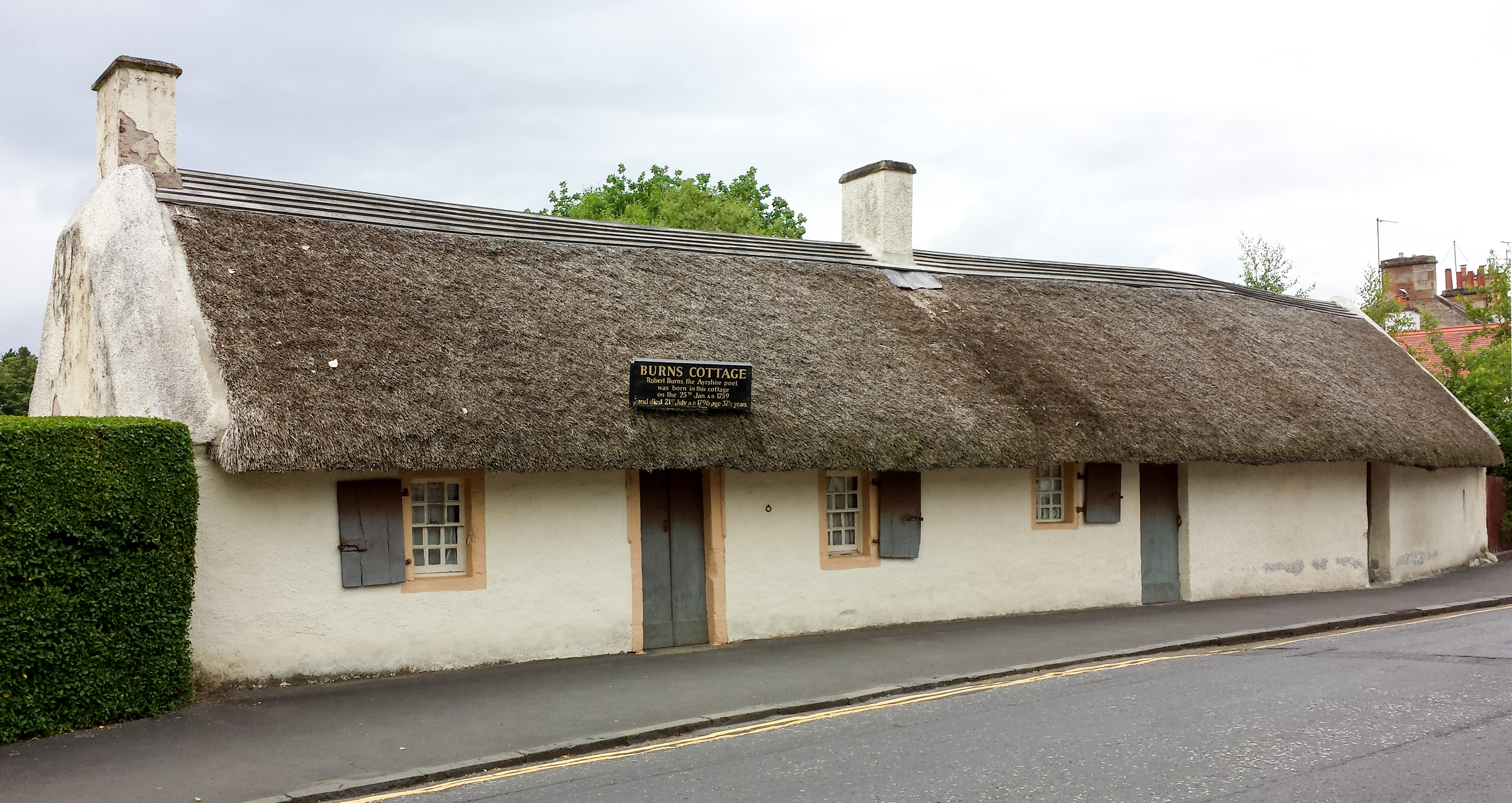
Burns Cottage

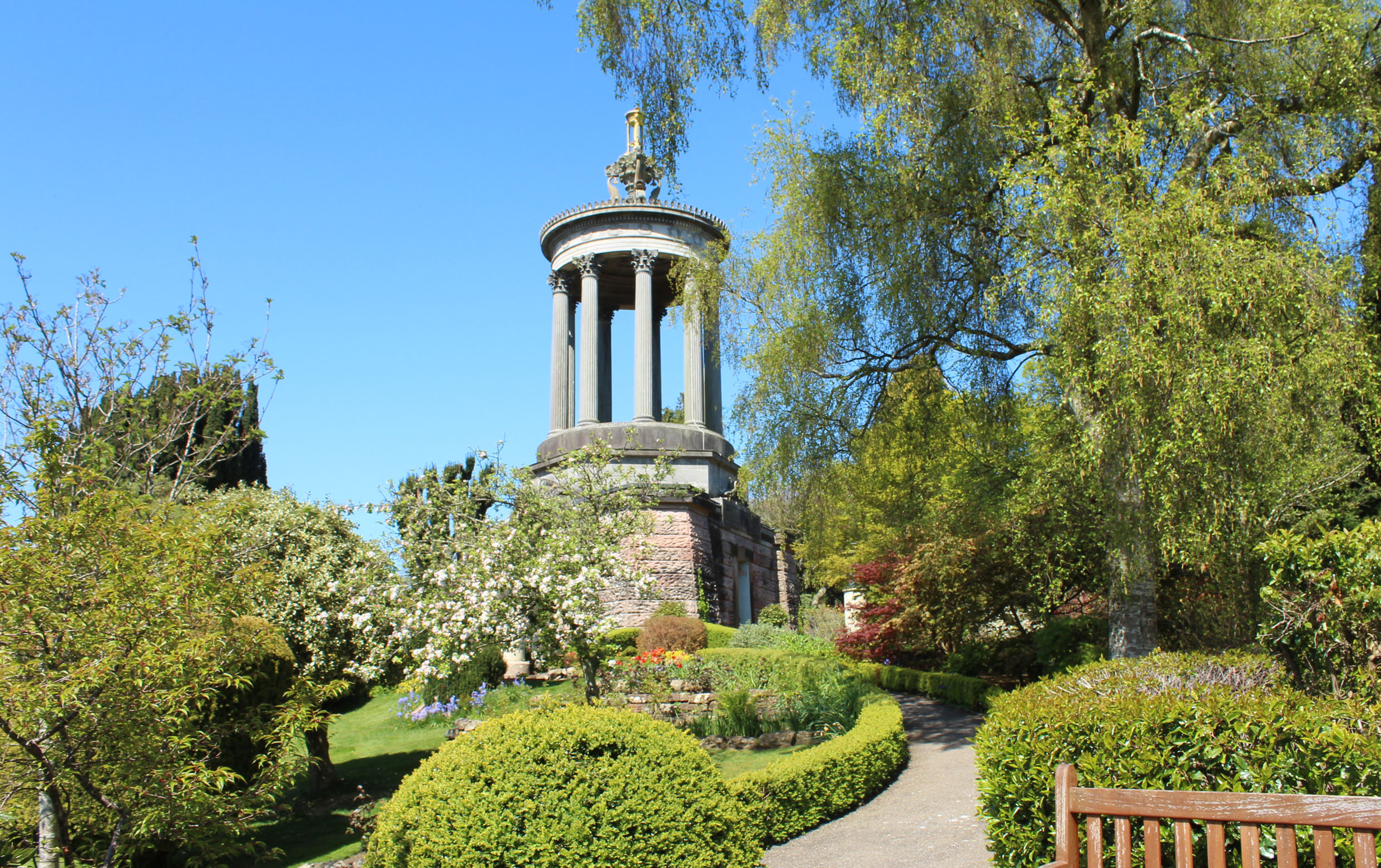
Burns Monument in Alloway

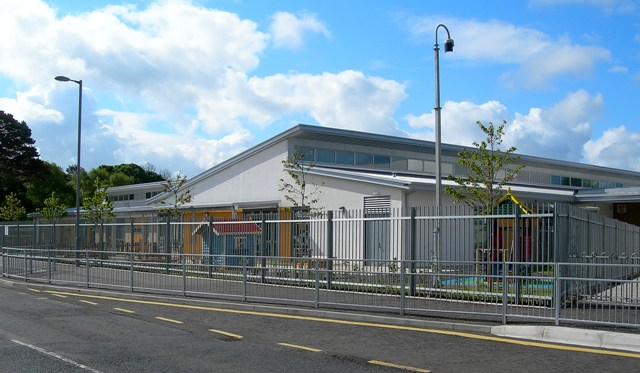
Alloway Primary School

The birthplace of Robert Burns, known as "Burns Cottage", is located in Alloway, now adjacent to a museum containing original manuscripts of his poetry. A 19th-century memorial to Burns, designed by Thomas Hamilton, is located at the foot of the village next to the present church.

The nearby ruined Alloway Auld Kirk and the Brig o' Doon are featured in the poem Tam o' Shanter, and are presently tourist attractions. Burns's father, William Burnes, is buried in the Auld Kirk. To add a "ghostly" appearance to the place, green lights are illuminated over it at night.

The whole site relating to Burns, encompassing Burns Cottage, the Brig o' Doon, Alloway Auld Kirk, the old and new museum buildings, the Burns Monument and relevant local landmarks, is maintained by the National Trust for Scotland as the Robert Burns Birthplace Museum.

== Points of interest ==
=== Facilities ===
Alloway has a primary school, library, post office, general store, church, pharmacy, museum, tearoom and gift shop.

=== Church ===
The Alloway Auld Kirk having been a ruin since the end of the 18th century, a new church was opened for worship on 10 October 1858 and the first minister was called in 1859. As originally built, the new church was rectangular. Modifications in 1878 and 1890 created the present shape. The suite of halls beyond the churchyard was erected in 1965, the session house in 1977 and the octagonal hall in 1987. The minister (since 1999) is the Reverend Neil A. McNaught.

=== Public parks ===
There are two main parks in Alloway. The first, Rozelle, hosts the Ayr Flower Show each summer and has an art gallery which holds various exhibitions throughout the year. Rozelle also maintains a permanent sculpture collection, including a Henry Moore and a series of granite carvings by Ronald Rae. The second, Belleisle Park, houses two golf courses, walled garden, Camelia House, and a playground.

=== Newark Estate & Newark Castle ===
Newark Estate is a pheasant and partridge game shooting estate immediately to the south of Alloway. It has been owned by the Walker family for at least three generations, their family grave being prominent in the churchyard of Alloway Parish Church. Within the estate is Newark Castle (originally called the New-wark of Bargany), an imposing 16th century tower with 17th century and modern additions, situated on rising ground and formerly guarded by a moat, now filled in.

== Sport ==
Cambusdoon New Ground is located in Alloway on the former Robertson's Field, and has hosted a number of Scotland Cricket Internationals. It is also the home of the Ayr Cricket Club, founded in 1859. Ayr Cricket Club has been at Cambusdoon since 1996, when they moved across the road from the original Cambusdoon ground. Ayr Cricket Club moved from the Dam Park to the original Cambusdoon ground in 1935; it remained their home for 60 years until it was sold for housing in 1995. The original cricket ground, which hosted two first-class matches (Scotland vs. Ireland in 1958 and 1974), was developed on the grounds of the former Cambusdoon Estate, once owned by 19th-century iron and coal magnate James Baird. Baird's original Cambusdoon House, now a ruin, was converted to a boys' preparatory school in the late 1920s, and the rest of the estate surrounding the cricket ground was developed for housing in the late 1930s. Former England cricket captain Mike Denness grew up in one of the houses on Shanter Way, which adjoined the cricket ground.

Ayr Hockey Club also play out of the Cambusdoon ground, on a purpose-built floodlit astroturf pitch, which is also used for 5-a-side and 11-a-side football. There is also a bowling green, with the Cricket Club, Hockey Club and Bowling Club being held under the Cambusdoon Sports Club title.

Millbrae, the home of Ayr Rugby Club since 1964, is also located in Alloway.

== Notable residents ==
- Robert Burns, considered the national poet of Scotland, was born in Alloway.
- Samuel Marcus Dill was minister of Alloway 1881 to 1913. He served as Moderator of the General Assembly of the Church of Scotland in 1912.

== See also ==
- Alloway Mote – an old ringwork castle site
