= William Nicol Burns =

Son of the poet Robert Burns

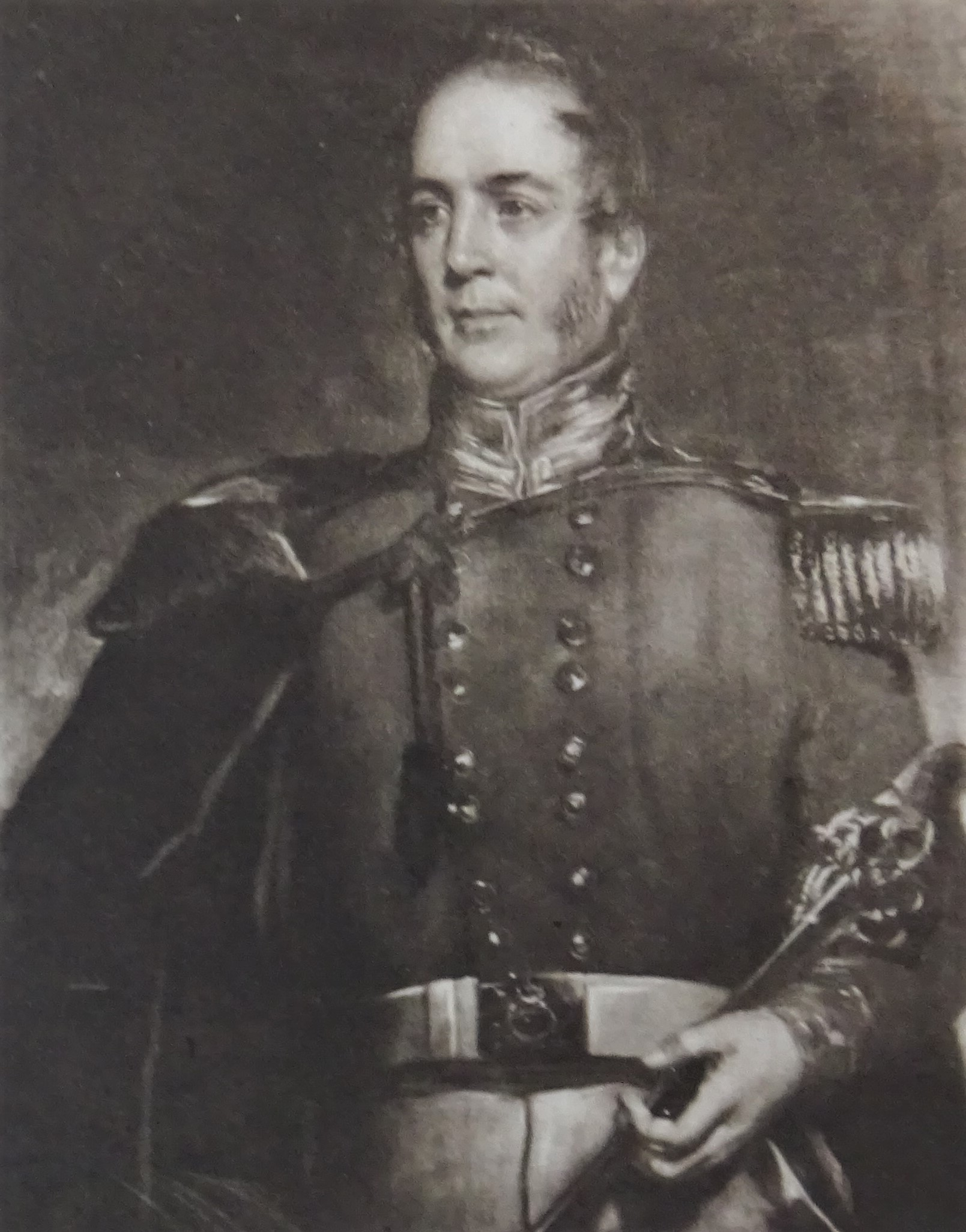
- Colonel William Nicol Burns. Circa 1855
- Born: 9 April 1791; Bank Street, Dumfries, Nithsdale
- Died: 1872; Cheltenham
- Occupation: East India Company officer
- Spouse: Adelaide Crone
- Children: None
- Parent(s): Robert Burns; Jean Armour

William Nicol Burns (1791–1872) was the sixth child, third born and second surviving son born to the poet Robert Burns when he was 32 and his wife Jean Armour was 26. William was born at Ellisland Farm in Dunscore parish, shortly before the family moved to Dumfries in 1791. His first and middle name was added in honour of William Nicol, Robert's friend.

== Life and family ==
William was born at Ellisland Farm in Nithsdale on 9 April 1791, between 3am and 4am as recorded in the family register in the Burns family Bible. The family later moved from Ellisland Farm to the 'Stinking Vennel' in Dumfries on 11 November 1791. In late spring 1793 they made the move to a larger house in Millhole Brae (now Burns Street), where William's mother lived for the remainder of her life following his father's death in 1796. Nine days previous to William's birth an illegitimate daughter, Elizabeth 'Betty' Burns was born to Robert Burns and Ann Park.

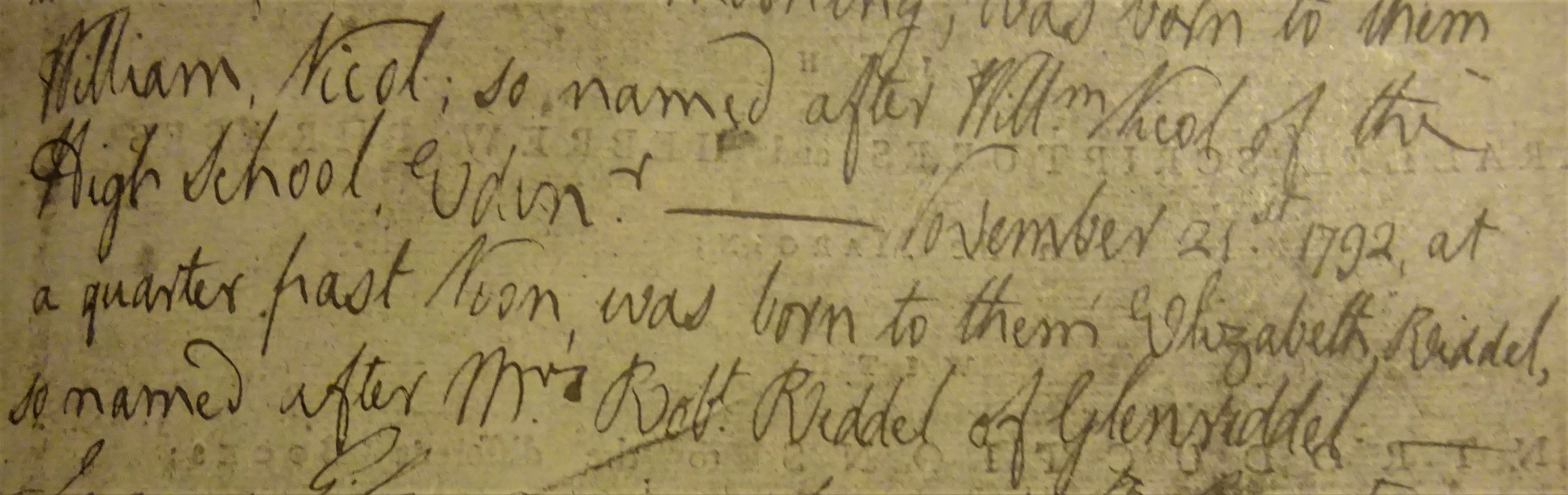
Details from the Burns Family Bible

In May 1795, Burns wrote to George Thomson and explained why he had called his son after the Edinburgh schoolmaster William Nicol, "from that propensity to witty wickedness and manfu' mischief, which even at twa days auld I foresaw would form the striking feature of his disposition." Thomson had commissioned the artist David Allan to produce some illustrations for his Select Collection of Original Scottish Airs for the Voice, and had featured Robert in "The Cotter's Saturday Night", much to his delight. Burns commented that he was inspired by the rascally figure of a little boy in the painting, chasing a cat's tail: "the most striking likeness of an ill-deedie, damn'd, wee, rumble-garie hurchin of mine".

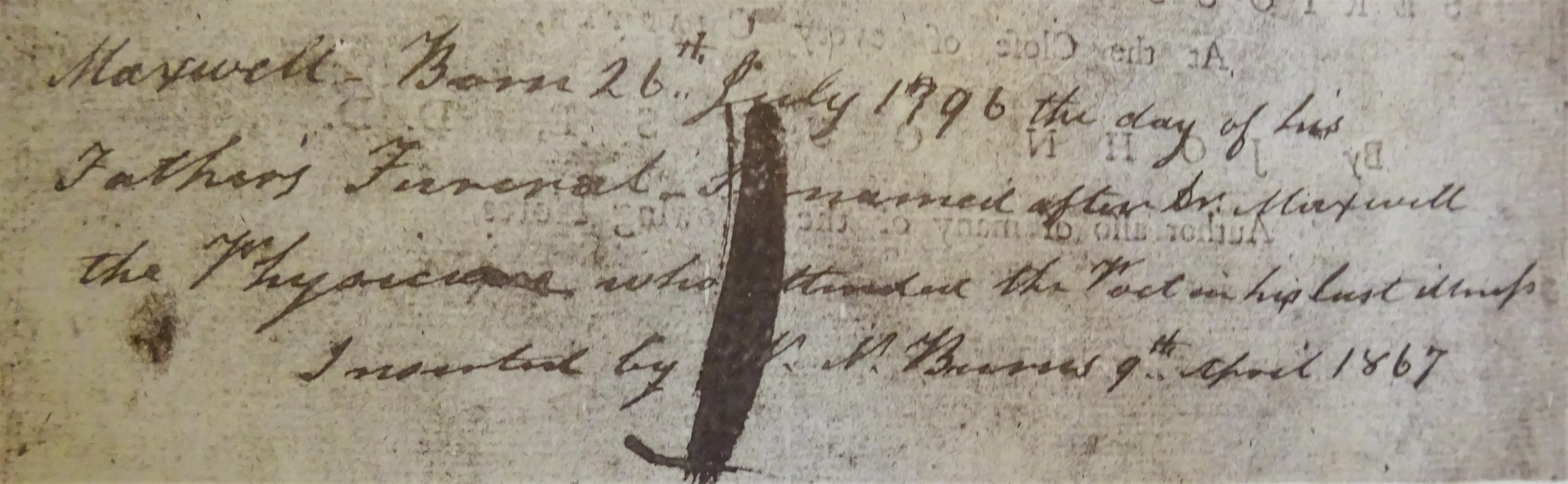
Maxwell's birth entry in the Burns family Bible.

William's siblings were Robert Burns Junior (b. 3 March 1788); Jean (b. 3 March 1788); James Glencairn (b. 12 August 1794); Elizabeth Riddell (b. 21 November 1792); Francis Wallace (b. 1789) and Maxwell (b. 25 July 1796). Short lived unnamed twin girls (b. 3 March 1788). It was William that on 9 April 1867 added details on behalf of his deceased father of Maxwell's birth into the family birth register in the Burns family bible, Maxwell having been born on the very day of Robert Burns's funeral.

Robert informed Mrs Frances Dunlop that his new son, William, was "a fine boy, rather stouter but not so handsome as your God-son at his time of life was. Indeed I look on your little Namesake to be my chief d'oeuvre in that species of manufacture, as I look on "Tam o' Shanter" to be my standard performance in the Poetical line".

In 1818 James Glencairn he was promoted to the Indian Commissariat and was able to assist his mother to the tune of £150 per year that was a very welcome assistance. Eventually he was unable to afford this and William took over and gave the same sum per annum.

Jean Armour left the portrait by Alexander Nasmyth to William Nicol Burns and in due course he bequeathed it to the National Portrait Gallery of Scotland in Edinburgh.

=== William Nicol ===
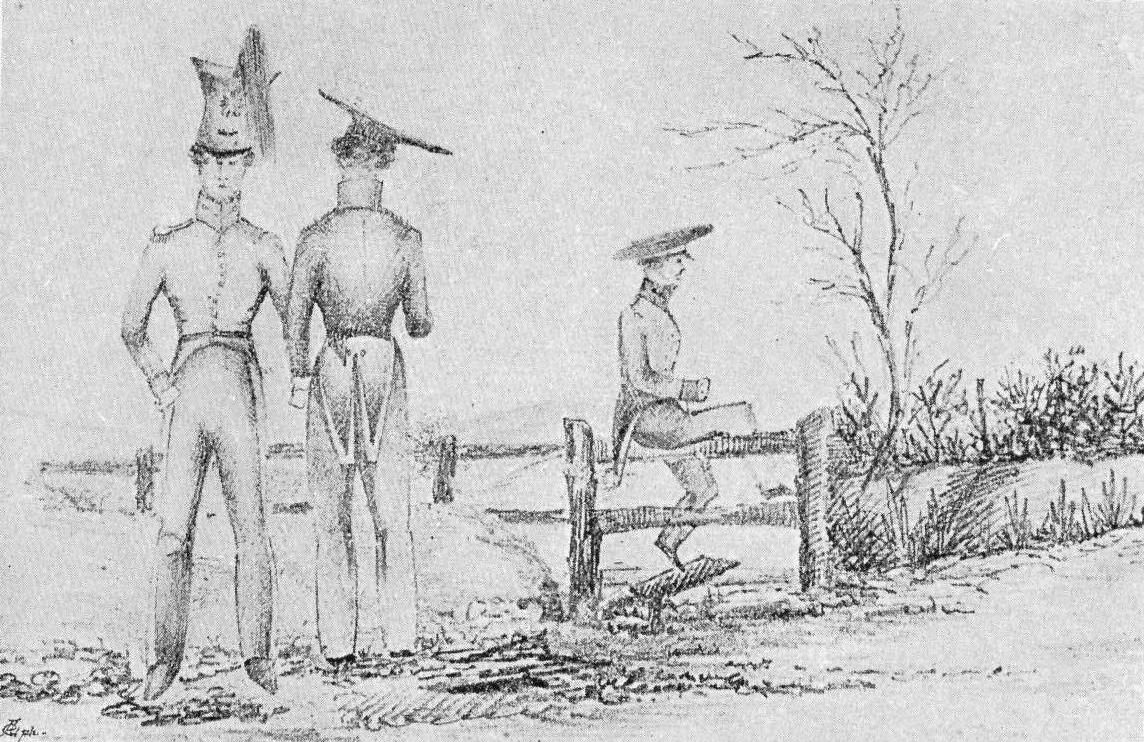
Addiscombe Seminary Cadets.

William Nicol, Burns's friend, took part in an open competition for the post of Classics teacher at the High School in Edinburgh and was successful. He earned a reputation as an excellent scholar, but a very harsh disciplinarian. In his Memorial of His Times, Lord Cockburn commented on Nicol's "constant and indiscriminate harshness" that was "very hurtful to all his pupils". However an Edinburgh lawyer and writer to the signet, Alexander Young of Harburn, regarded Nicol as "one of the greatest Latin scholars of the age". Sir Walter Scott wrote that Nicol was "worthless, drunken and inhumanly cruel to the boys under his charge".

=== Education ===
Educated at Dumfries Grammar School, William later studied at a Charity school, The Bluecoat School, Christ's Hospital, Horsham. Once William had completed his education at Christ's Hospital, he had to be 'discharged' and in William's case this was probably carried out by Sir James Shaw as it was with James Glencairn Burns. James Shaw, when Sheriff of London, also arranged for William to become a cadet in the military service of the Honourable East India Company. James Shaw was born at Riccarton in Ayrshire, the son of John Shaw, whose family had farmed the area of Mosshead for over 300 years. Shaw was a nephew of Gilbert through his wife Jean Breckenridge.

The Marchioness of Hastings and Sir John Reid also assisted James's career. William entered the East India Company Military Seminary at Addiscombe, Surrey where he trained to become an officer in the company's army.

=== Career ===
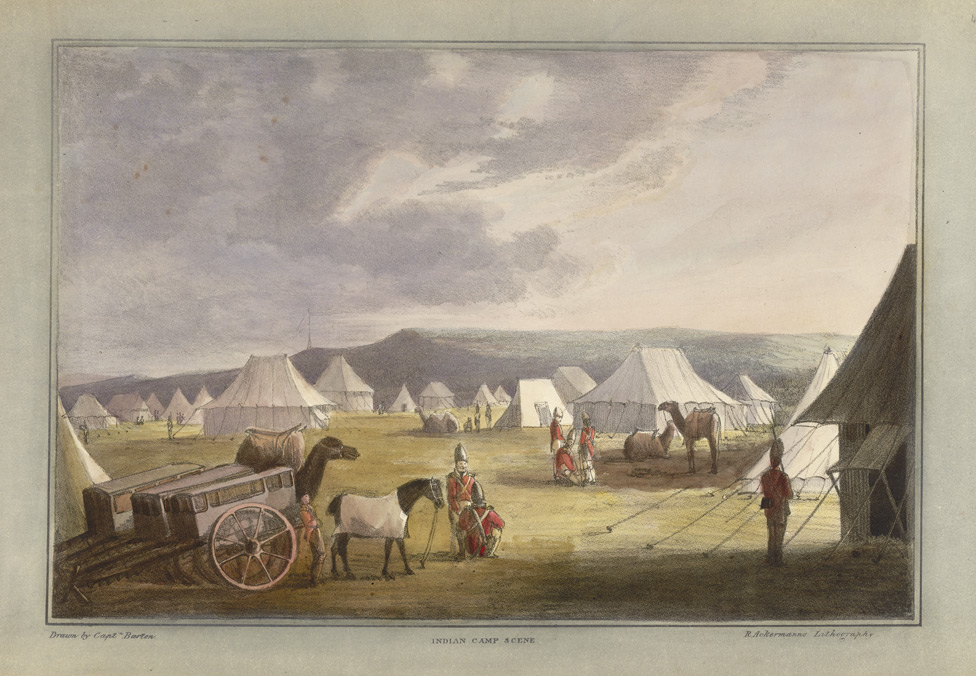
Indian Camp Scene

After William had completed his education at Christ's Hospital he sailed as a midshipman aged 16 to India. The Marchioness of Hastings assisted William's career. Appointed in 1811 to the Army of the East India Company, William rose to the rank of Lieutenant-Colonel of the 7th Madras Native Infantry. Between 1817 and 1819 he was involved in the Third Mahratta War. He had joined the 7th Bengal Native Infantry Regiment as an Ensign on 1 August 1817 and was promoted to the rank of Captain on 7 August 1828. William transferred to the Commissary Department in the Madras Presidency. On 19 January 1843 he retired.

=== Marriage and family ===
William Nicol married Catherine Adelaide Crone, daughter of R.Crone, Esq of Dublin, in Bangalore, in 1824. They had no children and Catherine died at Kulludghev in India on 29 June 1841. William never remarried.

=== Retirement ===
Retiring in 1843 after 33 years service, William moved from India and lived at 3 Berkely Street, Cheltenham with his brother James Glencairn and James's daughters Annie and Sarah. In 1855 William was appointed brevet Colonel. This was a warrant that gave a commissioned officer a higher rank, as a reward for meritorious conduct or gallantry, but may not necessarily confer the precedence, authority, or pay of the real rank.

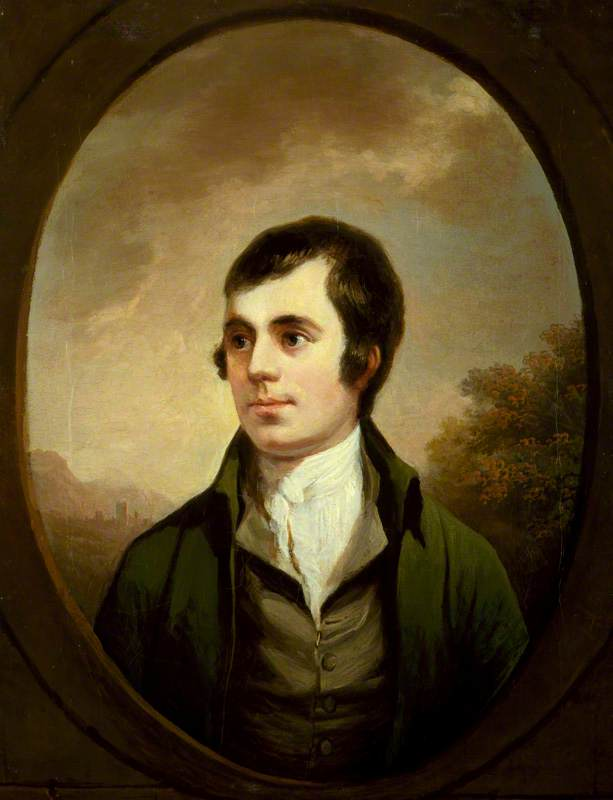
Robert Burns by Alexander Nasmyth

On 6 August 1844 a 'Burns Festival' attended by around 80,000 people took place at Ayr and the Burns Monument at Alloway with William Nicol, James Glencairn and Robert Burns Junior in attendance, the three surviving sons of the poet, together with their aunt Isabella Burns. They sadly refused to meet Robert, their nephew, their father's natural grandson by Elizabeth 'Betty' Burns at the festival.

On 15 August 1844 William Nicol and his brother James Glencairn were entertained in the Kings Arms Hotel, High Street, Irvine by the Irvine Burns Club.

William Nicol died in Cheltenham, Gloucestershire on 21 February 1872 and was buried in the Burns Mausoleum in the churchyard of St Michael's in Dumfries, Scotland.

'Betty' Burns was excluded from the 1844 festival and, as stated, her son Robert Thomson was rejected upon trying to greet his grandfather's sons, his uncles, at the Ayr Festival.

Robert Burns junior, together with his brothers William Nicol and James Glencairn, was made an Honorary Member of the Lodge St James on 9 August 1844 at a meeting held in the old Cross Keys Inn at Tarbolton.

In 1859 William gave the reply to the 'Immortal Memory' at the Centenary Banquet held in the City Hall in Glasgow at which there were twenty-three toasts and fifteen replies. He spoke at several other events that year in commemoration of the centenary of his father's birth.

=== Burns House, Dumfries ===
In 1851 William purchased the family's last home in Millhole Street, later Burns Street, Dumfries in order to ensure the survival of the house in which his father had died and the Burns family had resided. In 1858 William placed the house in the care of the Dumfries and Maxwellton Education Society and for a number of years it served as a 'Ragged School' where children were taught a trade if they came from destitute or neglected backgrounds. After the school moved to other premises the Dumfries and Galloway Royal Infirmary directors restored the house as a memorial to Robert Burns and from 25 January 1935 it was opened to the public. Jean Armour Burns Brown, William's great-niece, performed the opening ceremony.

== See also ==
- Agnes Burns (aunt)
- Annabella Burns (aunt)
- Isabella Burns (aunt)
- John Burns (uncle)
- Gilbert Burns (uncle)
- William Burns (uncle)
- Francis Wallace Burns (brother)
- Elizabeth Riddell Burns (sister)
- James Glencairn Burns (brother)
