= Kate Kemp =

Poet's muse

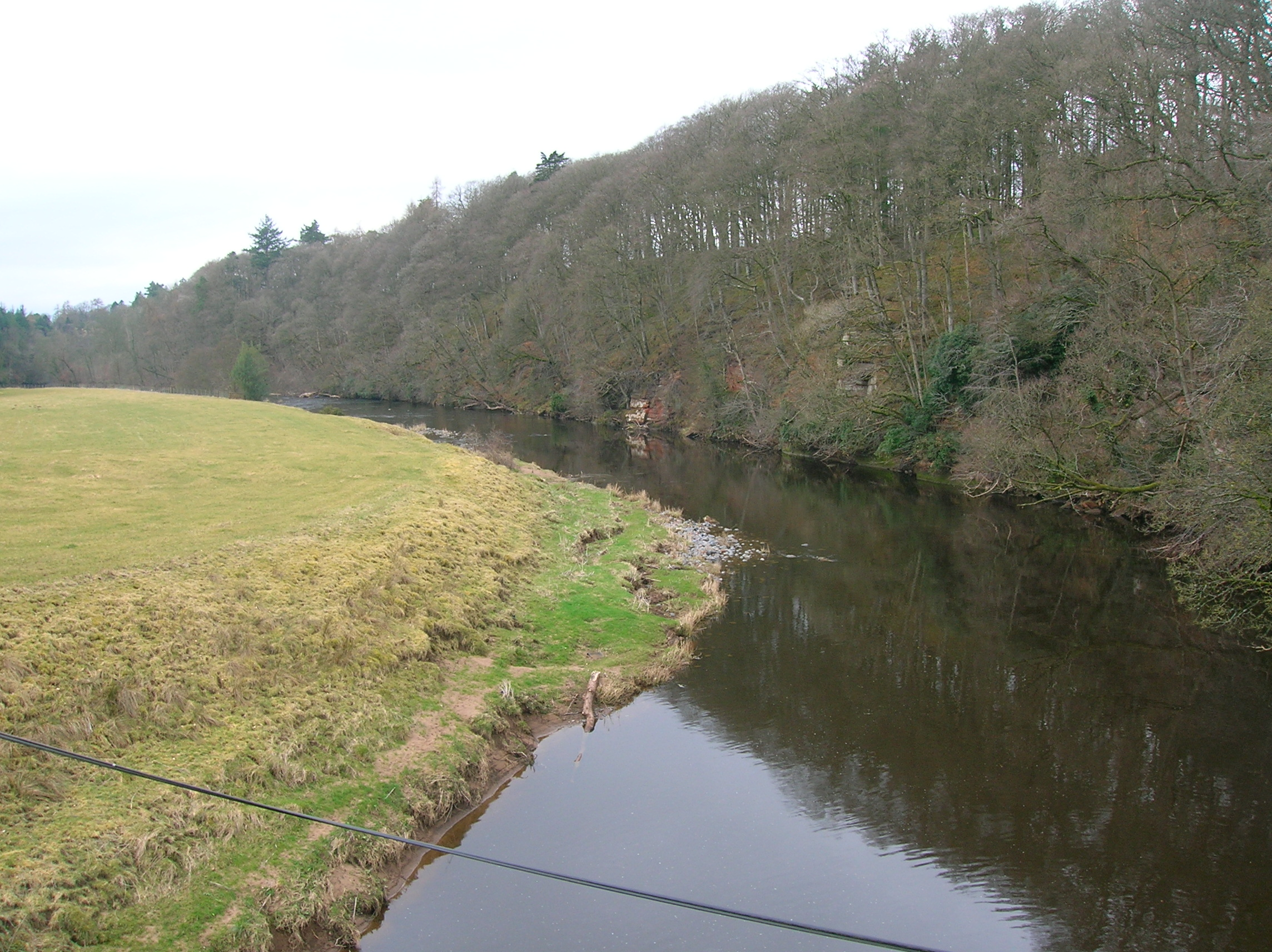
- The Miller's Holm from Bridge House
- Born: Circa 1760; Ayrshire
- Occupations: Dairymaid and carer

Kate Kemp of Barskimming lived with her father at the Bridge House on the northern side of the single-span Barskimming Old Bridge (Barskimming Auld Brig), River Ayr, Scotland. Both Robert Burns and James Andrew, the miller at Barskimming Mill, had a romantic interest in her, and one visit led to the composition of the poem and dirge "Man was made to Mourn".

== Life and character ==
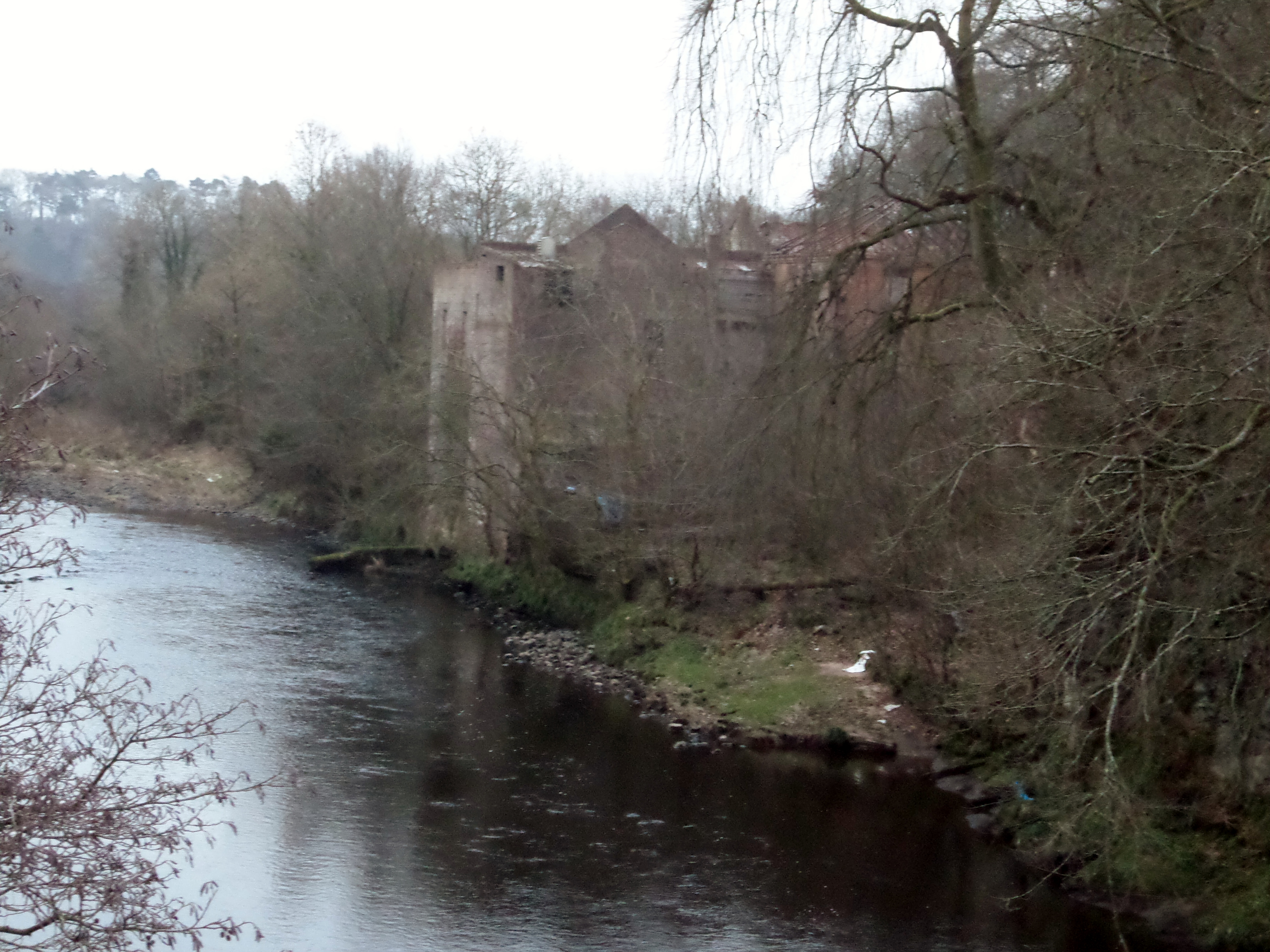
Barskimming Mill from the old bridge.

Her father may have been the James Kemp of Barskimming who is recorded in the Parish of Stair as the father of William Kemp, who was baptised on 19 August 1766 being around eighteen in 1784. No other "Kemp" births are recorded around this time; however, in 1781, a Margaret Kemp from Mauchline came to live in the parish of Stewarton with a "clearance certificate" of good character. Kate lived in a sylvan and rural location at the old Barskimming Bridge or Kemp's House (NS4906525460) that lay on the north or Mauchline side of the road to Stair about two miles south of the town centre, demolished sometime after 1861. Kemp was a unique surname in the parishes of Mauchline and Stair at the time of Burns, suggesting that the family were not local in origin. Old Kemp's daughter is described as having been a trim trig lass, one of the leading belles of the district, and it is recorded that Burns had an e'e to Kate.

Kate lived with her elderly and disabled father who had a slight paralysis, and on the recorded occasion of one evening visit by Robert Burns and James Andrew, she was not at home because she was out in the fields looking for a cow that had wandered, resulting in her competing admirers having, as it turned out, productive time on their hands whilst awaiting her return. Wilson records from a "correspondent" who recalled the words of James Andrew, miller of Barskimming Mill, that Kate's father was "... not originally possessed of the best of tempers, was rendered peevish and querulous by disease and in consequence of slight paralysis, generally supported himself on two sticks".

== Association with Robert Burns ==
Bridge House, Barskimming

One evening, Robert Burns walked from his then-new home at Mossgiel down to the Barskimming Bridge House that lay next to the River Ayr with the intention of courting Kate who had caught his eye as a "trim trig lass". Kate's distressed father explained that one of their cattle was lost and that Kate was away searching for it, adding that she had been away so long that he was afraid that she was lost as well. Burns decided to go for a walk on the Bridge or Miller's Holm in the hope that Kate would return with the lost cow.

The first verse of the poem "Man is Made to Mourn" seems to reflect Burns's meeting with "Old Kemp"—

"When chill November's surly blast,
Made fields and forests bare.
One ev'ning, as I wand'red forth;
Along the banks of Aire"
I spy'd a man, whose age and step"
Seem'd weary, worn with care;"
His face was furrow'd o'er with years,"
And hoary was his hair."

At the Stair end of the bridge, Burns encountered James Andrew, and the conversation that ensued went as follows: "Weel miller, what are you doing here?" "Na, Robin," said the miller, "I s'ould put that question to you, for I am at home and ye'are no." "Why," said Robin, "I cam doun to see Kate Kemp." "I was just gaun the same gate," said the miller. "Then ye need gang nae further," said Burns, "fur baith her and the cow's lost and the old man is perfectly wud at the want o'them. But come, we'll tak' a turn or two in the holm till we see if she cast up."

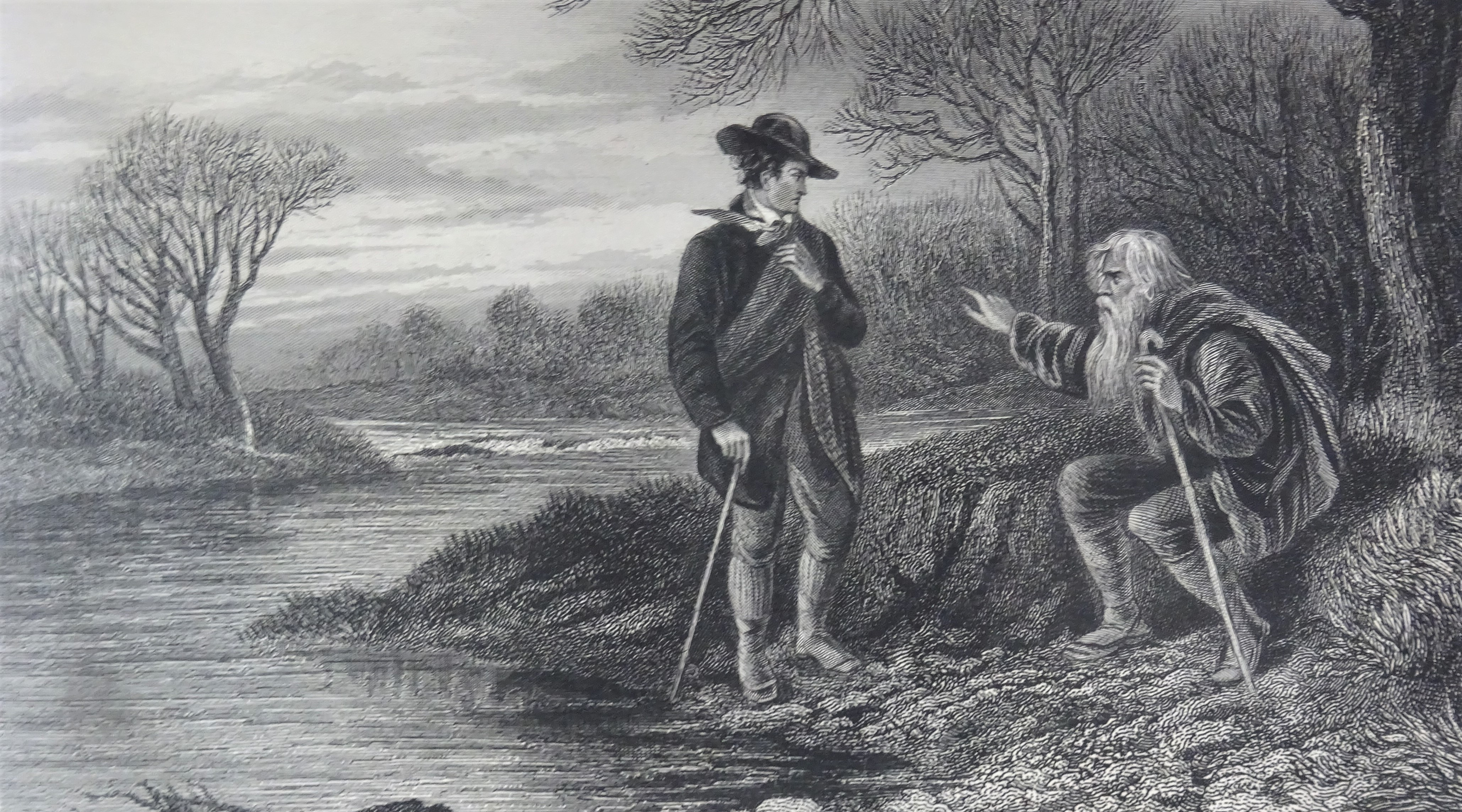
Man was made to Mourn depiction.

James Andrew was content to accompany his competitor for Kate's affections, and at first they were both involved in a cheerful discourse; however, at length Burns fell into a deep and silent ruminations, and after a while the friends silently parted. Some days later they met up again and Burns apologised to James for giving the impression that he had not enjoyed his company that evening on the holm; however, the miller explained that he had guessed that Burns was engrossed in the composition of a poem. Robert read out his new work and also gave James a copy of the poetry that the occasion had created and this was how it is said that "Man was Made to Mourn" came finally and fully into existence. The holm at that time was planted with lime and chestnut trees planted by Sir Thomas Miller of Barskimming.

The Burns family had moved to Mossgiel or Mossgaville from Lochlea near Tarbolton in March 1784, and Robert is recorded to have written "Man is Made to Mourn" in 1784, so his courtship of Kate Kemp must have been in that year. He met Jean Armour in April 1785, so he may have ceased his attempts at courtship by then.

James Andrew, born 1765, son of Robert, was the miller at the nearby Barskimming Mill for many years, and it is yet to be ascertained if his interest in courting Kate met with the desired success. His family continued living and working at the mill until his grandson, also James, sold it to William Alexander. James was buried in the cemetery at Stair Parish Church with a cast iron memorial made by Smith's Patent Sun Foundry.

The dirge is most famous for the line "Man's inhumanity to man":

Man was made to mourn: A Dirge

Many and sharp the num'rous ills
Inwoven with our frame!
More pointed still we make ourselves
Regret, remorse, and shame!
And man, whose heav'n-erected face
The smiles of love adorn, –
Man's inhumanity to man
Makes countless thousands mourn!

== Barskimming Old Bridge and the Bridge House ==
Known locally as Kemp's House in Burns's time it was the property of Sir William Miller in 1857 and was occupied by his tenant Alexander Kerr. It was described in 1855 as "A good Cottage at the North end of the County Bridge on the Turnpike Road from Mauchline to Ayr."

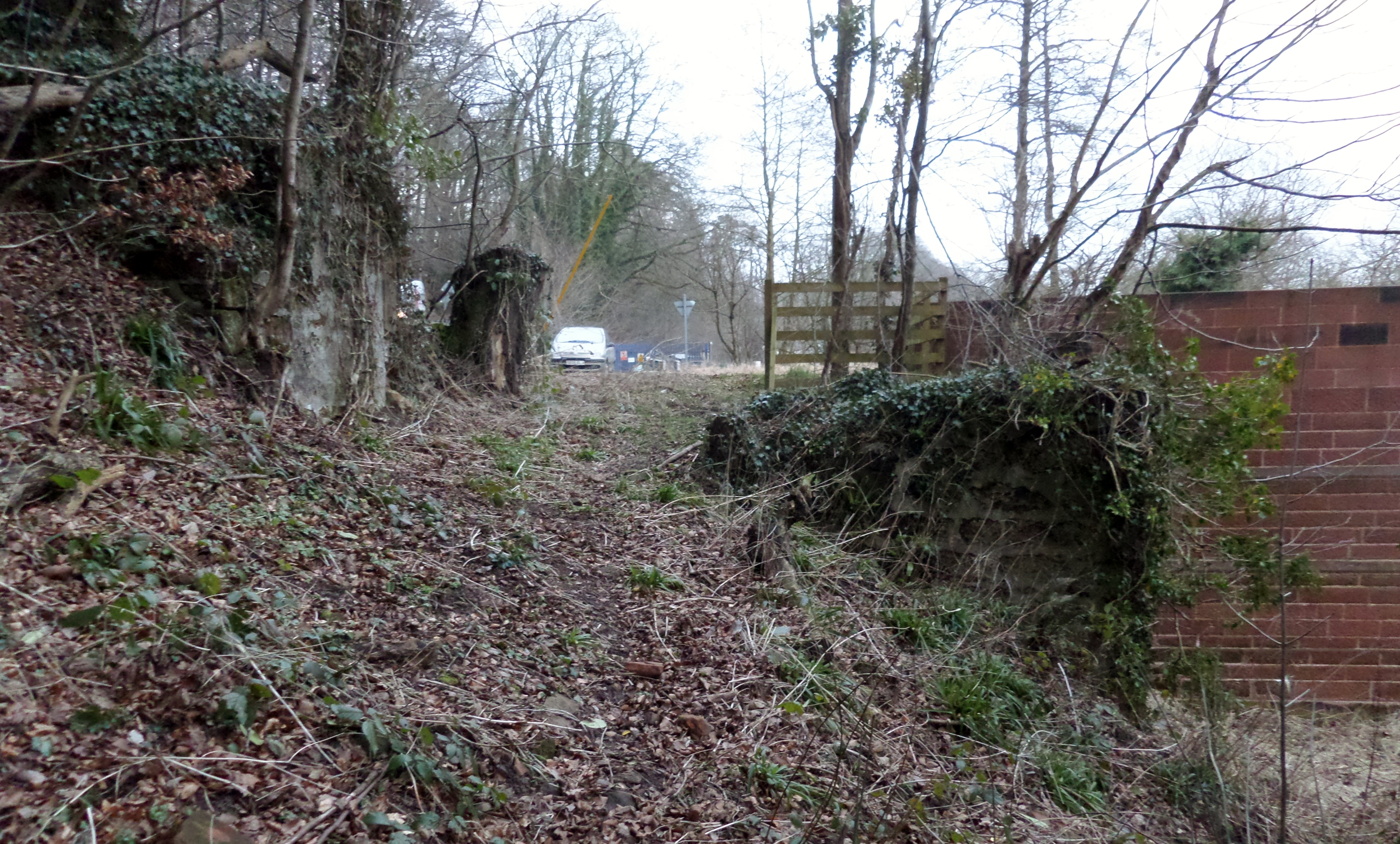
The ruins of Bridge House.

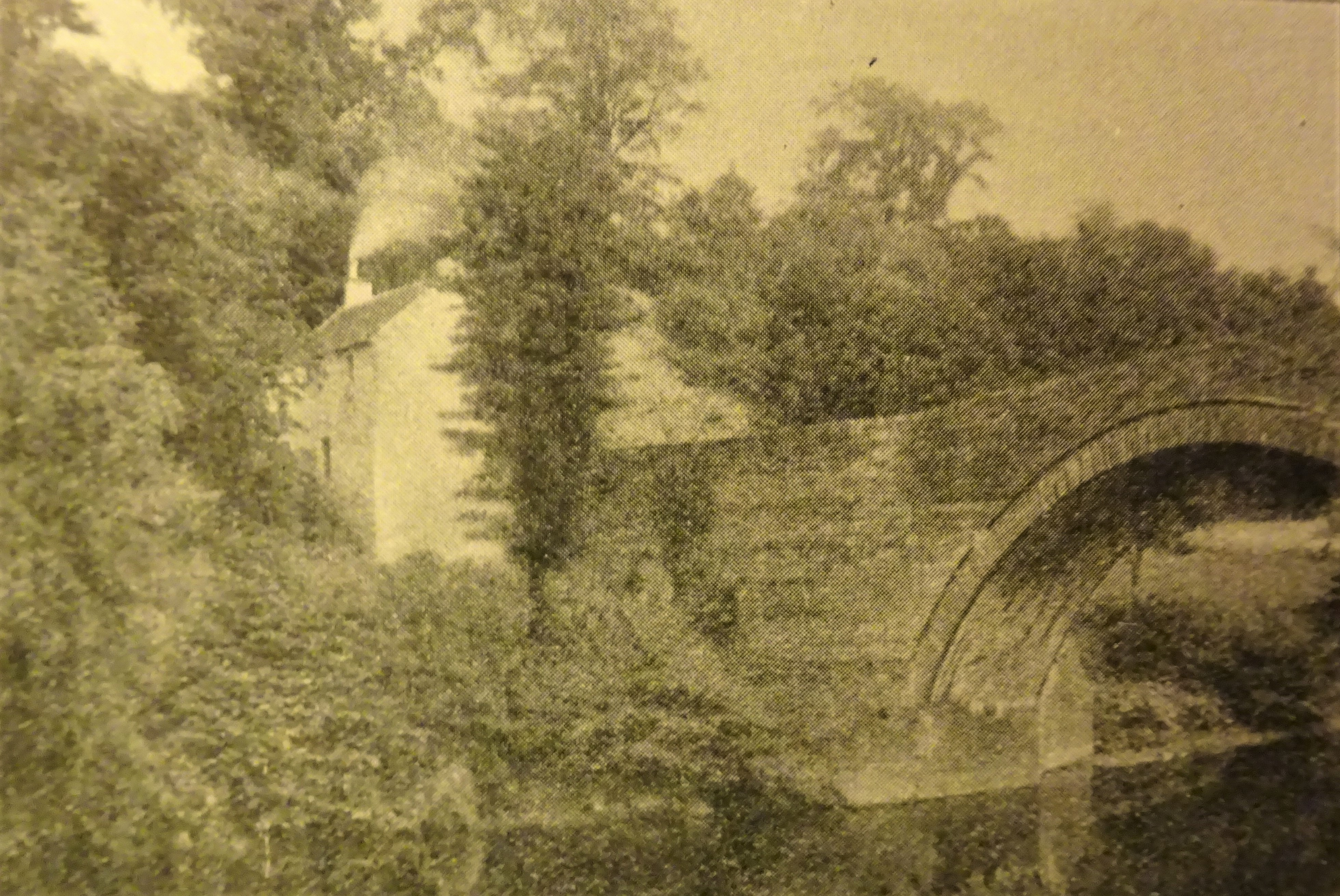
Kate Kemp's home and Old Barskimming Bridge in 1896.

The two-storey house may have been contemporary with Barskimming Old Bridge that dates from the 17th century, originally thatched but later slated. Steps beside it led into the woods where a path led through the Sandwalk Plantation down towards Barskimming House. Kate's home seems to have been built in conjunction with the bridge as a sort of lodge or toll collectors house. Considerable trouble had been expended in building a substantial level stone plinth for the house in this awkward and space restricted position. The 1841 Census records a "Barskimming Bridge End" with James Reid, gardener, and a family of four living at the property. The 1881 census did not record the property. A photograph of circa 1947 shows the house in good condition and the cave with a door.

An unusual feature at the site is an artificial cave with a door that has been cut into the red sandstone. Several other caves exist in the area, and it is recorded that it was in use as a dairy in 1879. Next to the bridge on the southern bank was the Bridge or Miller's Holm where those who lived at the restricted site of Kemp's House nestling under the red sandstone cliffs kept their cows.

The Barskimming Auld Brig was noted in 1715 as "..too was often in need of repair and improvement, for instance in 1776 by building a new arch seven foot lower and two foot wider than the former arch, by which instead of a dangerous and almost impassable bridge, the public had got a safe bridge and of easy passage as any in the country."

In 1838, it is recorded that the bridge parapet was pushed off to allow the passage of a number of wide vehicles; however, no prosecution took place, as the bridge did not conform with the "Road Act".

== Micro-history ==
Lord Barskimming and later Lord Glenlee, who was originally known as Sir Thomas Miller of Glenlee, was the owner of the Barskimming Estate at the time of the Kemp's residence at Bridge House and the brother of Patrick Miller of Dalswinton, who was Burns's landlord when he lived at Ellisland Farm.

== See also ==
- Jean Armour
- Alison Begbie or Elizabeth Gebbie
- Nelly Blair
- May Cameron
- Mary Campbell (Highland Mary)
- Jenny Clow
- Nelly Kilpatrick
- Jessie Lewars
- Ann Park
- Peggy Thompson
