= The Marriage of Robin Redbreast and the Wren =

Children's story told by Robert Burns

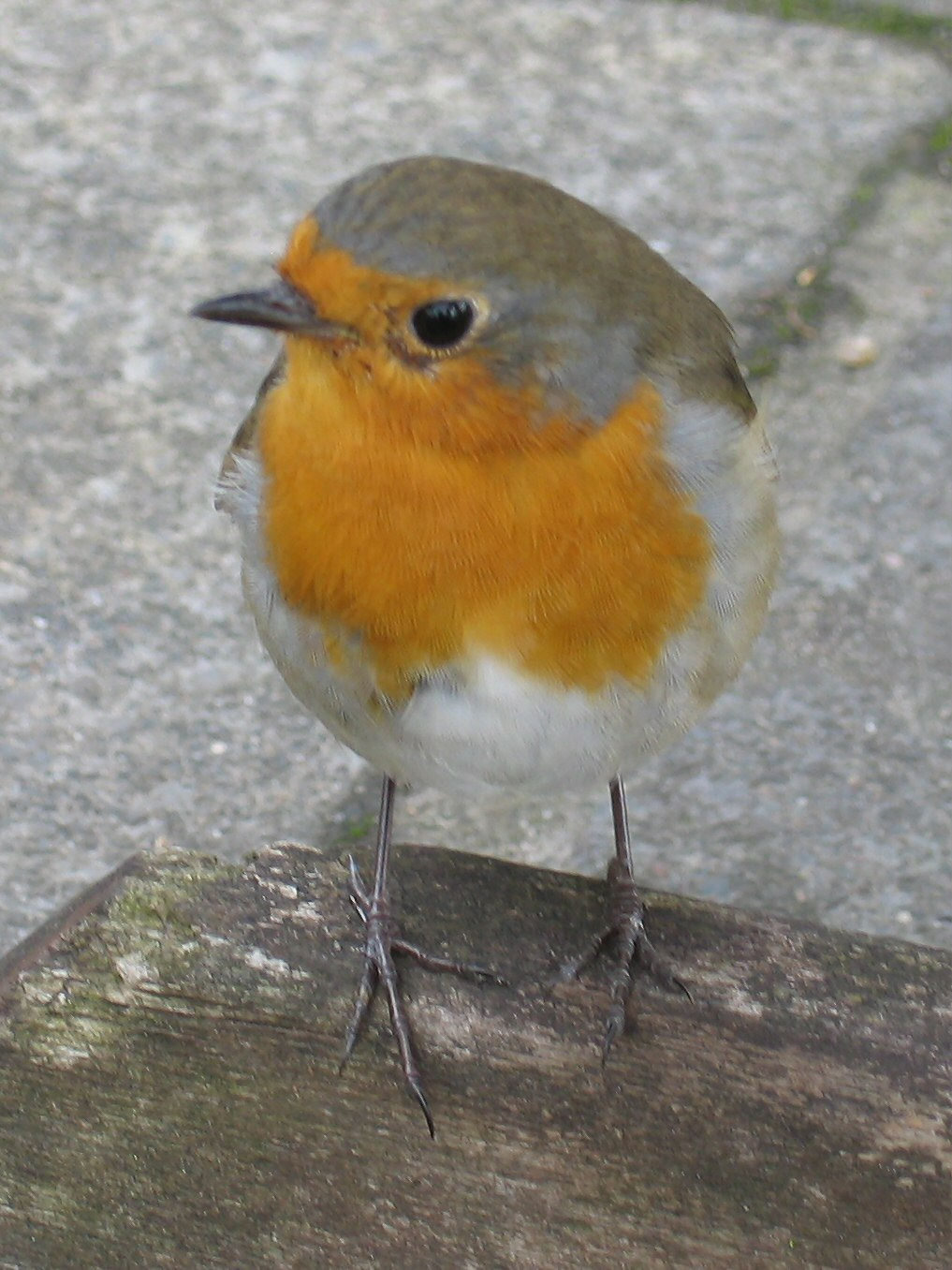
- A Scottish Robin
- Author: Robert Burns
- Language: Scots & English
- Publication place: Great Britain

The recorded source of the children's story "The Marriage of Robin Redbreast and the Wren" is Isabella Burns, later Mrs Isabella Burns Begg, the youngest sister of Robert Burns. Isabella recalled that her brother, Robert Burns, was the author and that he was in the habit of telling the tale to entertain the younger members of his family at their farm in Ayrshire, such as herself, Annabella, John and William. This nursery tale was first published by Robert Chambers in his Popular Rhymes of Scotland (originally published in 1826).

== History of the story ==
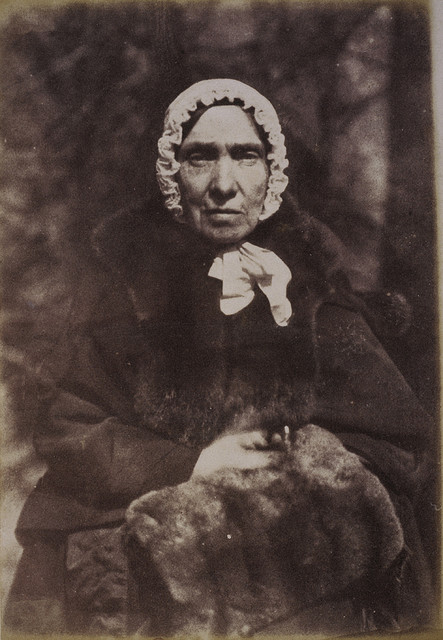
Isabella Burns

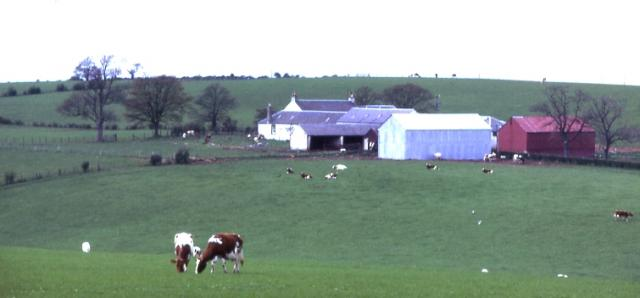
Lochlea Farm

Chambers was also the author of the four-volume The Life and Works of Burns published in 1851 and for this work he had been in contact with Isabella between 1847 and 1850, who recalled that Burns, a teenager at the time, composed the story "The Marriage of Robin Redbreast and the Wren" for the entertainment of his young siblings and was in the habit of telling it whilst the family lived at Lochlea Farm near Tarbolton; his father was the tenant of the farm between 1777 and 1784.

The story of the 'marriage' is neither a song nor a poem and no copies of it written by Robert Burns are known to have existed and therefore the work does not usually appear in his biographies or in many Burns-related books. The Saltire Society, a membership organisation which aims to promote the understanding of the culture and heritage of Scotland, have published several editions of 'The Marriage of Robin Redbreast and the Wren' in the form of a chapbook. It is included in the 1965 edition of Stories that never grow old, edited by Watty Piper and illustrated by George and Doris Hauman. Video versions have been produced (see External Links). Griffith and Farran published Robin's Yule Song in 1860.

Burns and his siblings would have been very familiar with wrens and robins at Lochlea and they are mentioned in some of his poems and the song 'The Robin cam to the wrens nest' as recalled and recited by Jean Armour. The scenario of a robin and a wren marrying is an ancient one, dating back to around 1400. The nursery rhyme "The Marriage of Cock Robin and Jenny Wren" is a more recent example however as stated no record of Robert Burns's specific inspiration is known to exist.

As stated Isabella Burns is the source of the story that she heard as a young child and it wasn't until she was around eighty years of age in 1850 that she recounted it to Chambers, so the exact wording of the story is open to some doubt, rather than the general outline of the tale.

=== Story outline ===
The story, in Scots the "Robin Reidbreist and the Wran" tells the tale of a robin redbreast who sets out to sing a Yuletide song to the King and on the way he wisely avoids a series of would be predators and a boy who would have killed him. The robin's song so entrances the king and his queen that they decide to reward him with their pet wren for a bride and the entire court dances and sings at their wedding festivities after which the robin and his new wife return to his home.

== The Tale of the Marriage of Robin Redbreast and the Wren ==
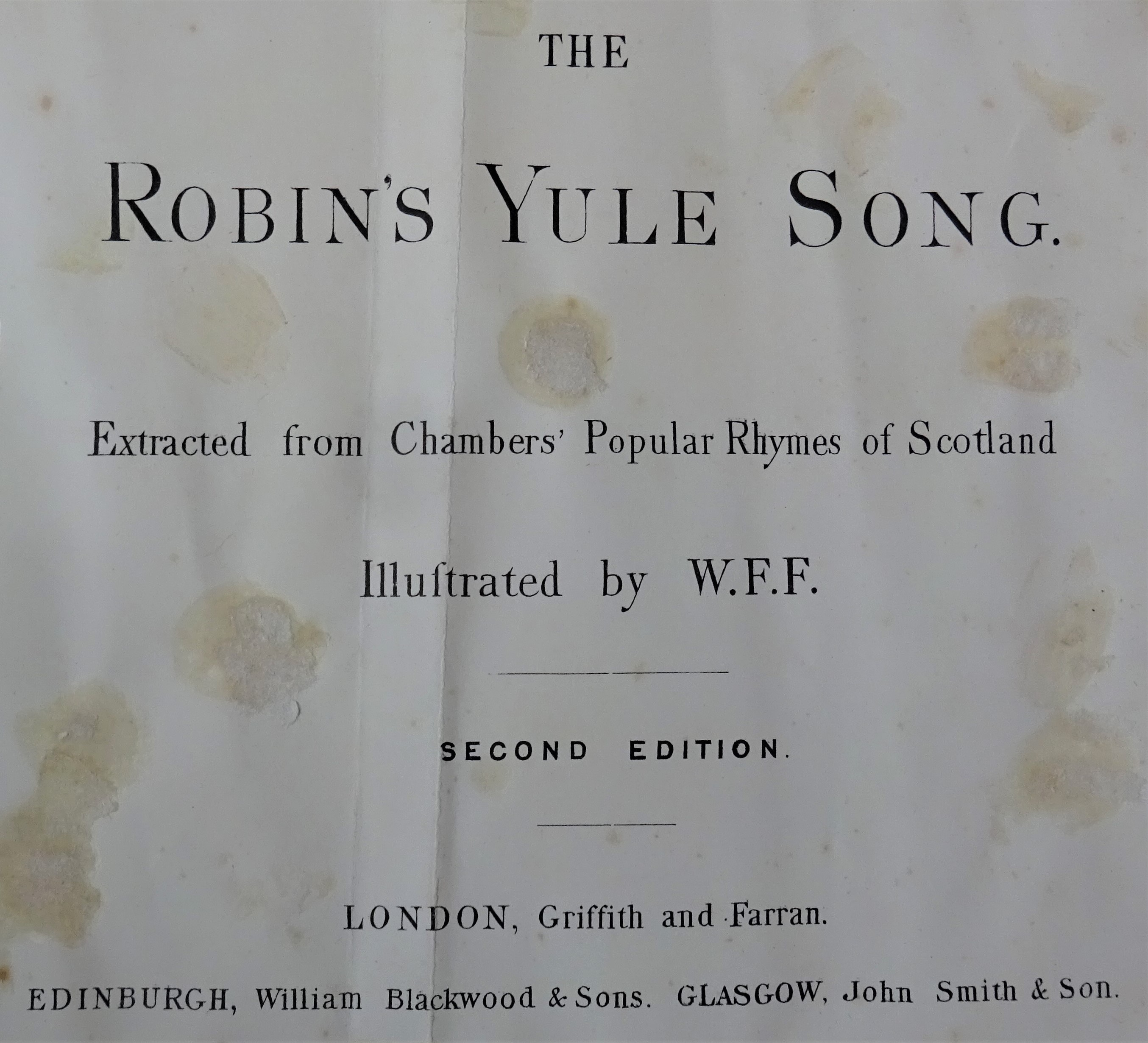
Title page of The Robin's Yule Song (1860) Griffith & Farran. London

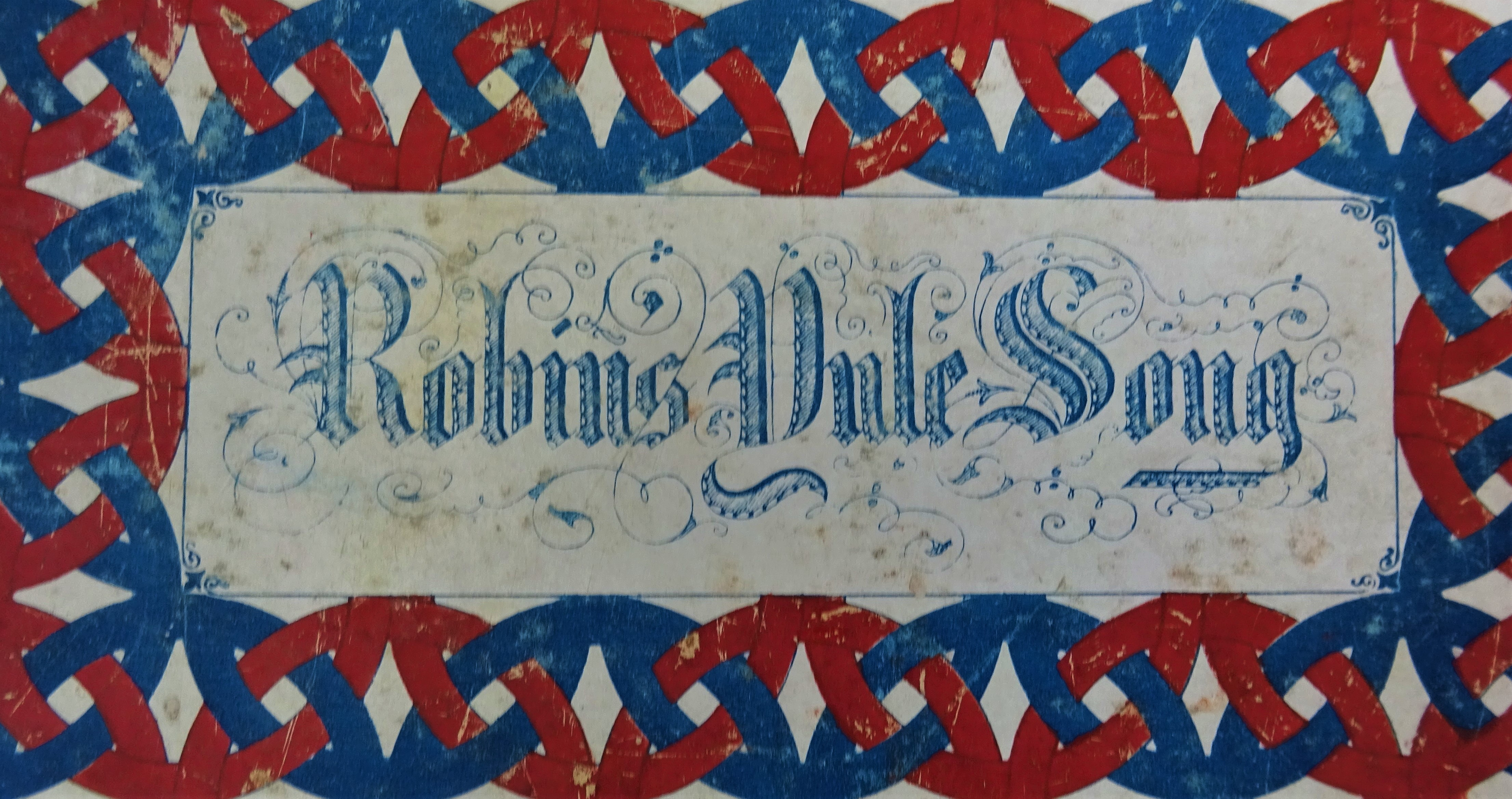
The Robin's Yule Song cover

There was an auld grey Poussie Baudrons (cat), and she gaed awa’ down by a water-side, and there she saw a wee Robin Redbreast happin’ on a brier; and Poussie Baudrons says: "Where’s tu gaun, wee Robin?" And wee Robin says: "I’m gaun awa’ to the king to sing him a sang this guid Yule morning." And Poussie Baudrons says: "Come here, wee Robin, and I’ll let you see a bonny white ring round my neck." But wee Robin says: "Na, na! grey Poussie Baudrons; na, na! Ye worry’t the wee mousie but ye’se no worry me."

So wee Robin flew awa’ till he came to a fail fauld-dike, and there he saw a grey greedy gled (hawk) sitting. And grey greedy gled says: "Where’s tu gaun, wee Robin?" And wee Robin says: "I’m gaun’ to the king to sing him a sang this guid Yule morning." And grey greedy gled says: "Come here, wee Robin, and I’ll let you see a bonny feather in my wing." But wee Robin says: "Na, na! grey greedy gled; na, na! Ye pookit (plucked) a’ the wee lintie (linnet); but ye’se no pook me."

So wee Robin flew an’ till be came to the cleuch (gorge) o’ a craig and there he saw slee Tod Lowrie (fox) sitting. And slee Tod Lowrie says: "Where’s tu gaun, wee Robin?" And wee Robin says: "I’m gaun awa’ to the king to sing him a sang this guid Yule morning." And slee Tod Lowrie says: "Come here, wee Robin, and I’ll let ye see a bonny spot on the tap o’ my tail". But wee Robin says: "Na, na! slee Tod Lowrie; Na, na! Ye worry’t (savaged) the wee lammie (lamb); but ye’se no worry me."

So wee Robin flew awa’ till he came to a bonny burn-side, and there he saw a wee callant (boy) sitting. And the wee callant says: "Where’s tu gaun, wee Robin?" And wee Robin says: "I’m gaun awa’ to the king to sing him a sang this guid Yule morning." And the wee callant says: "Come here, wee Robin, and I’ll gie ye a wheen grand moolins (crumbs) out o’ my pooch." But wee Robin says: "Na, na! wee callant; na, na! Ye speldert (ripped apart) the gowdspink (goldfinch); but ye’se no spelder me."

So wee Robin flew awa’ till he came to the king, and there he sat on a winnock sole (window sill) and sang the king a bonny sang. And the king says to the queen: "What’ll we gie to wee Robin for singing us this bonny sang?" And the queen says to the king: "I think we’ll gie him the wee wran to be his wife."

So wee Robin and the wee wran were married, and the king, and the queen, and a’ the court danced at the waddin’; syne he flew awa’ hame to his ain water-side, and happit on a brier.

== See also ==
- Robert Burns's Commonplace Book 1783–1785
- Glenriddell Manuscripts
- Poems, Chiefly in the Scottish Dialect (Edinburgh Edition)
- Robert Burns's Interleaved Scots Musical Museum
- The Geddes Burns
