= Isabella Burns =

Youngest sister of the poet Robert Burns

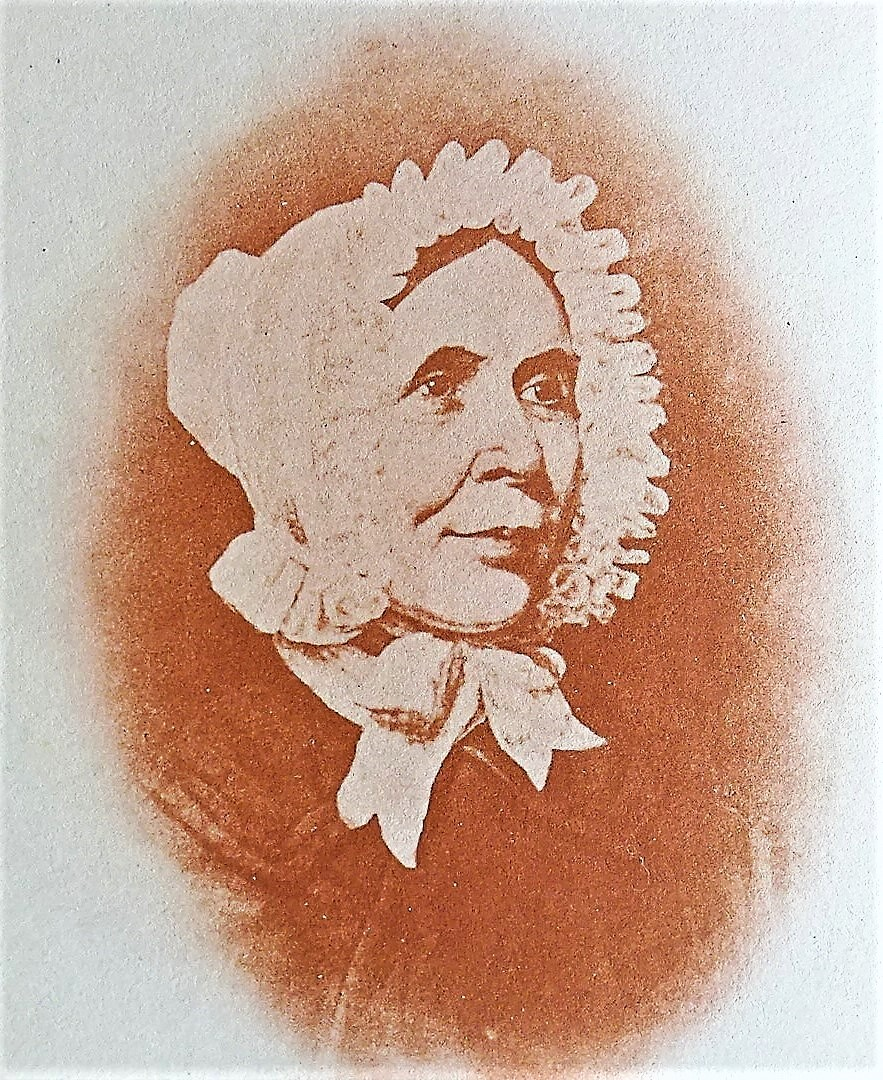
- Isabella at the age of 77
- Born: 27 June 1771; Mount Oliphant, Scotland
- Died: 4 December 1858 (aged 87); Bridgehouse Cottage, Ayr, Scotland
- Occupations: Housewife, teacher
- Spouse: John Begg
- Children: 9
- Parent(s): William Burnes; Agnes Broun

Isabella Burns (Isabella Begg) (1771–1858) or Isobel Burns (Isobel Begg) was the youngest sister of the poet Robert Burns, born to William Burness and Agnes Broun at Mount Oliphant Farm on the 27 June 1771 and christened on 2 July 1771 by Rev. William McGill, a friend of her father. When she died she was the last member of Robert Burns's immediate family and when living at Bridge House in Alloway for the last sixteen years of her life she entertained many visitors who were interested in his life and works. She was the source of many published insights into Burns's life, character and loves. Her siblings knew her as 'Isbal'.

== Life and background ==
Her sisters were Agnes and Annabella whilst her brothers were Robert, Gilbert, John and William.

When at Lochlea, Robert Chambers records from her own words "Her main occupation was one suited to her tender years – that of tending the cattle in the field. Her father would often visit her, sit down by her side, and tell her the names of the various grasses and wild flowers, as if to lose no opportunity of imparting instruction. When it thundered she was sure he would come to her, because he knew that on such occasions she was apt to suffer from terror."

She recalled that her mother sang sweetly and had a great fund of ballads and songs, this being a significant influence on Robert. She also emphasised how considerate and supportive she was to her husband.

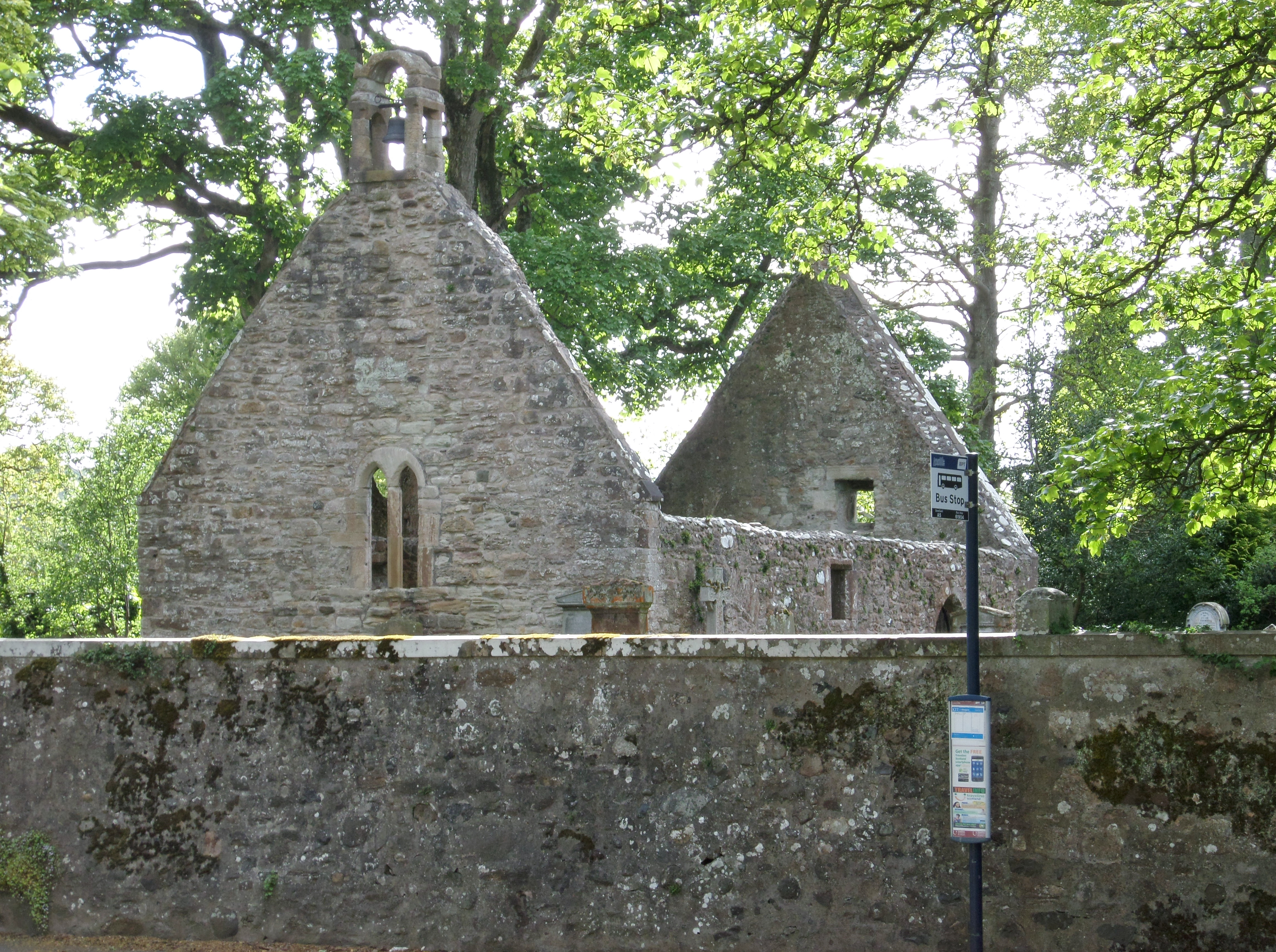
Alloway 'Auld' Kirk ruins.

After her father's death the family moved to Mossgiel Farm where she lived and worked for nine years.

Isabella remembered her sister Annabella taking her to dance at age 11 with Matthew Paterson at Tarbolton's Bacherlors' Club after his intended partner failed to turn up. She had been at a sewing class in the village.

Gilbert and Isabella are regarded as being very articulate and having a literacy propensity far above the average. John Wilson of Tarbolton of Dr Hornbook fame was her teacher for a brief period.

Robert Bowie from Stewarton became a merchant in Kilmarnock and for some time he courted Isabella however nothing came of it and he never married.

In August 1788 Annabella and Isabella were present at the birth of Burns's second son, Francis Wallace, at Ellisland Farm on 18 August 1788.

At the age of 22 Isabella married John Begg at Mossgiel Farm and after a few years the Begg family moved to Dinning Farm in Closeburn Parish, Nithsdale in 1800, after Gilbert Burns moved from there to Morham Mains in East Lothian. In 1810 the lease expired and John Begg became the land steward for Mr James Hope Vere MP on his estate at Blackwood in Lanarkshire.

On 24 April 1813, after nearly three years at Blackwood, John met his death when his horse reared and fell on him, crushing him to death. He was returning from his regular trip to Lesmahagow market on a horse that he had been asked to ride because it had become fractious due to lack of exercise. Isabella was left a widow with nine children with ages from three to eighteen.

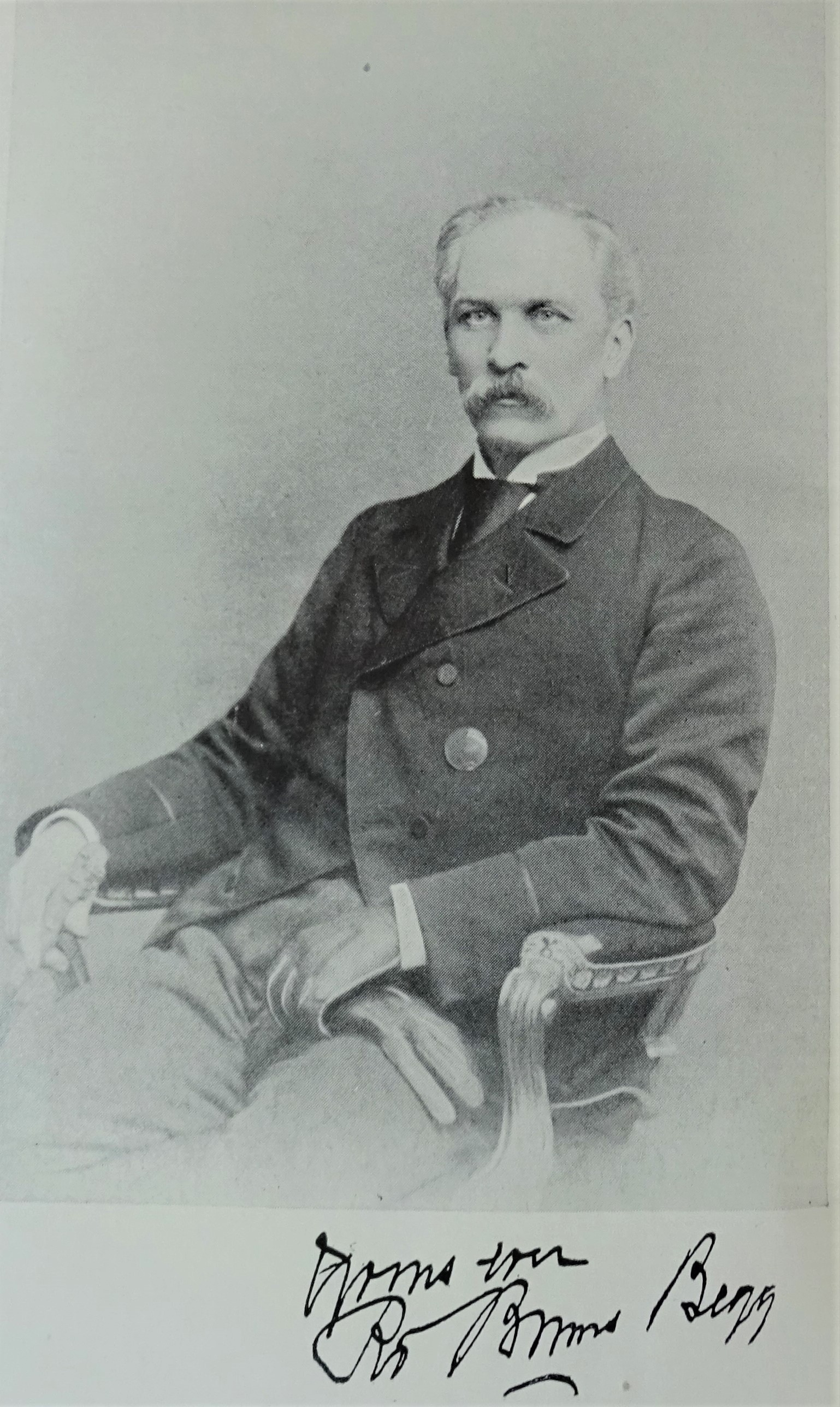
Robert Burns Begg wrote the 'Memoir of Isobel Begg'.

For a while Mr James Hope Vere paid her a small annual grant however to make ends meet she opened a dame's school in Kirkmuirhill which she ran for four years. William had qualified for the University of Edinburgh to study for medicine however lack of funds forced him to enter the teaching profession and after working at Dalmeny Academy he became the parish schoolmaster at Ormiston in East Lothian. The whole family moved to Ormiston where Isabella again ran a school. She later moved to nearby Tranent when William resigned his post and supported her family with the help of Agnes and Isabella, working as dressmakers. William had emigrated in 1834 and Jane died in July 1822, followed by Edward in March 1824.

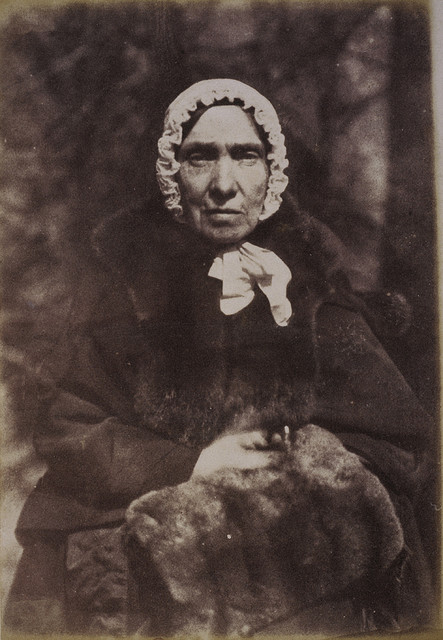
Isabella Burns

Robert Burns Begg, her son, was able to obtain an annuity for his mother which she benefitted from for a number of years, relinquishing it when her circumstances improved.

In 1842 Robert Chambers and others secured an income for Isabella, Queen Victoria granting her a pension. in 1843 Dr Chambers also acquired for he the lifetime use of a picturesque cottage on the Belleisle estate on banks of the River Doon.

In 1843 the family moved back to Ayrshire and in her final years she lived at Bridge House, Alloway in a small thatched cottage where she died aged eighty-five in 1858. The house no longer stands having been demolished in the 1890s. It was located quite near to the main entrance to Belleisle House and was named after the bridge over the Slaphouse Burn.

In 1846 Isabella and her daughters met the Abolitionist leader Frederick Douglass who had been inspired by Robert Burns and made a special visit to Alloway and recorded the warmth of his welcome in the Narrative of the Life of Frederick Douglass, an American Slave.

=== Family ===
As stated, at the age of 22 Isabella married John Begg at Mossgiel Farm on 9 December 1793 and they lived there for seven years. He was an orphan and had been raised by his uncle, a Mr Campbell of Roughdyke Farm in Sorn parish. He is described as a "quarrier in Mossgiel" in the marriage register.

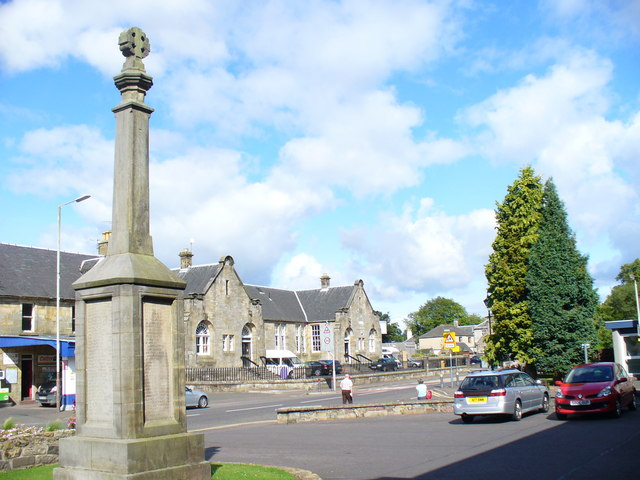
Kinross

Isabella had nine children, three girls and six boys: William (1794–1864), Robert Burns (1798–1876), John (1796–1867), Agnes Brown (1800–1883), Gilbert Burns (1801–1885), Jane Breckenridge (1804–1822), Isabella (1806–1886), James Hope (1808–1840) and Edward Hamilton (1811–1824).

William died in Canada after emigrating to America in 1834. Robert Burns on 24 July 1825 married Grace Beveridge in Kinross. He had been a teacher at Dalmeny Academy and became the schoolmaster of Kinross parish and died aged 80 in the schoolhouse. Agnes Brown and Isabella never married, both dying at Bridge House.

Gilbert Burns Begg was a Petty Officer in the Royal Navy, serving at Navarino and in the Crimea. James Hope Begg had been a baker's apprentice however he left and joined the 26th Regiment and served in India from 1829 to 1840 however he regiment were sent to China where he was killed on 2 November 1840. John died at Kilmarnock on 11 April 1867. Her son Gilbert Burns Begg is buried in Pollokshaws in the Vennel or Kirk Lane Cemetery and her son John Begg is buried in the Glasgow Southern Necropolis.

Her daughters Agnes and Isabella are buried next to their mother in the old kirkyard at Alloway.

Isabella kept in touch with Ann Park's illegitimate daughter Elizabeth 'Betty' Burns who had been brought up by Jean Armour and had married. None of Robert Burns's letters to Isabella are known to survive.

== Association with Robert Burns ==
Isabella's religious education was partly taught at home by his father, using the A Manual of Religious Belief that William Burnes had written for that purpose, assisted by John Murdoch. Her siblings had been taught with the same manual.

Isabella was the source of many published insights into her brother's life and loves, in particular she is the sole authority for Burns's first love being Nelly Kilpatrick although she was only around three years of age at the time and up until then Nelly Blair had been the accepted name of the lady concerned. Isabella identified 'Montgomerie's Peggy' as the housekeeper at Coilsfield House. She may have been 'Highland' Mary. Isabella Steven was identified with O Tibbie, I hae seen the day by Isabella. At times her recollections were manifestly wrong.

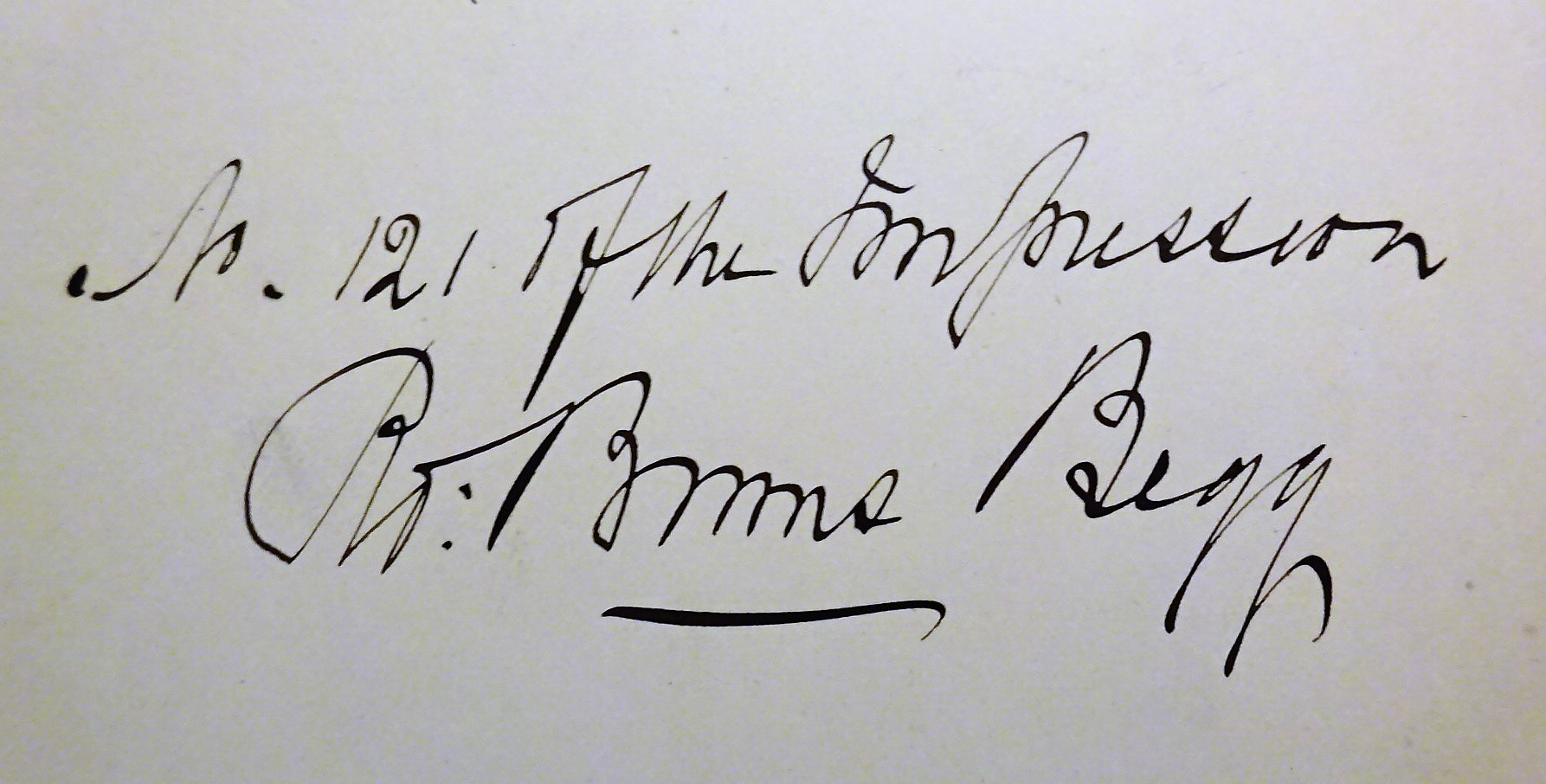
Signature of Robert Burns Begg, Isabella's grandson.

Memorably Isabella was the one who described the deathbed scene of her father on 13 February 1784 when he advised "..to walk in Virtue's paths and to shun every vice" and intimated that there was a member of his family whose future conduct he feared. Her brother Robert asked "Oh, father, is it me you mean?" His father said it was and Isabella recollected that he turned towards the window with tears streaming down his face and his chest heaving with barely suppressed emotion.

Isabella's daughter of the same name wrote to Dr Chambers and informed him that it was her Uncle Gilbert and his sisters who were set against Robert marrying Elizabeth Paton.

Isabella provided the name Alison Begbie, the lady who refused his marriage proposal, to the Burns biographer Robert Chambers when she herself was 76 years of age, recollecting events and details from when she was only 9 or 10 years old. Research by the author James Mackay suggests that 'Elison Begbie' was more likely to be a confused recollection of the name Elizabeth Gebbie, a surname which does appear in the Galston parish register.

For the four years that Burns remained at Mossgiel Farm he would ask Isabella to sing through the words of the songs he was composing and Isabella also recalled secretly reading the poems that Robert would write on a slate in his room after his mid-day meal having composed them in his head in the morning. Robert may have become aware of this as he starting using a simple code in parts of his compositions. Her brother died when she was twenty-five years old.

In the autumn of 1786, Isabella recalled the delivery of a letter that clearly caused Robert considerable distress and this is thought to be news of the death of 'Highland' Mary Campbell.

Whilst at Mount Oliphant or Lochlea Farm Robert wrote a story, The Marriage of Robin Redbreast and the Wren, for his young siblings which Isabella remembered and told to Dr Chambers in 1850/51. The story was published in Chambers's Nursery Rhymes of Scotland.

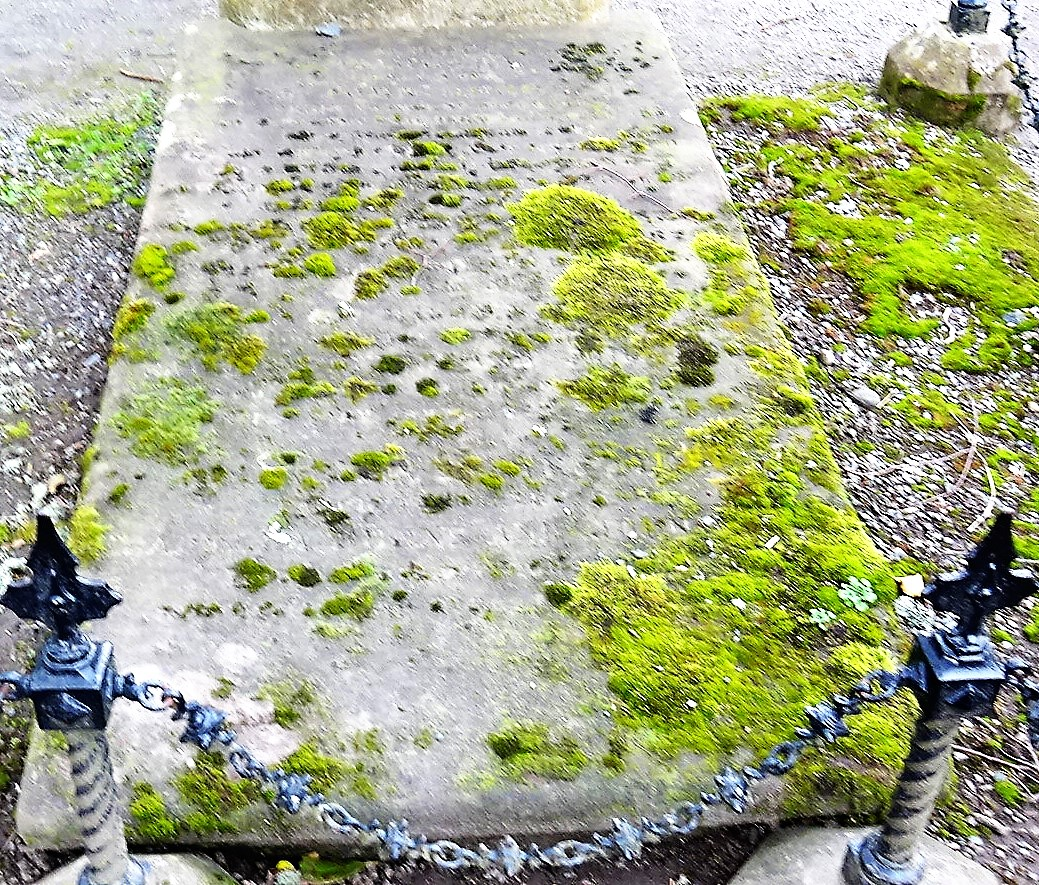
The grave of Isabella and her daughters Isabella and Agnes in Alloway Auld Kirk.

Isabella recalled that her youngest brother John died in 1783 and was buried at Kirk Alloway. It was said that when she was buried at the kirk the gravedigger exposed the bones of both her father and John. The Mauchline Kirk records however state that he died in 1785 and was buried in the Mauchline kirkyard.

On 10 June 1844 Isabella, now living in Ayrshire, was part of a family reunion in which her nephews Robert, William Nicol Burns and James Glencairn Burns met together on the banks of the Doon in what was a great public event with at least eighty thousand in attendance.

A jotting-book used to record simple transactions by William Burness also had records by Robert and Isabella was in the habit of cutting out sections of the jotter for souvenir hunters who visited her at her Belleisle home. She had inherited this from her mother of whom she recorded "My mother kept all she had of her father's writing with great care, she so venerated him as the best man she ever knew." The last remaining signature was sent to the New York Burns Club for the Burns Centenary in 1859 after a very special request.

She recalled that Robert never gained any proficiency with the fiddle or the German flute.

Robert Chambers donated the £300 profits from his 1851 four volume book The Life and Works of Robert Burns to Isabella's two daughters in order to secure their future financial security.

In 1891 Robert Burns Begg, Isabella's grandson, privately published for the family a Memoir of Isobel Burns, signed and numbered by him. In 1894 this was reprinted for general circulation. It is not clear why her name was shortened to 'Isobel' as she signed her letters 'Isabella', however her family knew her as 'Isbal'. The book was dedicated to his father and namesake, Robert Burns Begg.

In 1843 David Octavius Hill photographed her, when she was seventy-two. She was the only one of Robert Burns's siblings to be photographed.

William Taylor of Ayr painted a life-size half portrait of Isabella when she was seventy-seven a life-size half portrait of Isabella; another portrait had been painted earlier by William Bonnar of Edinburgh.

One time Confederate President Jefferson Davis visited Alloway and the Misses Begg invited him to tea. Upon arrival he found that they had put up his portrait in their cottage.

== See also ==
- Jean Armour
- Robert Burnes
- Gilbert Burns (farmer)
- William Burnes
- Agnes Broun
- Elizabeth 'Betty' Burns
