= Elizabeth 'Betty' Burns =

Daughter of the poet Robert Burns

Elizabeth Burns
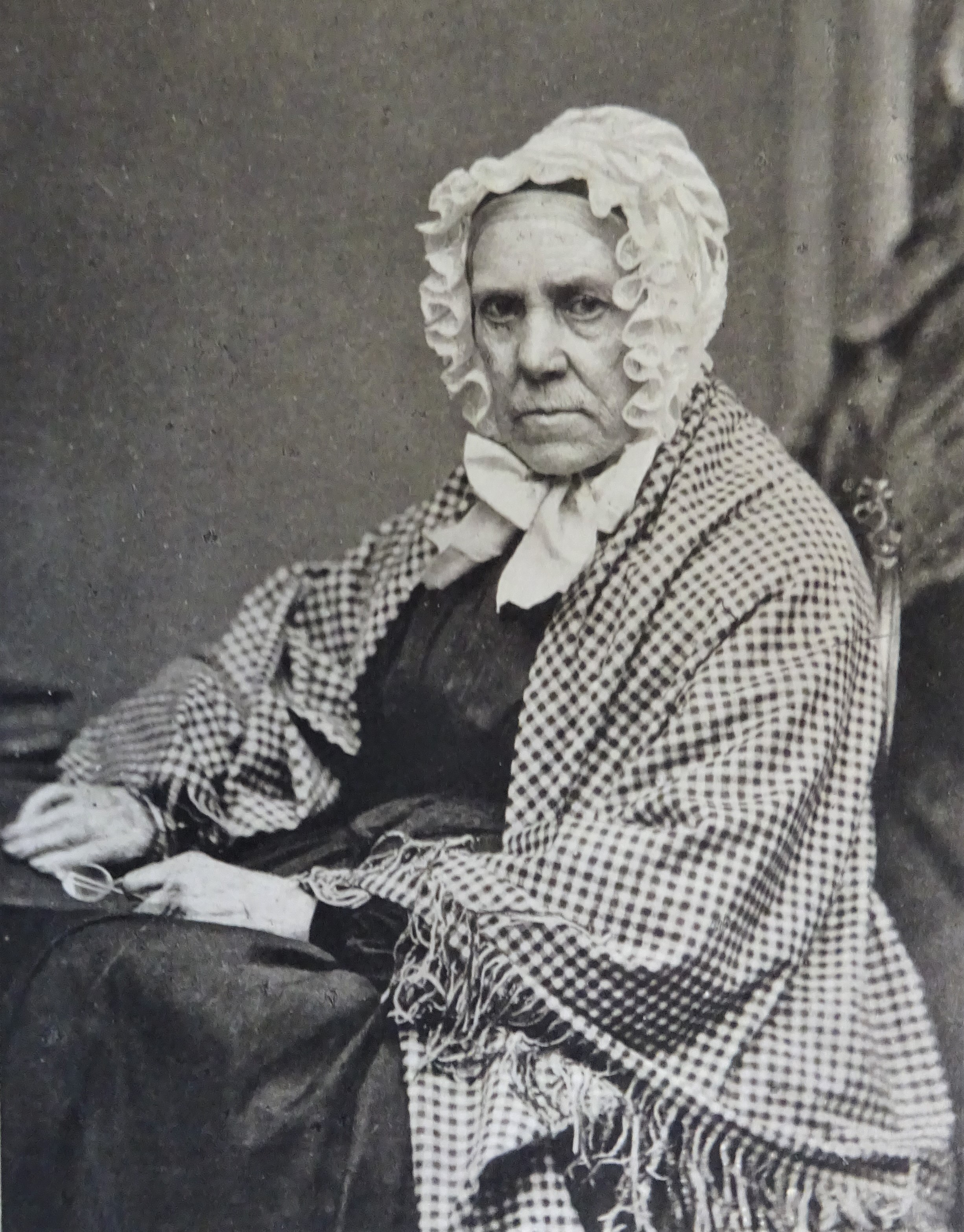
- Born: 31 March 1791; Leith, Scotland
- Died: 13 June 1873 (aged 82); Crossmyloof, Scotland
- Occupation: Housewife

Elizabeth Burns, Elizabeth Park or Mrs John Thomson known as Betty Burns, was born in 1791 in Leith, Scotland. She was the illegitimate daughter of Robert Burns and Anna Park who was a barmaid at The Globe in Dumfries. She married John Thomson in 1808 to become Elizabeth Thomson.

== Association with Robert Burns ==
Elizabeth's mother Anna Park first met Burns when she was only 21 and following an adulterous affair with the poet whilst Jean was away visiting relatives at Mauchline, gave birth to Elizabeth on 31 March 1791 just a few days before his wife Jean Armour gave birth to his legitimate son, William Nicol Burns.

Anna Park is said to have given up Elizabeth to Robert Burns in 1793 when she was seeking a position as a domestic servant. The birth is said to have taken place in Leith where she was sent so that the birth would not lead to Burns being the subject of scandal. One other tradition is that Anna died while giving birth to Elizabeth or soon after, and it is on record that Maria Riddell wrote that Jean Armour was a generous person for having taken in an illegitimate child "... who had lost her mother." Anna vanishes from history in the early 1790s.

== Life and character ==
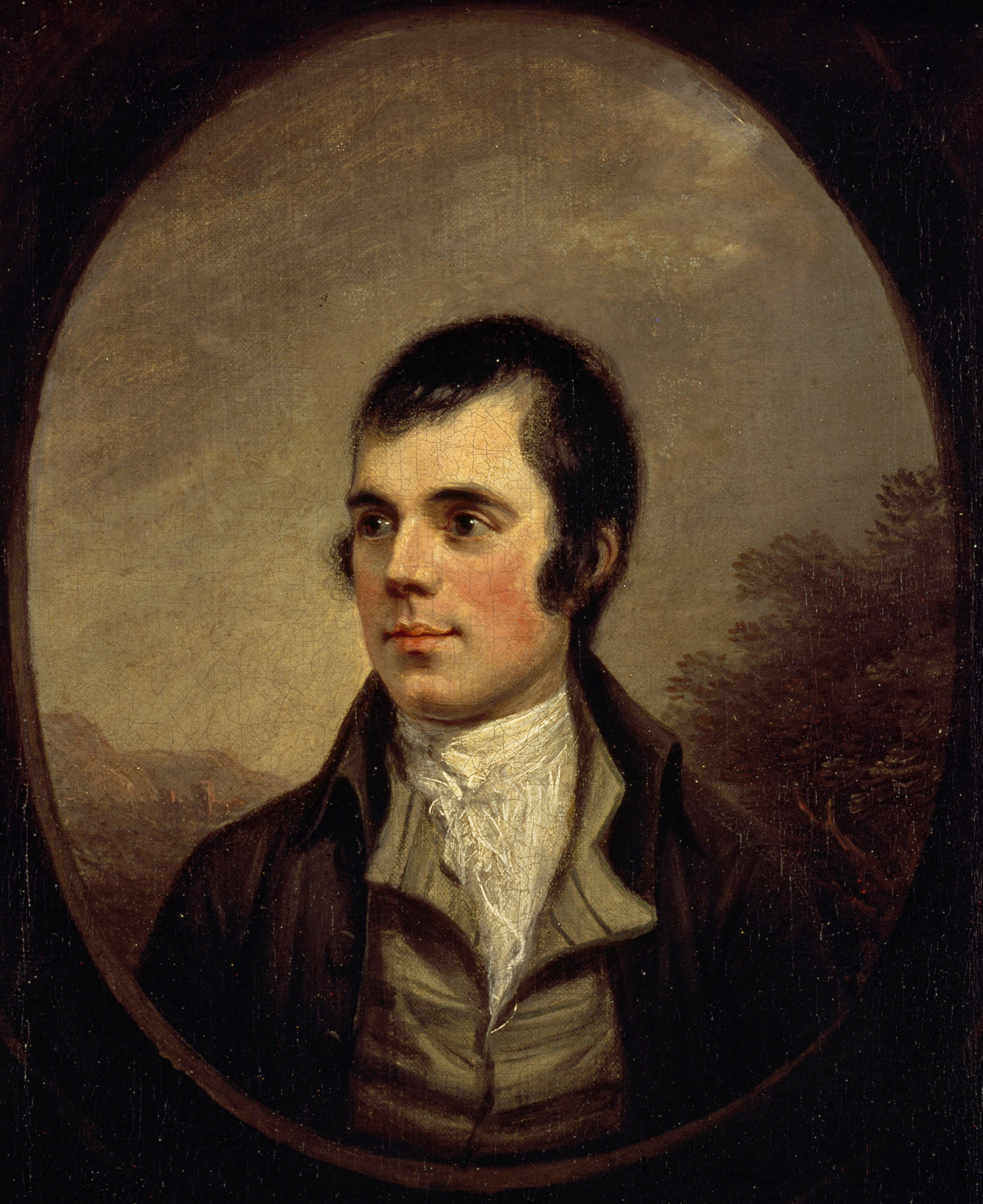
Full view of the Naysmith portrait of 1787, Scottish National Portrait Gallery

Elizabeth "Betty" Burns is said to have been born on 31 March 1791 in Leith, Midlothian, Edinburgh. Elizabeth was without doubt the daughter of Anna Park and Robert Burns. Jean Armour brought up Elizabeth, as one of her own family, commenting that "Our Robin should hae had twa wives." She received, at the age of 21, the sum of £200 from the fund raised by her father's admirers as organised by Sir James Shaw. A sum of £260 was raised by public subscription that helped her and John in their declining years.

Betty had her father's looks and the neighbours at Leith were aware of her parentage. Jean gave her granddaughter the surname 'Burns' after her husband's death. She is said to have resembled Burns more than any of his other children.

It is recorded that she visited Janet Little, the 'Scotch Milkmaid' poet at Loudoun Castle shortly before she died in March 1813.

=== Marriage and children ===
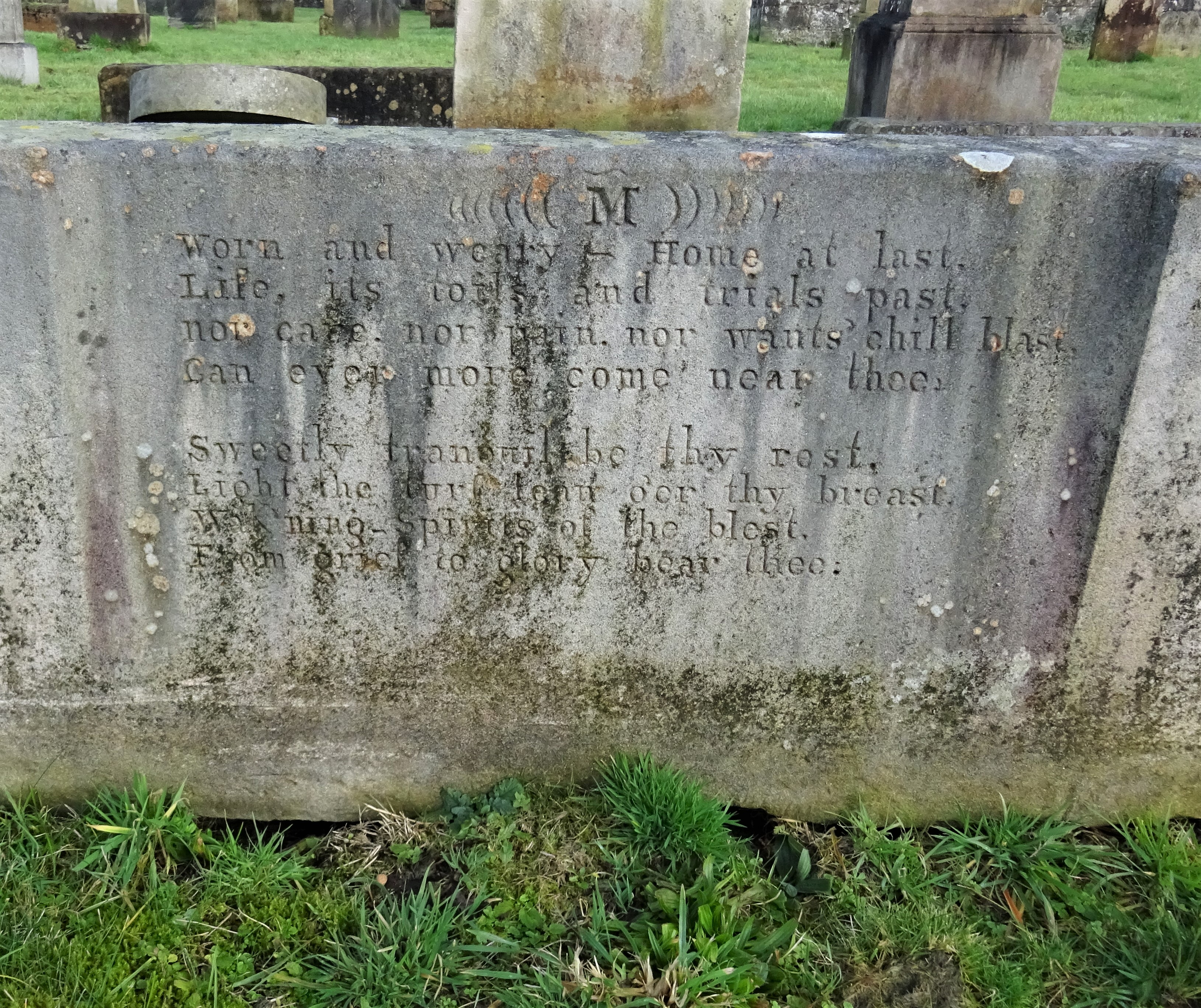
Robert Burns Thomson's verses on the Thomson family memorial.

Elizabeth or 'Betty' Burns as she was known, married Private John Thomson of the Stirling Militia. John was the son of William Thomson and Agnes Adam, and had been born in Glasgow in 1788. They married on 2 June 1808 in Dumfries at Robert Burns's house and the very next day he was ordered with his regiment to Berwick-on-Tweed where he was based for a year and his son William was born there. John was moved again and sent Betty and William to stay with his parents in Pollokshaws, Renfrewshire, later to become part of Glasgow city, until he left the militia in 1814, taking up the trade of handloom weaving, and remaining in Pollockshaws until their deaths. The £200 she received from the fund set up by Sir James Shaw enabled her to rent and furnish their first house and she worked at needle-flowering for a local warehouses.

Their children were William Thomson b. 23 March 1809, d. 22 May 1855; Jean Armour Thomson b. 27 July 1815, d. 22 January 1891; Robert Burns Thomson b. 16 December 1817, d. 14 April 1887; Agnes Thomson b. c 1821, d. 6 May 1865; Sarah Burns Thomson b. c 1825, d. 15 December 1885; James Glencairn Thomson b. 19 October 1827, d. 9 July 1911; Elizabeth Thomson b. 26 July 1830; and Margaret Thomson b. 3 May 1833, d. 23 November 1896.

Robert Burns Thomson wrote the words to the popular Crimean War song "My Daddy's Awa' at the War" however he never published his poems in book form. He married Elizabeth McNaught, had nine children and worked as a handloom and power-loom weaving becoming a manager at Scott's textile factory and later setting up his own brush manufacturing business in Stockwell Street. James Glencairn Thomson died aged eighty-four in 1911. The brothers lie beside their parents. Margaret Thomson died aged sixty-three in 1898 and married David Wingate the 'Collier Poet, a colliery manager. Jean Armour Thomson married a weaver named John Thomson and died on 22 January 1892 aged seventy-five.

Janet Elsie-May Coom, the great, great, great-granddaughter of Robert Burns, through Anna Park, was made an honorary member of the Irvine Burns Club in January 2009.

=== Memorials ===
John died on 22 February 1869 and Betty died on 13 June 1873 in Crossmyloof at the age of 82. They are both buried in the Thomson family lair at the Old Burgher churchyard at the Vennel, known today as the Kirk Lane Burial Ground in Pollokshaws and Robert Burns Thomson, their second son, composed stanzas that are carved on their gravestone.

"Worn and weary, home at last,
Life, its toils and trials past,
Nor care, nor pain, nor wants' chill blast,
Can ever more come near thee.

Sweetly tranquil be thy rest,
Light the turf lean o'er thy breast,
Wak'ning spirits of the blest,
From grief to glory bear thee."

Robert Burns Thomson died in 1887. James Glencairn Thomson died aged eighty-four in 1911, the last survivor of the family, and the two brothers lie beside their parents. Margaret Thomson died aged sixty-three in 1898. Jean Armour Thomson died on 22 January 1892 aged seventy-five. All are recorded on the memorial stone at the lair.

=== Relationship with the Burns family ===
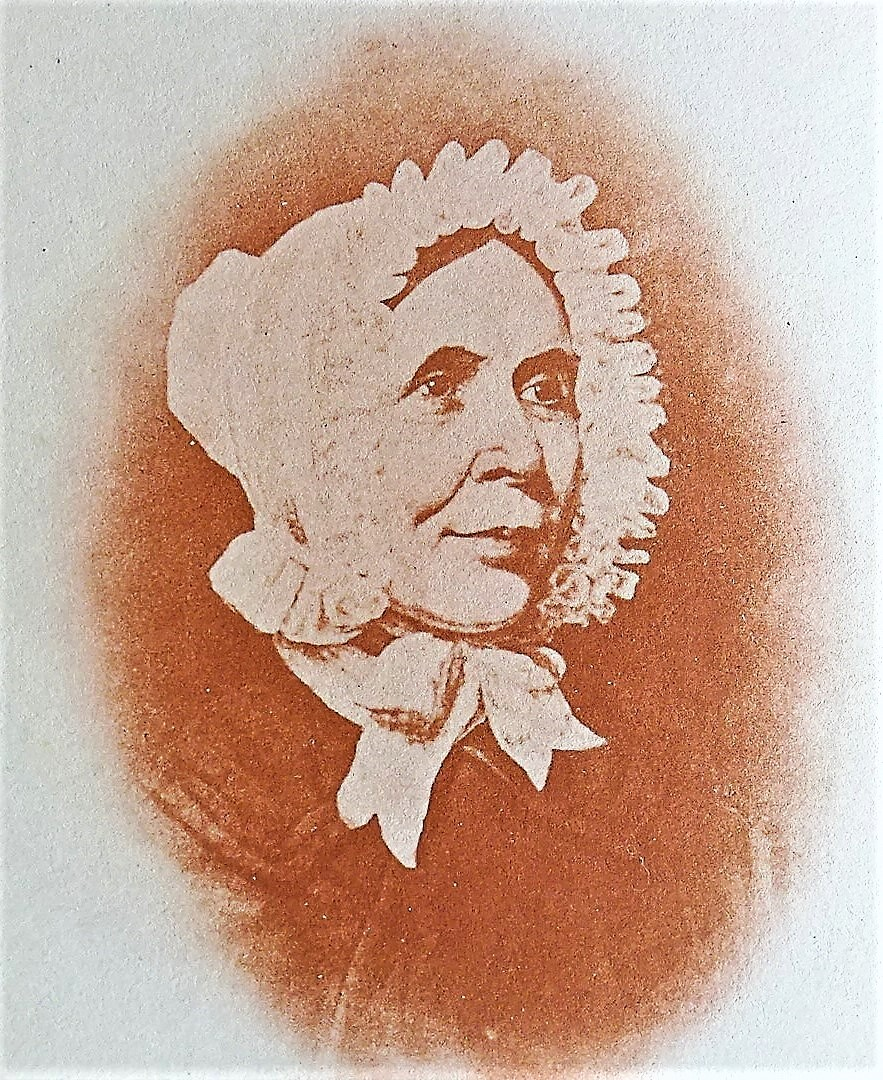
Isabella Burns Begg, Elizabeth's aunt

Betty kept in contact with the family and in November 1819 Isobel Begg, Burns's youngest sister, relates in a letter that Betty's husband had been out of work for some time and was now working as a labourer earning nine shillings a week except for when the weather was bad. She wrote "God help them! Poor creatures! I have not filled my mouth once but I have thought of them." In 1843 she wrote to Isobel Begg née Burns recalling that she had named her children James and Sarah at the behest of Jean Armour and that in 1833 Jean had sent her £2 to purchase a frock for her youngest child. The letter to Isobel dated from after Jean's death and in it she was highly complimentary about Jean, the lady who had raised her. Saying that she was "a woman whose memory I will ever cherish with fond remembrance for her many good qualities, but more especially for the prudent and motherly manner she always conducted herself towards me. The more I live the more I admire her character the more."

She felt that the Burns family did not accept her, most notably through her exclusion from the Burns Festival in Ayr of 1844. Significantly her son Robert was rejected upon trying to greet his father's sons, his uncles, at the Ayr Festival. She stated that her 'unfortunate' birth was the greatest stain by far on her father's character.

Elizabeth Riddell Burns died close to her third birthday and Robert wrote in several letters that she was his only daughter.

Brown records that two of Anna's grandsons were however feted at the 1859 Glasgow Anniversary Celebrations held at the King's Arms Hall in the Trongate, being the sons therefore of her daughter Betty and John Thomson. The toast at the event was to the "Surviving Members of the Burns Family" and Robert Burns Thomson answered the toast on behalf of the Burns family. James Glencairn Thomson sang "A Man's a Man" and his brother Robert sang "Scots Wha Hae". Agnes Watson, née Thomson, was also a guest at the celebrations as was her sister Margaret.

== See also ==
- Jean Armour
- Lesley Baillie
- Alison Begbie
- Nelly Blair
- Isabella Burns
- May Cameron
- Mary Campbell (Highland Mary)
- Jenny Clow
- Helen Hyslop
- Nelly Kilpatrick
- Jessie Lewars
- Anne Rankine
- Isabella Steven
- Peggy Thompson
