= Anna Park (Robert Burns) =

Scottish barmaid

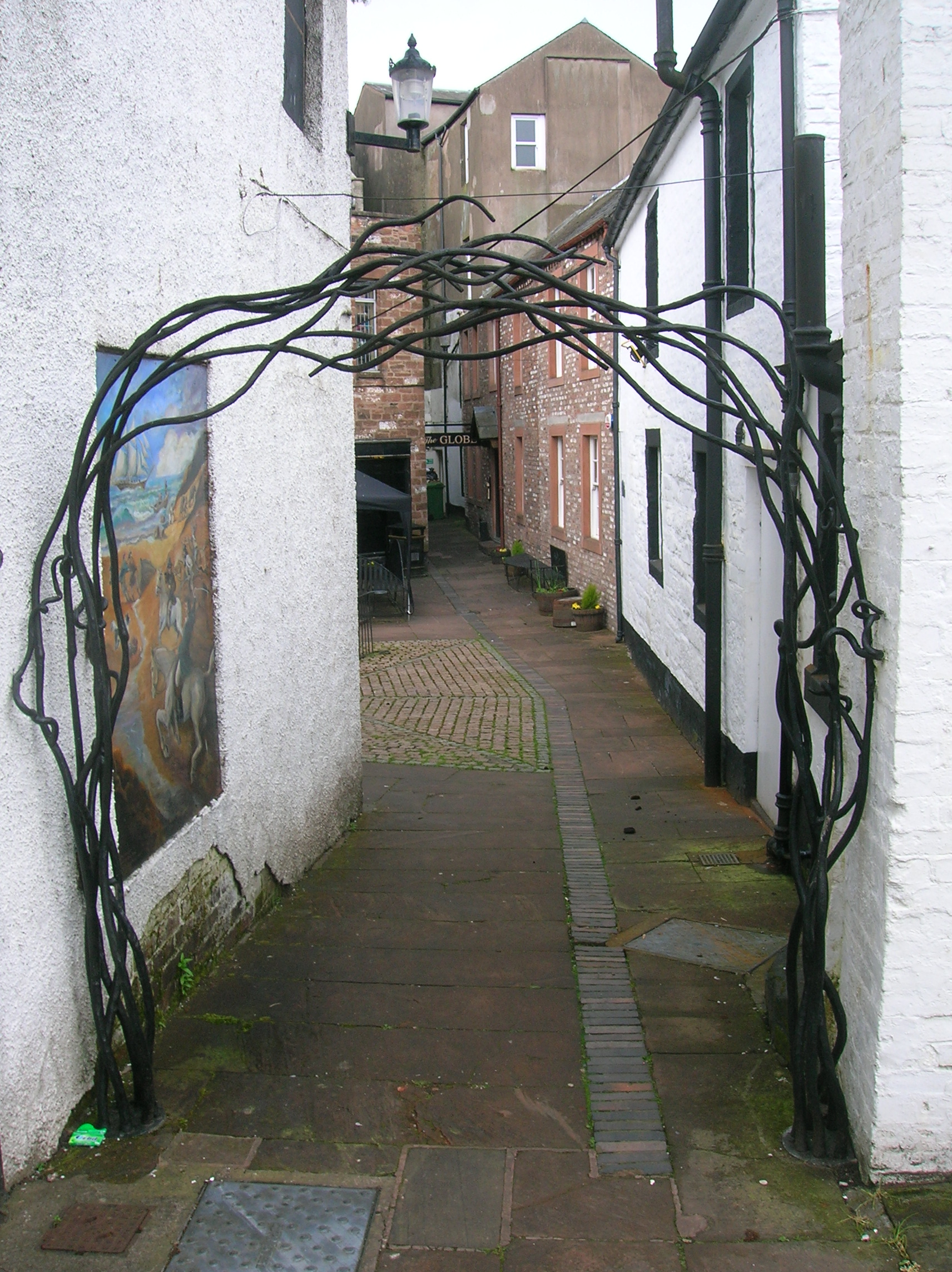
- The Globe Tavern Close, Dumfries
- Born: 1769; Moffat
- Died: 1791 (aged 21–22); Scotland
- Occupation: Barmaid

Helen Anne Park, known as Anna Park (used throughout for consistency) or Ann Park, was born in 1769 at Moffat, Scotland. She was thought to have been the daughter of Joseph Park, an Edinburgh coachmaker, and Jean Dick. However, recent research has shown that she was actually the daughter of Walter Park and Elizabeth Blacklock. Margaret Ewing née Park, a onetime landlady of 'The Globe', was her sister and she worked there as a barmaid. Anna bore the poet Robert Burns an illegitimate child named Elizabeth 'Betty' Burns as a result of an adulterous affair.

== Life and character ==
Anna was a niece of Mrs Jean Hyslop (born Jean or Jane Maxwell), who had been the landlady at the Globe Tavern in Dumfries before Anna's sister Margaret Ewing née Park took over. Anna had five sisters in all, namely Margaret, Janet, Betty, Elizabeth and Janet. Anna's father was a servant and later a chaise driver.

Anna first met Burns when she was only 21 and, following an adulterous affair with the poet, gave birth on 31 March 1791 to Robert Burns's daughter Elizabeth 'Betty' Burns just a few days before his wife Jean Armour gave birth to his legitimate son William Nicol Burns. Anna Park is said to have given Elizabeth to Burns in 1793 when she was seeking a position as a domestic servant. The birth is thought to have taken place in Leith where she was sent so that the birth would not lead to Burns being the subject of scandal at this stage.

One other tradition is that Anna actually died whilst giving birth to Elizabeth or soon after, and Maria Riddell wrote that Jean Armour was a generous person for having taken in an illegitimate child "... who had lost her mother." She certainly vanishes from history in the early 1790s.

Brown records that two of Anna's grandsons were at the 1859 Glasgow Anniversary Celebrations, sons therefore of her daughter Betty and John Thomson.

=== Association with Robert Burns ===
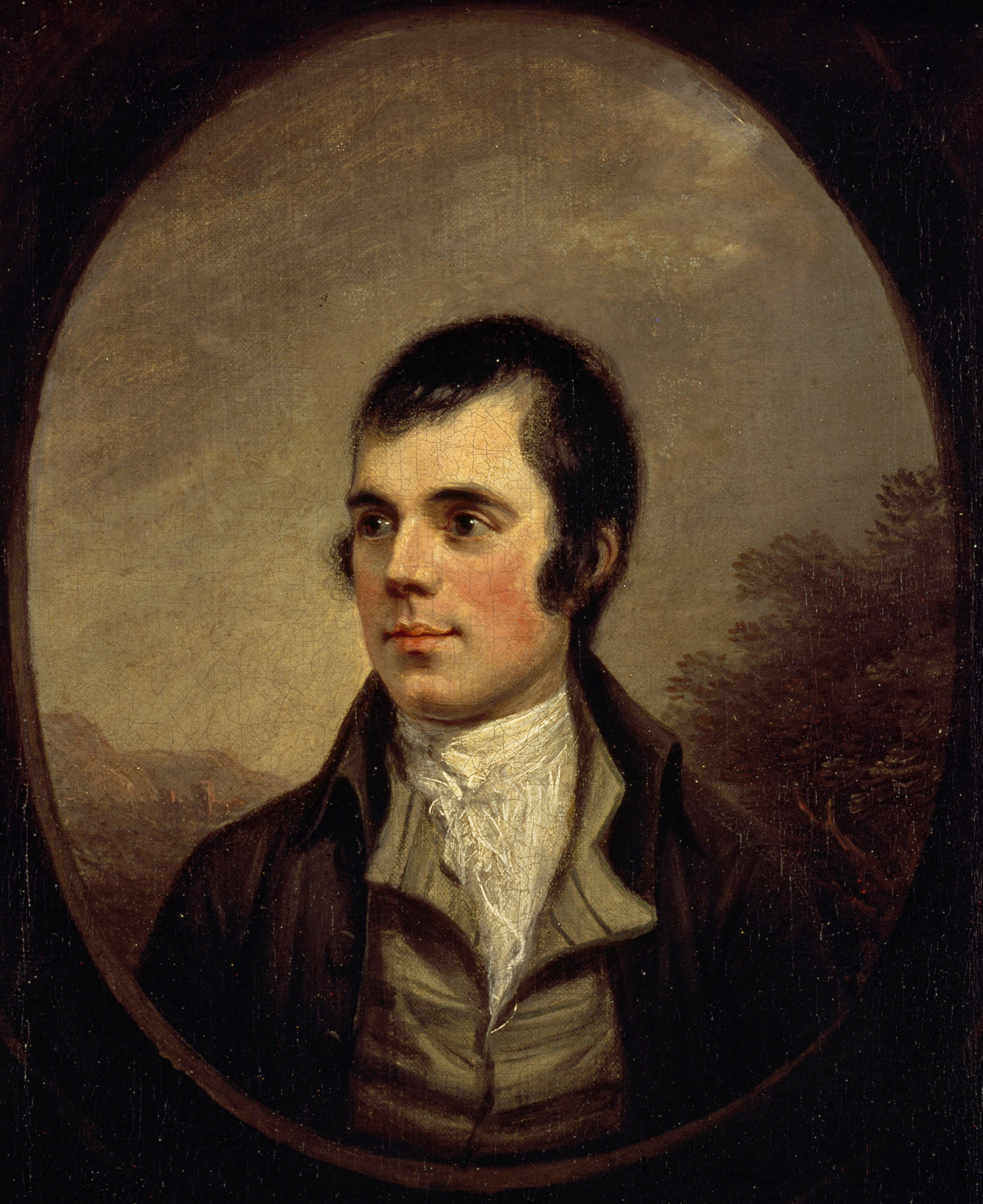
Full view of the Naysmith portrait of 1787, Scottish National Portrait Gallery

Burns first met Anna Park at the Globe Tavern in Dumfries, where she worked as a barmaid. She was Burns's "Anna of the gowden locks" although when the song was first published in 1799 the subject of the song had "raven locks."

Anna may also have been the inspiration of "Yestreen, I had a pint of wine," the lovesong that Burns considered his best. In his totally unrepentant postscript the poet wrote:

The Kirk an' State may join an' tell,
To do sic things I maunna:
The Kirk an' State may gae to hell,
And I'll gae to my Anna.

She is the sunshine o' my e'e,
To live but her I canna;
Had I on earth but wishes three,
The first should be my Anna.

Very little primary evidence survives about the relationship between Burns and Anna Park who vanishes from the records after their child 'Betty' was born. Local tradition relates that Anna "had other pretty ways to render herself agreeable to the customers at the inn than the serving of wine", however no real evidence exists to confirm this.

Some confusion exists over Anna Parks first name and surname in the various sources, with variations such as Ann Hyslop, Helen Anne Hislop, Etc. The variation Helen Hyslop adds to the confusion as a 'beauty' of this name from Moffat is said to have had an affair and a daughter, also Helen, by the poet.

A letter of 1792 to Maria Riddell has led to speculation that she had been asked by Burns to carry out a task regarding Elizabeth, Ann's daughter.

Janet Elsie-May Coom, the great, great, great-granddaughter of Robert Burns, through Anna Park, was made an honorary member of the Irvine Burns Club in January 2009.

== See also ==
- Jean Armour
- Lesley Baillie
- Alison Begbie
- Nelly Blair
- Isabella Burns
- May Cameron
- Mary Campbell (Highland Mary)
- Jenny Clow
- Helen Hyslop
- Nelly Kilpatrick
- Jessie Lewars
- Anne Rankine
- Isabella Steven
- Peggy Thompson
- Elizabeth 'Betty' Burns
- Elizabeth Bishop (Burns)
