= Jean Armour =

Wife of the poet Robert Burns (1765–1834)

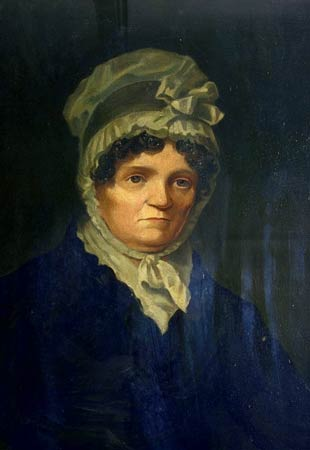
- Jean Armour, painted by John Alexander Gilfillan, in 1822
- Born: 25 February 1765; Mauchline, Ayrshire, Scotland
- Died: 26 March 1834 (aged 69); Dumfries, Scotland
- Occupation: Housewife
- Spouse: Robert Burns
- Children: 9
- Parent(s): James Armour; Mary Smith Armour

Jean Armour (25 February 1765 – 26 March 1834), also known as the "Belle of Mauchline", was the wife of the poet Robert Burns. She inspired many of his poems and bore him nine children, three of whom survived into adulthood.

== Biography ==
Born in Mauchline, Ayrshire in 1765, Armour was second oldest of the eleven children of stonemason James Armour (died 1798) and Mary Smith Armour. She met Robert Burns on a drying green in Mauchline around 1784 when she chased his dog away from her laundry. According to Armour's testimony in 1827, she met Burns again at a local dance.

By the time Burns's first illegitimate child, Elizabeth "Bess" Burns (1785–1817), was born to Elizabeth Paton (1760 – c. 1799) on 22 May 1785, he and Jean Armour were in a relationship, and by the end of the year she was pregnant with his child. Her announcement, in March 1786, that she was expecting Robert Burns's baby caused her father to faint. The certificate of an informal marriage agreement between Burns and Armour was probably mutilated by the lawyer Robert Aiken at James Armour's behest, and he removed his daughter to Paisley to prevent local scandal. However, word had spread and the Mauchline Kirk recalled her on 10 June 1786 to admit that she was unmarried and pregnant and to confirm the name of the baby's father. Burns was called on 25 June to also admit his part in the affair.

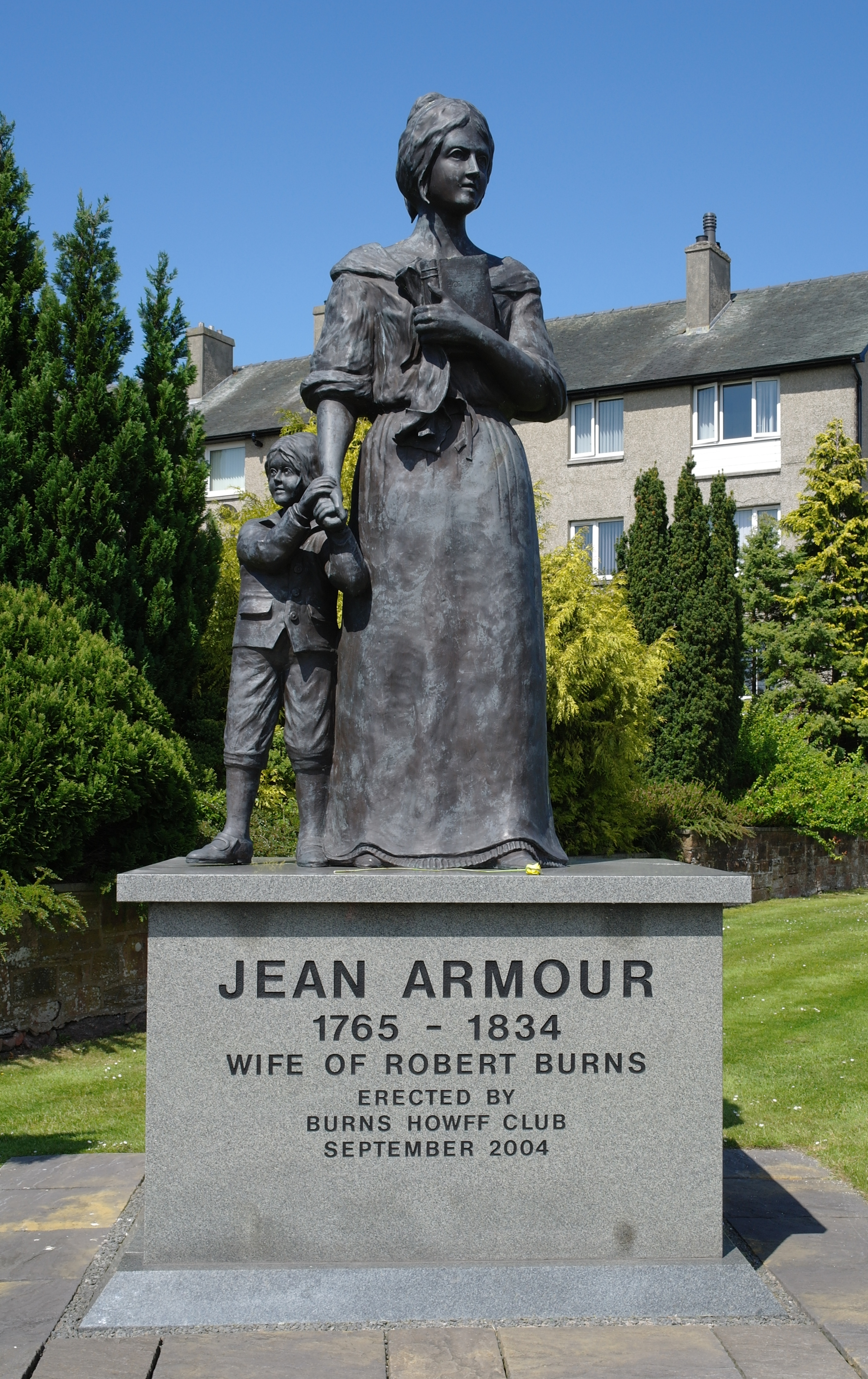
Statue of Jean Armour in Dumfries

His letters from this period indicate that he intended to marry Jean Armour as soon as they realised she was pregnant, but had been discouraged by her reluctance to disobey her father's disapproval of the union. Additionally, at this point, Burns was romantically involved with 'Highland' Mary Campbell (1763–1786), who was also allegedly pregnant by him, and was considering a move to Jamaica. The emigration fell through, and Mary died in October 1786 before she could give birth. Believing he had been abandoned by Jean Armour, Burns set about having himself declared single again and transferred his property to his brother Gilbert Burns (1760–1827) in anticipation of a move. Believing that he was about to abscond, James Armour issued a warrant against him and Burns effectively went into hiding that summer – staying at the home of his aunt, the mother of his successful first cousin, Alexander Allan – when coincidentally his first volume of poetry, commonly called the "Kilmarnock Edition" was published.

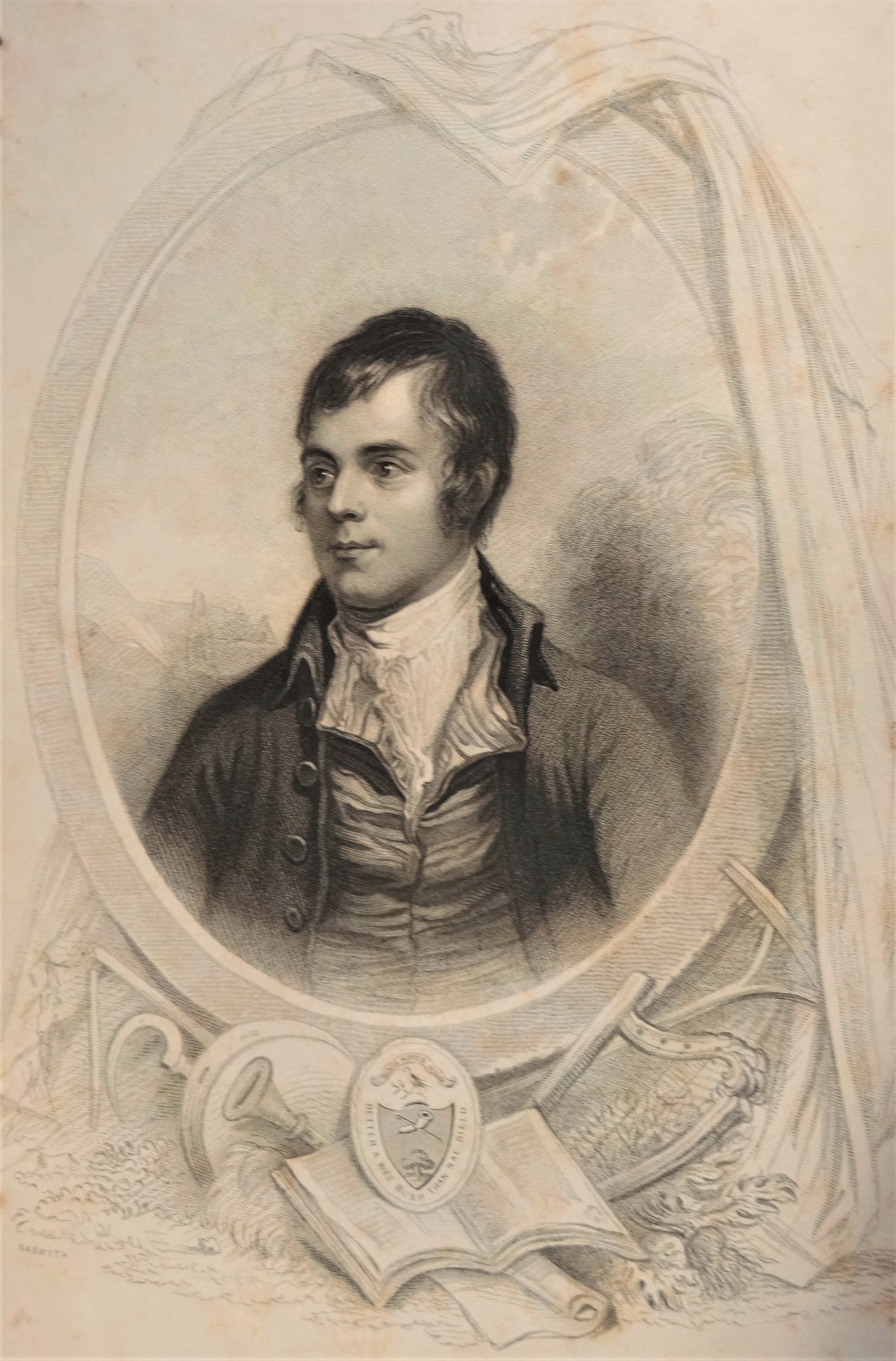
Robert Burns

Jean remained with her parents in the village of Mauchline, and Robert at Mossgiel Farm. The couple continued to live apart even after the birth of their twins Robert (1786 – 1857) and Jean on 3 September 1786, and following the success of the Kilmarnock Edition, Burns moved temporarily to Edinburgh. He returned intermittently to Mauchline, during which time Jean became pregnant by him again. When Burns returned permanently on 23 February 1788 he found Jean was destitute and had been expelled from the family home. They reconciled their relationship, and Burns found her a place to stay. On 3 March she went into labour and delivered a second set of twins, two girls, one of whom died on 10 March, the other on 22 March.

In the light of Burns's new-found celebrity as a poet, James Armour relented and allowed his daughter to be married to him. Although their marriage was registered on 5 August 1788 in Mauchline, the parish records describe them as having been "irregularly married some years ago". She and Burns moved to Ellisland Farm where they stayed until 1791 when they moved to Dumfries, where both would live for the rest of their lives.

Jean Armour and Robert Burns had nine children together (he had at least another four by other women), the last of whom was born on the day of his funeral in July 1796. The legitimate siblings were Robert Burns Junior (b. 3 September 1786); Jean (b. 3 September 1786); William Nicol (b. 9 April 1791); Elizabeth Riddell (b. 1792); James Glencairn (b. 12 August 1794); Francis Wallace (b. 1789) and Maxwell (b. 25 July 1796). Short-lived unnamed twin girls (b. 3 March 1788) were also born to Robert and Jean.

One of Jean's friends at Ellisland Farm was Jean Lorimer, her husband's heroine in a number of his songs under the name of Chloris. Jean lived at the nearby Kemmishall Farm with her father William and mother Agnes.

Her widowhood and the straitened circumstances in which she found herself after Burns's death attracted national attention, and a charitable fund was collected for her and the children. She outlived her husband by 38 years, and lived to see his name become celebrated throughout the world. Twenty years after his death, his fame had reached such a point that his remains were removed from their modest grave in St Michael's Kirkyard, Dumfries, and placed in a specially commissioned mausoleum. Here, Jean Armour was buried when she died in 1834. Statues of Jean were erected in Mauchline in 2002, and in Dumfries, opposite St Michael's Kirk, in 2004.

== Jean Armour Burns’s literacy and correspondence ==
Some reports state incorrectly that Jean Armour was illiterate. Burns commented on her reading his published works in addition to the Bible, and it is known that she did suffer intermittent paralysis a few years before her death in 1834. James Armour was a man of some standing in the Mauchline community, and it is highly unlikely that he would have neglected the education of his children.

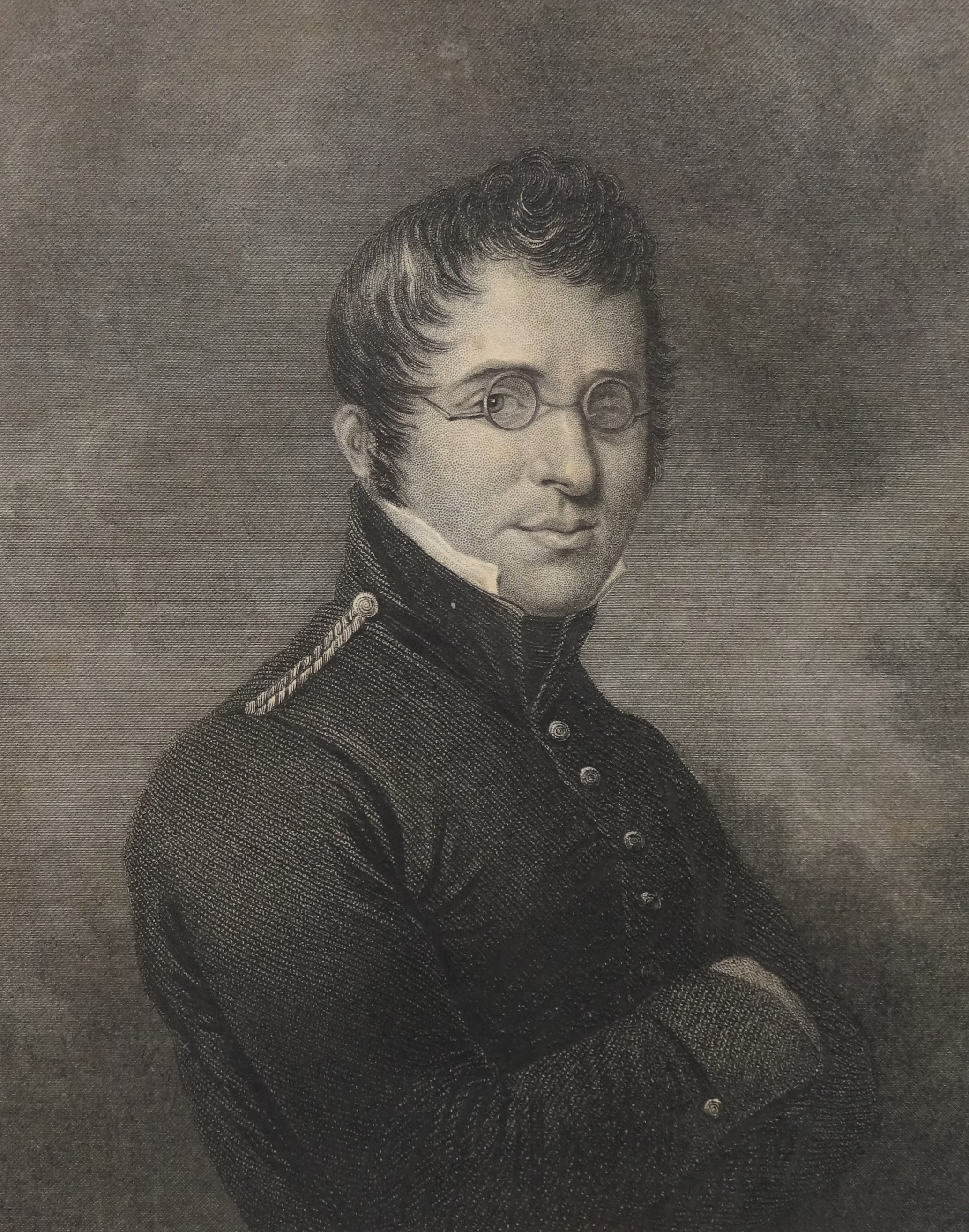
James Glencairn Burns

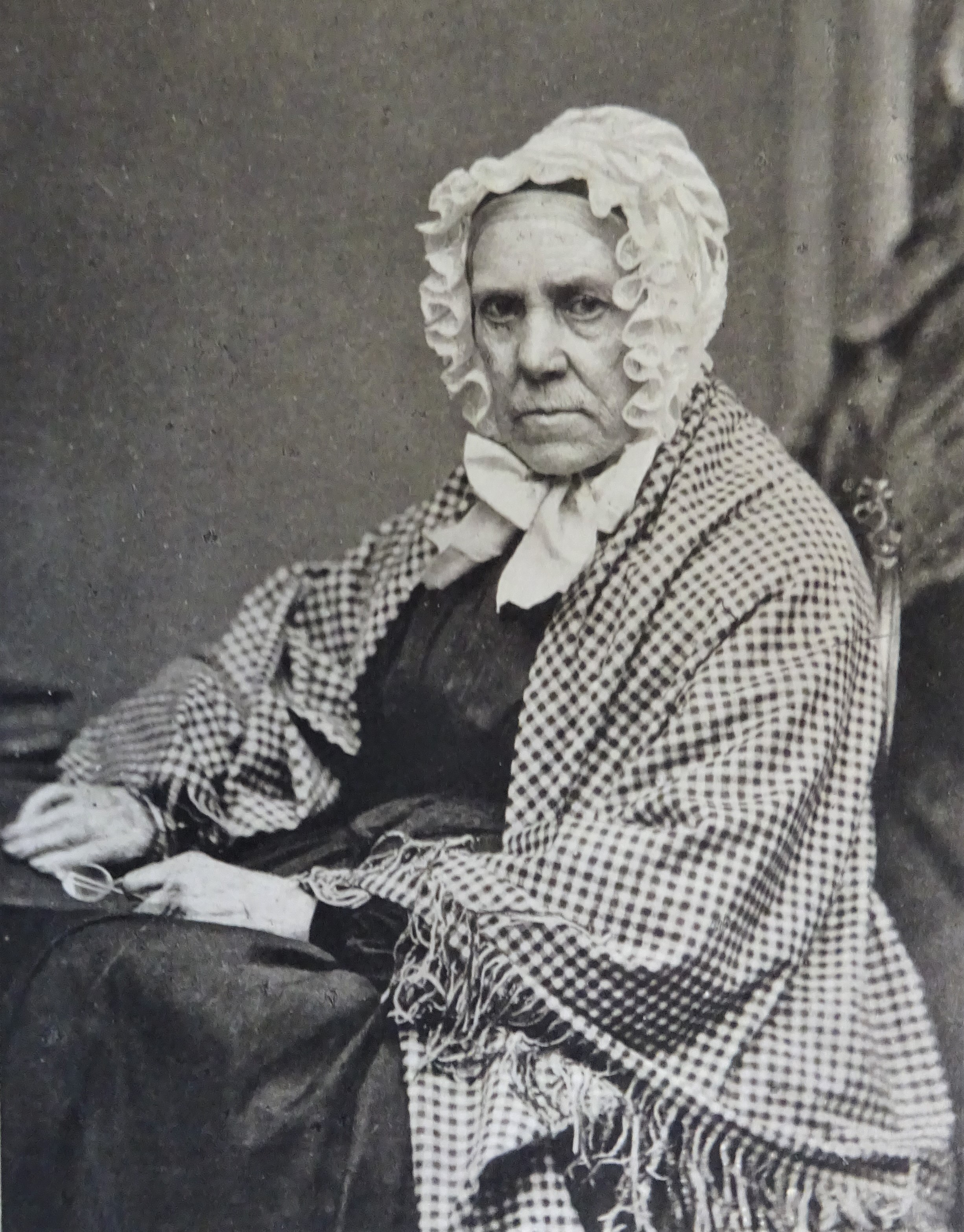
Elizabeth 'Betty' Burns Thomson

Most of Jean's surviving letters were however written by an amanuensis, such as when John Lewars wrote several letters to Burns’s closest friends after his death on Jean’s instructions, including the letter to Frances Dunlop in which it is revealed that Frances did finally relent and write to Burns just before he died.

Strong evidence for her literacy is indicated through Burns mentioning that he had received correspondence from Jean and in particular he wrote to her in 1788, thanking her in loving terms for a letter written to him. A signature in the Session book of Mauchline Kirk does not resemble Burns’s handwriting style and is most probably Jean's.

Elizabeth "Betty" Burns received letters from Jean in February and July 1833, however, although signed by Jean, they were written for her by an amanuensis. She is known to have used the services of the aforementioned John Lewars, as well as James McLure, James Thomson and possibly a close friend, John McDiarmid.

A series of her signatures exist on documents dating from 1786 to 1833 and these show a consistent execution. Actual surviving letters wholly written by Jean include a letter to Lady Hastings in 1816 concerning her son James Glencairn Burns and a second written in 1818, which implied that the Marchioness had travelled to Dumfries where Jean met her. She wrote to her son James Glencairn in 1818 regarding his engagement. In 1816 she wrote to her friend Mrs Perochon, Frances Dunlop’s eldest daughter and in 1804 she replied to a letter from Mrs. Riddell who had asked after Robert Burns’s children. Letters dated in 1816, 1817, 1818 and 1821 to George Thomson also appear to have been written by Jean.

A number of other letters exist that Jean is said to have written, the surviving evidence however is enough to suggest that although she often used an amanuensis, sometimes with considerable input to the phrasing of the text, she was literate and quite capable of composing letters on her own behalf if she so desired.

== See also ==
- Adam Armour
- Lesley Baillie
- May Cameron
- Jenny Clow
- Burns Clubs
- Gavin Hamilton
- Helen Hyslop
- Kate Kemp
- Nelly Kilpatrick
- Jessie Lewars
- Jean Lorimer
- John McMurdo
- Agnes Maclehose
- John MacKenzie (Doctor)
- Peggy Thompson
- Ann Park
- Anne Rankine
- Isabella Steven

== Sources ==
- Jean Armour's birth and marriage dates derived from Scotlandspeople.gov.uk, the Official Government source for Births, Deaths and Marriages in Scotland.
- Dirt and Deity: A Life of Robert Burns, Ian McIntyre, Harper-Collins, 1995. ISBN 978-0-00-215964-7.
- The Complete Works of Robert Burns, Chambers, 1867.
- The Burns Encyclopedia, Maurice Lindsay, Robert Hale, 1959
- Burns. A Biography of Robert Burns. Mackay, James (2004). Darvel : Alloway Publishing. ISBN 0-907526-85-3.
- Jean Armour. Mrs Robert Burns. Am Illustrated Biography. Westwood, Peter (1996). Dumfries : Creedon Publications.
