= William Nicol (teacher) =

Scottish schoolmaster (1744–1797)

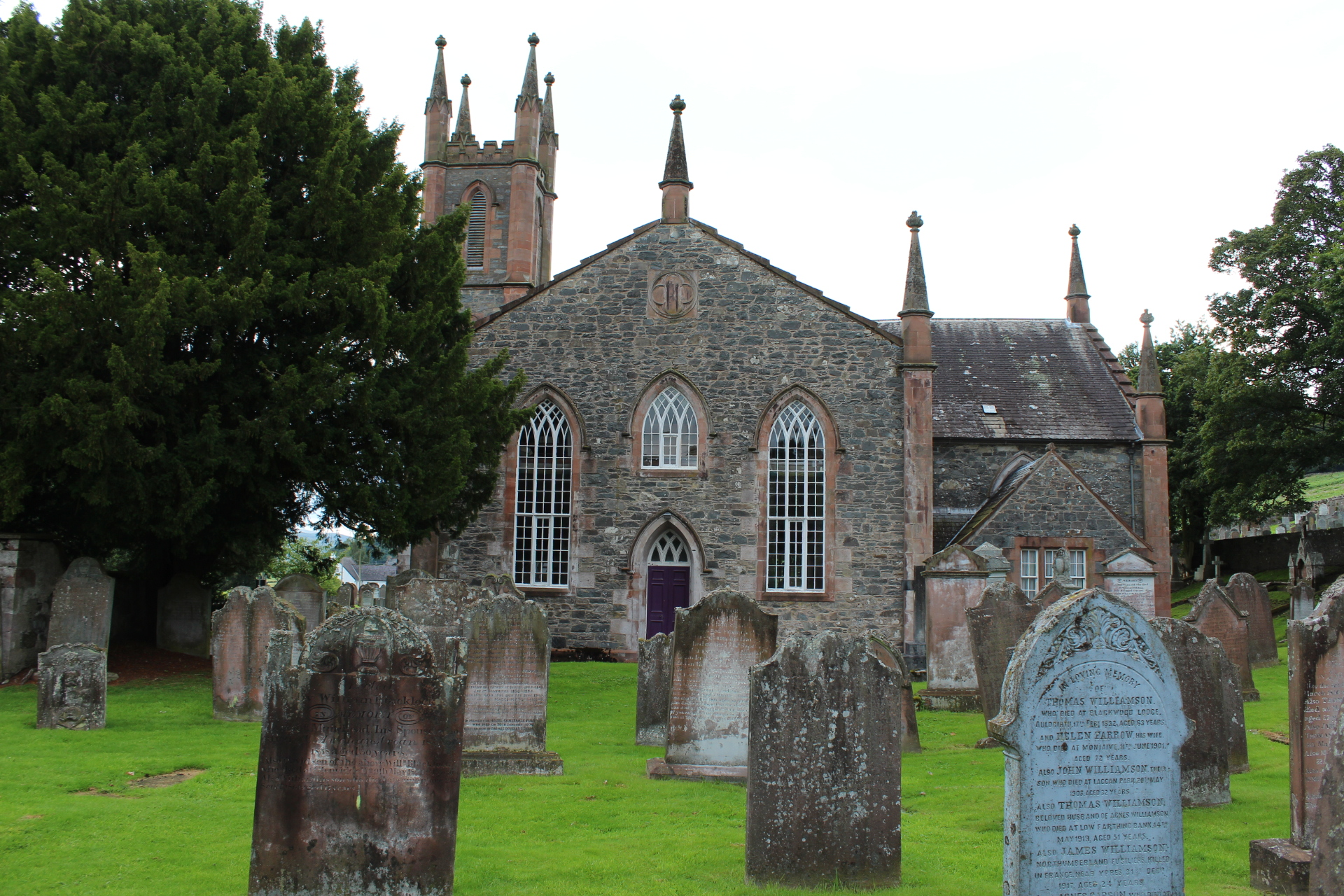
- Glencairn Parish Church at Kirkland.
- Born: 1744; Annan parish
- Died: 21 April 1797; Edinburgh
- Occupation: Teacher

William Nicol (1744–1797) was a Scottish schoolmaster, and, if ill-tempered and vain, one of Robert Burns's close friends. He was born in Annan parish at Dumbretton, Dumfries and Galloway, Scotland. Burns referred to him in one letter as "Kind hearted Willie" and he accompanied the poet on his August 1787 tour of the Highlands. Burns's third son, William Nicol, born at Ellisland Farm in 1791, was named after his friend, the poet commenting that his newborn son had "that propensity to witty wickedness and manfu' mischief, which even at twa days auld I foresaw would form the striking features of his disposition."

== Life and character ==
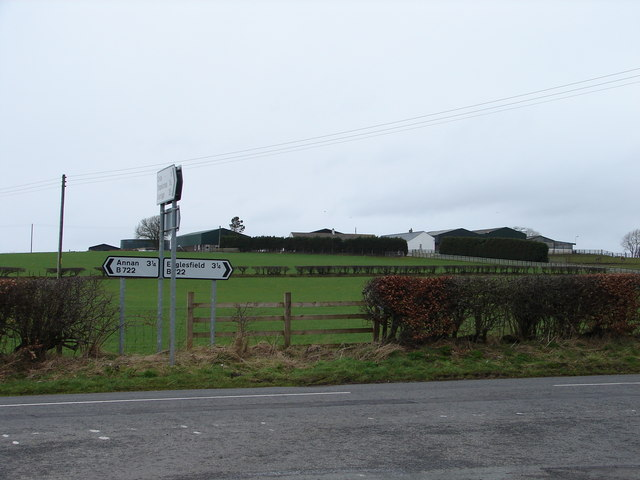
Dumbretton Farm

Nicol's father was a tailor from Ecclefechan who died in poverty when his son was very young. Nicol married Janet Cairns of Torr. Lagganpark on the Keir Hills in the Parish of Glencairns was purchased by the couple using Janet's inheritance, from William Riddell of Camieston, for £1700. Nicol had asked Burns to assess the 340-acre property however he sent two friends in his place as he was too ill to assist his friend. He wrote to Nicol and advised that he should make the purchase, which Nicol did in 1790. Burns did manage a visit to Lagganpark a few months later and, showing a solid grasp of geology, gave a detailed description of valuable limestone deposits that he found on the estate.

Nicol probably purchased Lagganpark as an investment for his retirement with a prospective rental to a tenant of 70 guineas per annum, however in April 1797 Nicol, aware of his ill health, sold the estate a few days before his death from jaundice, cirrhosis of the liver and other complications.

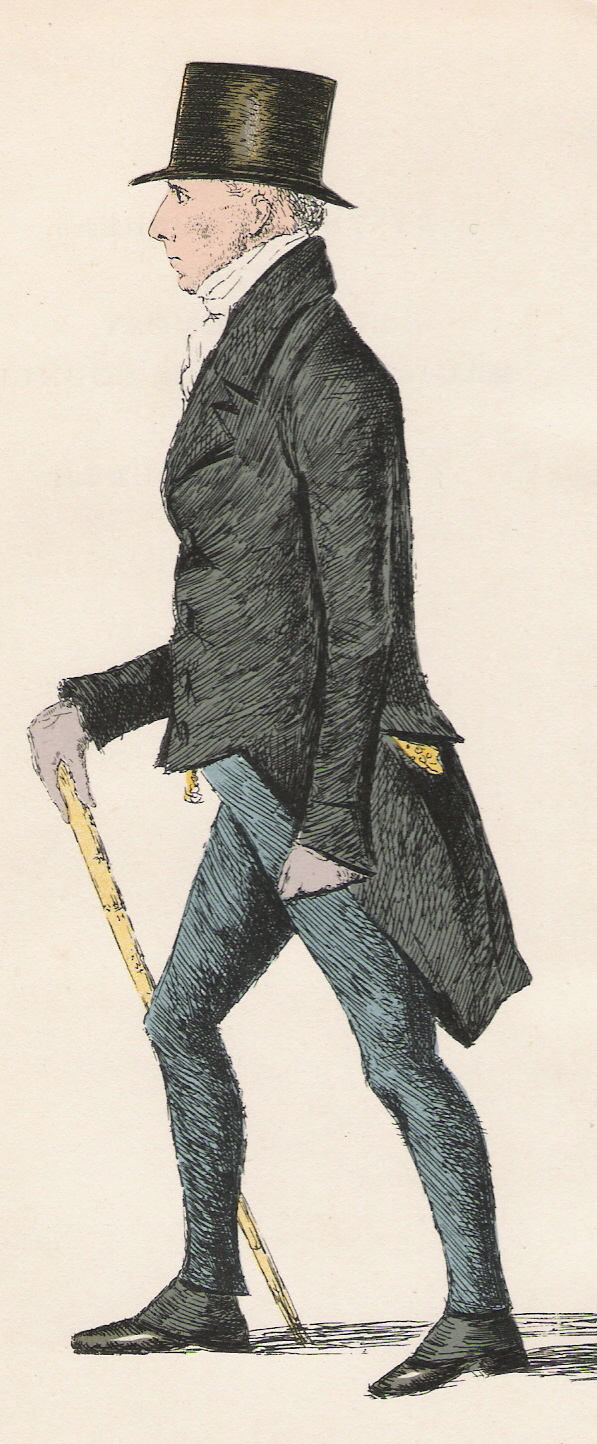
Lord Cockburn

Nicol was at first educated by John Orr, an itinerant teacher. As a teenager Nicol set up his own elementary school in his mother's house. He attended Annan Academy and then studied Theology, changed to Medicine and then to Classics at Edinburgh University. Aged 30, in 1774, taking part in open competition for the post of Classics teacher at the High School in Edinburgh he was successful and earned a reputation as an excellent scholar, but a very harsh disciplinarian. In his Memorial of His Times, Lord Cockburn commented on Nicols "constant and indiscriminate harshness" that was "very hurtful to all his pupils", however an Edinburgh lawyer and writer to the signet, Alexander Young of Harburn, regarded Nicol as "one of the greatest Latin scholars of the age." Sir Walter Scott wrote that Nicol was "worthless, drunken and inhumanly cruel to the boys under his charge."

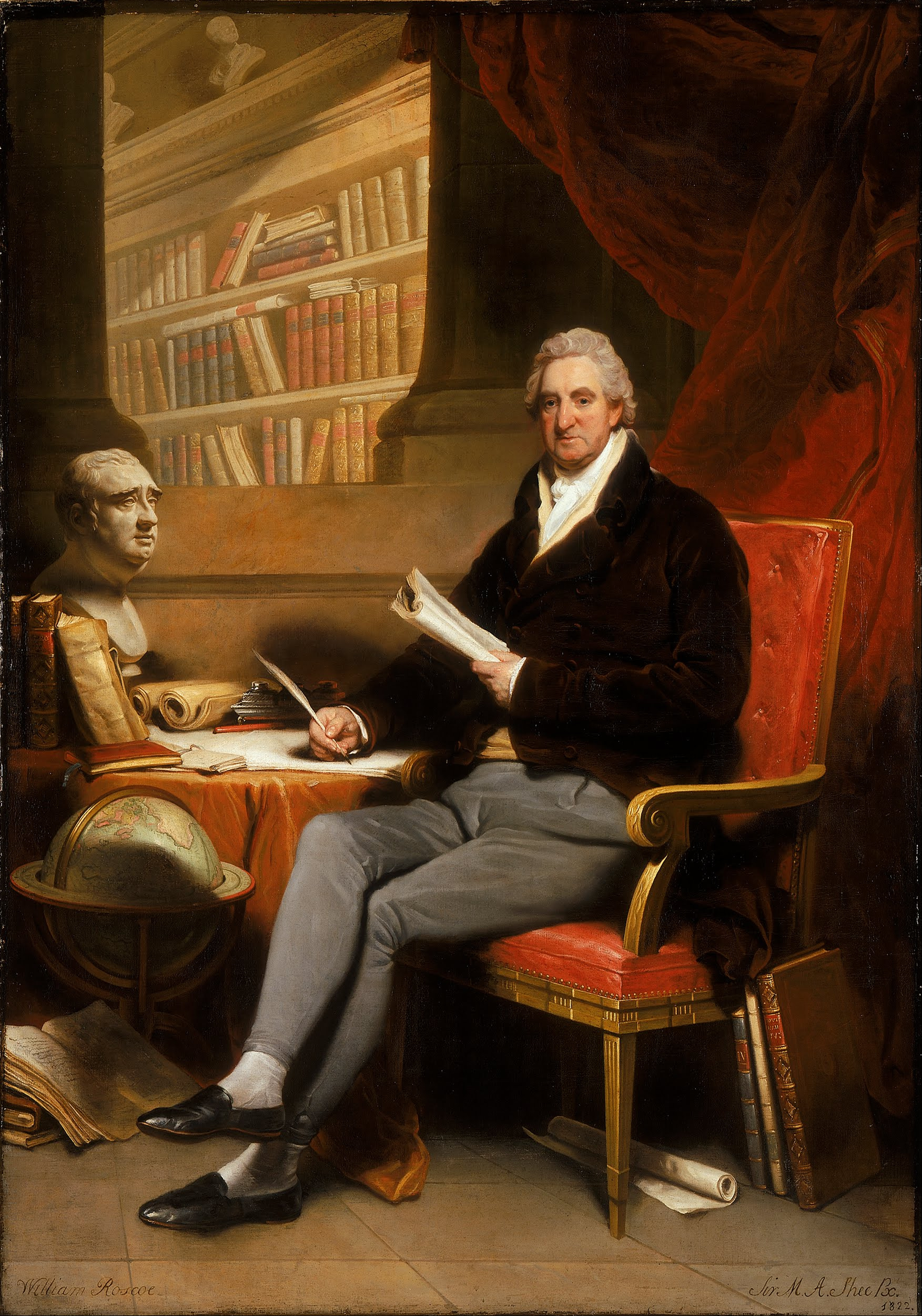
Portrait of William Roscoe by Martin Archer Shee

Nicol set up his own school after leaving in 1795 the High School due to a physically violent quarrel with Dr. Alexander Adam, the Rector. For two years he ran his school successfully up until his death in April 1797 and is thought to have been buried in the Old Carlton Burying Ground.

He was frequently employed, at very reasonable fees, by graduates at Edinburgh University to translate their Medical Law theses into Latin, however he often struggled to get these small payment and he had to employ the aforementioned Alexander Young of Harburn to pursue his debtors. Young felt it prudent to part company however, after Nicol, hearing of how the lawyer William Roscoe had doubted Nicol's claim for payment "fell into an extravagant rage, swore the most unseemly of oaths and uttered the grossest blasphamies."

He was a member of the Canongate Kilwinning Lodge No.2, however his vain, irascible and unpredictably ill tempered personality meant that he was not popular in Edinburgh society.

Charles Hope, Lord Granton, commented that he considered that Nicol was responsible for many of Burns's misfortunes and that "his passions were quite ungovernable, and that he was altogether a most ungovernable savage."

== Association with Robert Burns ==
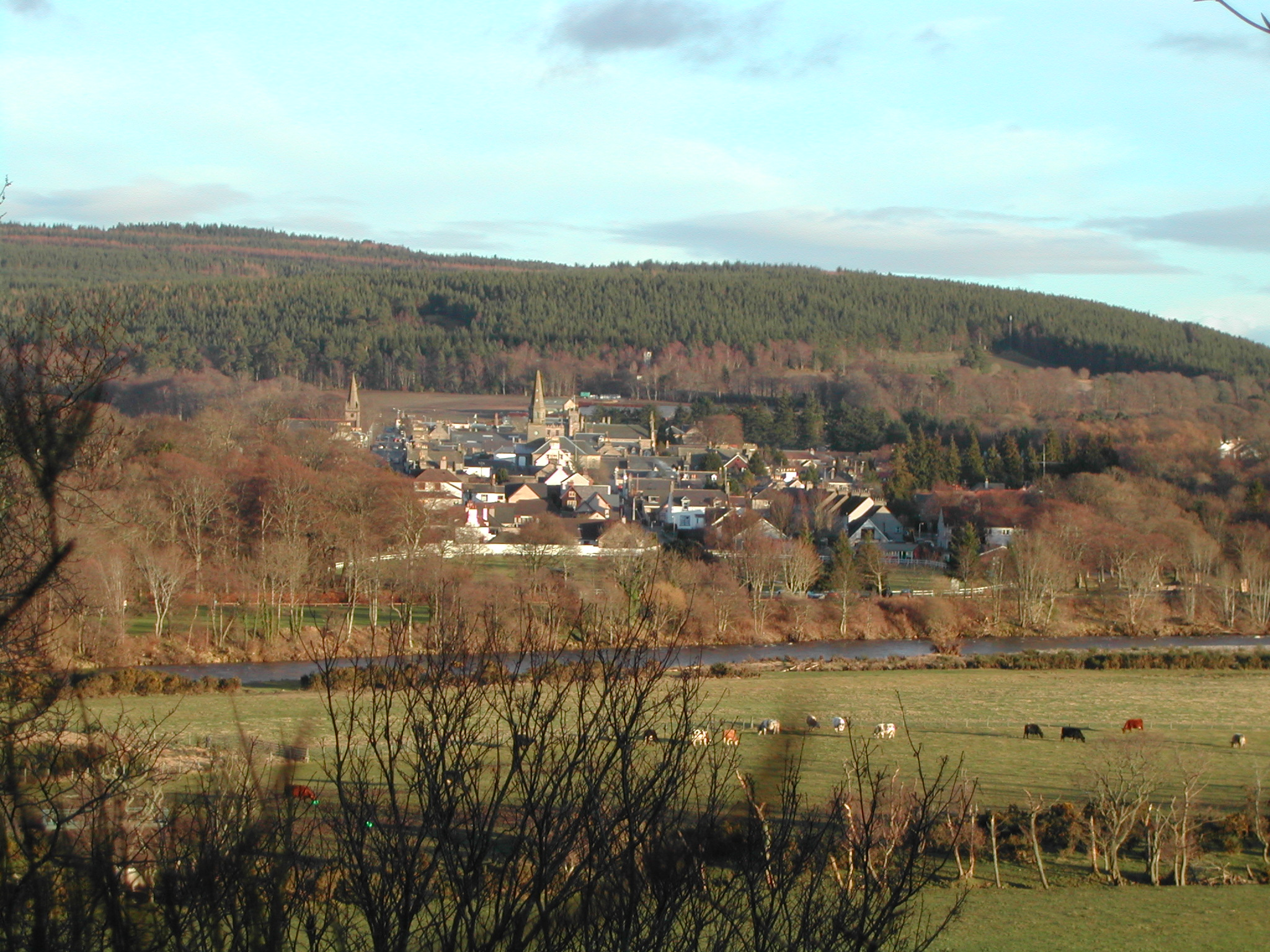
Fochabers and the River Spey

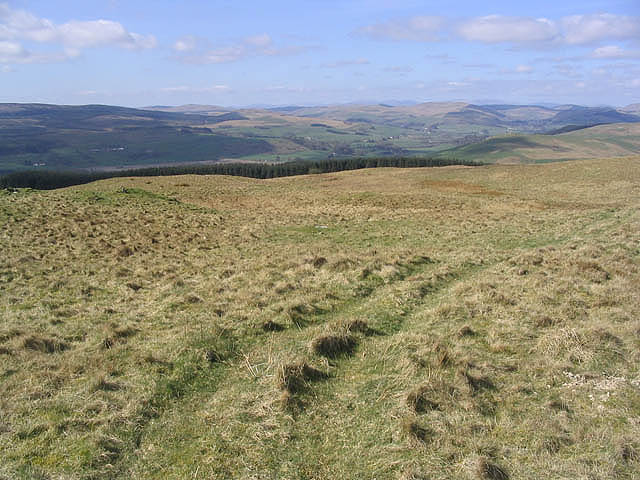
Lagganpark Hill

It is not known how they met, however Burns and Nicol became friends in 1787 and he stayed with the Nicol in Buccleugh Pend near St Patrick Square before Nicol accompanied the poet on his August 1787 tour of the Highlands, however the journey, in a chaise at the 15 years older Nicol suggestion, and mostly at Burns's expense, was still blighted by Nicol's ill temper and their friendship was sorely tested.

Whilst at Stirling, after viewing the castle, Burns engraved on a window pane at Wingate's Inn the following controversial lines;

Here Stewarts once in triumph reign'd,
And laws for Scotland's weal ordain'd;
But now unroof'd their Palace stands,
Their sceptre's fall'n to other hands;
Fall'n indeed unto the Earth.

Whence grovelling reptiles take their birth;
And since great Stewart's line is gone,
A race outlandish fills their throne;
An idiot race to honour lost,
Who know them best despise them most.

Some authors have tried to suggest that they were actually written by William Nicol who held strong pro-Jacobite views.

Famously Nicol took offence when Burns was invited to dine with the 4th Duke and Duchess of Gordon and he felt forced to reject the invitation rather than journey on without Nicol's company. Burns had left Nicol at Fochabers at the inn where they were staying, however feeling neglected, Nicol packed and was ready to leave despite the fact that Burns, rather than a servant of the duke as offered, had come back to collect him.

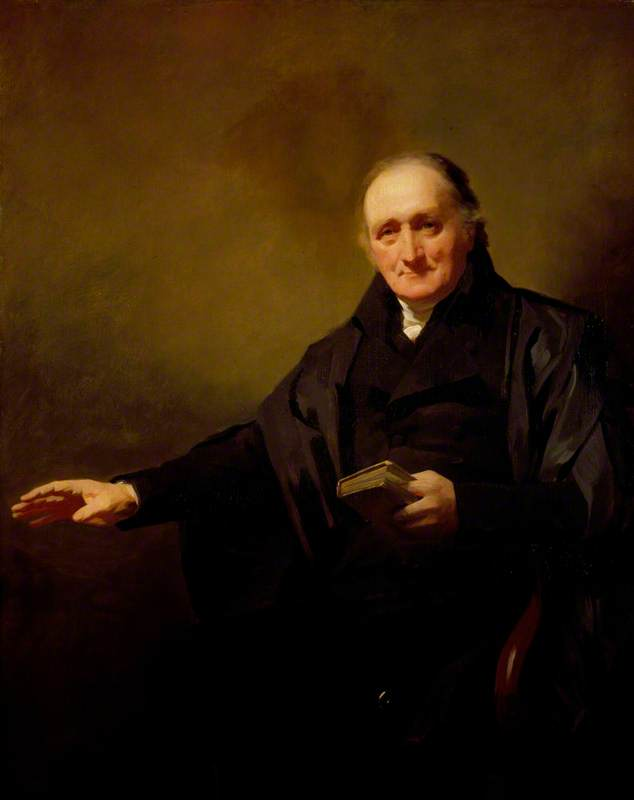
Dr Alexander Adam, Rector of the High School of Edinburgh.

Burns commented to James Hoy, the Duke of Gordon's librarian and companion: "I shall certainly, among my legacies, leave my patent curse to that unlucky predicament which hurried me, tore me away from Castle Gordon. May that obstinate son of Latin prose be curst tp Scotch-mile periods, and damn'd to seven league paragraphs; while Declension and Conjugation, Gender, Number and Time, under the ragged banners of Dissonance and Disarrangement eternally rank against him in hostile array!!!"

Burns also commented that his tour with Nicol was "Like travelling with a loaded blunderbuss at full cock."

In March 1788 Burns commented in a letter to William Cruikshank that "I would send my compliments to Mr Nicol, but he would be hurt if he knew I wrote to any body and not to him."

Following a careless remark to another mutual friend, William Cruikshank, Nicol threatened, in a good natured fashion, to have Burns "summonds to compear and declare" for passing on a very negative assessment of Nicol made by Agnes Maclehose. Burns wrote to Robert Ainslie about this situation on 23 August 1788, the context being a court case that Nicol was fighting against Dr. Adams, Rector of the High School of Edinburgh where Nicol had taught Classics.

William Cruikshank was another of Burns's friends and it was Nicol who introduced them, for Cruikshank was also a Classics teacher at the High School of Edinburgh, and although he had also argued with the Rector, Dr. Adam, he remained at the school.

Dowie's Tavern in Edinburgh was run by John Dowie and served as a regular haunt of Burns, Allan Masterton and Nicol, all three were also members of the Crochallan Fencibles. Dowie's was also popular with the poet Robert Fergusson, Sir Henry Raeburn the artist, David Herd the song collector and many others.

Burns, Nicol and Masterton dined on a sheep's head at The Globe Tavern in Dumfries that had been intended for the landlord and his family, as Burns had forgotten to order in advance. Nicol is said to have persuaded Burns to write the "Grace Before and After Meat" as recompense and likewise 'commanded' him to compose a thanks:

O Lord, when hunger pinches sore,
Do Thou stand us in stead,
And send us, from Thy bounteous store,
A tup or whether head.

O Lord, since we have feasted thus,
Which we see so little merit,
Let Meg, now take away the flesh,
And Jock bring in the spirit.

Burns wrote the Epitaph for William Nicol and the Elegy on Willie Nicol's Mare. Burn's had borrowed a mare, named Peg Nicholson, from Nicol that had, much to Burns's annoyance, unexpectedly died. The horse was to be sold or used and was named for the mad woman who had tried to assassinate King George III. Peg was well looked after, but has suffered poor treatment before Nicol's ownership, and cost Burns a fair amount to treat as well as dying before he could sell her at the Dumfries Fair.

'Epitaph for William Nicol':

Ye maggots, feed on Willie's brains,
For few sic feasts you'fe gotten;
An' fix your claws into his heart,
For fient a bit o't 's rotten.

The 'Elegy on Willie Nicol's Mare':

"Peg Nicholson was a good bay mare,
As ever trod on airn:
But now she floating down the Nith,
And past the mouth o'Cairn.

Willie Brewed a Peck o'Maut was written by Burns and the tune by Masterton, following a merry occasion near Moffat at Willie's Mill, Cragieburn, with Allan Masterton and Nicol.

It was John Lewars who wrote and informed Nicol of Burns's death. Nicol was distressed at "the premature death of my dearly beloved Burns" and commented that "I can no longer view the face of Nature, with the same rapture; and social joy is blighted to me, for ever." He went on to criticise the negative comments published in the press about Burns, saying that "stupidity and idiotcy rejoice, when a great and an immortal genius falls; and they pour forth their invidious reflections, without reserve, well knowing, that the dead Lion, from whose presence, they formerly scudded away, with terror, and, at whose voice they trembled through every nerve, can devour no more."

Nicol also recorded wild gossip regarding Burns's dying statements "The Fanatics have now got it into their heads, that dreadful bursts of penetential sorrow issued from the breast of our friend, before he expired."

Nicol estimated that Burns had received £700 from the First Edinburgh Edition and the sale of the copyright, and, concerned about Burns's family, speculated on what had become of the money.

=== Correspondence ===
Burns wrote his only known letter in pure Scots to "Kind hearted Willie" on 1 June 1787 from, of all places, Carlisle.

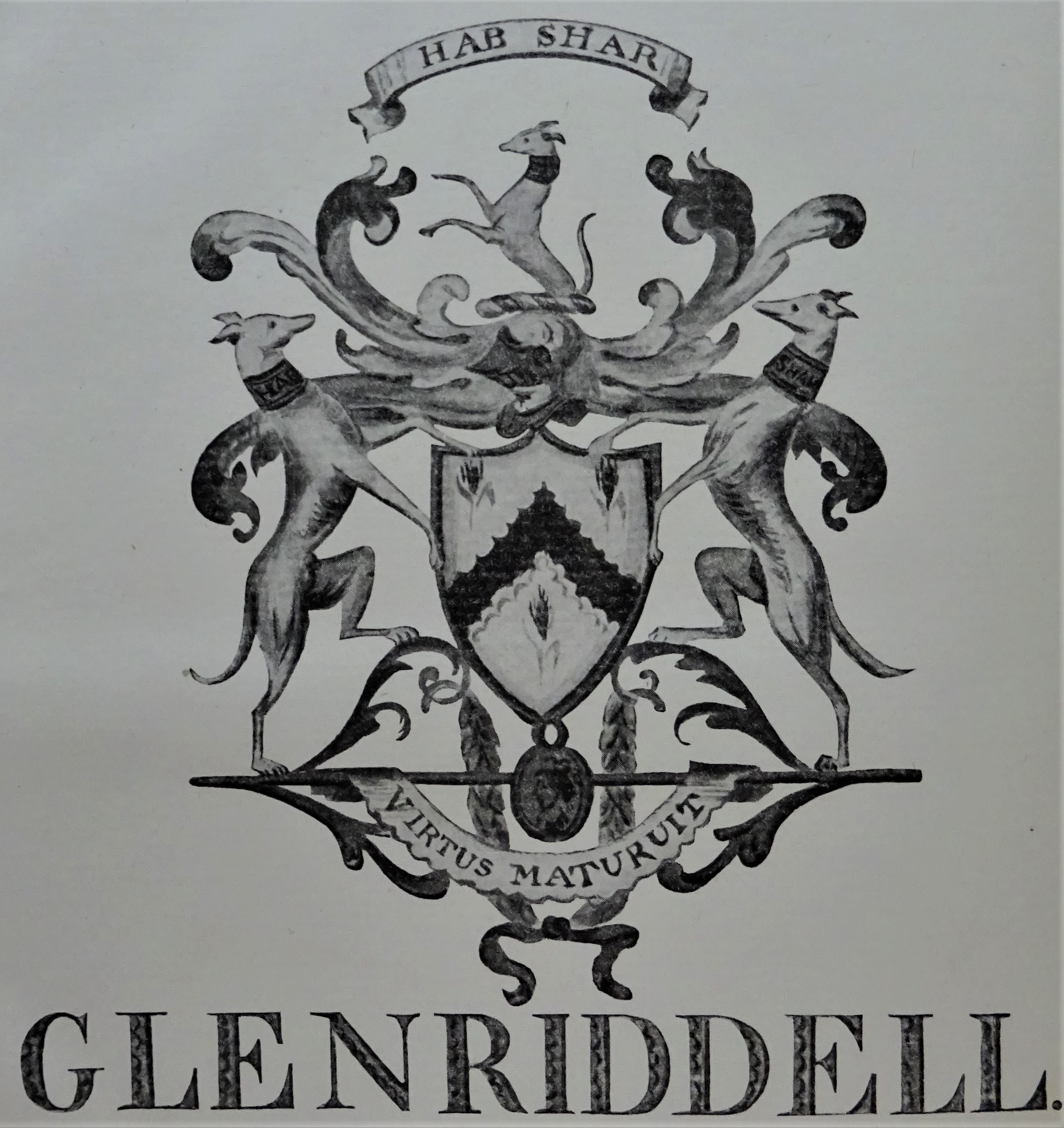
Robert Riddell's coat of arms bookplate from the Glenriddell Manuscripts.

In June 1787 Burns wrote to Nicol from Ellisland Farm about the Rev. William Burnside and his wife Anne, complimenting her and saying that "in short - but if I say one word more about her, I shall be directly in love with her."

Francis Wallace was Burns's second son, named for Frances Dunlop, who died at the age of `thirteen. Burns mentioned him in correspondence with Nicol.

Upon his return to Mauchline from Edinburgh Burns wrote to Nicol "the servility of my plebeian bretherin, who perhaps formerly eyed me askance, since I returned home, have nearly put me out of conceit altogether with my species."

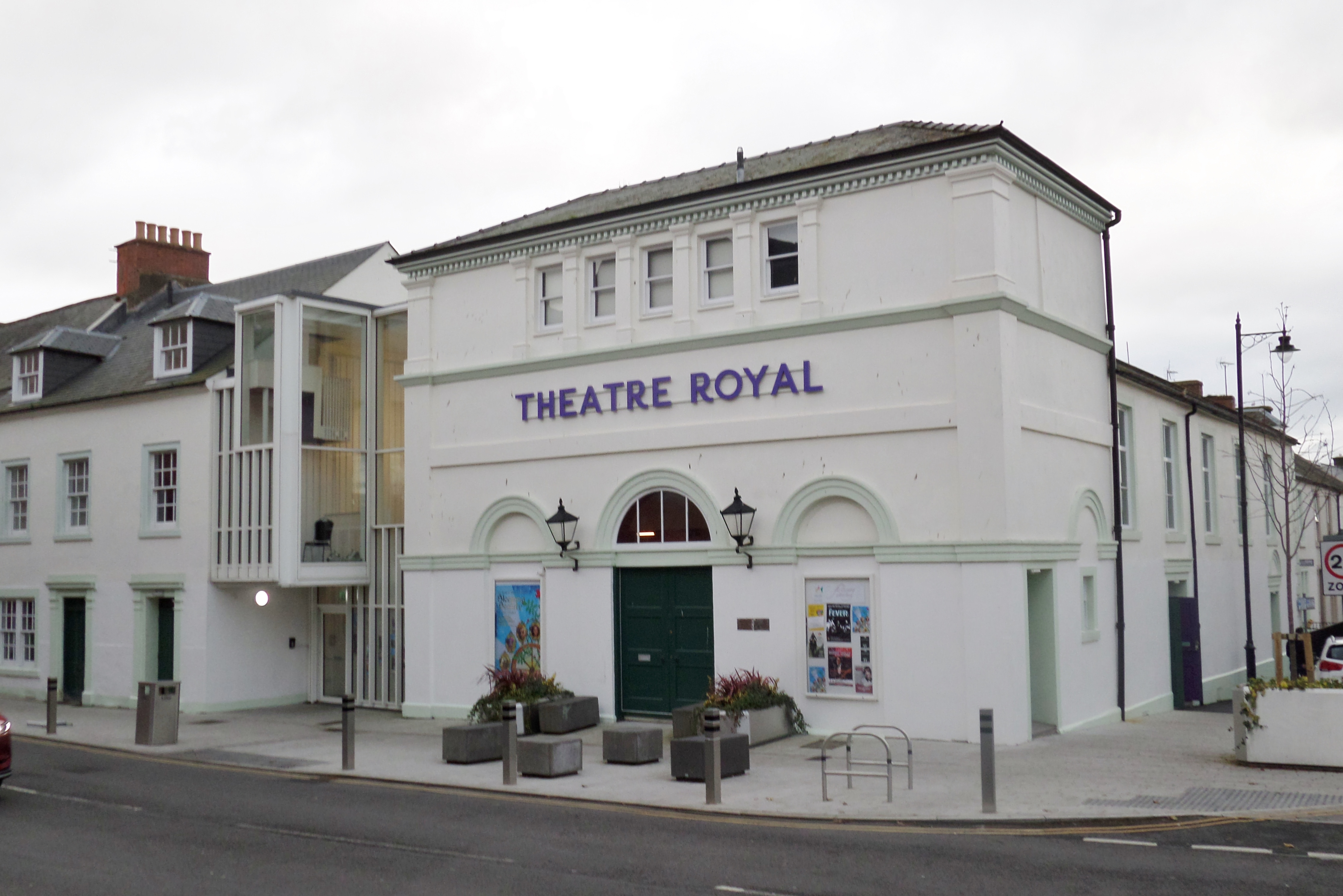
The Dumfries Theatre Royal

In February 1790 Burns wrote enthusiastically to Nicol regarding the great success of a theatrical company at Dumfries and about the plans to build a new theatre there.

Burns wrote "O Mr Nicol, can I ever extinguish the glowing remembrance of you in my bosom! The idea of your uncommon abilities may dissipate a little in comparison, but where, except surrounding the Fountain of Goodness, shall I Find heart to equal yours."

In August 1790 Nicol wrote to Robert Ainslie lampooning Burns for his ambition for promotion in the Excise and his revelling in pride when he achieved it. He was however wrong about the level of promotion: "To the pride of applauded genius is now superadded the pride of office. He was lately raised to the dignity of an Examiner of Excise, which is a step preparative to attaining that of a supervisor." Nicol also wrote and encouraged Burns to restrain his expression of his political views, only to receive a humorous letter in reply.

A concerned Nicol wrote to Burns regarding the 'Ca Ira' affair at the Dumfries theatre that came close to the poet losing his job, saying "Dear Christless Bobbie, What has become of thee? Has the Devil flown off with thee, as the gled does with a bird? If he should do so there is little matter if the reports concerning thy imprudence are true."

In May 1795 Burns wrote to George Thomson commenting on the artist David Allan's accurate depiction of him in an engraving of 'The Cotter's Saturday Night.' Burns added that he had named the small urchin boy chasing the cat's tail 'Willie Nocol' after his schoolmaster friend.

Burns transcribed one of his letters to Nicol into the Glenriddell Manuscripts.

== See also ==
- Robert Aiken
- Jean Armour
- Lesley Baillie
- John Ballantine
- Alison Begbie
- Nelly Blair
- Isabella Burns
- May Cameron
- Mary Campbell (Highland Mary)
- Jenny Clow
- Gavin Hamilton (lawyer)
- Helen Hyslop
- Nelly Kilpatrick
- Jessie Lewars
- Anne Rankine
- Isabella Steven
- Peggy Thompson
- James Smith (draper)
- John Murdoch (teacher)
