= Robert Ainslie (lawyer) =

Scottish lawyer (1766–1838)

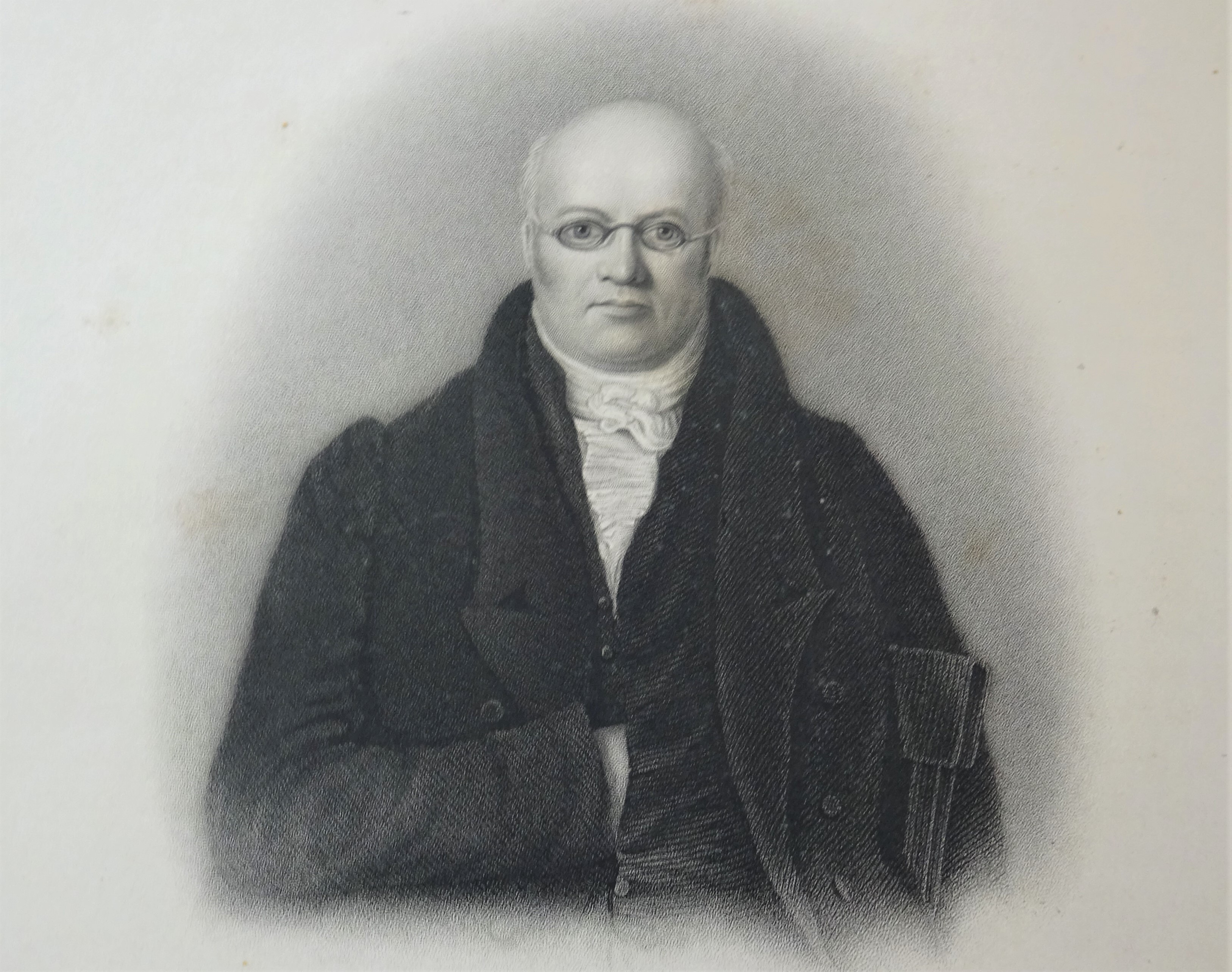
- Robert Ainslie
- Born: 13 March 1766; Duns, Scottish Borders
- Died: 11 April 1838 (aged 72); Canongate, Edinburgh
- Occupation: Lawyer or Writer to the Signet

Robert Ainslie (1766–1838) was a Scottish lawyer, and one of Robert Burns's long-term friends from his Edinburgh days. He was probably the closest confidant of Burns, whom he met first at a Masonic or Crochallan Fencibles event. Ainslie accompanied the poet on the first part of his Border Tour. Robert's father, also Robert, was a lawyer a bailie at Duns and a land-steward on Lord Douglas's Berwickshire estates. Robert married Jean Cunningham on 22 December 1798.

== Life and character ==
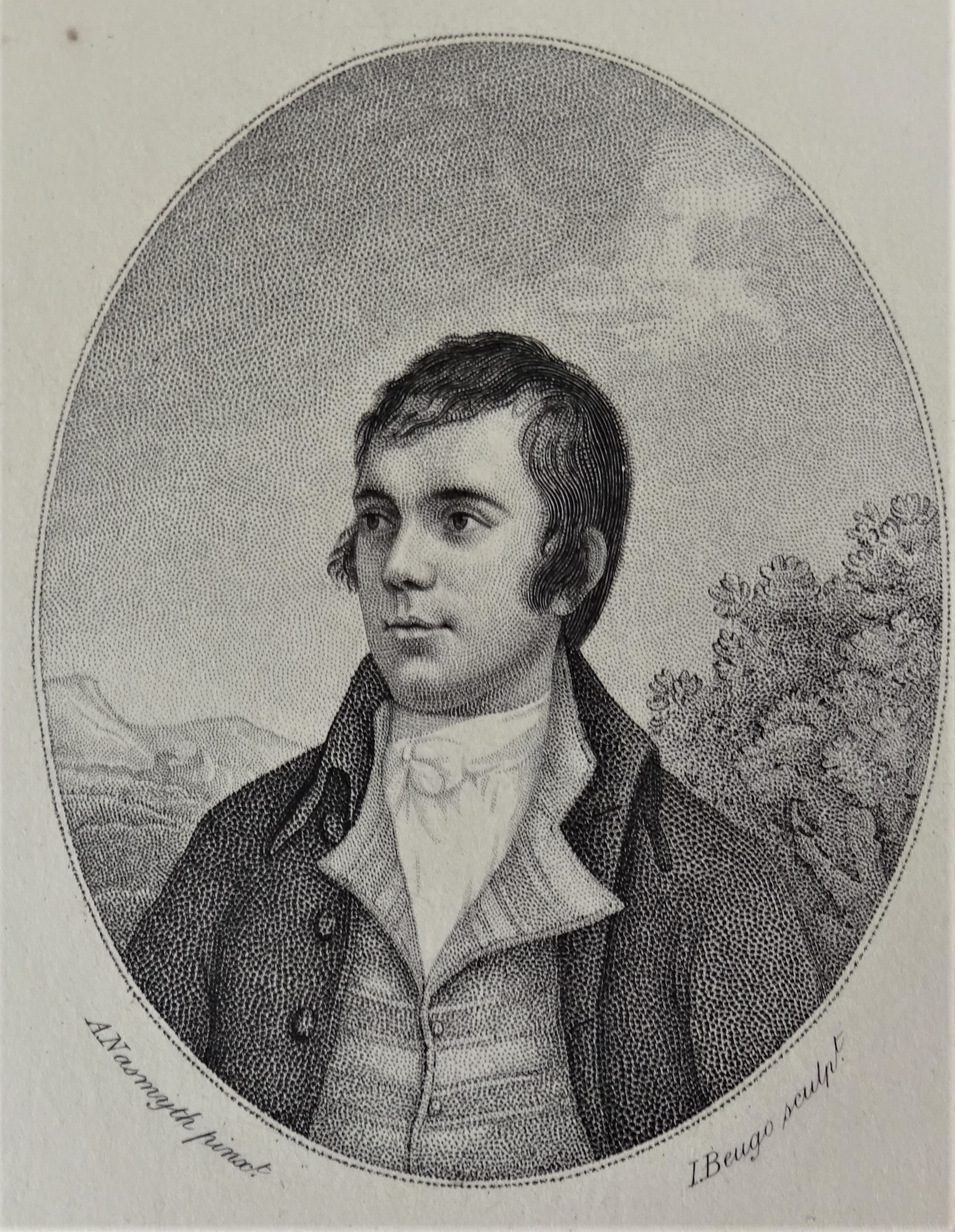
Robert Burns. A facsimile by Maclure and Macdonald from John Beugo's engraving.

He was the son of Robert Ainslie, "factor to Mr Hay of Drummelzier", and his wife Katherine Whitelaw, daughter of John Whitelaw of Whitelaw, East Lothian; he was born at Berrywell House near Duns in 1766.

Whitelaw Ainslie (born 1763) was a younger brother. Other siblings were Douglas b. 23.10.1769 (died in infancy), Douglas b. 06.05.1771, James b. circa 1772 and one sister Rachael, b. 19.03.1768. She was the subject of a poetic ditty from Burns after she had listened to a sermon by Dr Bowmaker the parish minister. Writing in pencil on the blank leaf of her bible that "Fair maid, you need not take the hint, nor idle text pursue: 'twas guilty sinners that he meant, not angels such as you." He hoped to set her mind at ease after the minister's sermon on the terrors of hellfire for the sinner and her searching her bible for the text. He is reported to have added that the minister was referring to him, adding that "I am found out wherever I go."

In 1788 Ainslie became a Writer to the Signet, aged only 22, after Samuel Mitchelson died. He had joined Carruber's Close on the north side of High Street, Edinburgh, Mitchelson's law office, as law student. Ainslie's own office as a Writer to the Signet was in the Edinburgh New Town at Hill Street; and he also had a country estate at Edingham in the Stewartry of Kirkcudbright.

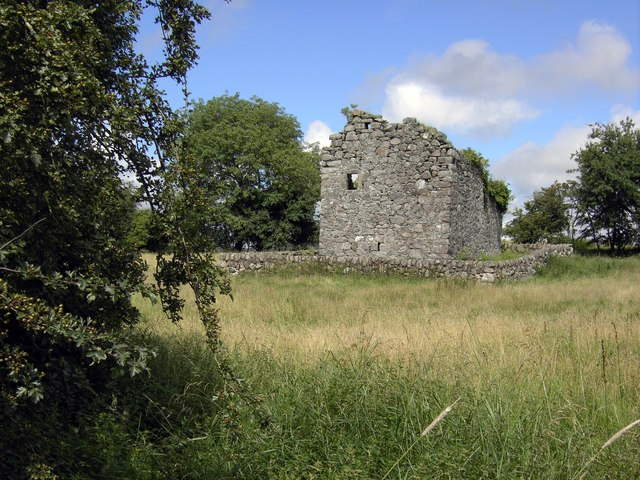
Edingham Castle near Robert Ainslie's estate.

Robert Heron said of Ainslie that he was "[...] a gentleman of the purest and most correct manners, who was accustomed sometimes to soothe the toils of a laborious profession, by an occasional converse with polite literature, and with general science." Hogg spoke of him as "honest Ainslie", commenting that one his failings was constitutional sleepiness, the irresistibility of which Hogg illustrated by stating that he has "seen him fall fast asleep in the blue parlour at Ambrose's, with North in the chair and myself croupier." In later life he became an Elder of the Church of Scotland.

He took on Agnes McLehose's son Andrew as an apprentice; he later became a Writer to the Signet.

== Death ==
Ainslie died in 1838, aged 71, in Canongate. Edinburgh. He is buried in St. Cuthbert's Churchyard. His memorial inscription reads:

Sacred to the memory of Robert Ainslie, Writer to the Signet who was born at Berrywell near Duns on 13th. January 1767 and died at Edinburgh on 11th. April 1838 in the 72nd. year of his age. This memorial is erected by his disconsolate widow, Isabella Munro, daughter of the late Rev. Robert Munro, Ullapool Ross-shire.

== Association with Robert Burns ==
Dugald Stewart commented that Burns was keeping "not very select society". He meant that Alexander Cunningham, Peter Hill, Robert Ainslie and others in Burns's circle, while respectable, were not of the literati. Ainslie, training to be a lawyer, became a close friend of both Cunningham and Burns; a common enjoyment of wine, women and Burns's songs, together with membership of the Freemasons and the Crochallan Fencibles drew Burns and Ainslie into each other's company in January 1787, and a long friendship was established. As a student Ainslie lived at No.6, St James's Square in Edinburgh and his near neighbours were George Thomson the music publisher, the artist John Beugo, the engraver and Alexander Nasmyth the painter, all of whom were more or less closely associated with Burns's career. Ainslie was 21, seven years younger than Burns, when they met. He is listed as a subscriber to two copies in Burns's Poems, Chiefly in the Scottish Dialect of 1787.

One day when Burns visited, Ainslie suggested that they spend the afternoon sharing a bottle of port. Burns retorted that to waste a beautiful afternoon dozing under the influence would be insufferable. The two men walked over Arthur's Seat. On their return they ate and had tea together and Ainslie commented that never had Burns been more instructive, amusing and such good company.

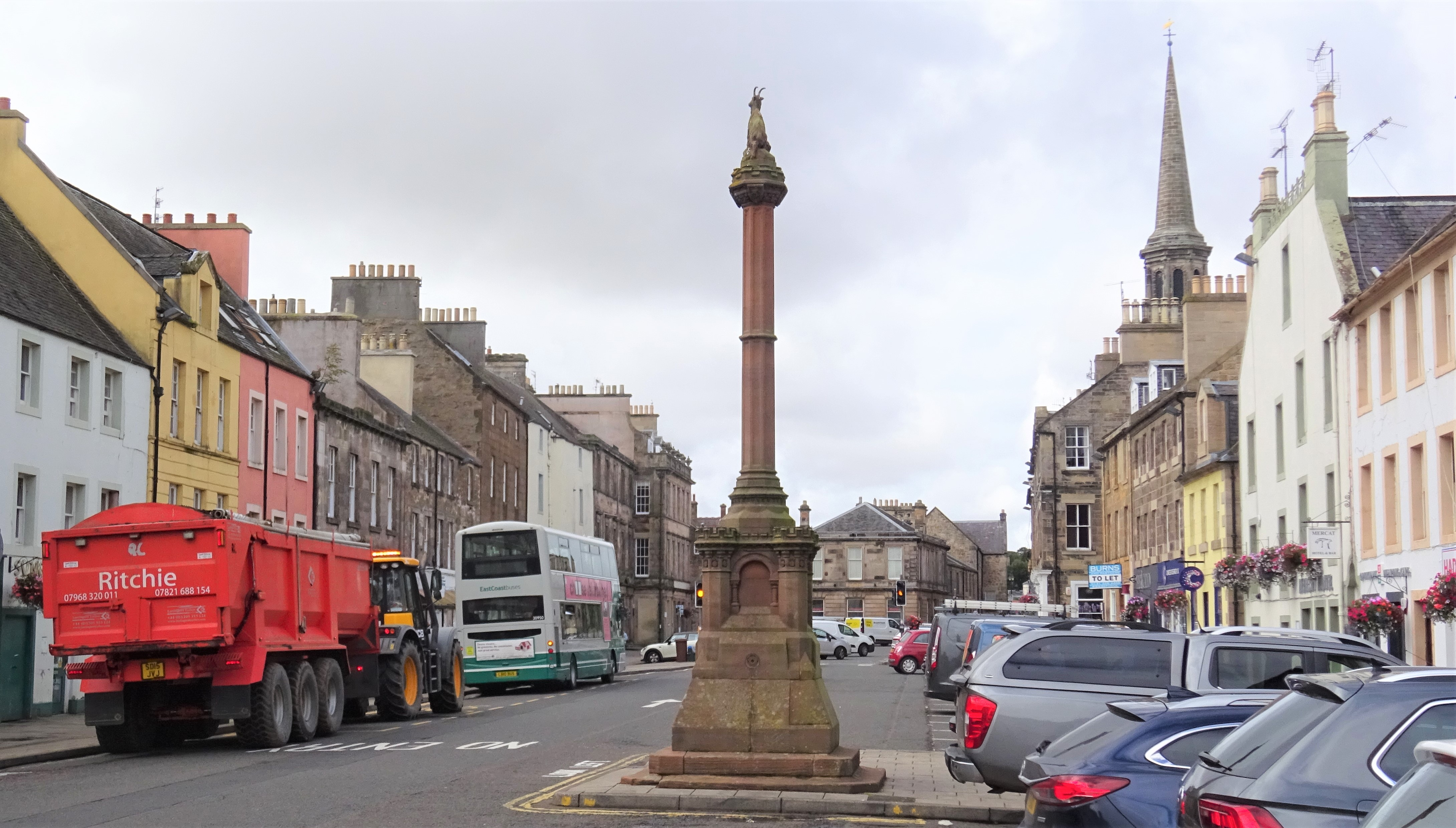
Burns and Ainslie passed through Haddington on their way to Duns.

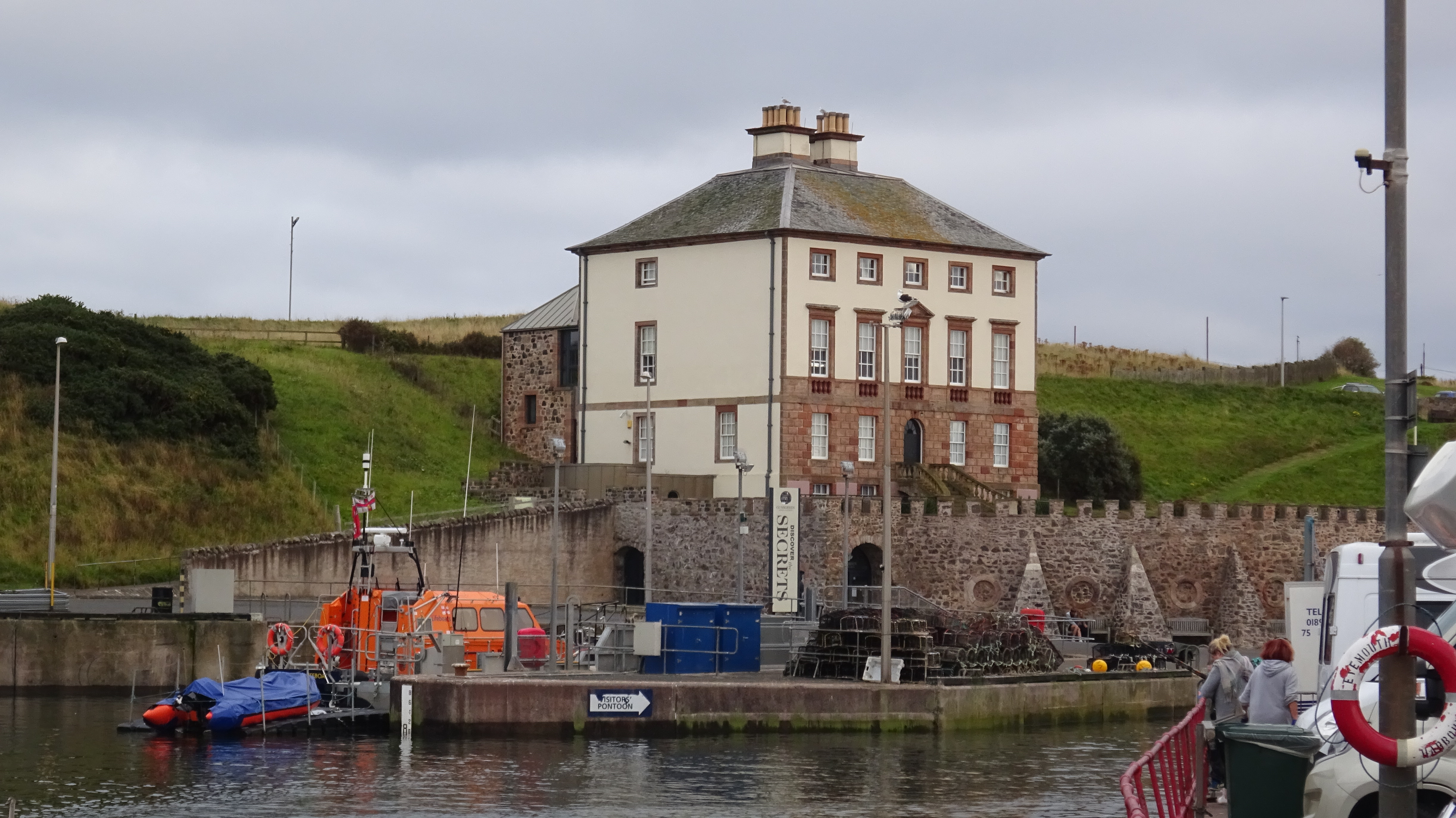
Gunsgreen House, Eyemouth

Following Burns's death Gilbert Burns wrote to Ainslie:"I could not help considering the fame of author as well as the respectability and peace of his friends in considerable danger from the publication of letters written on private and confidential subjects." He was concerned that the antiquarian and author, Cromek, had obtained many of Burns's letters and requested that when Ainslie was in London he should call upon Cromek and report back.

=== Border tour 1787 ===
Ainslie, having been granted two weeks leave, accompanied Burns on his travels and the pair left Edinburgh on 5 May 1787 beginning the first stage of the Borders Tour. At Eyemouth they both were inducted as Royal Arch Masons at St Abb's Lodge: Ainslie had to pay a fee but Burns was excused on account of his poetic genius. Ainslie had been Initiated into Scottish Freemasonry in Lodge Holyrood House (St Luke's), No.44, on 12 December 1783; Burns had been Initiated in a Masonic Lodge in Tarbolton, Ayrshire, in 1781.

At Coldstream Ainslie suggested that Burns should cross to England for the first time in his life. Ainslie crossed first, followed by Burns who fell to his knees and is said to have quoted the last two patriotic verses of "The Cotter's Saturday Night" -

"O Scotia! my dear, my native soil!
For whom my warmest wish to Heaven is sent!
Long may thy hardy sons of rustic toil
Be blest with health, and peace, and sweet content!
And O! may Heaven their simple lives prevent
From Luxury's contagion, weak and vile!
Then, howe'er crowns and coronets be rent,
A virtuous populace may rise the while,
And stand a wall of fire around their much-lov'd Isle."

Etc.

Burns at Duns met Ainslie's family and described Robert Ainslie senior as an "uncommon character", informed on matters relating to "Agriculture, natural philosophy and politics." He also commented in his sporadic Border's Journal on Ainslie's sister Rachel, saying that "My bardship's heart got a brush from Miss Betsey'; I could grasp her with a rapture on a bed of straw, and rise with contentment to the most sweltering drudgery of stiffening labour."

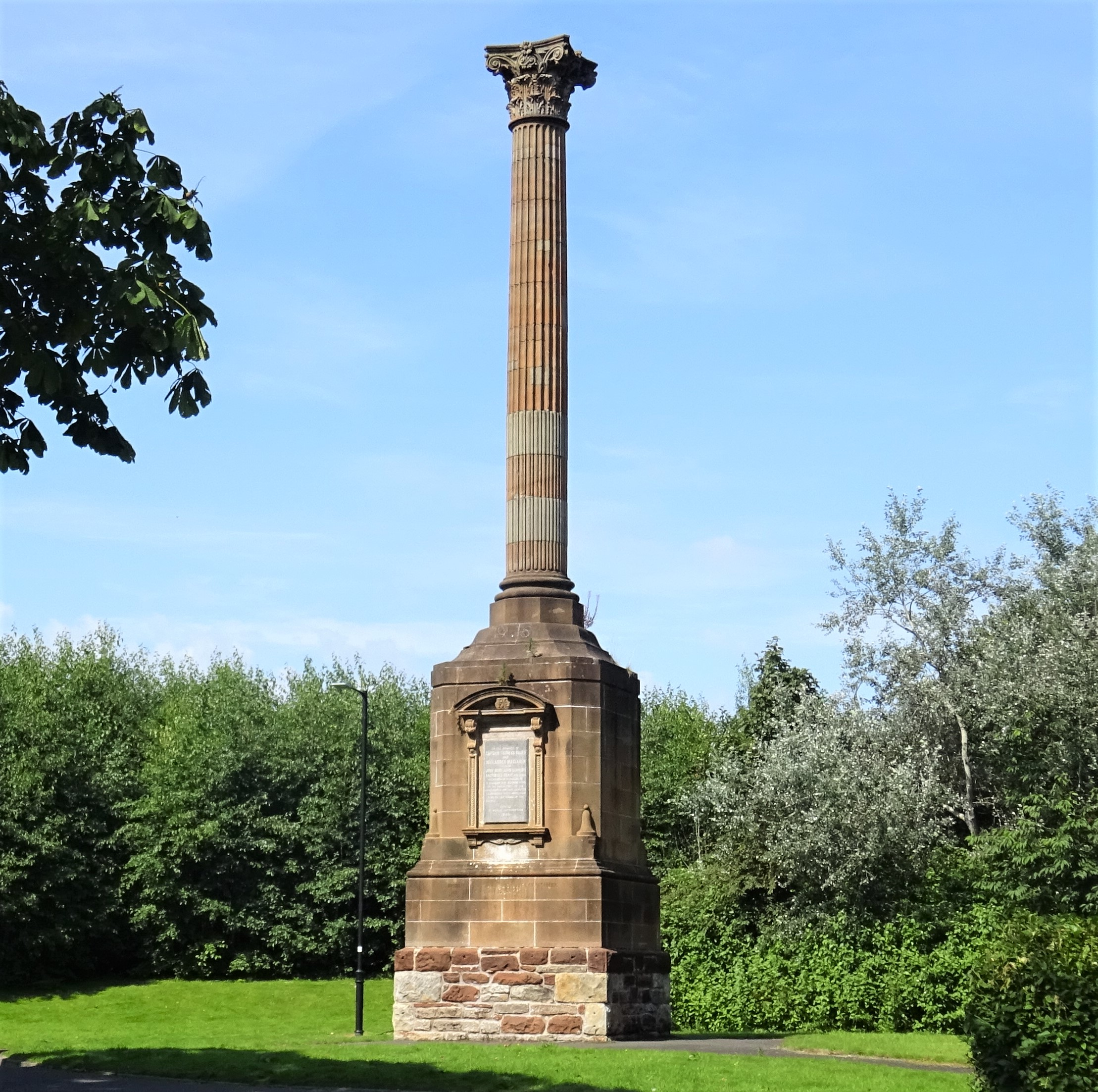
Reformers Memorial, Kilmarnock. Burns was a covert member of the Society of Friends.

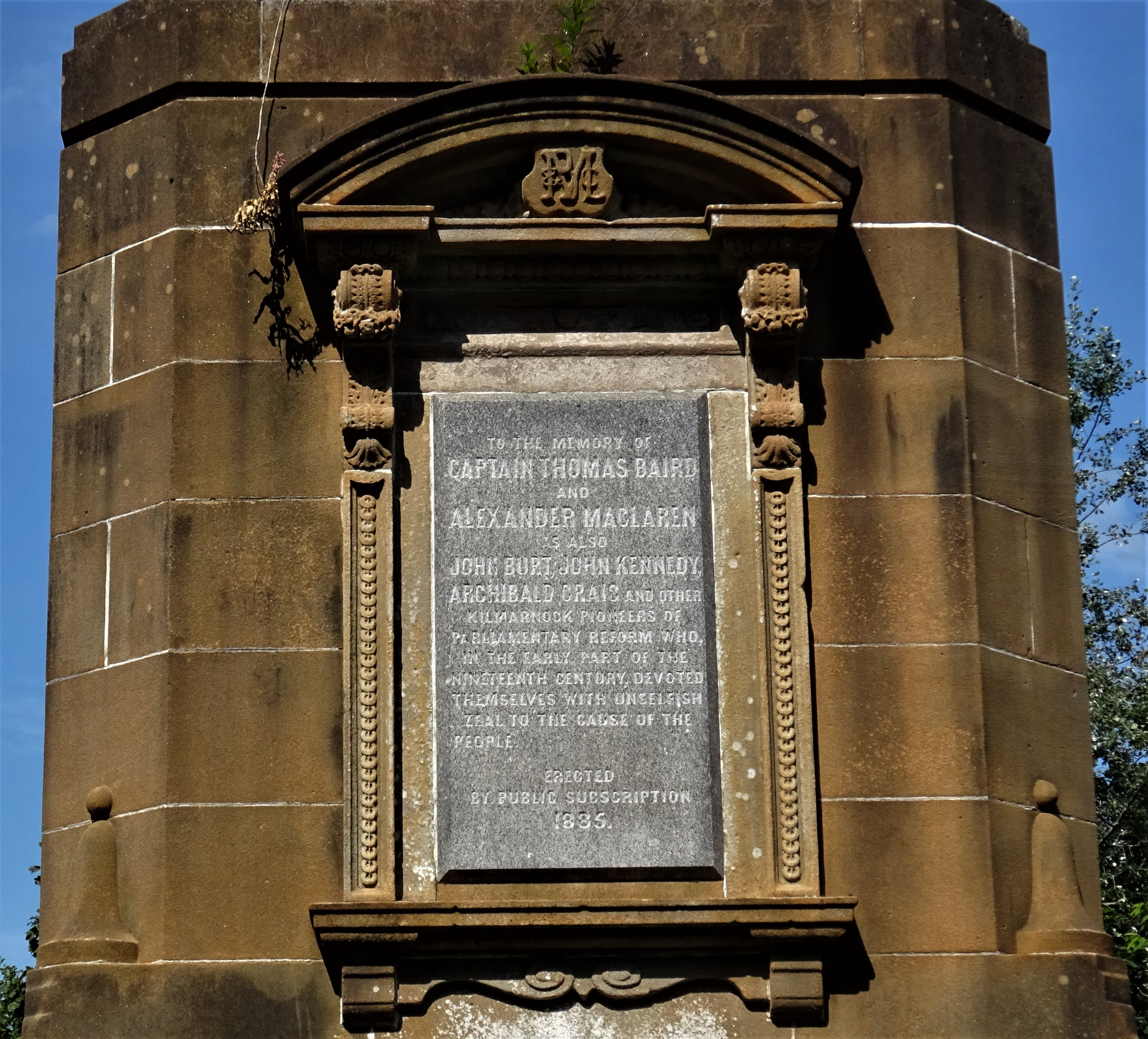
Reformers Memorial. The leaders were treated with great severity by the government.

=== Confidences ===
Burns introduced Ainslie to Agnes Maclehose and he was privy to details of their relationship. Ainslie became her lawyer and for several years kept her informed as her confidant of much relevant information. It was Ainslie for instance who broke the news to Agnes of Burns's marriage. The lawyer's relationship with Agnes is open to question as in a letter to Agnes he states "end of the week which you appointed as the Termination of my Banishment."

As a friend of both Agnes and Robert the Jenny Clow affair was difficult for Ainslie, however he may have been involved in the writ in "meditatione fugae" taken out against Burns by Jenny, who was Agne's maid, to prevent him emigrating, etc.

Burns visited his son Robert, by Jenny Clow, in Haddington whilst on a visit to Edinburgh. Agnes Maclehose told Ainslie at this time to inform him that she would not even go near her window when he was in town "lest even a glance of me should occur in the street." Burns wrote acknowledging this on 9 March 1789.

In August 1790 his friend William Nicol wrote to Ainslie lampooning Burns for his ambition for promotion in the Excise and his revelling in pride when he achieved it : "... To the pride of applauded genius is now superadded the pride of office. He was lately raised to the dignity of an Examiner of Excise, which is a step preparative to attaining that of a supervisor."

Ainslie reported to Agnes Maclehose on 18 October 1790 that Burns in September or early October had suffered a bout of Quinsy, a rare and potentially serious complication of tonsillitis where an abscess forms between one of the tonsils and the wall of the throat.

Calling in at Dunlop House in October 1790 Ainslie gave Frances Dunlop a part of the draft of 'Tam o'Shanter'. Agnes was so enthusiastic about this work that Ainslie later sent her the entire text and she soon wrote to Burns in admiration of it. Ainslie later presented a manuscript copy of Tam o'Shanter to Sir Walter Scott.

On 15 October 1791 Ainslie visited Burns and Jean Armour at Ellisland Farm at kirn-nicht or harvest home, although he never mentions it in his correspondence and in fact they essentially ceased any correspondence for two years after the visit. Ainslie wrote to Agnes Maclehose in a derogatory vein ragearding Jean's coarse manners and drab appearance, also saying that although Burns still met with important people, Jean was ignored by all. He said that Ellisland as a farm was "ill contrived and ... and pretty dirty" and went on comment that Jean was "Vulgar and common-place in a high degree - and pretty round and fat ... a kind Body in her own way, and her husband Tolerably Attentive to her." He was equally unimpressed by Burns's visitors "a Vulgar looking Tavern Keeper from Dumfries; and his wife, more vulgar - Mr Millar of Dalswinton's Gardener and his Wife - and said wife's sister - and a little fellow from Dumfries, who had been a clerk."

He commented also that "One day he sits down and writes a beautiful poem - and the next seize a cargo of tobacco from some unfortunate smuggler, or roups out some poor wretch for selling liquors without a licence." Jean was heavily pregnant with William Nicol Burns at the time. The reality of his friend's life was clearly a shock to Ainslie.

Writing a few years after Burns's death Ainslie commented on his friends difficulties over dabbling in politics whilst employed as an Excise Officer: -

"The Commissioners of Excise, irritated at his opinions, wrote him a formal official letter, sealing with the large seal of office, informing him that a 'petty officer' had 'no business with politics.' The proud heart of Burns did not like this humbling, after a few wrathful words in secret to one of his friends, he took a pencil and wrote these lines on the envelope."

"In politics if thou would'st mix,
And mean thy fortunes be;
Bear this in mind, be deaf and blind,
Let Great folks hear and see."

Ainslie is said to have confirmed that Burns had been a covert member of the Society of the Friends of the People which strove for parliamentary reform until suppressed by the government.

It was Ainslie who visited Alexander Cunningham as a lawyer on behalf of Agnes Maclehose to demand the return of the letters that she had written to Burns.

== Correspondence with Burns ==
Over 20 letters from Burns to Ainslie have survived. On the other hand, all of Ainslie's letters to Burns were later acquired by Ainslie, who destroyed them. Burns shared with Ainslie many of his intimate thoughts, feelings and opinions and his friend was closely involved with some of his infidelities.

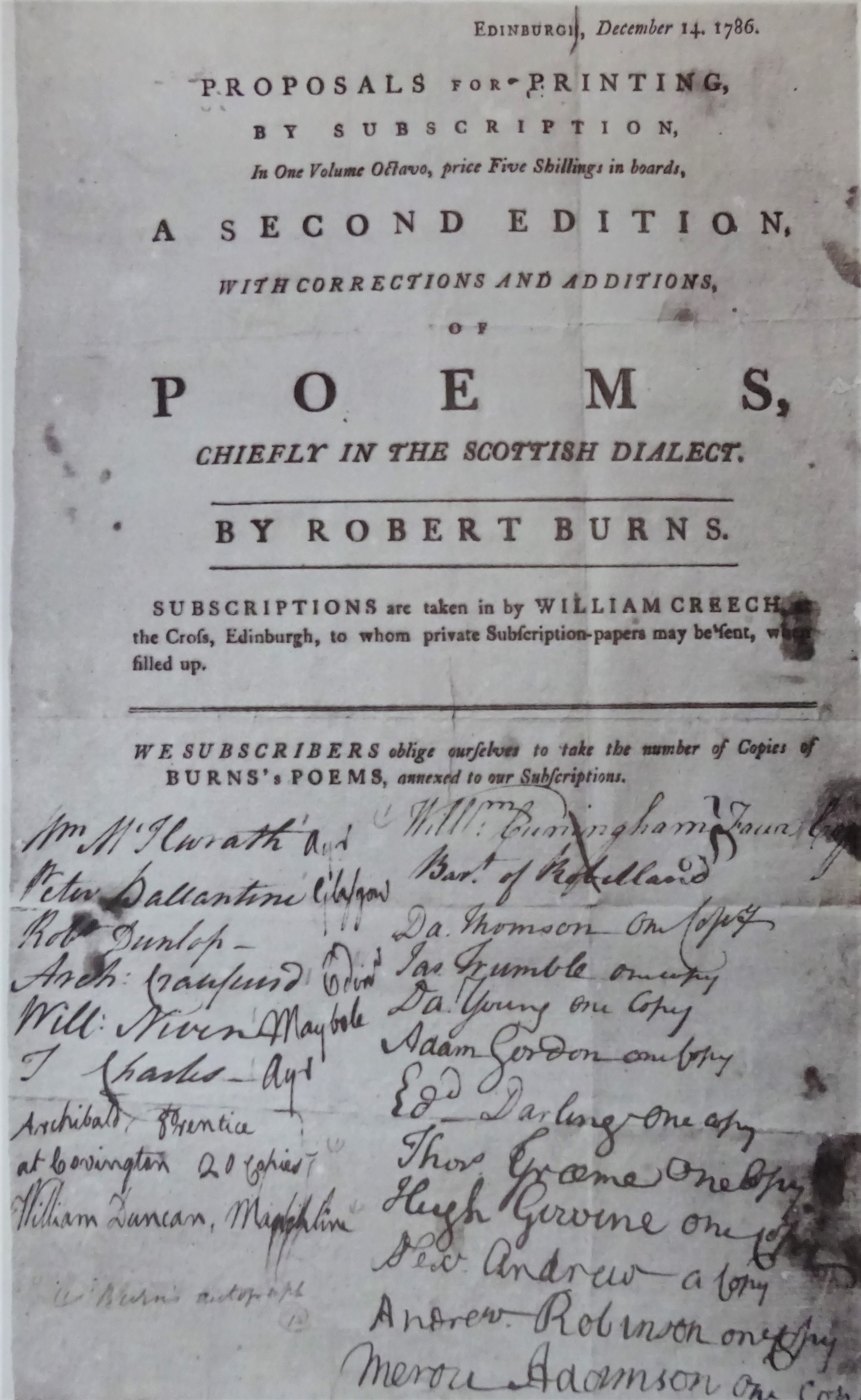
The Advertisement for the First Edinburgh Edition of 1787.

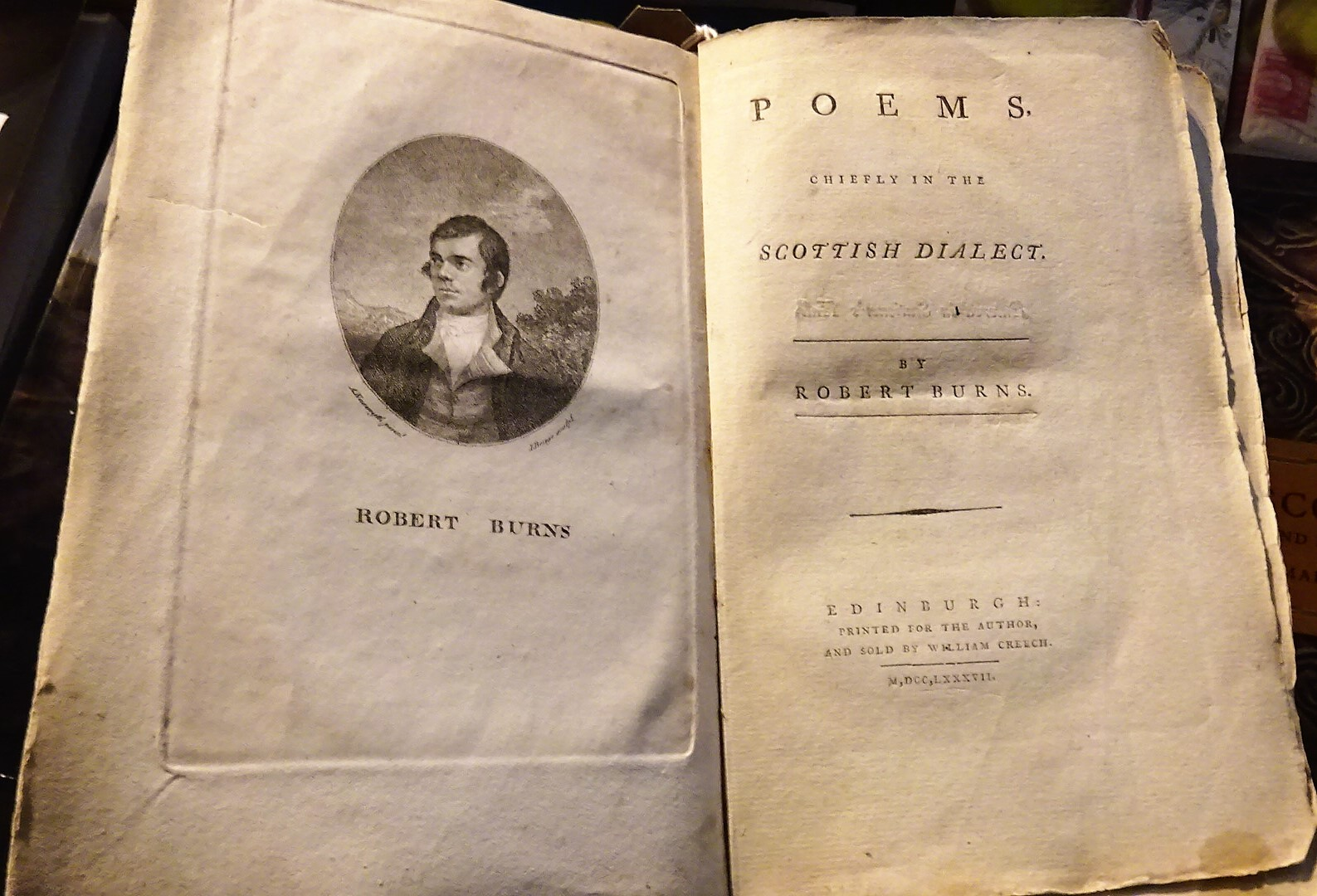
The First Edinburgh Edition of Burns's poems.

The infamous 'horse litter' letter of 3 March 1788 is one of a number that Ainslie made available for publication, despite's Ainslie's religious ideals, greatly tarnishing the poet's reputation in the process, more than any other of Burns's friends. The date of release of the letter and who released it requires confirmation.

The 'Burns-Ainslie Correspondence' is a collection of letters in private hands that contains several unpublished letters and two new poems. They are in transcript and not in Burns's hand and were held by John Spottiswood and his family for over a century.

On 23 July 1787, writing from Mauchline, he said of Ainslie "There is one thing for which I set great store by you as a friend, and it is this - that I have not a friend upon earth, beside yourself, to whom I can talk nonesense without forfetting some degree of his esteem."

The sentiments "You assume a proper length of face in my bitter hours of blue-devilism (depression), and you laugh fully up to my highest wishes at my good things. I don't know upon the whole if you are one of the first fellows in God's world, but you are so to me." Burns wrote this on 23 September 1787.

It seems that from a letter to Ainslie on 2 March 1788 that Burns had negotiated a reconciliation between Jean Armour and her mother so that she would be able to attend her daughter during her confinement.

Burns wrote to Ainslie on 3 March 1788 in regard of renting Ellisland Farm. He was accompanied by James Tennant of Glenconner, his "auld comrade dear and brither sinner." Burns rated him as "the most intelligent, sensible fsrmer in the county" and took his advice to take on Ellisland, a choice that he was soon to regret.

The infamous 'horse litter' letter was written on 3 March 1788 to Ainslie. The original letter may be the one that the antiquarian book-seller James Stillie and a group of friends purchased for £4 and put into the fire in an attempt to protect the bards reputation. Ainslie destroyed his correspondence to Burns, so the full context of this unfortunate letter is not known. The Merry Muses contains the full text of the letter. Stillie commented that "This Ainslie was one of Burns' worst enemies, and an odious character."

On 26 May 1788 Burns wrote to announce his marriage to Jean, saying "I have the pleasure to tell you that I have been extremely fortunate in all my buyings and bargainings hitherto; Mrs Burns not excepted, which title I now avow to the world. I am truly pleased with this last affair: it has indeed added to my anxieties for Futurity but it has given a stability to my mind & resolutions, unknown before; and the poor girl has the most sacred enthusiasm of me, and has not a wish but to gratify my every idea of her deportment.!!!"

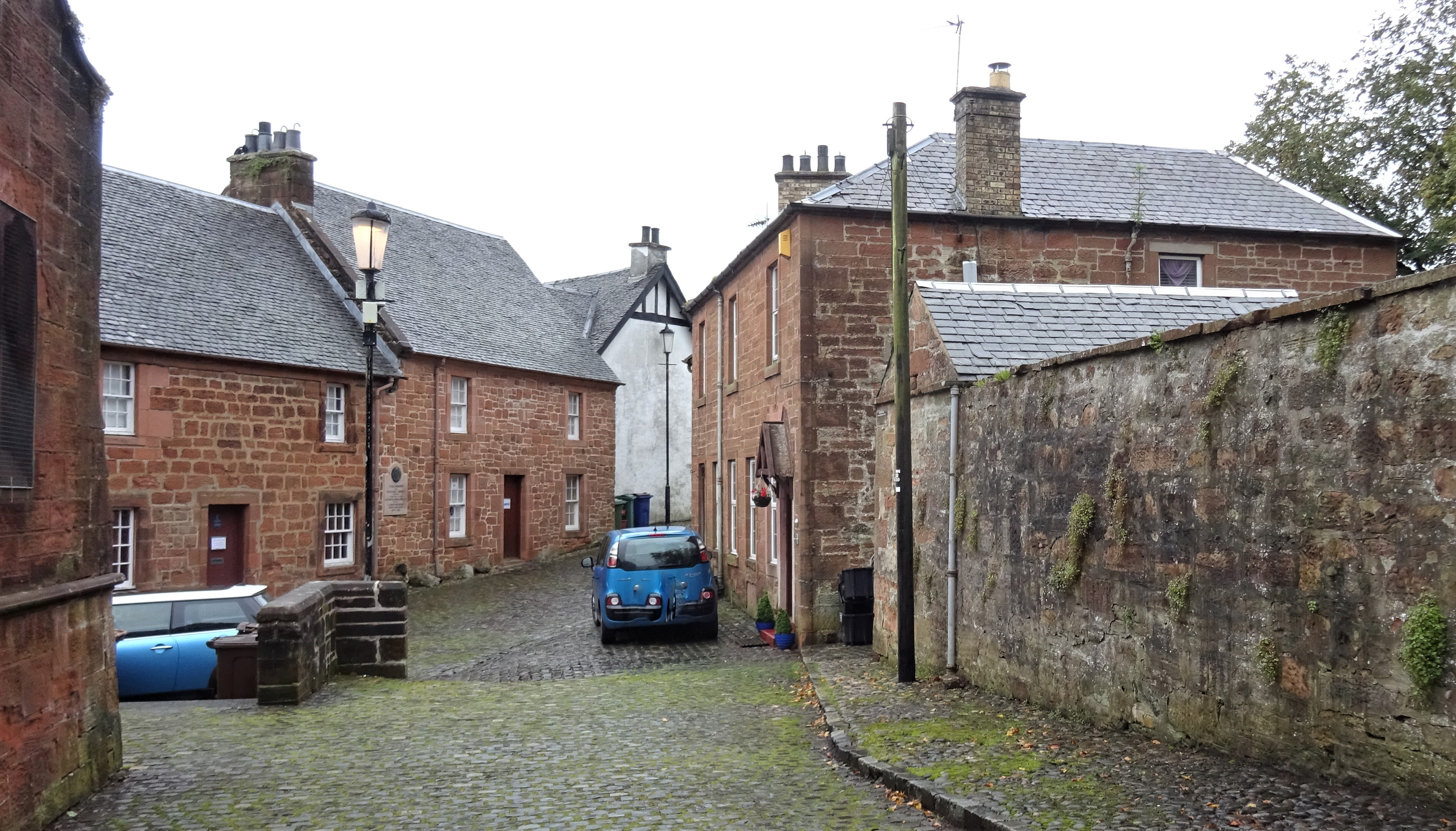
Dr Mackenzie's house in Mauchline where Burns rented a room for Jean Armour's confinement.

Burns wrote in 1788 in an undated and unsigned note to Ainslie regarding May Cameron, a servant girl who had fallen pregnant to Burns and had lost her job as a consequence. Burns asked him to: "send for the wench and give her ten or twelve shillings... and advise her out to some country (friends)... Call immediately, or at least as soon as it is dark, for God's sake lest the poor soul be starving. — Ask her for a letter I wrote her just now, by way of token " Burns added the telling instruction, "but don't for Heaven's sake meddle with her as a Piece. I insist on this, on your honor. You may not perhaps not like the business, but I just tax your friendship thus far".

On 23 June 1788 Robert informed Ainslie that he had arranged a sitting with John Miers to produce a profile or silhouette picture and that together with one of Lord Glencairn and Dr Blacklock he intended to hang them on his new mantlepiece at Ellisland Farm. To his great annoyance Burns had to repay Ainslie the cost of a sitting with Mr John Mier's after a Mr Hamilton of Bangour in Ireland cheated Burns by charging the bill for his silhouette portrait to him.

On 30 June 1788 Robert Ainslie wrote and informed Burns that now Agnes Maclehose's servant girl, Jenny Clow was pregnant by him. Burns, as a married man, wished to keep this affair as quiet as possible, commenting that "There is a great degree of folly in talking unnecessarily of one's private affairs."

William Nicol was one of Burns's most irascible friends and following a careless remark to another mutual friend, William Cruikshank, Nicol threatened to have Burns "summonds to compear and declare" for passing on a very negative assessment of Nicol made by Agnes Maclehose. Burns wrote to Ainslie about this situation on 23 August 1788, the context being a court case that Nicol was fighting against a Dr. Adams.

On 6 January 1789 Burns wrote to Ainslie to say that he hoped to be Edinburgh in February to meet Jenny and to "settle the matter with her, and free her hand of the process." Jenny refused Burn's attempt to take the child off her hands.

In an unpublished letter, Burns commented to Ainslie regarding another extra-marital affair, this time with Ann Park, saying that he "proposed a Bill of Reform regarding his amours with the opposite sex, but he feared stiff opposition from the Lower House".

In 1789 Burns wrote of his attitude towards his job with the Excise, saying "I have the same consolation which I once heard a recruiting sergeant gave to his audience in the streets of Kilmarnock: 'Gentlemen for your further encouragement, I can assure you that ours is the most blackguard corps under the crown, and, consequently, with us an honest fellow has the surest chance of preferment.'"

Circa May 1792 Burns wrote to Ainslie at a very low ebb "... My wife scolds me, my business torments me, and my sins come staring me in the face, every one telling a more bitter tale than his fellow. When I tell you that even Bawdry has lost its power to please, you will guess something of my hell within, and all around me."

On 26 April 1793 Burns wrote again in a depressed mood and included a witty story of a subscriber to the reading library he was involved in to whom he "advised him, instead of turning over the leaves, to bind the book on his back." As a result the subscriber took to carrying heavy tomes on his back in the expectation of somehow absorbing their wisdom.

In 1794 Burns in a letter to Agnes Maclehose he commented that Ainslie's last letter was "so dry, so distant, so like a card to one of his clients, that I could scarce bear to read it, and have not yet answered it."

== Works ==
Ainslie published:

- Practical Observations for the Landed and Agricultural Interest on the Question of Corn and Money: In a Series of Letters, as from a Plain Man (1816)
- A Father's Gift to his Children (1818), devotional.
- The Life, Adventures & Serious Remonstrances of a Scotch Guinea Note (1826), as the author of the "Letters of a Plain Man". This work is identified by Brian Reffin Smith as a typical it-narrative. The book contained a reply to "E. Bradwardine Waverley", a pseudonym used by John Wilson Croker in controversy that year with Sir Walter Scott on currency questions. Ainslie gave Scott a manuscript copy by Burns of the poem Tam o' Shanter.
- Reasons for the Hope that is in Us (1831), devotional.

He wrote also for the Edinburgh Review and other publications.

== Family ==
Ainslie fathered an illegitimate son with a Innerleithen girl. According to William Scott Douglas, Burns sent him the poem Robin Shure in Hairst to fit the occasion. He added "Welcome, Sir, to the society, the venerable Society, of FATHERS!!!" He also suggested that his son's middle name should be 'Burns'.

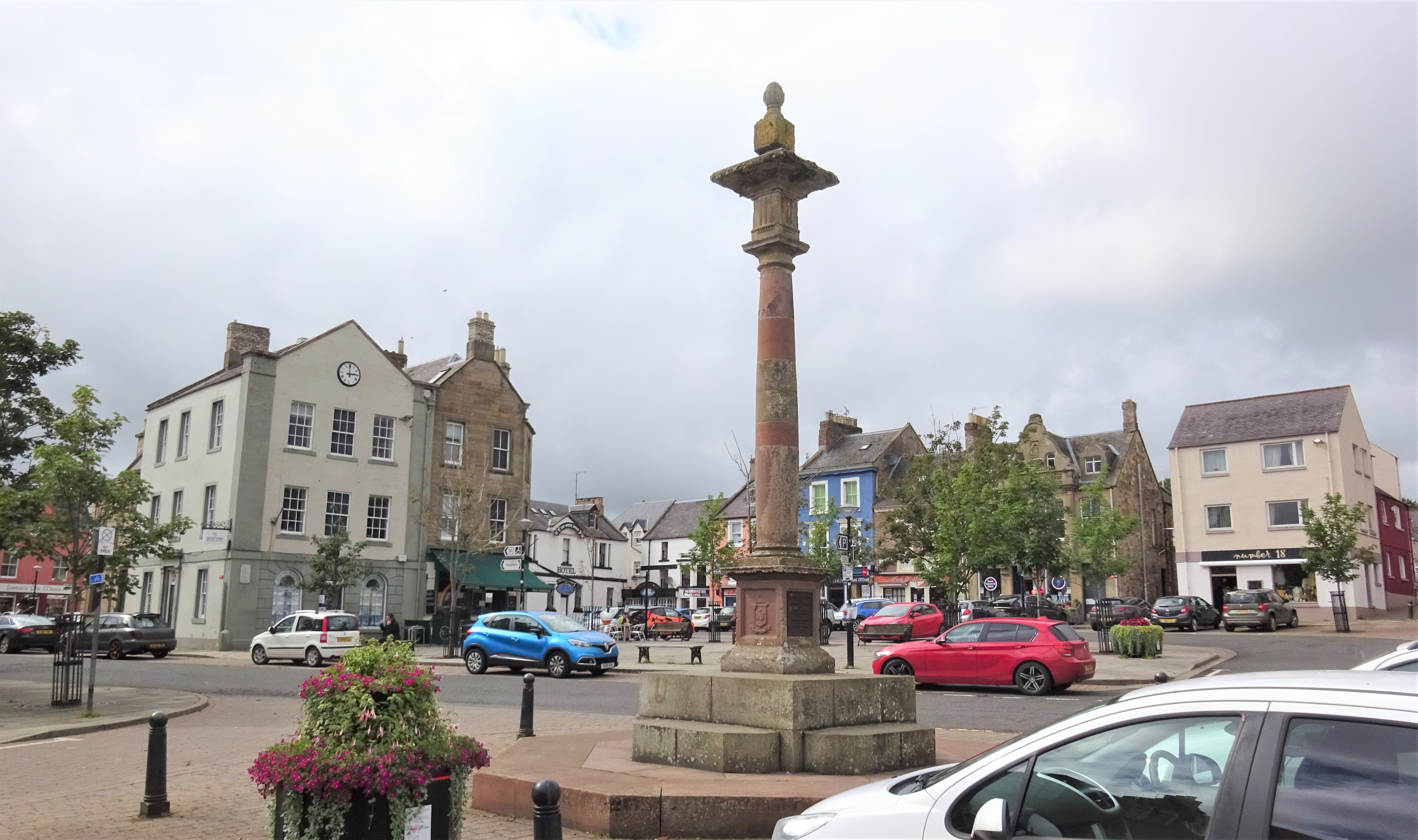
The centre of Duns, Ainslie's home town.

Ainslie married Jean Cunningham on 22 December 1798, two years after his friend's death, and they had one son and several daughters together. Jean's father was Lieutenant Colonel James Cunningham who had served in the Scots Brigade. After Jean's death aged 45 he married Isabella Munro, daughter of the Rev. Robert Munro, Ullapool. Burns had said of Ainslie that

You will make a noble fellow if once you were married. I make no reservation of your being well-married: you have so much sense and knowledge of human nature, that, though you may not realise perhaps the ideas of romance, yet you will never be ill-married.

== See also ==
- Robert Aiken
- Jean Armour
- John Ballantine
- Lesley Baillie
- Alison Begbie
- Nelly Blair
- Isabella Burns
- May Cameron
- Mary Campbell (Highland Mary)
- Jenny Clow
- Gavin Hamilton (lawyer)
- Helen Hyslop
- Nelly Kilpatrick
- Jessie Lewars
- William Nicol
- Anne Rankine
- Isabella Steven
- Peggy Thompson
