= William Craig, Lord Craig =

Scottish judge and essayist

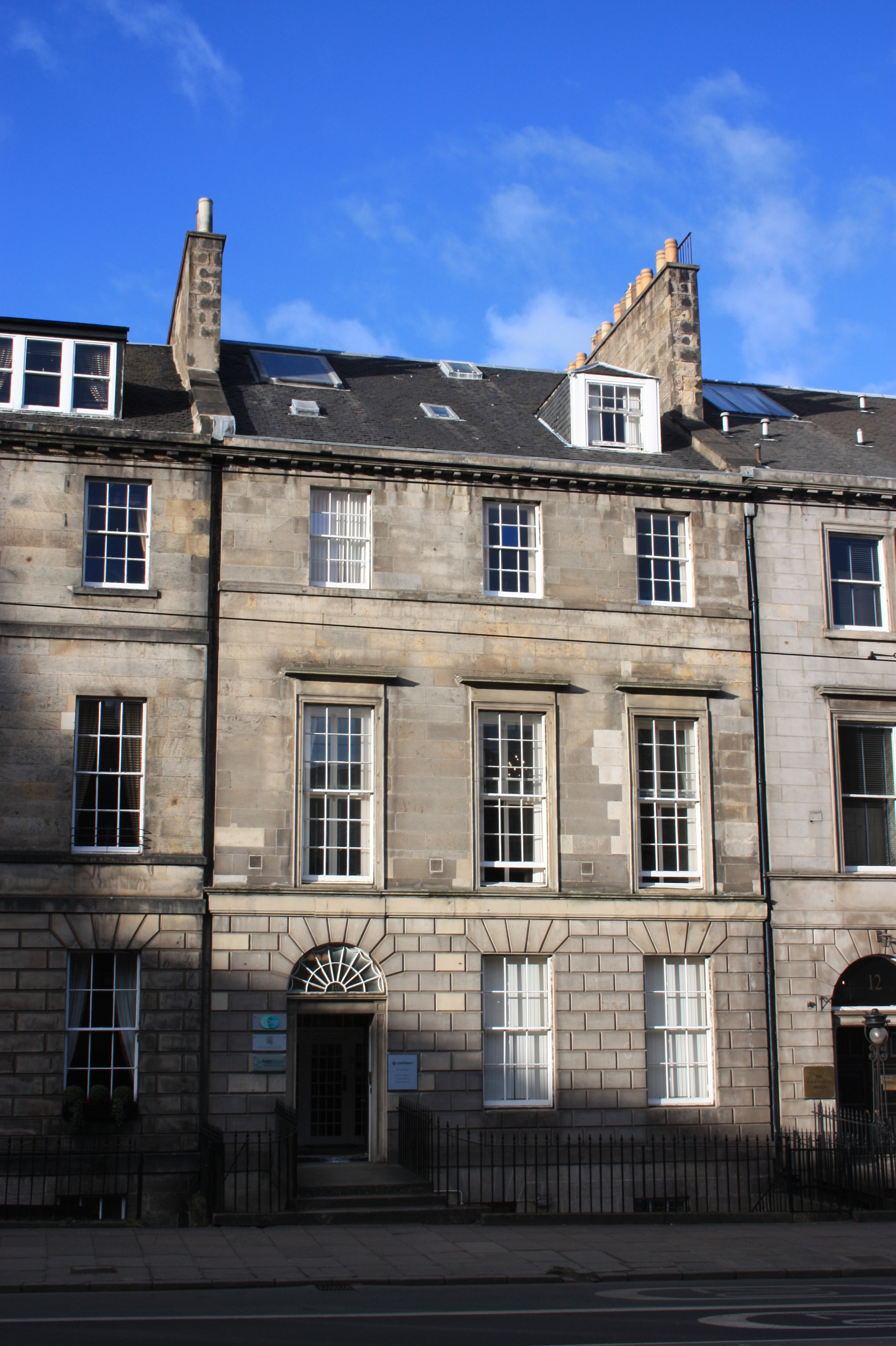
Craig's townhouse at 10 York Place, Edinburgh

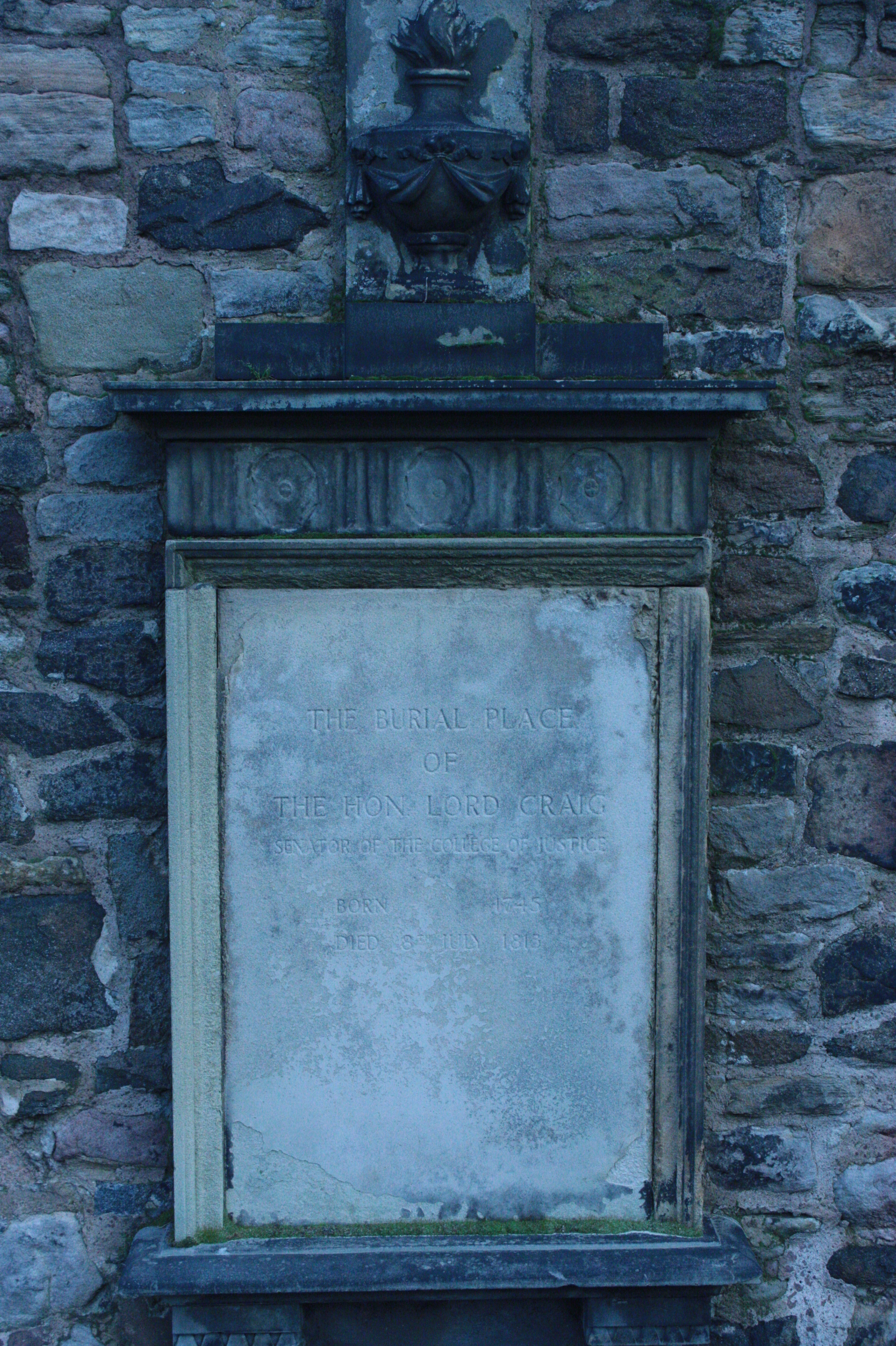
Lord Craig's grave, Canongate Kirkyard, Edinburgh

William Craig, Lord Craig FRSE LLD (1745–1813) was a Scottish judge and essayist.

== Life ==
He was born in Glasgow on 6 June 1745, the son of Rev William Craig DD (1709–1784) minister of St Andrew's Church in Glasgow.

He studied at both the University of Edinburgh and the University of Glasgow and graduated in Glasgow in 1763. He was admitted as an advocate at the Scottish bar in 1768. In 1784 he discharged the duties of advocate-depute along with Robert Blair and Alexander Abercromby; and in 1787 he became sheriff-depute of Ayrshire.

In 1783 he was a founder member of the Royal Society of Edinburgh.

For most of his life he lived on the west side of George Square in southern Edinburgh (then a new building) but he moved to York Place in the New Town when it was first built.

In 1792, on the death of Lord Hailes, Craig was raised to the bench with the title of Lord Craig, though he had not held a prominent position at the bar. In 1795 he succeeded Lord Henderland as a legal lord of the court of justiciary, a post which he held till 1812. He retained his office in the civil court till his death 8 July 1813.

He died at home, 10 York Place in the First New Town in Edinburgh and is buried against the eastmost boundary wall of Canongate Kirkyard on the Royal Mile in Edinburgh.

Craig's cousin, Robert Burns' muse, Agnes Maclehose, commonly known as "Clarinda" is buried next to him.

== Works ==
Craig was one of a group of advocates in literary society called the "Tabernacle", who met in a tavern to read essays. On the suggestion of Craig they started a periodical, The Mirror, and they changed into the "Mirror Club". William Creech published The Mirror, on Tuesdays and Saturdays, the first number appearing on Saturday 23 January 1779, and the 110th and last on 27 May 1780. After Henry Mackenzie the contributions of Craig were the most numerous, including a paper on the poems of Michael Bruce, in No. 36. Craig was also a contributor to the Lounger (1785–7), published by the same club.
