= Agnes Maclehose =

Scottish poet (1758-1841)

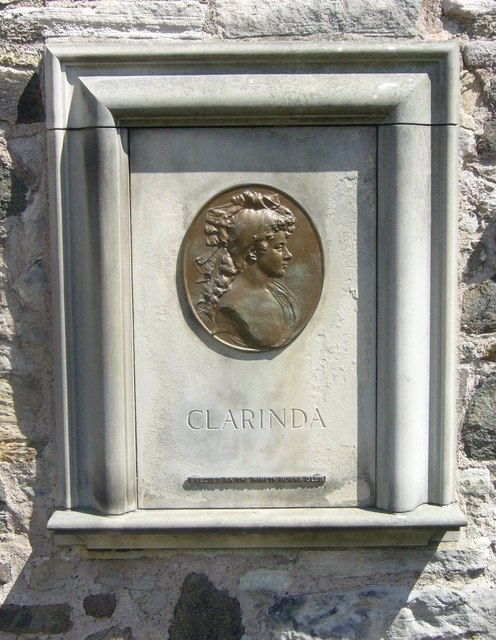
- Agnes Maclehose's memorial stone in Canongate Kirkyard by H S Gamley
- Born: 17 April 1759; Salt Market, Glasgow, Scotland
- Died: 22 October 1841 (aged 82); Edinburgh, Scotland
- Occupations: Poet, socialite, and wife

Agnes Maclehose (26 April 1758 – 23 October 1841), or Agnes Craig, known to her friends as Nancy and to Robert Burns followers as Clarinda, was a Scotswoman who had an unconsummated affair with Burns during 1787–1788, on which he based the 1791 song "Ae Fond Kiss". The pseudonyms of her "Clarinda" to his "Sylvander" were adopted by the pair for confidential correspondence purposes. Maclehose, used here throughout, has been various styled, including "McLehose", "MacLehose" and "M'Lehose".

== Life and character ==
Agnes was born in Glasgow, the third of four daughters of a prominent surgeon, Andrew Craig. Her mother was Christian Maclaurin or McLaurin (d. 1767), daughter of John Maclaurin, a minister of the Scottish church. Her sisters were Margaret (b. 27 January 1752), Lilias (b. 25 July 1754), and Mary (b. 11 May 1764). She was sent to a boarding-school in Edinburgh for six months to improve her handwriting and grammar when she was fifteen, by which time all her siblings except Margaret were dead. Agnes was a sickly child, however, from the age of five, her health improved and she developed into an exceptionally good-looking woman, being indeed the toast of Glasgow's Hodge Podge Club at the age of 15.

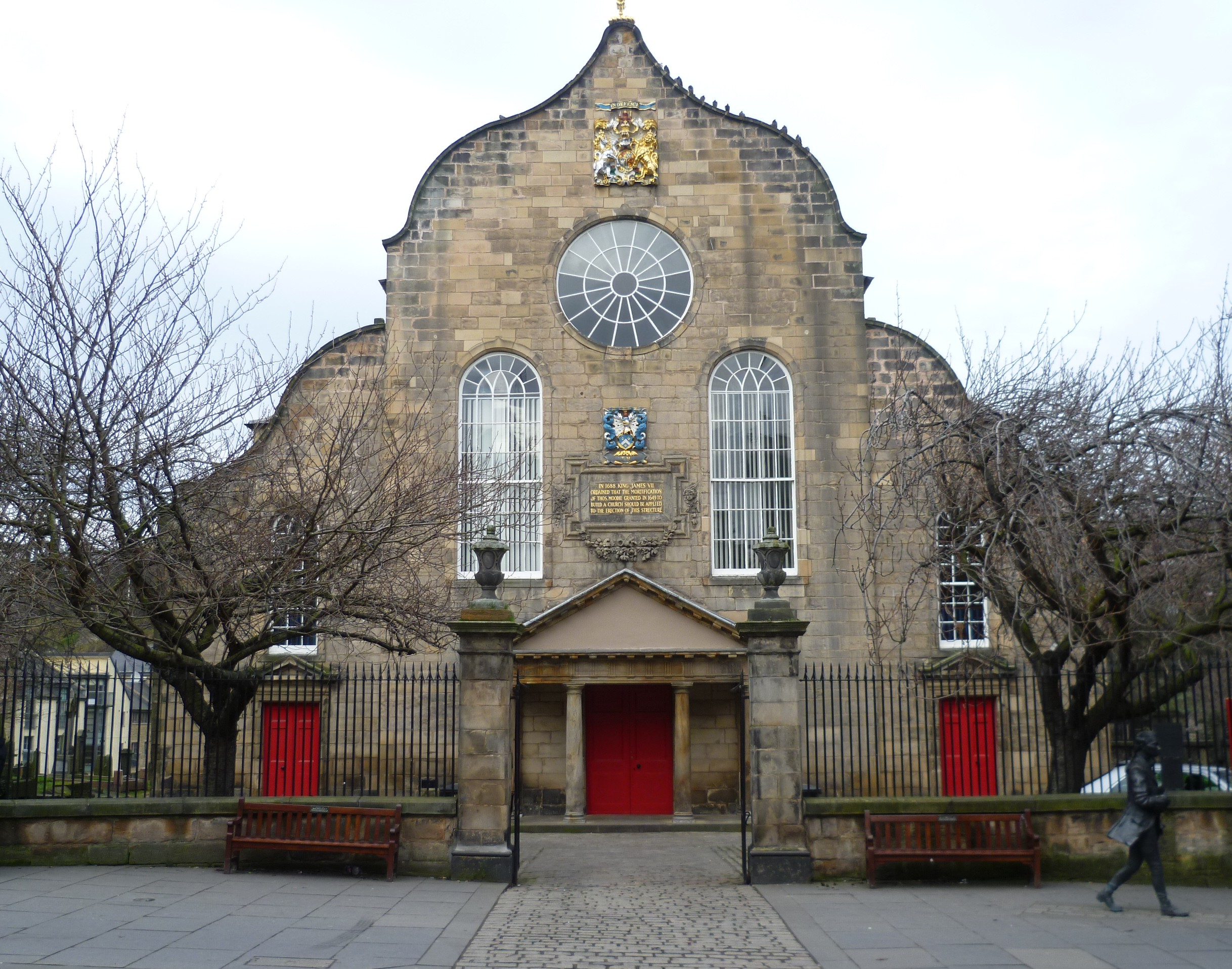
Canongate Kirk, the site of Agnes's burial.

Several of her ancestors had been ministers, and she herself was somewhat pious, mainly due to her mother's influence. The John Miers silhouette of her shows that she had large eyes, was slim, and had an ample bosom. She had blonde hair. In an age when it was not seen as necessary, or desirable, that women should receive much education, she was an exception to this rule. She had a poor formal education, but read widely and polished her conversational skills, which put her beyond the ordinary.

A young Glasgow lawyer, James Maclehose (c. 1754–1812), courted her. However, he was forbidden to enter the Craig family home by Agnes's father. James found ways of meeting with her, one of which was by making himself the only other occupant of a Glasgow to Edinburgh coach in which she was booked to travel for a ten-hour journey, by the simple expedient of purchasing all the other seats. In spite of the objections of her father and her first cousin William Craig (1745–1813), later Lord Craig, a Court of Session judge. Agnes married in Glasgow at the age of eighteen on 1 July 1776.

Agnes had four children in four years, one of whom, William (b. 1777) died in infancy. Shortly before the birth of the fourth, James (b. 21 April 1781) in December 1780, she formally left her husband because of his mental cruelty and depression, returning to her father in Glasgow's Saltmarket, whilst James ended up at first in a debtors' prison before emigrating to Jamaica in 1782, his wife having refused to accompany him after receiving a letter in which he wrote "For my part, I am willing to forget what is past, neither do I require an apology from you." James Maclehose took custody of their two sons, both under three at the time; he later took custody also of their youngest child, born a few months after the separation. They were later returned to her. One of her sons, Andrew, her only child to reach adulthood, became a Writer to the Signet in Edinburgh and helped support her in her old age.

On 13 May 1782, her father died after a long illness that had dissipated his savings. Agnes went to Edinburgh where she took a small flat in Generals Entry off Potterrow, living on a small annuity of £8, supplemented from time to time by gifts from her cousin, Lord Craig. She was first assisted by charitable contributions from the Writers in Glasgow (£10) and the Surgeons in Glasgow (£8), but these payments ceased when her husband was found to be financially secure. When Lord Craig died, he left her an annuity and made her son Andrew a residual legatee.

There is a plaque in her memory on a building on the corner of Potterrow and Marshall Street that reads, "Near this spot resided 'Clarinda' friend of Robert Burns 1787–1791", erected in 1937 by the Clarinda Burns Club.

In January 1791, Agnes attempted a reconciliation with her husband, sailing aboard the Roselle to Kingston, Jamaica. James was not on the quayside to meet her, and she found that her place had been taken by Ann Chalon Rivvere, his Black mistress, who had borne him a daughter, Arm Lavinia Maclehose. She returned to Scotland in April 1791 when the same ship returned home, having found the heat exhausting and the mosquito bites unbearable. Her cousin, Lord Craig, may have insisted upon her journey in order to avoid further scandal with Robert Burns. In a memoir written after her death, her grandson claimed that James Maclehose's mistreatment of his slaves – and his wife's discovery that he kept a slave mistress – were the decisive factors in her departure.

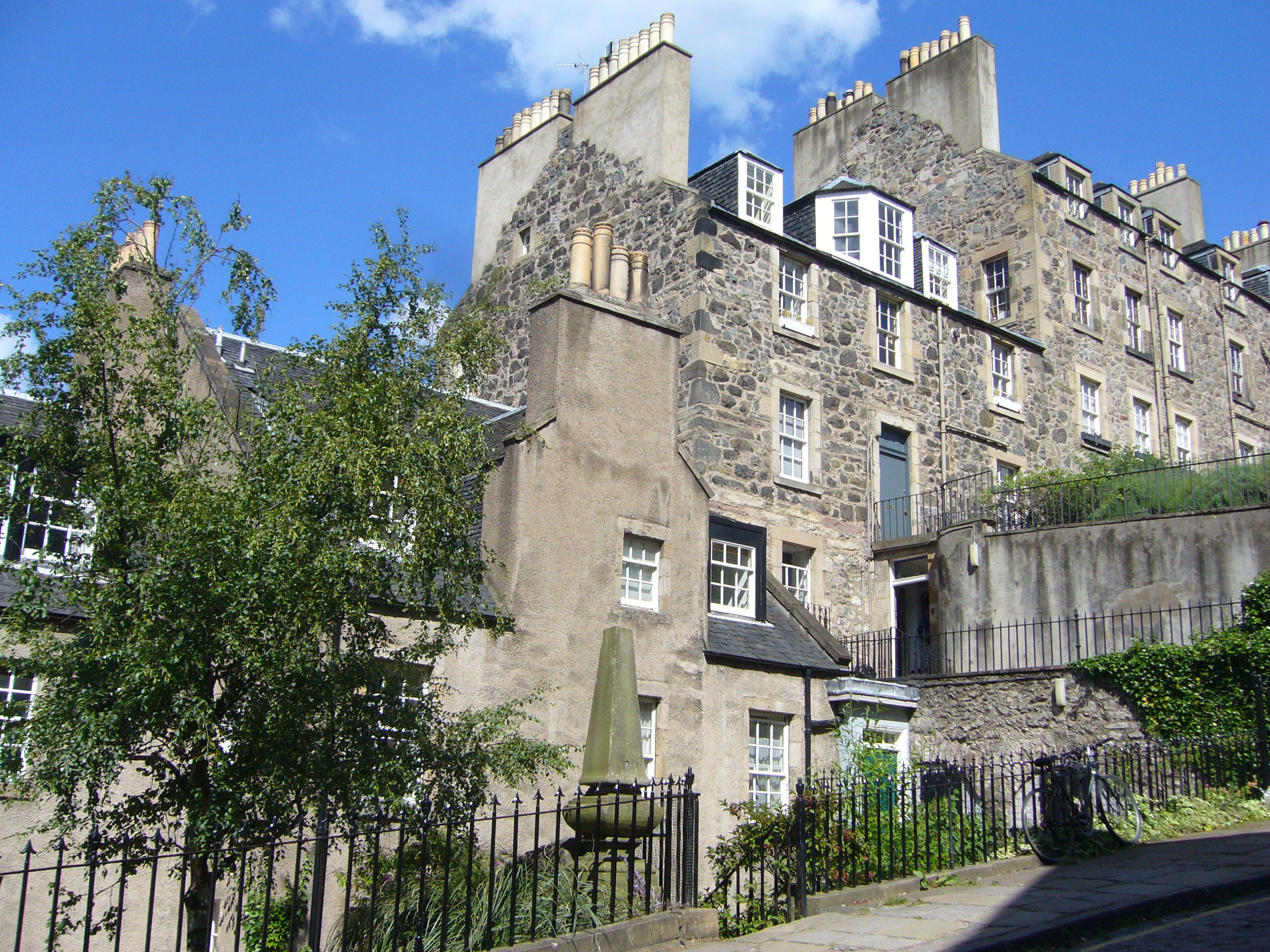
Georgian houses, Calton Hill, Edinburgh.

She was described as "short in stature, her form graceful, her hands and feet small and complexion fair, her cheeks ruddy, and a well-formed mouth displayed teeth beautifully white." Sir Walter Scott recorded having seen her at his friend Lord Craig's House, when she was "old, charmless and devout". Her friend Mrs Moodie reported that among Agnes's last words were, "I go to Jesus". The Clarinda-Sylvander letters in Mrs Moodie's possession were valued at twenty-five pounds.

In 1810 Agnes moved from Potterrow to live at 14 Calton Hill, Edinburgh where in 1825 Burns’s fourth son, Captain James Glencairn Burns, visited her. She died of old age on 23 October 1841 and was buried on 27th in the north-east corner of the tomb of her cousin William Craig, Lord Craig, in the East Ground of Canongate Kirkyard.

The plaque above her grave was not erected until 1909 and was sculpted by the Edinburgh sculptor Henry Snell Gamley.

=== Association with Robert Burns ===
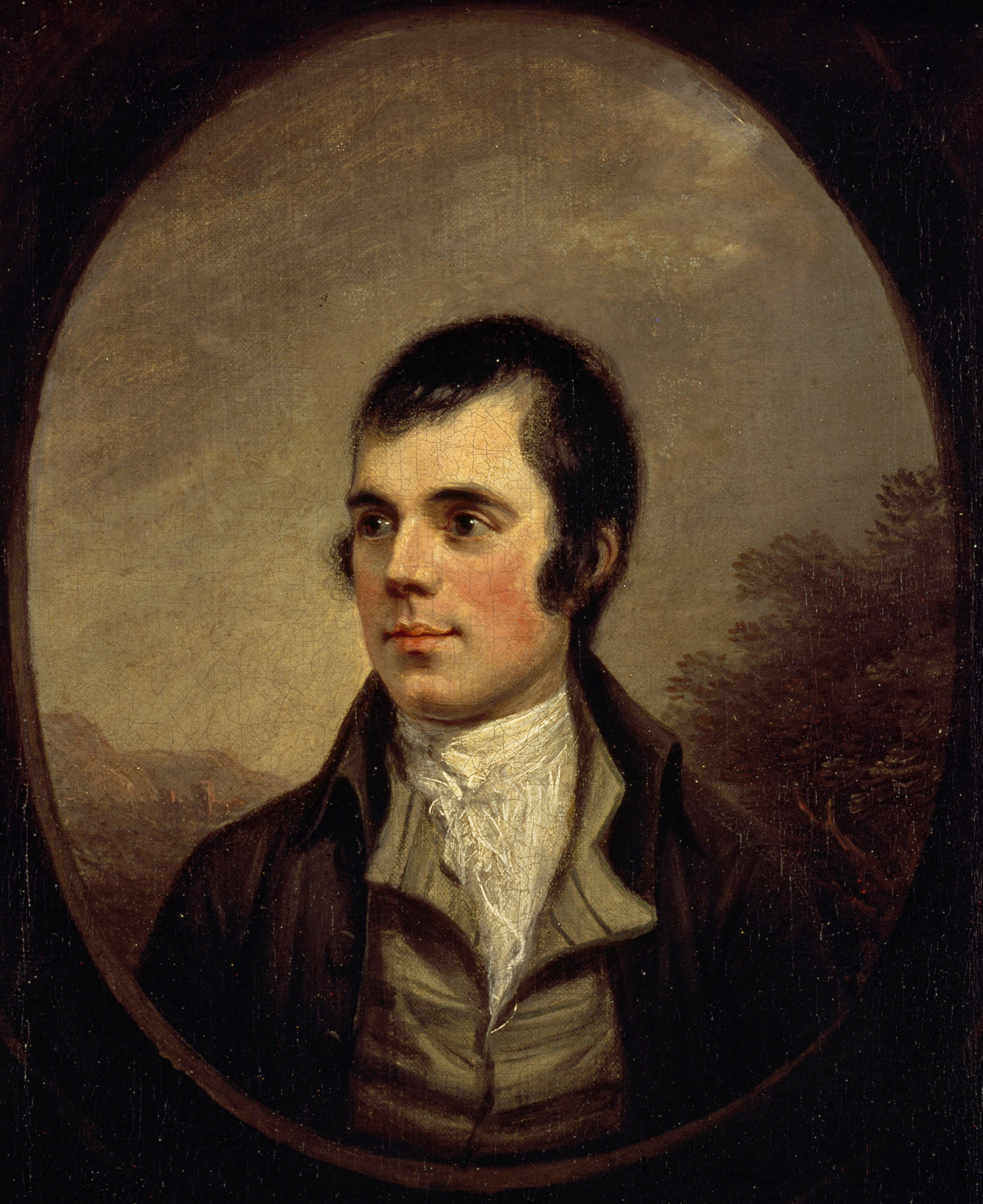
Full view of the Naysmith portrait of 1787, Scottish National Portrait Gallery

When Robert Burns came to Edinburgh, still unmarried, for the second time in 1787, Agnes was in her 29th year and separated from her husband for seven years. A competent poet, she was determined to meet him and finally did so on 4 December at a tea-party given by Miss Erskine Nimmo, a friend of Margaret Chalmers, at the house of Mr Nimmo, a revenue officer. Agnes was attracted to him and upon her return home she wrote Burns a note inviting him to drink tea with her the following Thursday at her house on General's Entry on the west side of Potterrow. He accepted the invitation. However, the actions of a coachman, probably drunk, caused the poet to fall from a coach and injure his knee, and his doctor insisted that he refrain from walking.

Sir Walter Scott referred to the resulting love letters that passed between Burns and Maclehose as "the most extraordinary mixture of sense and nonsense, and of love human and divine, that was ever exposed to the eye of the world."

On or around 8 December he wrote to her to explain his misfortune and pay her compliments, saying: "I can say with truth, Madam, that I never met with a person in my life whom I more anxiously wished to meet again than yourself... I know not how to account for it. I am strangely taken with some people; nor am I often mistaken, You are a stranger to me; but I am an odd being: some yet unnamed feelings; things, not principles, but better than whims, carry me farther than boasted reason ever did a Philosopher."

To this epistle Agnes quickly replied: "I perfectly comprehend... Perhaps instinct comes nearer their description than either "Principles" or "Whims". Think ye they have any connection with that 'heavenly light which leads astray'? One thing I know, that they have a powerful effect on me, and are delightful when under the check of reason and religion... Pardon any little freedoms I take with you."

This strange mixture of encouragement and restraint led to his response to some verses sent by Agnes: "Your lines, I maintain it, are poetry, and good poetry... Friendship... had I been so blest as to have met with you in time, might have led me — God of love only knows where." The use of the word "love" resulted in a reminder, namely "Do you remember that she whom you address is a married woman?"

At Christmas, they exchanged verse, Agnes's poem revealing her feelings about her unhappy marriage, whilst at the same time reminding Burns about the ultimate barriers which could not be crossed:

Talk not of Love, it gives me pain,
For Love has been my foe;
He bound me with an iron chain.
And plunged me deep in woe....

Your Friendship much can make me blest,
O, why that bliss destroy!
Why urge the odious, one request
You know I must deny!

Burns matched these verses to the tune "The Borders of Spey" for the Scots Musical Museum publication.

At this point Burns agreed to Agnes's suggestion of using the Arcadian names of "Sylvander" and "Clarinder". Another mention of love brought an objection and a reproof from Burns: "I do love you if possible still better for having so fine a taste and turn for Poesy. I have again gone wrong in my usual unguarded way, but you may erase the word and put esteem, respect, or any other tame Dutch expression you please in its place."

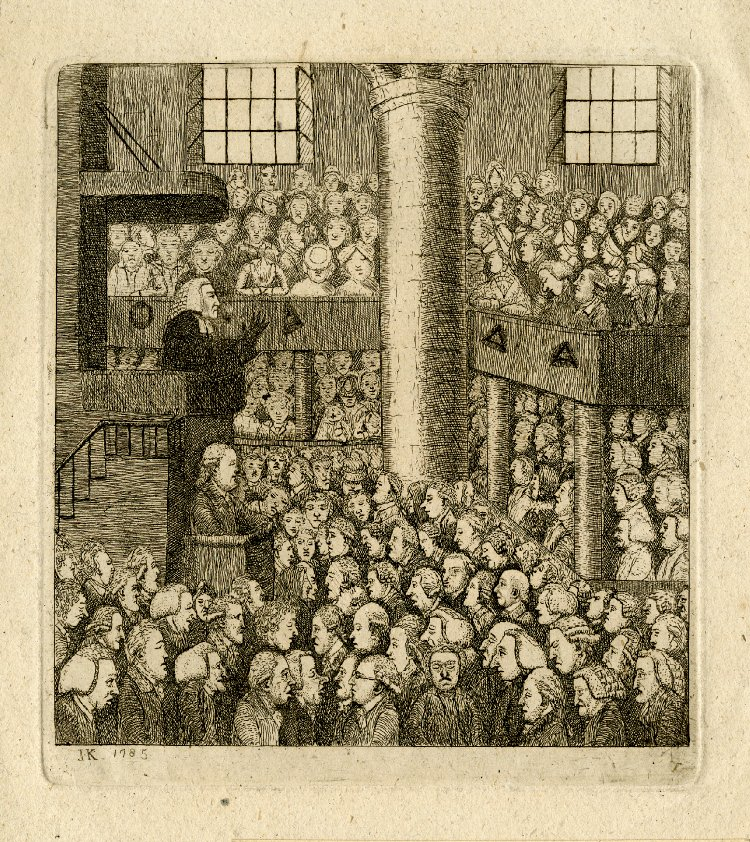
The congregation of the Tolbooth Kirk c.1750

Her guilty feelings however show in the lines: "I entreat you not to mention our corresponding to anyone on earth. Though I've conscious innocence, my situation is a delicate one." The Reverend John Kemp, of the sternly Calvinistic congregation of the Tolbooth Kirk, was her spiritual adviser and would certainly not have approved, nor would Lord Craig, whose generosity was essential to her.

On 30 December 1787, Burns wrote to a close confidant, Captain Richard Brown at Irvine: "Almighty Love still 'reigns and revels' in my bosom; and I am at this moment ready to hang myself for a young Edinr. Widow, who has wit and beauty more murderously fatal than the assassinating stiletto of the Sicilian banditti, or the poisoned arrow of the savage African." Burns was able to visit Nancy in a sedan chair on 5 January, the first of six visits that month. The love letters and visits continued, the most telling being after they had been together again on the evening of 23 January, Agnes wrote: "I am neither well nor happy. My heart reproaches me of last night. If you wish Clarinda to regain her peace, determine against everything but what the strictest delicacy warrants." On 26 January Burns writes that: "Perhaps the 'line' you had marked was a little infringed," and Agnes replied, "but, though I disapprove, I have not been unhappy about it."

Burns's failure to achieve a physical "conquest" may have directly resulted in his sudden affair with Agnes's personal maid, Jenny Clow, resulting in the birth of a son. A rapid exchange of letters in late February, was the result of either the Reverend Kemp or, more likely, Lord Craig, having sent a "haughty dictatorial letter" about the erosion of his niece's reputation.

On Saturday, 23 February, Robert Burns arrived at Willie's Mill in Tarbolton, to see Jean Armour who had left her parents house due to her pregnancy to stay with the Muir family. Burns wrote to Agnes from Mossgiel, saying:

Now for a little news that will please you. I, this morning as I came home, called for a certain woman. I am disgusted with her; I cannot endure her! I, while my heart smote me for the prophanity, tried to compare her with my Clarinda; 'twas setting the expiring glimmer of a farthing taper beside the cloudless glory of the meridian sun. Here was tasteless insipidity, vulgarity of soul, and mercenary fawning; there, polished good sense, heaven-born genius, and the most generous, the most delicate, the most tender Passion. I have done with her, and she with me....

Robert married Jean Armour within six weeks of this letter, something Agnes had urged him to do, a fact however which he left his friend Robert Ainslie to tell her. He had received his commission with the Excise and his marriage may well have been a condition of this appointment.

On 6 December 1791 Robert and Agnes met in Edinburgh for the last time; she outlived him by 45 years.

Under the date, 6 December 1831, Nancy wrote in her journal: "This day I can never forget. Parted with Burns, in the year 1791, never more to meet in this world. Oh, may we meet in Heaven!"

In her old age Agnes Maclehose took great delight in talking of the poems and songs Burns had written in her honour and also of her own verses he had received and approved. On the anniversary of any event concerning Burns, she noted in her journal, "Things I never can forget".

=== The letters ===
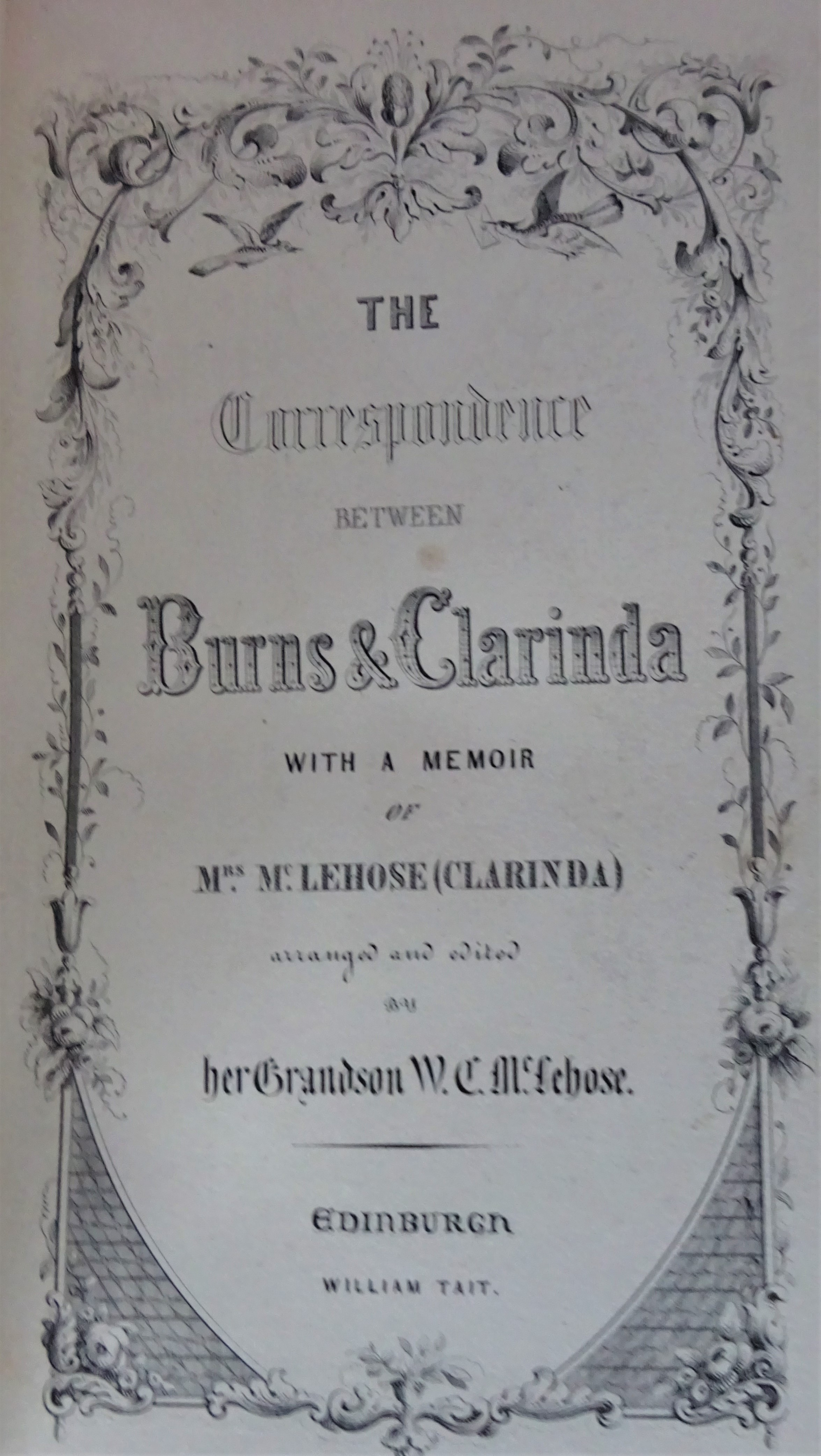
The Correspondence of Burns and Clarinda. 1843.

Agnes was careful to retain control of the letters after Burns's death. In negotiations with his biographers Alexander Cunningham and John Syme she offered to select passages from his letters to her in exchange for the return of her own; she eventually succeeded in recovering the manuscripts, and only a few passages from Burns's side of the correspondence were published during her lifetime.

It was her grandson, W. C. Maclehose, who published in 1843, for the first time legally, both sides of the correspondence, minus some of her letters, which she had apparently destroyed, and some passages from Burns's letters, which according to the preface had been destroyed by frequent handling as Agnes Maclehose showed them to visitors or cut pieces out for autograph hunters. This may partly explain the belief Agnes tampered with many of the dates and names on her letters for some obscure reason of her own. An earlier attempt to publish the Letters to Clarinda without permission had been blocked by a Court of Session interdict.

=== Songs ===
On 27 December, Burns sent a letter to Agnes from Dumfries containing "Ae Fond Kiss". The song celebrates Burns's passion for her, and first appeared in the Museum, 1792. The letter is held by National Library of Scotland as part of the Watson Autograph collection of manuscripts.

Ae fond kiss, and then we sever;
Ae fareweel, alas, for ever!
Deep in heart-wrung tears I'll pledge thee,
Warring sighs and groans I'll wage thee.
Who shall say that Fortune grieves him,
While the star of hope she leaves him?
Me, nae cheerful twinkle lights me;
Dark despair around benights me.

I'll ne'er blame my partial fancy,
Naething could resist my Nancy:
But to see her was to love her;
Love but her, and love for ever.
Had we never lov'd sae kindly,
Had we never lov'd sae blindly,
Never met-or never parted,
We had ne'er been broken-hearted.

Fare-thee-weel, thou first and fairest!
Fare-thee-weel, thou best and dearest!
Thine be ilka joy and treasure,
Peace, Enjoyment, Love and Pleasure!
Ae fond kiss, and then we sever!
Ae fareweel alas, for ever!
Deep in heart-wrung tears I'll pledge thee,
Warring sighs and groans I'll wage thee.

== Jean Armour ==
Jean Armour was well aware of her husband's fondness for Agnes and also knew that he corresponded regularly with her. In 1821 she accepted an invitation to stay with George Thomson in Edinburgh and one of the visitors with whom she had tea was Agnes Maclehose. They talked at length about each other's families and it was clear to her that Agnes had a great fondness for departed husband.

== Jenny Clow ==
Jenny Clow was a domestic servant to Agnes Maclehose. Her mistress sent her to deliver a letter to the poet and he seduced her. The twenty-year-old Jenny Clow gave birth in November 1788 to Robert Burns's child, Robert Burns Clow.

Whilst he was in Dumfries in November 1791, Robert Burns received a letter from Agnes Mclehose, informing him that Jenny Clow "to all appearances is at this moment dying. Obliged, from all the symptoms of a rapid decay, to quit her service, she is gone to a room almost without common necessaries, untended and unmourned. In circumstances so distressing, to whom can she so naturally look for aid as to the father of her child, the man for whose sake she has suffered many a sad and anxious night, shut from the world, with no other companions than guilt and solitude? You have now an opportunity to evince you indeed possess those fine feelings you have delineated, so as to claim the just admiration of your country. I am convinced I need add nothing farther to persuade you to act as every consideration of humanity must dictate." Burns asked Agnes to get a porter to take five shillings from him to Jenny Clow.

== May Cameron ==
In 1787, Robert Burns also had a brief consummated affair with May Cameron, a servant girl working in Edinburgh near to the house of William Creech, Burns's Edinburgh publisher. After a brief relationship with Burns she lost her job and had at first to rely upon the poet for funds. May married her cousin Mungo Forbes in September 1788.

== Micro-history ==
On 18 February 1788, Burns wrote to Agnes Maclehose having just met with his brother William Burns and Richard Brown, saying "I have just met with my old friend, the ship captain; guess my pleasure; to meet you could alone have given me more. --- My brother William too, the young Saddler, has come to Glasgow to meet me, and here we three spending the evening."

The John Miers silhouette of Agnes was made for Burns and was still in his possession at the time of his death.

Agnes made a garment for young Robert or "Little Bobbie" and Burns gave this to him upon his return from Edinburgh in 1788.

Lord Craig, her cousin, took care of Agnes from age 23 and even after his death via his will, providing for her over a total of 60 years.

Lord Craig left a considerable sum of money and his library, on his decease to Agnes's son, Andrew Maclehose. The library was sold shortly before the death of the beneficiare, who had become impoverished.

Her second cousin John McLaurin, Lord Dreghorn, treated her poorly. He was the son of the celebrated mathematician, Colin McLaurin.

A Scottish musical play entitled Tea with Clarinda, written by Mike Gibb and Kevin Walsh about Agnes or Nancy McLehose, mainly focusing on her unconsummated love affair with Robert Burns, while also highlighting the poet's relationship with Jenny Clow.

Scottish performer and writer Anna Hillis wrote a play about the meeting between Jean (Armour) Burns and Agnes Maclehose. Called Tea with Clarinda, the play toured Scotland as part of the Homecoming Scotland 2009 celebrations.

== Memorials ==
A plaque to Clarinda was erected by the City Architect, Ebenezer James MacRae in the 1930s, on the west gable of the Council block on Marshall Street, facing onto Potterow, commemorating the existence of her then demolished house to the south-west.

== See also ==
- Jean Armour
- Alison Begbie
- Elizabeth 'Betty' Burns
- Jenny Clow
- Jean Gardner
- Nelly Kilpatrick
- Jessie Lewars
- Ann Park
- Peggy Thompson
