= Lochlea, South Ayrshire =

Coordinates: 55°32′31.2″N 4°26′50.6″W

Lochlea, also Lochlie
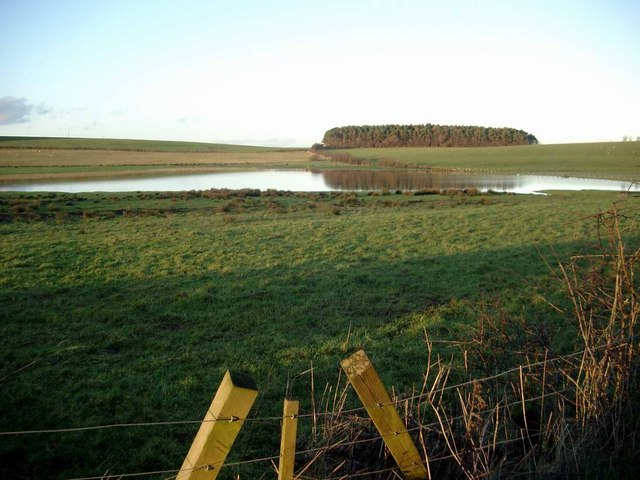
- Lochlea

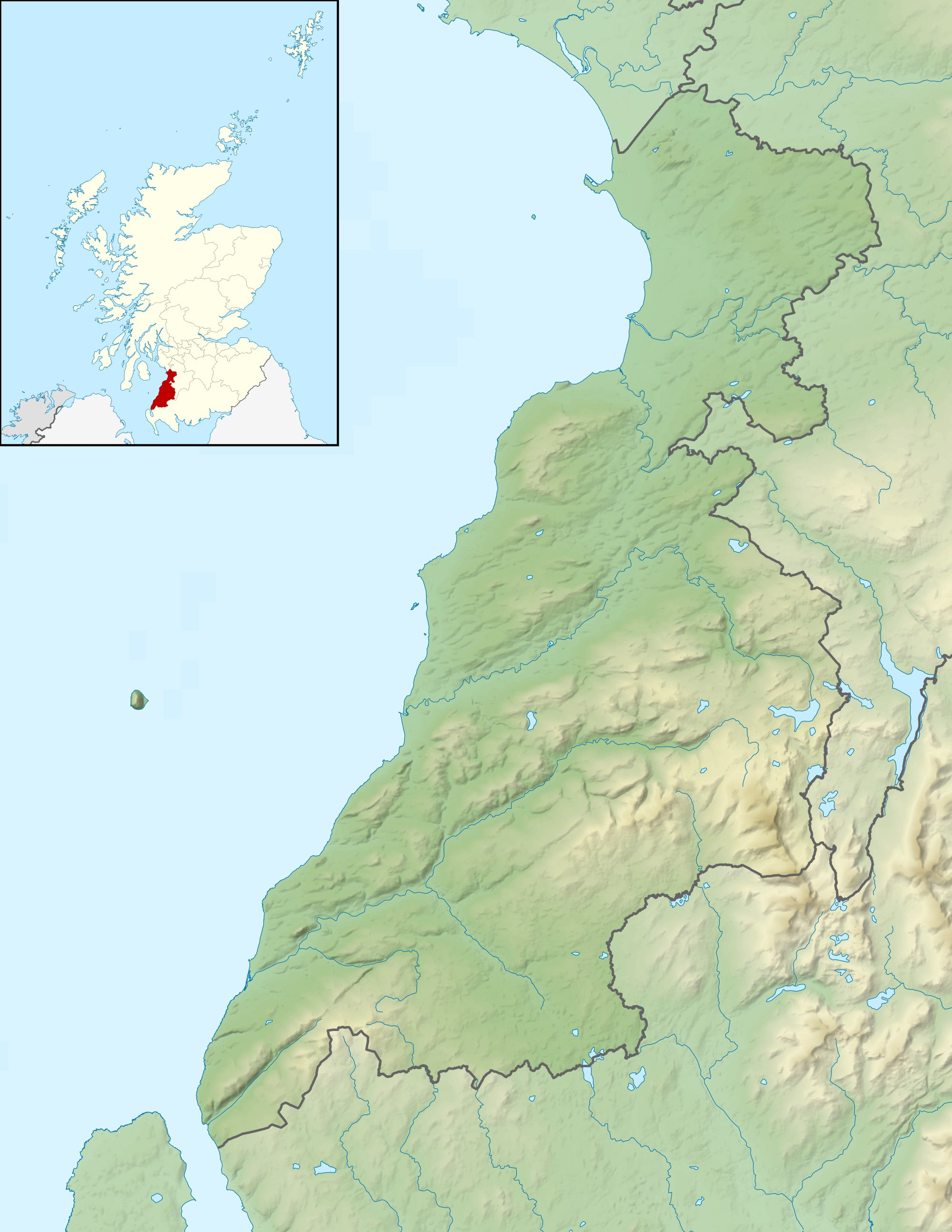
- Location within South Ayrshire
- Location: Tarbolton, South Ayrshire, Scotland
- Type: Drained freshwater loch
- Primary inflows: Rainfall and runoff
- Primary outflows: Mill Burn
- Basin countries: Scotland
- Max. length: 950 m (3,120 ft)
- Max. width: 1,450 ft (440 m)
- Surface area: 19.675 acres (8 ha)
- Surface elevation: 400 ft (120 m)
- Islands: One
- Settlements: Tarbolton

Lochlea or Lochlie (pronounced 'Lochli') was situated in a low-lying area between the farms and dwellings of Lochlea and Lochside in the Parish of Tarbolton, South Ayrshire, Scotland. The loch was natural, sitting in a hollow created by glaciation. The loch waters ultimately drained via Fail Loch, the Mill Burn, and the Water of Fail. It is well-documented due to the presence of a crannog that was excavated and documented circa 1878, and its association with the poet Robert Burns, who lived here for several years whilst his father was the tenant. Lochlea lies 2 1/2 miles (4 kilometres) northeast of Tarbolton, and just over three miles (five kilometres) northwest of Mauchline.

== History ==
The loch also recorded as 'Lochly', 'Lochlee' and 'Lochlie' may derive its name from 'Liath', Gaelic for the 'Grey Loch'. It was once much more extensive, and changes in the water level are indicated by the successive alterations identified within the site's crannog.

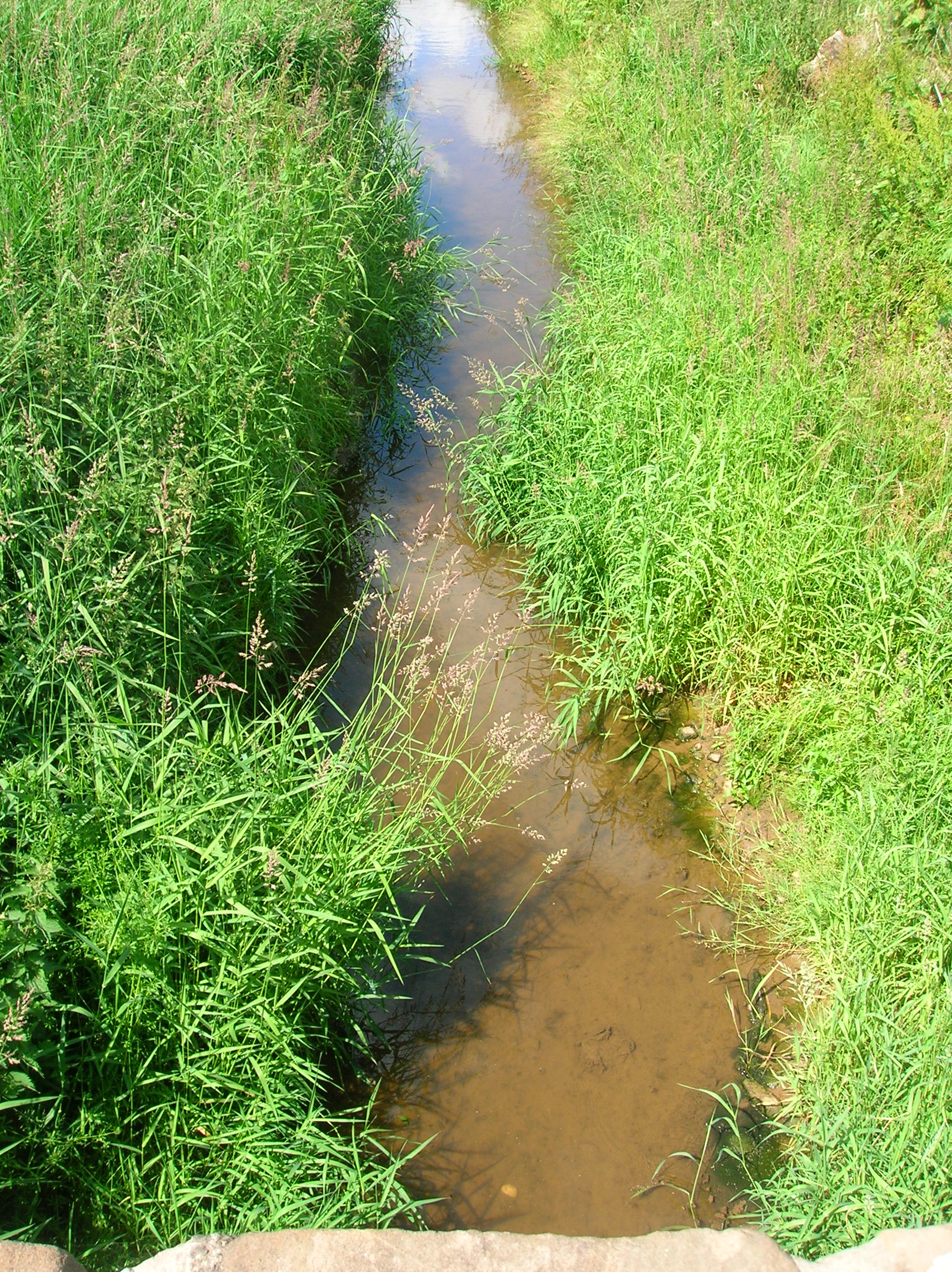
The Water of Fail near Fail Castle Cottage

The Duke of Portland abolished thirlage on his estates in the mid-19th century, making Millburn Mill, and its head of water, Lochlea, redundant, resulting in active attempts at drainage causing its demise circa 1840. The lands became part of the fields of Lochlea Farm. Adamson records that the loch was drained in 1839, during which two canoes were found near the crannog. The waters still contributed to the flow to Fail Mill that stood on the rivulet of the Water of Fail. This mill survived into the 20th century. Much of the surrounding lands in the area and those of Lochlea originally belonged to the monks of Fail Monastery. The natural drainage, the Mill Burn, was from the south-east corner, running into a narrow valley that ran eventually into Fail Loch.

William Muir was the tenant of the Mill of Fail at the time of Robert Burns.

Blaeu's map of 1654 clearly shows the loch and indicates that it was somewhat smaller, less than half the size, of Fail Loch. Roy's map of 1747 shows the loch and indicates a 'Lochleehill'. Thomson records a 'Lochbar'.

In 1842 drainage was underway and it was being converted into arable land and the associated mill was abandoned.

The early Ordnance Survey maps show the site as fully drained, however drainage is now inadequate and the area is becoming re-established as a seasonal loch.

Shaw relates in the 1950s that "Lochlee, Fail Loch and Tarbolton Loch are no longer so full of water as when they were required to supply water for the meal mills, and gave good skating and curling in a hard winter. They are now to a large extent drained away, but are still the haunt of snipe, goose, duck, and swan."

=== Drainage ===
Although the loch's drainage may have begun in the 18th century when Alexander Montgomerie, 10th Earl of Eglinton, was pursuing a number of agricultural improvements on his extensive estates and other landowners followed his example, drainage work may have taken place in the 1740s as part of the improvements undertaken to provide employment for Irish estate workers during the Irish potato famines of the 1740s and the mid 19th centuries. Many drainage schemes also date to the end of World War I when many soldiers returned en masse to civilian life.

The loch may have survived during the Burns family's time as Robert and Gilbert grew flax and probably used the loch as a retting pond for the preparation of the flax.

=== The crannog ===
This artificial island was mainly visible in the summer months and lay about 75 yards from the southern bank of the loch. Despite its prominence during Robert Burns's time, he made no recorded reference to it. A wooden walkway ran to it from the south-east side of the loch. At least five dugout canoes were found, some distance from the crannog. The land had become marshy again by 1878 and the re-discovery at this time generated enough interest to spark an excavation; the site and Lochlea Farm were owned by the Duke of Portland and Mr Turner, his factor, helped to organise the excavations, together with Mr. Cochrane-Patrick of Woodside, Beith. Much of the wood associated with the crannog was that of oak, hazel and birch, together with alder and poplar. Animals present included sheep, roe deer, red deer, reindeer, pig, and horse.

The crannog had several separate periods of occupation. Among the finds was a 9th-century ringed pin, and also several finds of 16th- or 17th-century origin, such as a brass mounted knife and a number of iron implements. It measured overall circa 33 m east–west by 23 m transversely, with its centre at NS 4574 3027.

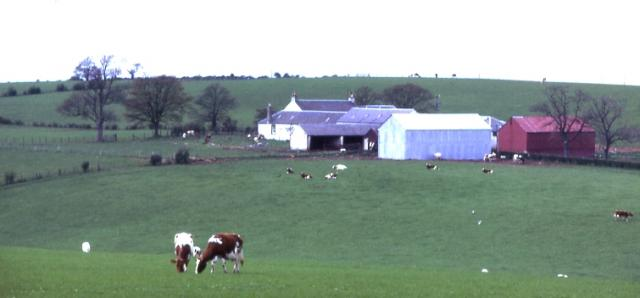
Lochlea Farm

Previous location of Lochlea, South Ayrshire

=== The Burns family connection ===
Lochlie or Lochlea, Robert Burns used both versions, became his home in 1777 when his father William Burnes moved here from Mount Oliphant. The 130-acre farm and loch were owned by David McLure, an Ayr merchant. Burns moved to Mossgiel Farm near Mauchline in 1784, having spent some nine unhappy months away in Irvine learning flax processing. The farmland was very mossy and William Burnes had problems paying his rather high rent resulting in a successful court case against the landlord that used up his savings and contributed to his premature death in February 1784. Burns is said to have roofed the barn himself and upon its demolition an engraved lintel from it was incorporated into the new farmhouse that replaced it. In 1879 the poet's home had become a barn.

William Burnes had a verbal agreement in the early 1780s to pay rent on the mill dam, referring to the land covered by the loch. David McClure had not yet drained this land and therefore William disputed the payment.

In Burns's day Lochlea was one of three plains that were deliberately flooded in winter to provide water to power the mill that only worked in winter once the harvest was in. Lochlea Loch had an acreage of twenty and its small island was a breeding site for watefowl.

William Ronald was a gauds boy to Burns at Lochlea Farm, assisting him with the ploughing by encouraging and guiding the horses whilst carrying a plough staff to clean the ploughshare when it clogged with earth. He later became a farmer at Mauleside, a small estate near Beith on the road from Dalry.

Isabella Burns recounted from memory the nursery story The Marriage of Robin Redbreast and the Wren that Robert Burns had written and used at Lochlea Farm to entertain his young siblings Annabella, William and John.

The Burns family left Lochlea in 1784 and moved to Mossgiel Farm near Mauchline.

=== Highland Mary ===
Burns met Mary Campbell aka 'Highland Mary' in church while he was living near Tarbolton. His song "Will ye go to the Indies, my Mary, And leave auld Scotia's shore?" suggests that they planned to emigrate to Jamaica together, however after a brief illness she died at Greenock. Burns and Mary Campbell apparently exchanged Bibles over a water course in the area around Coilsfield or Failford and possibly some sort of traditional Scottish matrimonial vows on the banks of the River Ayr, either at the Failford, where the Mauchline Burn has its confluence with the River Ayr, or near Coilsfield.

=== Lochlea Whisky ===
The farm released its first own whisky. It is called "Lochlea First Release" and was matured in First Fill Bourbon and Pexdro Ximenez (PX) Casks. At first it was released in scotland and then sold worldwide. In March 2022, the distillery announced the release of a four bottle strong limited edition series. The first bottling of the series, the "Lochlea Sowing Edition (First Crop)" is announced for March 21, 2022. Lochlea announced the end of the four quarterly "Seasonal Releases" in April 2024. The distillery has also announced the release of its core release "Lochlea Our Barley" for summer 2022. At the beginning of 2023, the distillery released its first peaty whisky, the "Lochlea Ploughing Edition First Crop". The first cask strength Lochlea Whisky will be released on 31 March 2023.

== Micro-history ==
James Thom was born near Lochlea and went on to become a famous sculptor of Robert Burns and his contemporaries.

Lochlea 1 & 2 collieries were situated in the vicinity of the farm and operated from 1949 to 1973. Little visible remains survive.

Lochlea is the site of a wildfowl Wetland Bird Survey (WEBS) count.
