= Poems and Songs by Alexander Tait =

Poems and Songs
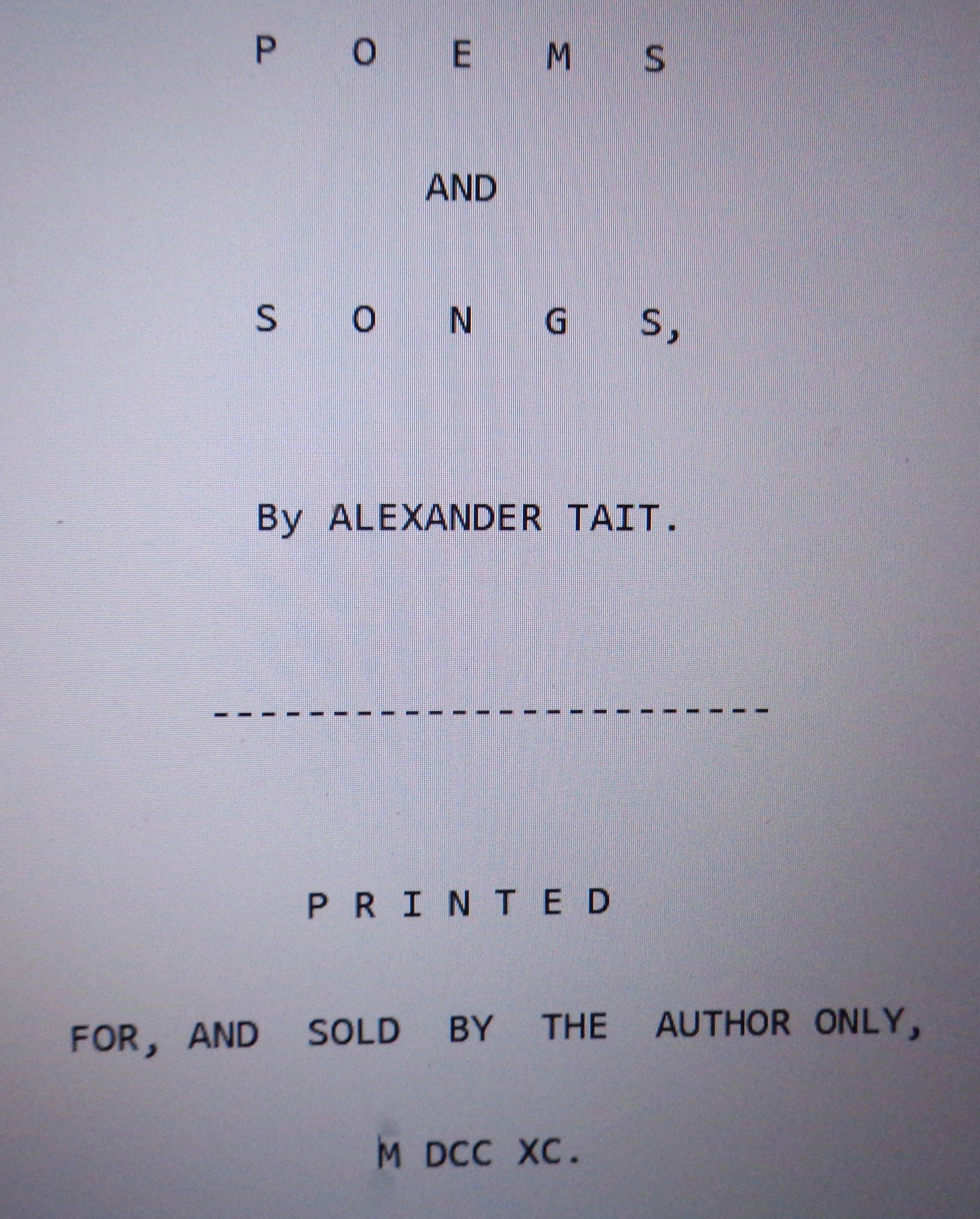
- Author: Alexander Tait (poet)
- Language: Scots
- Genre: Poetry and Lyrics
- Publisher: Unknown
- Publication date: 1790
- Publication place: Great Britain

Poems and Songs is a collection of 106 poems and songs by the Tarbolton based tailor, Alexander Tait (poet), a contemporary and associate of the poets Robert Burns and David Sillar. His poems were exhibited in the 1896 Burns Exhibition, a leather bound and decorated copy of his book being loaned by the Mitchell Library that remains in their special collections.

== The publication and its contents ==
=== Printing ===
The 'Title page' and text lack the attractive and impressive fleuron decorated layout as seen in such contemporary publications as Kilmarnock Edition by Robert Burns. A list of subscribers was not included in the volume and no copies, if one was ever printed, of a 'Proposals' advertisement or prospectus are known to have survived. No dedication or portrait of the author was included.

The volume was privately printed for the author and sold personally by Tait as stated at the bottom of the book's title page. The selling price was 1s 6d. He probably used the Paisley printer John Neilson. No details of the number of copies originally printed have survived or the number sold by the author.

=== Format ===
The format was octavo on hand made laid paper, in stabbed half-sheets with no discernable watermarks and it measures 16 x 9.7 cm on the trimmed gatherings. The signatures run from A-Pp4. The divisions are: (i) Title-page; (ii) List of Errata; (iii - vi) Table of Contents; (7 - 304) Text.

The work is 304 pages long with 106 poems and songs, 10 of which are specifically named as songs. The title page suggests that Tait was not assisted by anyone in the sale of his 'Poems and Songs.' It does not claim in the text to be "Entered in Stationers Hall" of the Worshipful Company of Stationers and Newspaper Makers. No glossary was included despite the use of many Scots words, an indication of his intended audience. Only one edition of the Poems is known to have been printed.

It is not known how many copies survive outside of Glasgow's Mitchell Library and the Paisley Museum and Central Library. The historical value of the 'Poems' is enhanced by its link with Robert Burns and David Sillar. The incorporation of a version of the "Kirks Alarm' by Robert Burns is another significant feature.

=== Local Influence ===
An example of a copy of The Ayrshire Garland.

Tait published an early version of the "Kirk's Alarm" by Robert Burns, probably from the "Ayrshire Garland" of 1789 with one stanzas removed and two stanzas of his added, namely "Cessnock Side.." and "Davie Douf....". Robert Burns, David Sillar, Claud Alexander of Ballochmyle, his wife Helenora and several other local people feature in his poems.

== Critical reception ==
His poetry has had few admirers apart perhaps from Mrs Helenora Alexander of Ballochmyle and Mackay describes his efforts as "Ungrammatical, defective in metre and deficient in rhyme." Paterson states that ".. that his pieces would, in short, be intolerable but for their absurdity..." Local events and personalities however were the subject of his poems and songs, giving them a local historical significance.

=== Printing Errors ===
The word 'Whisky' in the 'Contents' list number 97 has the spelling 'Whitky.' In "The Kirk's alarm, composed by Plotcock the foul thief's excisemen," the last word was probably intended to be 'Exciseman.' The list of errors on page 7 records four pages with errors, however the error correction for 'Page 286, Line 14. for 'fresh and clean', read, 'fresh and green.' is itself an error as this correction actually relates to Page 186. Page numbering errors are that Pages 1–3, 7 and 11 have no number printed, Page 9 is bracketed (9) in isolation until Page 19 is reached. Pages (19) to (26) are in brackets whilst the remainder of the volume's pages are not bracketed. The Page number 32 is used on two pages, however the page sequence is correct from Page 34. Numerous minor errors are present, such as the 'The Toleration' on the relevant page and 'Toleration' on the 'Contents' page, also 'A New Song on Whisky' on the 'Contents' and 'Whisky Song' on page 281. .

'The Serpent's Delight' is on page 9, but not on the list.'Youth's Prosperity and Old Age Misery' is on pages 235-241, but it is not listed at all on the 'Contents' page. 'Entrikine Ailey' is listed on page 235, but is missing altogether as is 'Catrine Valley from page 242.' 'Paisley New Year' is on pages 242-247, not page 248. Page 248 has 'London's Admirartion', not page 249. 'India's Consternation' is on page 249, not page 256. 'Lord Abercorn's Burial' is on page 250, not page 251. 'His Lordship's Last Journey' is on page 251, not page 252. 'Ramble Through Paisley' is on page 252. 'Paisley Maids' is on page 257, not page 259. 'Paisley Lads' is on page 259, not page 263. Page 263 has 'Epistle to Willie,' so two poems are not actually on page 263.

== The Contents List of Poems and songs by Alexander Tait (1790) ==
- "Song on Masonrie"
- "The Good Man's Joy"
- "The Pope's Joy"
- "Jove's Son's Adze"
- "Pride's Disgrace"
- "The holy father's dressing room"
- "Satan's coachman driving to the masquerade"
- "Calvin's sons speech"
- "Satan's cook"
- "The triumphs of the faithful, see page 19th, etc"
- "The answer"
- "The holy father's new-light lantern"
- "A song, see the Pope's letter"
- "P ------s against E ------s new-light now practised at Rome"
- "French Patrons cloding chaplains into the kirk"
- "The holy see"
- "The rusty church canons"
- "Anthem"
- "A journey to destruction"
- "The key of tophet"
- "Newton edifice"
- "The orthodox's lamentation"
- "The devil in disguise"
- "The pope's gray gown"
- "The holy father's letter"
- "The priest's lance for persecution"
- "Abraham offering up his son Isaac"
- "The Jew's Scape goat"
- "An ode"
- "A father's voyage from Japan to Rome"
- "The death of the heathen gods"
- "Our savious crucifixion"
- "Thoughts on death"
- "The atheist of Lancashire"
- "The wicked doctor of B-th's repentance"
- "The holy father's letter to A-r"
- "Toleration"
- "The dregs of the Whisky pat"
- "A fox chace"
- "Tarbolton"
- "On the cultivation of potatoes"
- "On the cooking of potatoes"
- "The Lady Ballochmile's chariot"
- "A song in praise of potatoes"
- "A new song"
- "The illumination of Tarbolton on the recovery of his Majesty"
- "The turtle feast"
- "Lintseed a poem"
- "Ballochmile's cotton-mill, a poem"
- "Colsfield's hawks and grey-hounds"
- "On Entrikine, a poem"
- "Sillar's and Tait, or tit for tat"
- "B-rns in his infancy"
- "B-rns in Lochly"
- "B-rns's hen clocking in Mauchline"
- "King Donald's elegy"
- "The pope's lantern departed from Scotland"
- "A new song"
- "The Clan's burial place"
- "Adam and Eve in their original"
- "Argyle's beef barrel"
- "Argyle's Mustard box"
- "The Kirk's alarm, composed by Plotcock the foul thief's excisemen"
- "Answer to Plotcock"
- "The famous Hannibal"
- "The honest farmer who is no friend to deceit"
- "A song"
- "The diamond of Scotland"
- "A song"
- "The ace of hearts"
- "The amazing factor"
- "Battle of the Largs"
- "Battle of Loncartie"
- "Battle of Dunkell"
- "Battle of Aberlemny"
- "Battle of Roslin"
- "Wallace and the English"
- "Noble Bruce"
- "Bruce"
- "The admirable navigation"
- "Entrikine ailey"
- "Catrine Valley"
- "Paisley New-year"
- "London's admiration"
- "India's consternation"
- "Lord Abercorn's burial"
- "His Lorship's last journey"
- "Ramble through Paisley"
- "Paisley maids"
- "Paisley lads"
- "Epistle to Willie"
- "The author's nativity"
- "Jockey and Jenny"
- "Tarry woo"
- "The farmer's joy"
- "A new hunting song"
- "A new song on whitky"
- "A hunting song"
- "The sailor's vision"
- "The author's inventory"
- "Epistle to the friendly club"
- "The apparition"
- "A compliment"
- "A rarity"

Tait gave 'Sillar's' name in full however he used the term 'Plotcock,' a soubriquet for the 'Devil' or missed out the second letter of Burns's name as a very thin disguise of the poet's identity. The piece "P ------s against E ------s new-light now practised at Rome" has two blank sections of text. 'The triumphs of the faithful, see page 19th, etc' is an open letter rather than a poem or a song. 'Entrikine ailey' and 'Catrine Valley' as listed are absent, whilst 'Youth's Prosperity and Old Age Misery' is present, but not listed. 'The Serpent's Delight' is on page nine, but not listed.

== See also ==
- Alexander Tait (poet)
- Poems, Chiefly in the Scottish Dialect
- Poems, Chiefly in the Scottish Dialect (Edinburgh Edition)
- Robert Burns World Federation
- Burns Clubs
