= Greenock (disambiguation) =

Greenock is a town in Inverclyde, Scotland, United Kingdom.

Greenock can also refer to:

== In Scotland ==
- Greenock Academy, a former school in Greenock
- Greenock Blitz, the attack on the town of Greenock, Scotland by the Luftwaffe in May 1941
- Greenock Dockyard Company, a shipbuilding firm
- Easter Greenock Castle, a demolished castle
- Greenock Morton FC, a Scottish football team
- Greenock Telegraph, a local newspaper serving Inverclyde
- Greenock (UK Parliament constituency), a former constituency of the British House of Commons
- Greenock and Port Glasgow (UK Parliament constituency), a former constituency of the British House of Commons
- Greenock and Inverclyde (Scottish Parliament constituency), a constituency of the Scottish Parliament
- Greenock (HM Prison), a facility in the Scottish Prisons Service
- Greenock Water, a river in East Ayrshire

== Other places ==
Australia

- Greenock, South Australia, a town in the Barossa Valley

Canada

- Greenock Township, Ontario, a historic township in Brockton, Ontario

United States

- Greenock, Pennsylvania, a census designated place in Allegheny County, Pennsylvania

== Other uses ==
- Lord Greenock, a courtesy title held by Earl Cathcart
- Greenockite, a cadmium mineral
