= Water of Fail =

River in South Ayrshire, Scotland

Coordinates: 55°30′15″N 4°26′28″W

The Water of Fail, or River Fail, is a fast-flowing river in South Ayrshire, Scotland. It rises in the hills north of Tarbolton, flowing generally south through Tarbolton Loch into Montgomery Woods where it joins the larger River Ayr at Failford, which carries its water down into the sea. The River Fail is a popular fishing spot and has been known to have some large fish. It is just over 15 miles (24 km) long.
