= Alexander Tait (poet) =

Scottish tailor, poet, and associate of Robert Burns

- Born: 14 August 1720; Innerleithen, Peeblesshire
- Died: Circa 1800; Tarbolton
- Occupations: Tailor, poet

Alexander Tait, Sawney Tait or Saunders Tait (14 August 1720 - circa 1800) was a tailor, a published poet and also an associate of Robert Burns, whom he knew well. Tait was also well acquainted with the published poet and close friend of Burns, David Sillar. Tait spent much of his life in Tarbolton where he was an active member of the community. His poems were exhibited in the 1896 Burns Exhibition, a copy being loaned by the Mitchell Library. He was generally known locally as 'Whip-the-cat', an old expression that referred to itinerant tailors, etc. who went from door to door to do work for others.

== Life and background ==
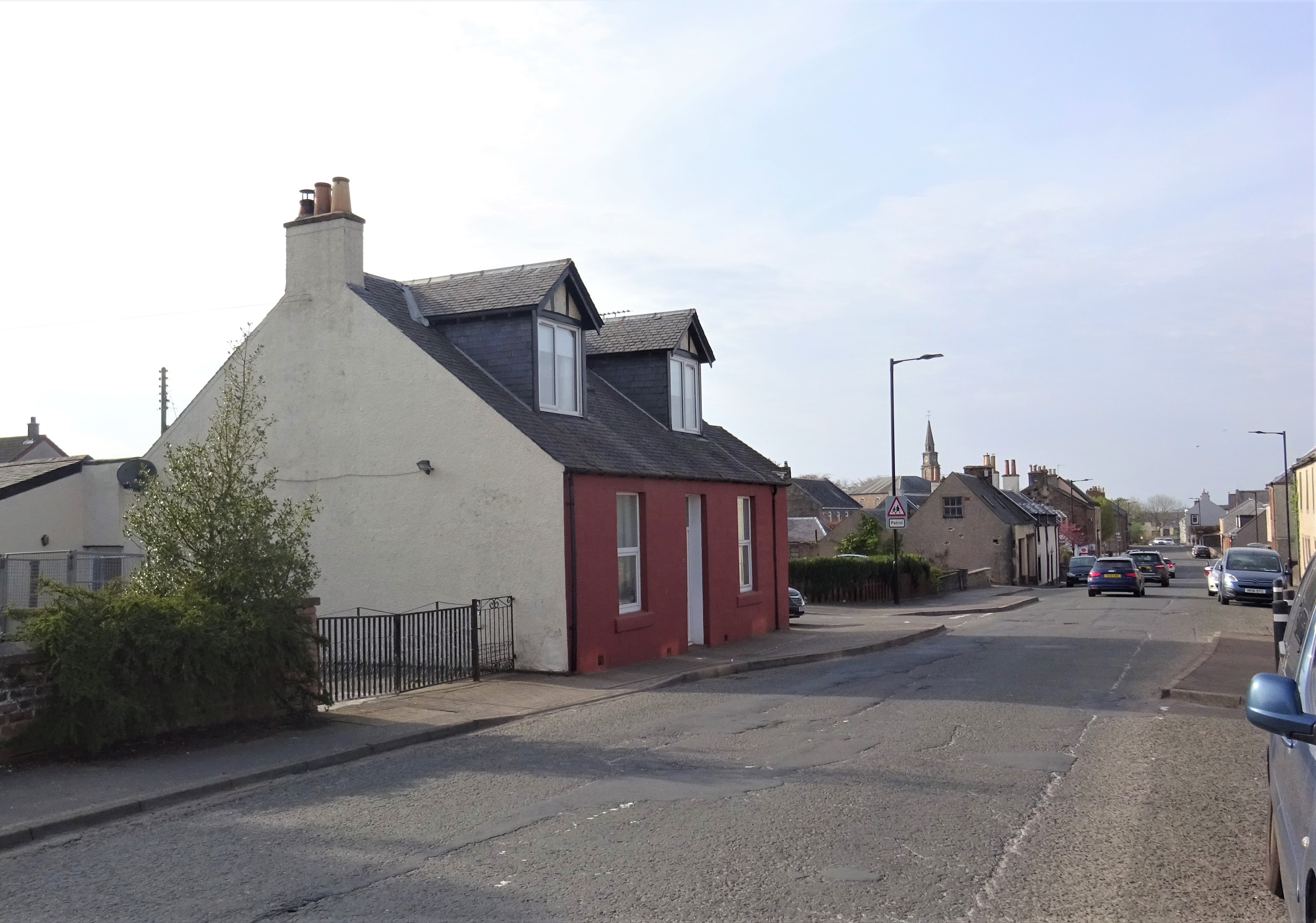
Montgomerie Street, Tarbolton

A lifelong bachelor, Tait is said to have lived in a small two-storied cottage on the west side of Montgomerie Street near the entrance to the school, occupying the garret of the building with only a large tame rat for company. His friend came to an untimely end when a female visitor encountered his pet and a male friend killed the unsuspecting rodent.

He is thought to have been born at Innerleithen, Peeblesshire, the home territory of the Clan Tait, where he seems to have had a limited education. He travelled a great deal in the South of Scotland in his early years as a pedlar, then he worked at mantua-making, selling gown-pieces to ladies and then making up the dress in the customer's home. Eventually he settled down in Tarbolton and established himself as a respected figure. He was a smart and active with a ready wit, given to lampooning, possessed of a store of amusing stories, was an accomplished rhymester and as such, was much in demand at weddings, bonspiels and other social occasions where his recitations were said to be "unco weel put thegither." He is described as "stout, well formed man of middle stature."

As a tailor he did not claim any particular skill and despite once making a coat in only one day he usually dismissed the vagaries of fashion and worked for 6d a day when the going rate was 8d.

For a time he worked in Paisley as a journeyman for Daniel Mitchell in John Street and during this phase he entertained his colleagues with his rhyming skills, "the smoothest doggrel". It is likely that during his time in Paisley his publication was being prepared for printing.

At the annual June Fair Tait set up an unofficial pub in his house that was well frequented by all, especially younger countryfolk who were attracted by his eccentric behaviour.

Tait was very fond of "pennystone", a game similar to quoits, and was successful at a challenge from a flesher from Ayr.

=== Poetry ===
Tait published his "Poems and Songs" in 1790, issued stabbed, probably using the Paisley printer John Neilson. Selling for 1s. 6d. the book was octavo, in half-sheets; 16 x 9.7 cm., trimmed and bound, 304 pages long, copies being privately printed for, and sold by the author only. MDCCXC. The signatures ran from A-Pp4 and the contents were : (i) Title-page; (ii) List of Errata; (iii - vi) Table of Contents; (7 - 304) Text. He published a version of the "Kirk's Alarm" by Robert Burns and added the stanzas "Cessnock Side.." and "Davie Douf...."

His poem and song titles include a version of Burns's "The Kirk's Alarm" under the title "Composed by Plotcock, the Foul Thief's Exciseman." with some original content: "Sillar and Tait; or, Tit for Tat"; "The Author's Nativity"; "The Lady Ballochmyle's Chariot"; "Colsfield's Hawks and Greyhounds"; "Illumination of Tarbolton on the Recovery of his Majesty"; "Battle of the Largs"; and "The Burial of Lord Abercorn". He also composed verses on Loncartie, Dunkeld, Aberlemny, Roslin and other places.

Robert Burns, David Sillar, Claud Alexander of Ballochmyle, his wife Helenora and several others feature in his poems. His poetry has few admirers and Mackay describes his efforts as "Ungrammatical, defective in metre and deficient in rhyme." Paterson states that ".. that his pieces would, in short, be intolerable but for their absurdity..." Local events and personalities were the subject of his poems, giving them a local significance.

== A partial list of the poems and songs in Tait's 1790 publication Poems and Songs ==
- "Composed by Plotcock, the Foul Thief's Excisemen"
- "The Answer to Plotcock"
- "Sillar and Tait; or, Tit for Tat"
- "The Author's Nativity"
- "The Lady Ballochmyle's Chariot"
- "Colsfield's Hawks and Greyhounds"
- "Illumination of Tarbolton on the Recovery of his Majesty"
- "Battle of the Largs"
- "The Burial of Lord Abercorn"
- "B-rns in Lochly"
- "B-rns in his Infancy"
- "B-rns's Hen Clockin in Mauchline"
- "A Compliment"
- "A Journey to Destruction"

=== Social standing ===
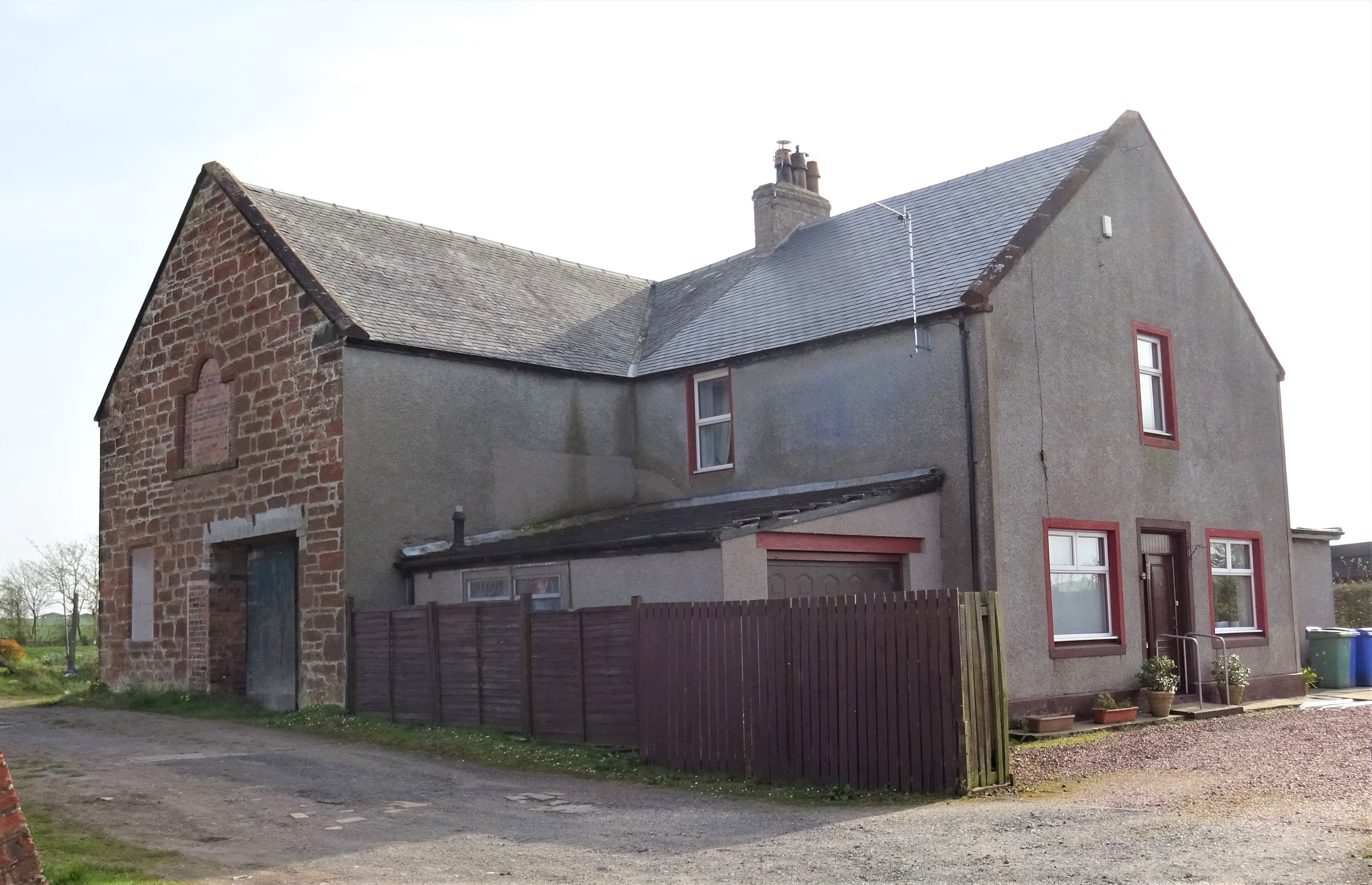
The old Secession Church

Tait owned several properties in the village at one point, selling them for reasons unknown, and held several posts within the village, recording them in the following verses:

I'm Patron to the Burgher folks,
I'm Cornal to the Farmer's Box
And Baillie to guid hearty cocks,
That are a'grand;
Has heaps o'houses built on rocks,
Wi' lime and sand.

In 1777 he was a prominent figure in the setting up of the Secession or Burgher Church despite objections from the heritors and the parish minister and Tait was central to the supply of dressed stone after shortages had threatened the project.

As related in the first line above he had the ceremonial rank of 'Colonel' in the Universal Friendly Society of Tarbolton, leading the Society's procession through the village that aimed to raise funds to reduce distress and poverty amongst agricultural workers. Tait had earned this rank in competition with William Sillar, David's brother, enrolling many more new members than William.

=== West Lowland Fencible Regiment ===
Aged seventy-five, Tait was one of the first to join this regiment, newly raised by Major Hugh Montgomerie of Coilsfield. In 1794 Tait is mentioned in Kay's Edinburgh Portraits relating that he was eccentric, small in stature, a poet, and showed great loyalty. After the regiment was disbanded Tait returned accompanied by a goat he had somehow acquired and a band of local children who had gone out to lead him home. Shortly after, being ill and feeling that his end was nigh he was taken in by William Wallace of Millburn near Tarbolton and died shortly after.

== Association with Robert Burns ==
At the time Robert lived at Lochlie Farm and David Sillar at Spittalside Farm, both close to Tarbolton, so they would have known Alexander Tait well. Tait is said to have once been on good terms with Robert Burns as in his Poem and Songs he published, as stated, a version of "The Kirk's Alarm" with two additional stanzas. However, he included the work as an occasional piece solely to set up his own poem, "The Answer to Plotcock", vigorously satirising Burns's work in inferior verse, but failing to mention his name. Burns's version of "The Kirk's Alarm" did not appear in print until 1801." Plotcock is a sobriquet for the Devil.

It seems that at some stage Burns and his friend David Sillar insulted Tait's poetry and he decided to amply repay the sentiments in verse, composing three scurrilous poems, namely "B-rns in Lochly", "B-rns in his Infancy" and "B-rns's Hen Clockin in Mauchline".

Now he is fifteen years and mair,
There's not his match in any where,
Na, not in Clydesdale nor Ayrshire,
He beats our Lairds;
His grandfather's gi'en him plenty lear,
To play his cards.

David Sillar had compared Tait's poetic muse to ".. a tumbling cart, wantin' shoon'". This refers to a type of cart with an ungreased tree axle and no iron tyres, infamous for the almost intolerable screeching sound they made. Tait wrote of Sillar that "There's nane can sound the bawdy horn, like you and Burns." This highlighted the pairs mutual enjoyment of bawdry pursuits. Tait was a much older than either Burns or Sillars and may have been doubly insulted by these young poets usurping his position as the local bard.

Another retaliatory work was "Sillar and Tait; or, Tit for Tat":

My pipe wi'wind I maun gae fill'er,
And play a tune to Davie Sillar;

Tait undertook to "..trace his pedigree, Because he made a sang on me". This suggests that Burns had written cutting verses regarding his poetic efforts, but they have not survived.

Tait was well aware of the legal dispute over Lochlie Farm rents, etc. between William Burnes and his landlord David McLure and waded in with his own views:

McLure he put you in a farm,
And coft you coals your arse to warm,
And meal and maut - ye did get barm,
And then it wrought,
For his destruction and his harm,
It is my thought.

He likewise did the mailing stock,
And built you barns, the doors did lock,
His ain gun ye did at him cock,
And never spar'd,
Wi't owre his head came a clean knock,
Maist kill'd the Laird.

The horse, corn, pets, kail, kye and lures,
Cheese, pease, beans, rye, wood, house, and flours,
Pots, pans, crans, tongs, brace-spits, and skeurs,
The milk and barm,
Each thing they had was a' M'Lure's,
He stock'd the farm.

Not satisfied with this diatribe Tait dedicated a poem entitled "A Compliment" to James Grieve, the unofficial provost of Tarbolton:

Sir, for M'Lure he fought so fair
'Gainst Burns and Lawyers in Air,
He trimm'd their jacket to a hair
So wantonlie,
No toil nor travel he did spare
To win the plea.

In "A Journey to Destruction" he mentions the feud between Burns and McLure:

Like Catholic country's scarlet whore,
The wat that Burns play'd wi' McLure,
Who then had money was na sure.

Jean Armour's second confinement gave Tait another opportunity to deepen his feud with Burns:

The wives they up their coats did kilt,
And through the streets so clean did stilt,
Some at the door fell wi' a pelt
Maist broke their leg,
To see the hen, poor wanton jilt!
Lay her fourth egg.

Burns had failed to ingratiate himself into the company of the Alexander's of Ballochmyle, however Tait wrote a song that was not only popular locally, but caught the ear of Mrs Helenora Alexander of Ballochmyle and he was invited to visit and to present the piece to the family. Tait was well rewarded for the composition and unlike Burns he became a ".. privileged frequenter of the hall".

Tait's historical significance lies in his association and interactions with the genius of Robert Burns, his verses otherwise would have become forgotten and his publication is a great rarity. In this respect Tait has much in common with John Lapraik and David Sillar who also published their poems and songs with a similar descent into obscurity and financial emabarassment.

Tait concluded his book with the stanza:

Wi' this my book I think I'll close,
I'll love my friends, I'll fight my foes;
If they be cheery, I'll rejoice,
And wi' them reel,
I'll say my grace, and sup my brose,
So fare ye weel.

== See also ==
- Poems, Chiefly in the Scottish Dialect
- Poems, Chiefly in the Scottish Dialect (Edinburgh Edition)
- Poems by David Sillar
- Glenriddell Manuscripts
- Robert Burns World Federation
- Burns Clubs
