= Garpel Water =

River in East Ayrshire, Scotland

Coordinates: 55°31′N 4°05′W

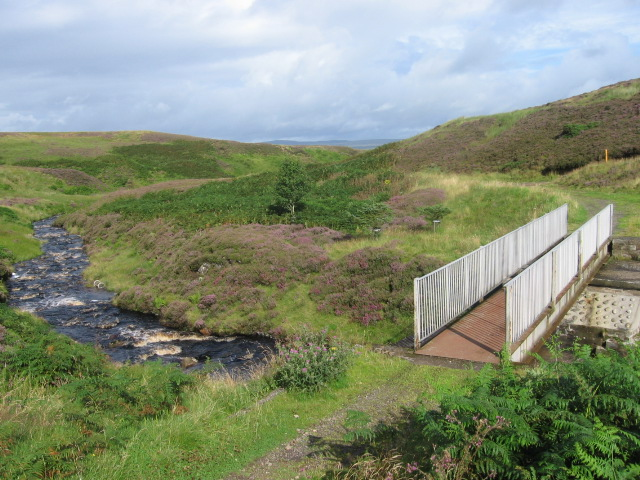
Bridge over Garpel Water

The Garpel Water is a river near Muirkirk, Scotland. It flows under the Sanquhar bridge and Tibbie's Brig. It flows into the River Ayr.
