= Fail Loch =

Coordinates: 55°31′53.8″N 4°29′42.5″W

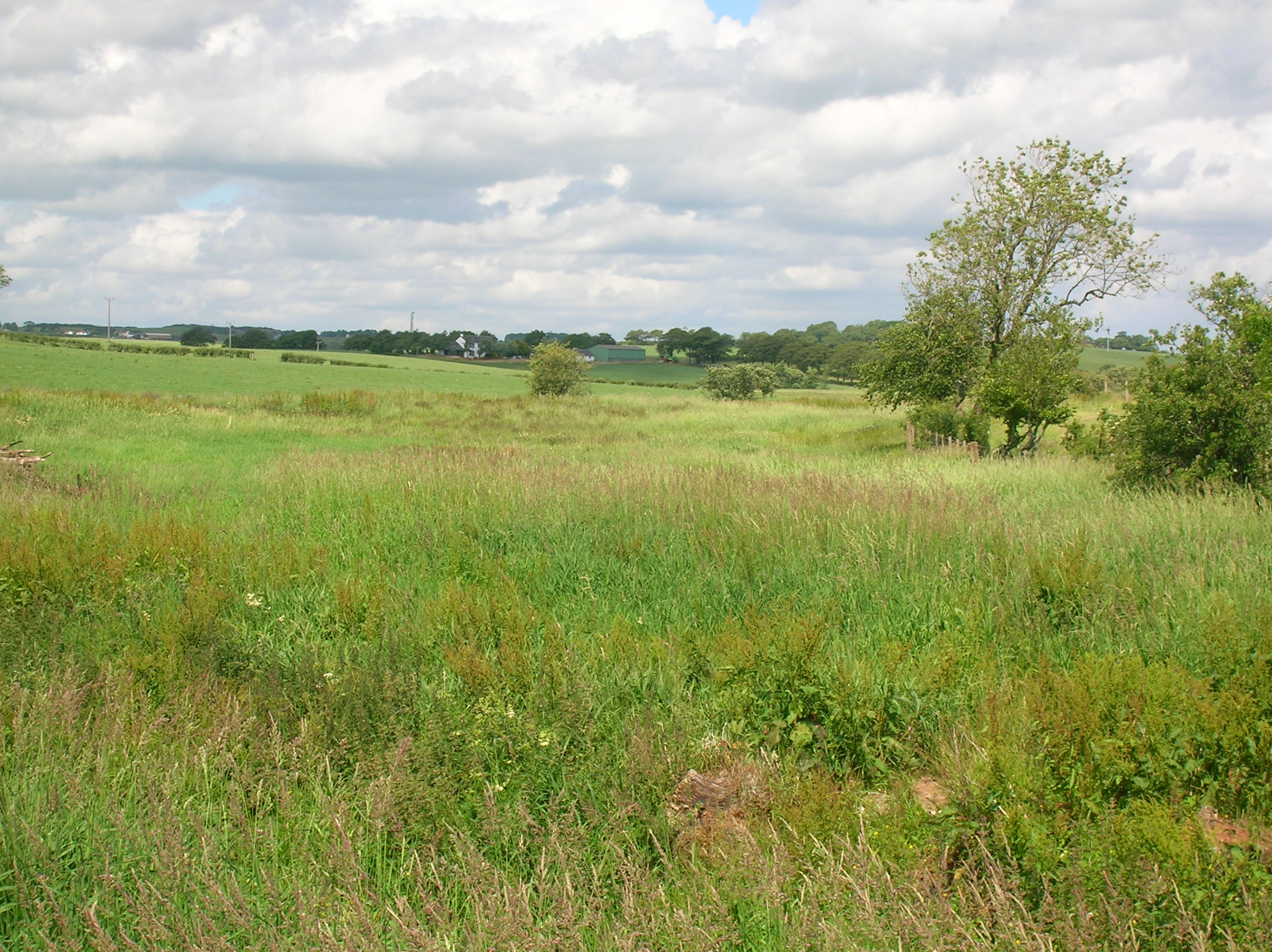
- The site of Fail Loch

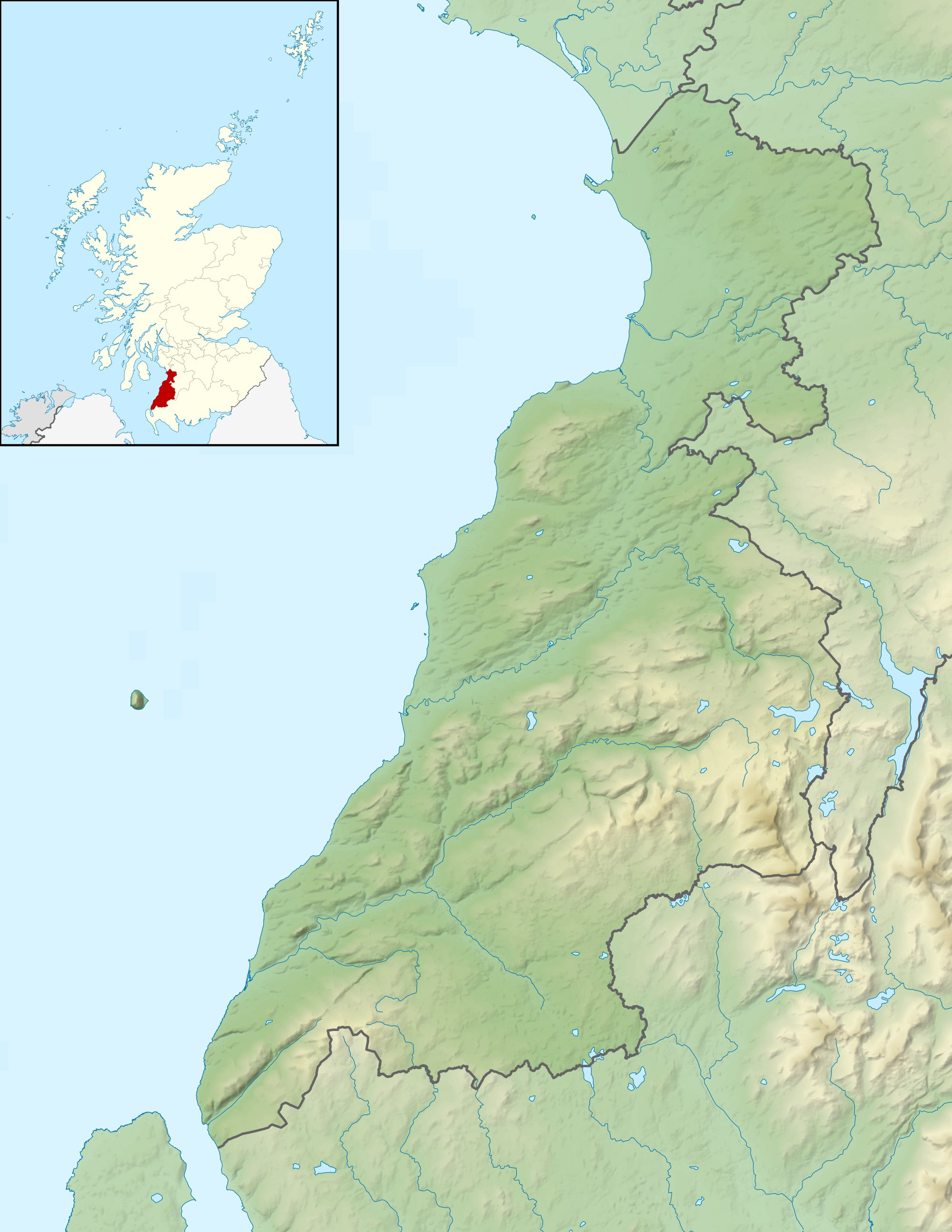
- Location within South Ayrshire
- Location: Tarbolton, South Ayrshire, Scotland
- Type: Drained freshwater loch
- Primary inflows: Townend Burn and the Mill Burn
- Primary outflows: Water of Fail
- Basin countries: Scotland
- Islands: One
- Settlements: Tarbolton

Fail Loch or Faile Loch was situated in a low-lying area near the old monastery of Fail in the Parish of Tarbolton, South Ayrshire, Scotland. The old Lochlea Loch lies nearby and its waters still feed into Fail Loch via the Mill Burn.

== History ==
The loch is recorded as 'Valle' in 1307, and 'Feil' in the 17th century. Feill' (1732), 'Faill' or 'Ffele' are further names recorded for the site. Paterson states that the loch once surrounded the Fail Monastery so that it sat on an island. The surviving portion of the seasonal loch is located to the north of the old monastery site.

In 1504 it is recorded that turf and masses of earth on land belonging to the House of Failford were used for repairing a breakout of Fail Loch and lade to the north and west where the border with the lands of the Abbot of Melrose lay.

In Robert Burns's day Fail Loch was one of three plains that were flooded in winter to supply power for the mill that only worked once the harvest was gathered. It was a haunt for otters and kingfishers amongst other wildlife.

Shaw relates in the 1950s that Lochlee, Fail Loch and Tarbolton Loch are no longer so full of water as when they were required to supply water for the meal mills, and gave good skating and curling in a hard winter. They are now to a large extent drained away, but are still the haunt of snipe, goose, duck, and swan.

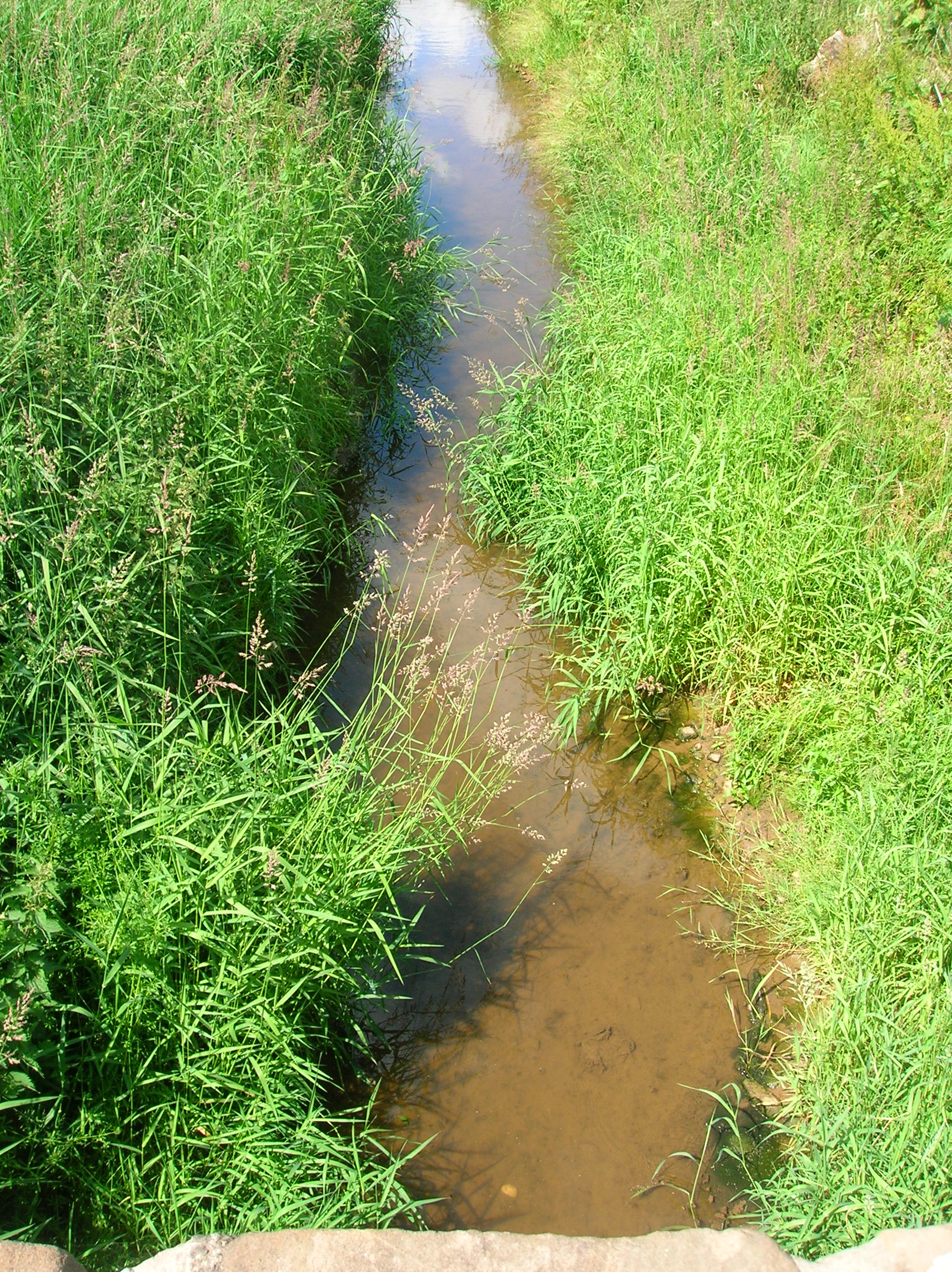
The Water of Fail near Fail Castle Cottage

=== Fail Mill ===
The Duke of Portland abolished thirlage in mid-19th century, making Millburn Mill, and its head of water, Lochlea, redundant resulting in active attempts at drainage at both Fail and Lochlea causing their effective demise circa 1840. Much of the loch lands of Fail Loch became part of the fields of the surrounding farms and properties, such as Mosside, Lilylaw, Adamhill, and Boghead, however a portion remained prone to seasonal flooding.

The waters of the Townend and Mill Burns still contribute to the flow towards the old Fail Mill that stood on the rivulet, known from this point on, as the Water of Fail and survived into the 20th century. Much of the surrounding lands in the area, originally belonged to the monks from Fail Monastery. The old Monk's Road forms a boundary on the east side of the old loch.

William Muir was the tenant of the Mill of Fail at the time of Robert Burns.

The OS maps show the presence of a dam and mill pond which would have negated the need for the existence of the loch as a head of water for the mill.

In 1840 three cinerary urns were found at Fail Mill and were donated to the Mechanics Museum in Ayr by Mr Andrew of Fail Mill.

=== Drainage ===
Although the loch's drainage may have begun in the 18th century when Alexander Montgomerie, 10th Earl of Eglinton, was pursuing a number of agricultural improvements on his extensive estates and other landowners followed his example, further drainage work may have taken place in the 1740s as part of the improvements undertaken to provide employment for Irish estate workers during the Irish potato famines of the 1740s and the mid 19th centuries. Many drainage schemes also date to the end of World War I when many soldiers returned en masse to civilian life.

=== Cartographic evidence ===
Blaeu's map of 1654, dating from Timothy Pont's survey of circa 1604, clearly shows and names the loch and indicates that it was somewhat larger than Lochlea Loch. Roy's map of 1747 shows no loch present. Thomson map of 1832 does not record a loch, although Loch Brown and Lochlea Loch are marked.

The 19th century Ordnance Survey maps show the site as 'Fail Loch' and state that it is liable to flooding, and the drainage remains inadequate and the area dominated by marsh plants. Paterson records that part of Fail Loch remains in the 1860s.

Previous location of Fail Loch, South Ayrshire

== Micro-history ==
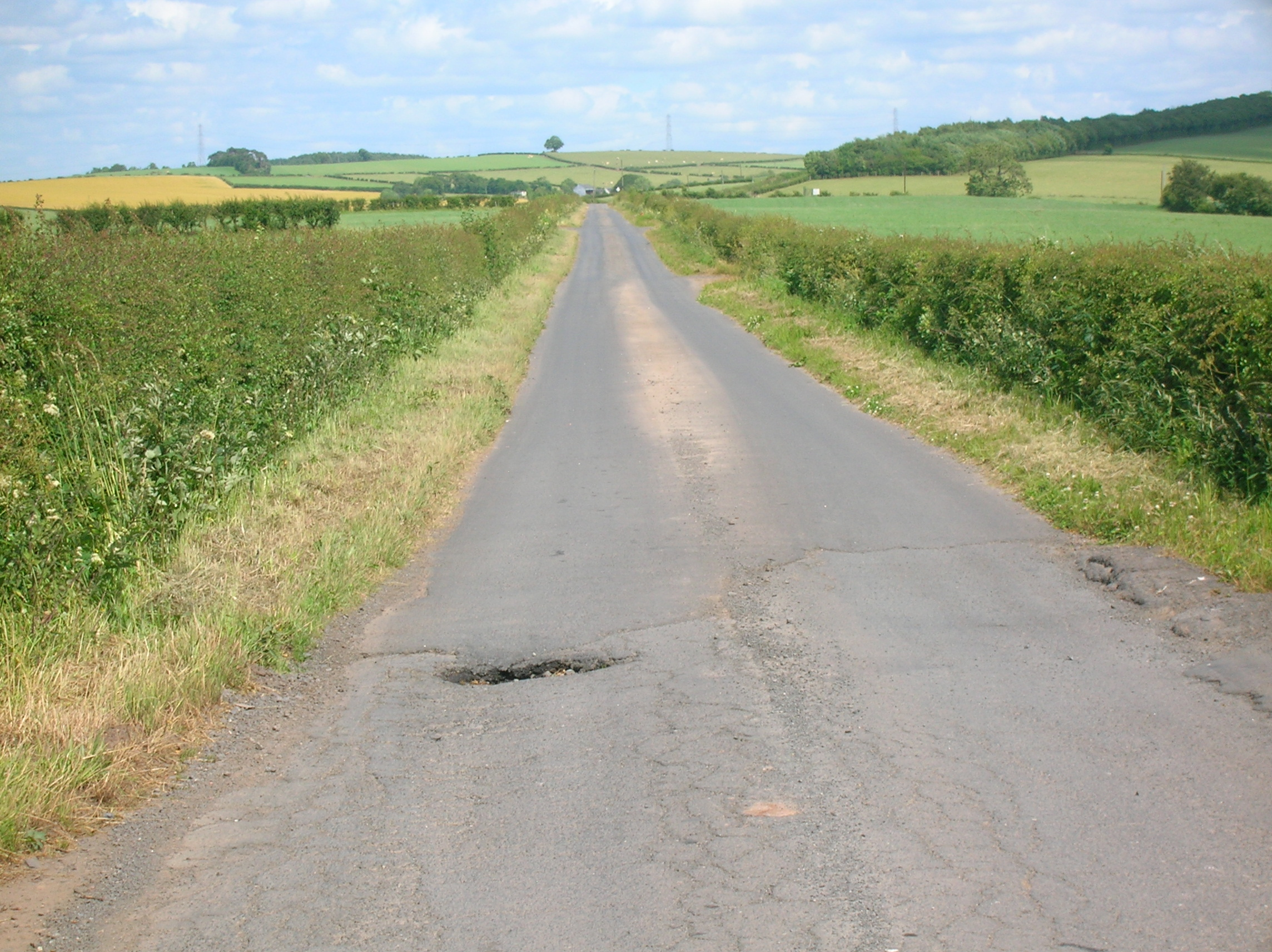
The Monk's Road.

Fail Loch is the site of a wildfowl Wetland Bird Survey (WEBS) count. Fail Loch, a Scottish Wildlife Trust designated site is also important as a wetland with over 125 plant species recorded.

Tarbolton Curling Club used Loch Fail in the 19th century, showing that it was prone to winter flooding at that time.

== See also ==
- Lochlea, South Ayrshire
- Loch Brown
- Tarbolton
- Fail Monastery
