= Willie McCulloch (footballer, born 1927) =

Scottish footballer

Personal information
- Full name: William Barrie McCulloch
- Date of birth: 24 May 1927
- Place of birth: Tarbolton, Scotland
- Date of death: 7 March 2013 (aged 85)
- Place of death: Prestwick, Scotland
- Position: Winger

Youth career
- Muirkirk

Senior career*
Years	Team	Apps	(Gls)
1946–1949	Kilmarnock	9	(3)
1949–1950	Cumnock		
1950–1957	Airdrieonians	175	(60)
1957–1959	St Mirren	35	(5)
1959	Greenock Morton	5	(1)
- Newton Stewart

International career
1956	Scotland B	1	(1)

Managerial career
- Newton Stewart
- * Club domestic league appearances and goals

William Barrie McCulloch (24 May 1927 – 7 March 2013) was a Scottish professional football player and coach.
