= Failford =

Hamlet in South Ayrshire, Scotland

Coordinates: 55°30′18″N 4°26′25″W

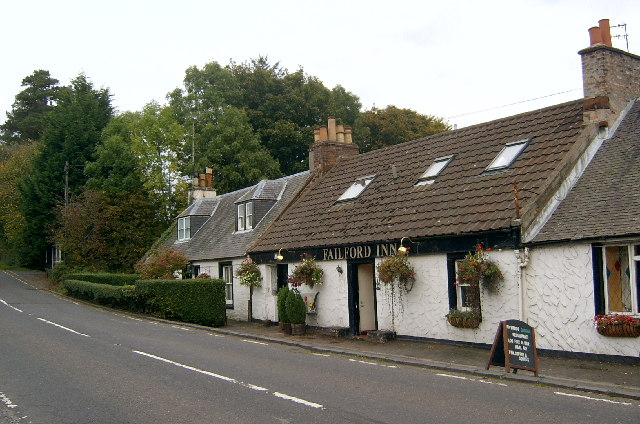
The Failford Inn

Failford (Scots: Failfuird) is a hamlet in South Ayrshire, Scotland. It is 4 kilometres (2.5 mi) west of Mauchline, where the Water of Fail flows into the River Ayr.

== History ==
A minor ford would have been located where the Water of Fail has its confluence with the River Ayr however the name of the hamlet is also linked to the major ford over the River Ayr that led to a lane leading up into the Fail Hill Woods on the eastern bank, one termination being what may have been a sandstone quarry. The ford branched off from the old toll road just prior to the first building in the row of houses that includes the Failford Inn. By 1895 this ford was out of use apart from an access for farmers to collect stones and sand from the river for agricultural and other purposes.

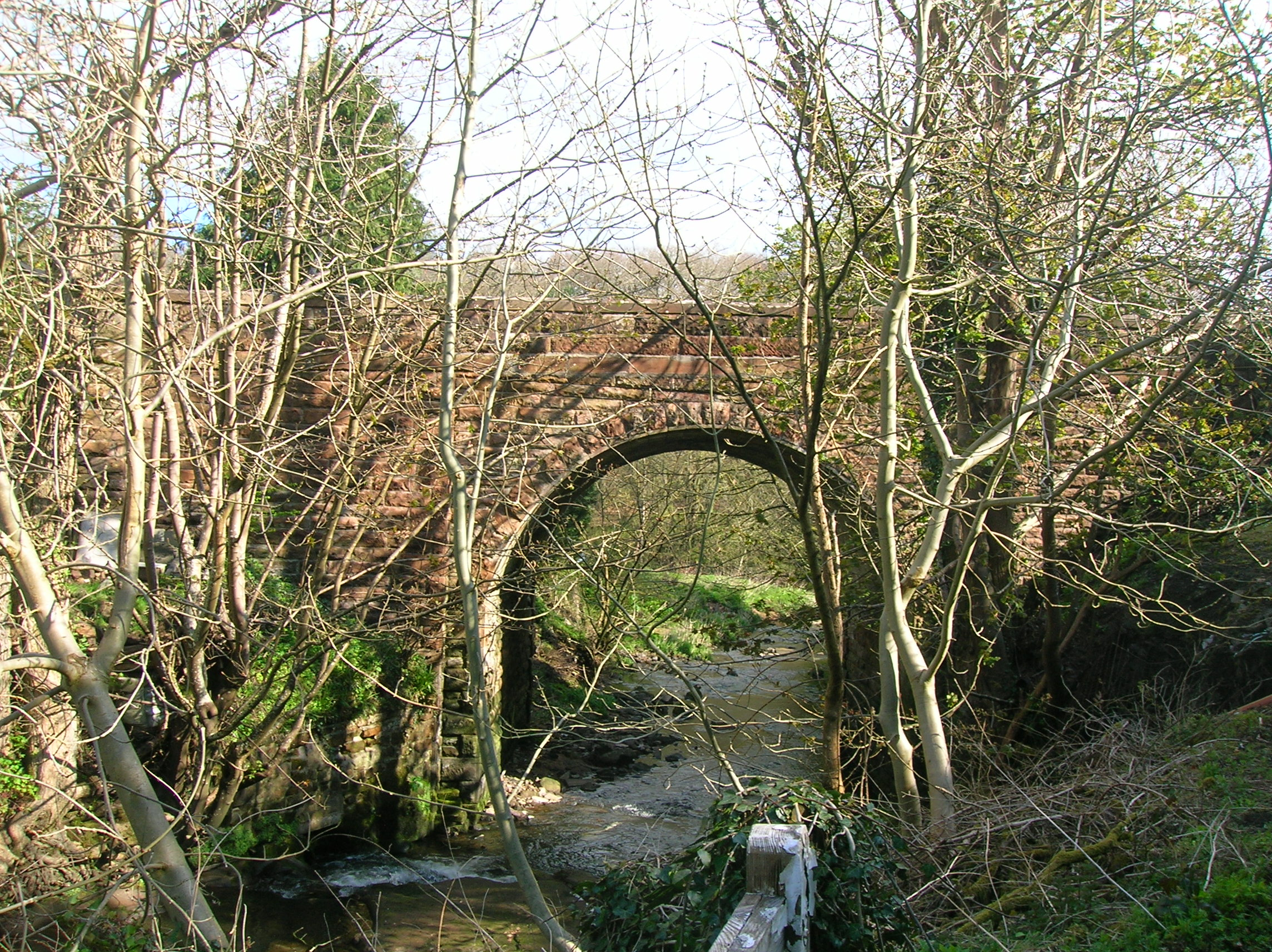
The Water of Fail at Failford

=== Robert Burns and Highland Mary ===
The betrothal of the poet Robert Burns and "Highland Mary" (Mary Campbell) is said to have taken place here in 1786 or at nearby Coilsfield. In 1921, local Freemasons erected a memorial stone to commemorate this event. By 1895 the ford is no longer shown.

=== The Failford almshouses ===
One unusual feature of the village is a range of Almshouses that were constructed using funds from a bequest and had conditions of character, situation and age attached as recorded in 1846 :- "A range of almshouses was erected and endowed, by a bequest of the late Alexander Cooper, Esq., of Smithston, at Failford, near the junction of the Ayr and Fail rivers, for eight persons, who have each a weekly allowance and an allotment of garden ground. The hospital is spacious and handsome, and is designed for inhabitants of Tarbolton and Mauchline, in indigent circumstances, upwards of forty years of age, and who have never solicited alms".

=== Montgomerie Quarry ===
By 1895 a fairly substantial red sandstone quarry had developed at the northern end of Coilsholm Wood, known as Montgomerie Quarry after the owners of the Coilsfield or Montgomery Castle estate, linked by a fright branch to the Mauchline to Ayr railway line. This provided local employment and after it ceased to work the quarry flooded and still exists as such (datum 2017).

=== Peden's Pulpit ===
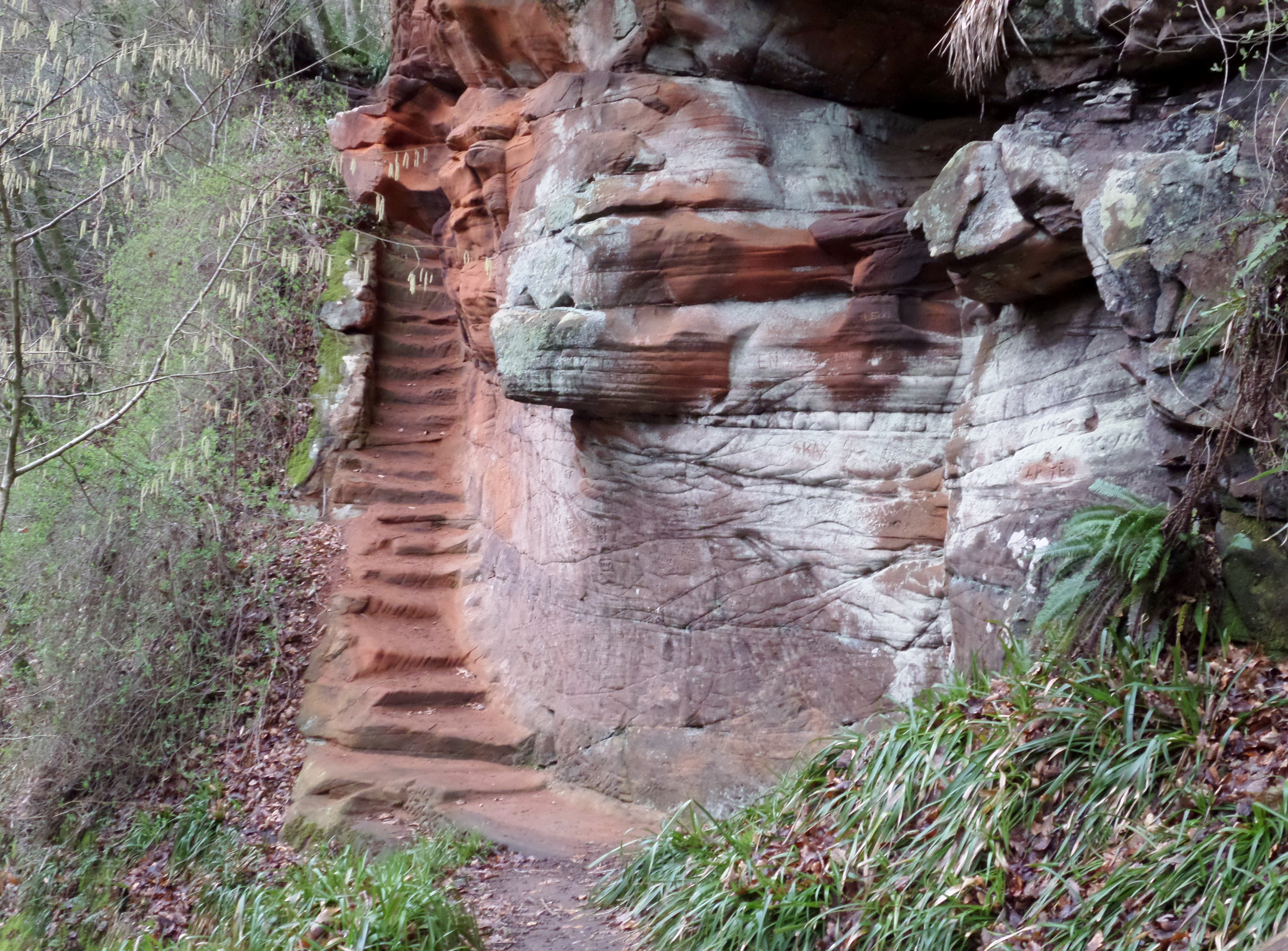
Peden's Pulpit.

In the 17th century the covenanter minister Alexander Peden is said to have held conventicles in the remote Coilsholm Wood using a sandstone outcrop that overlooked the River Ayr and this is known as 'Peden's Pulpit'. A path through the nature reserve runs to the site and an interpretation board has been supplied by the Scottish Wildlife Trust. A set of steps were later cut into the rock to provide access to the upper path however this is now too worn to be used safely.

== Natural history ==
The nearby Scottish Wildlife Trust Ayr Gorge Woodlands nature reserve in Coilsholm wood is a Site of Special Scientific Interest, notable for its ancient woodland of oak, ash and beech.

== Micro-history ==
A toll house was located on the road to Mauchline at Woodhead on the lane up to the old Failford tileworks on the Yonderton Burn below Tunnockhill Farm. The name Failford also officially applied as late as 1842 to the nearby hamlet at Fail where the Trinitarian Fail Monastery once stood. Its ford was located about 80 yards downstream from Fail Bridge.

Substantial quantities of wood were removed from the Coilsholm policies during WWII and the concrete bases of the sawmill machinery are still extant on the path to Alexander Peden's Pulpit.
