= River Ayr =

River in Scotland

Coordinates: 55.46803°N 4.63863°W

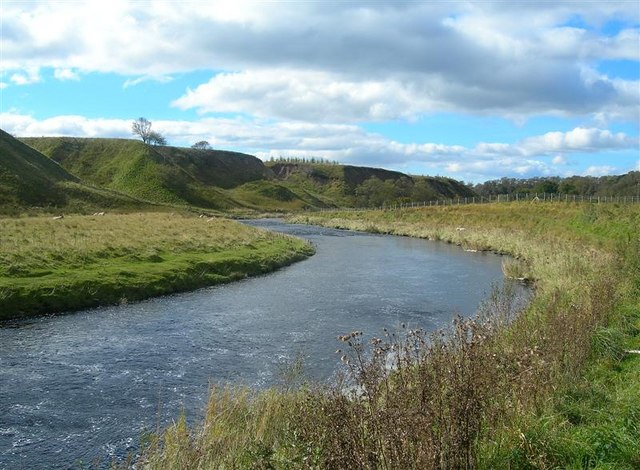
- The River Ayr Looking towards Alder Glen, from the River Ayr Way.
- Native name: Uisge Àir (Scottish Gaelic)

Location
- Country: Scotland
- Counties: Ayrshire
- Settlements: Ayr, Catrine, Muirkirk

Physical characteristics
- Source: Glenbuck Loch
  - location: Muirkirk, Scotland
- Mouth: Ayr Harbour, Firth of Clyde
  - location: Ayr, Scotland
- Length: 65 km (40 mi)
- Discharge
  - location: Lugar Water

Basin features
- Tributaries
  - left: Lugar Water, Garpel Water
  - right: Greenock Water

The River Ayr (/ɛər/ AIR; Scottish Gaelic: Uisge Àir) is a river in Ayrshire, Scotland. At 65 km (40 mi) it is the longest river in the county.

The river was held as sacred by pre-Christian cultures. The remains of several prehistoric sacrificial horse burials have been found along its banks, mainly concentrated around the town of Ayr.

== Etymology ==
The name Ayr may come from a pre-Celtic word meaning "watercourse". Ayr could also be of Brittonic derivation, perhaps from the element *ar, an ancient river-name element implying horizontal movement. The town of Ayr was formerly known as Inver Ayr meaning "mouth of the Ayr" (see Inver), but this was later shortened to just Ayr.

== Geography ==
The River Ayr has a catchment area of 574 km^{2} (222 sq mi).

The river originates at Glenbuck Loch in East Ayrshire, close to the border with Lanarkshire. It winds its way through East and South Ayrshire to its mouth at the town of Ayr, where it empties into the Firth of Clyde.

On its way, the river passes through the villages of Muirkirk, Sorn, Catrine, Failford, Stair and Annbank, as well as passing the location of (the now ruined) Ayr Castle. The largest settlements being Ayr, Cumnock, Catrine, Ochiltree, Muirkirk and Sorn.

Major land uses within the catchment area are agriculture, forestry, mining, leisure and recreation and urban development.

=== Tributaries ===
Principal tributaries include:

- Greenock Water
- Lugar Water
- Water of Fail
- Water of Coyle.

== River Ayr Way ==
Many practitioners of hillwalking and other related activities are probably aware that the river is pathed for upwards of 90% of its length. Due to disputes with estate owners and weather damage, the walk does temporarily abandon the river in a couple of locations. The path begins in the former village of Glenbuck, now a casualty of opencast mining and general industry decline. It follows the river from its source at Glenbuck Loch and ends at the coastal town of Ayr, where the river empties into the ocean at the Firth of Clyde. Typically the walk is done in 2 or 3 stages.
