= Fail Monastery =

Former monastery in Ayrshire, Scotland

Coordinates: 55.5259°N 4.5024°W

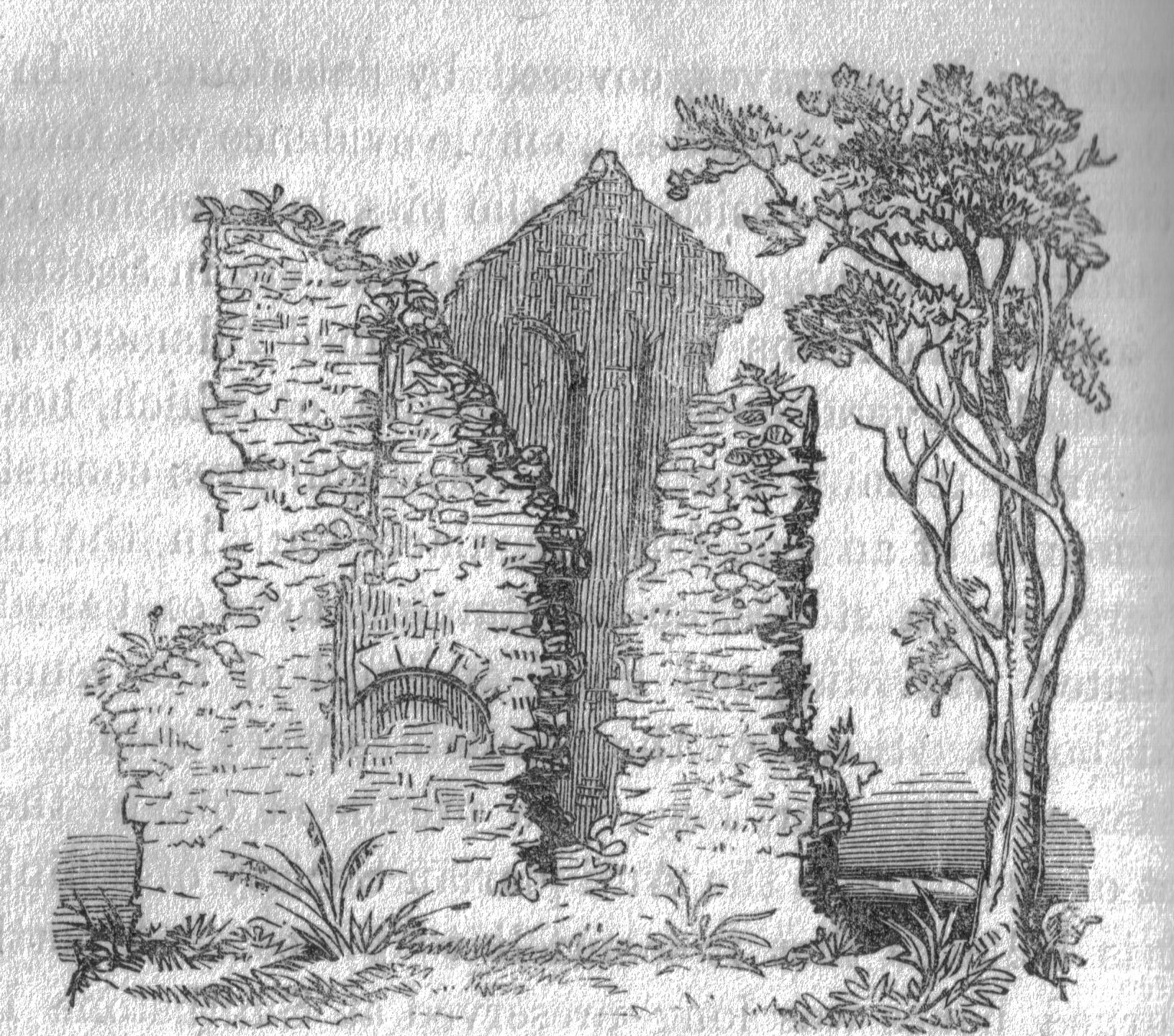
- Interactive map of Fail Monastery

Monastery information
- Order: Trinitarian
- Established: circa 1252
- Disestablished: 1561
- Mother house: Saint Mathurian, Paris

People
- Founder: Andrew Bruce

Fail Monastery, occasionally known as Failford Abbey, had a dedication to 'Saint Mary', and was located at Fail (NS 42129 28654) on the bank of the Water of Fail, Parish of Tarbolton near the village of Tarbolton, South Ayrshire. Most of the remaining monastery ruins were removed in 1952. The official and rarely used title was House of the Holy Trinity of Failford or the Ministry of Failford.

== History ==
Other spelling variations for the monastery are 'Valle' (1307), 'Faleford' (1368), 'Feil' (1654), 'Feill' (1732), 'Faill' or 'Ffele' References refer loosely to the friars and the establishment is sometimes marked on maps as a priory.

== The Trinitarians ==
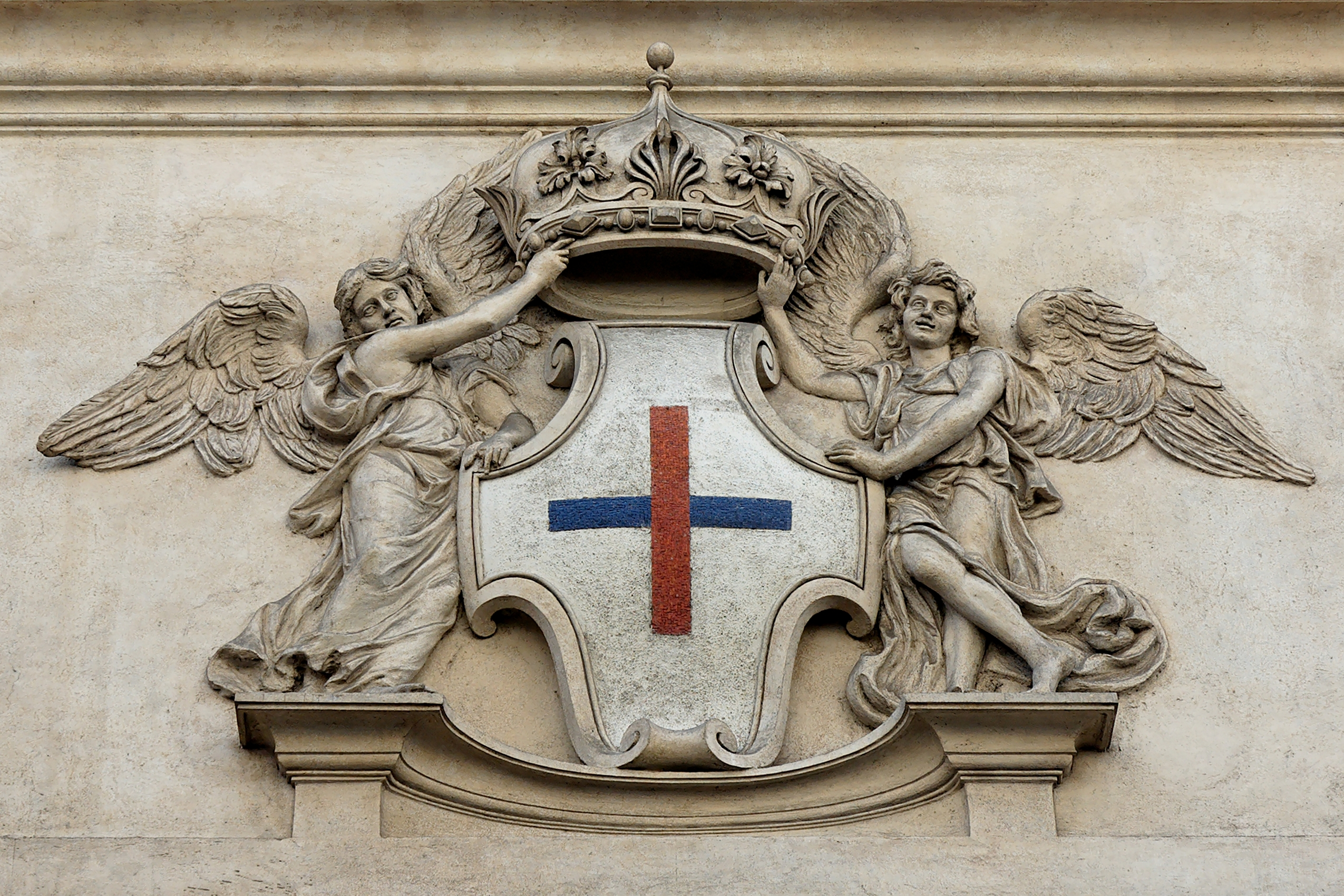
Stone emblem of the Trinitarian Order on the façade of San Carlo alle Quattro Fontane (1638–1641) in Rome

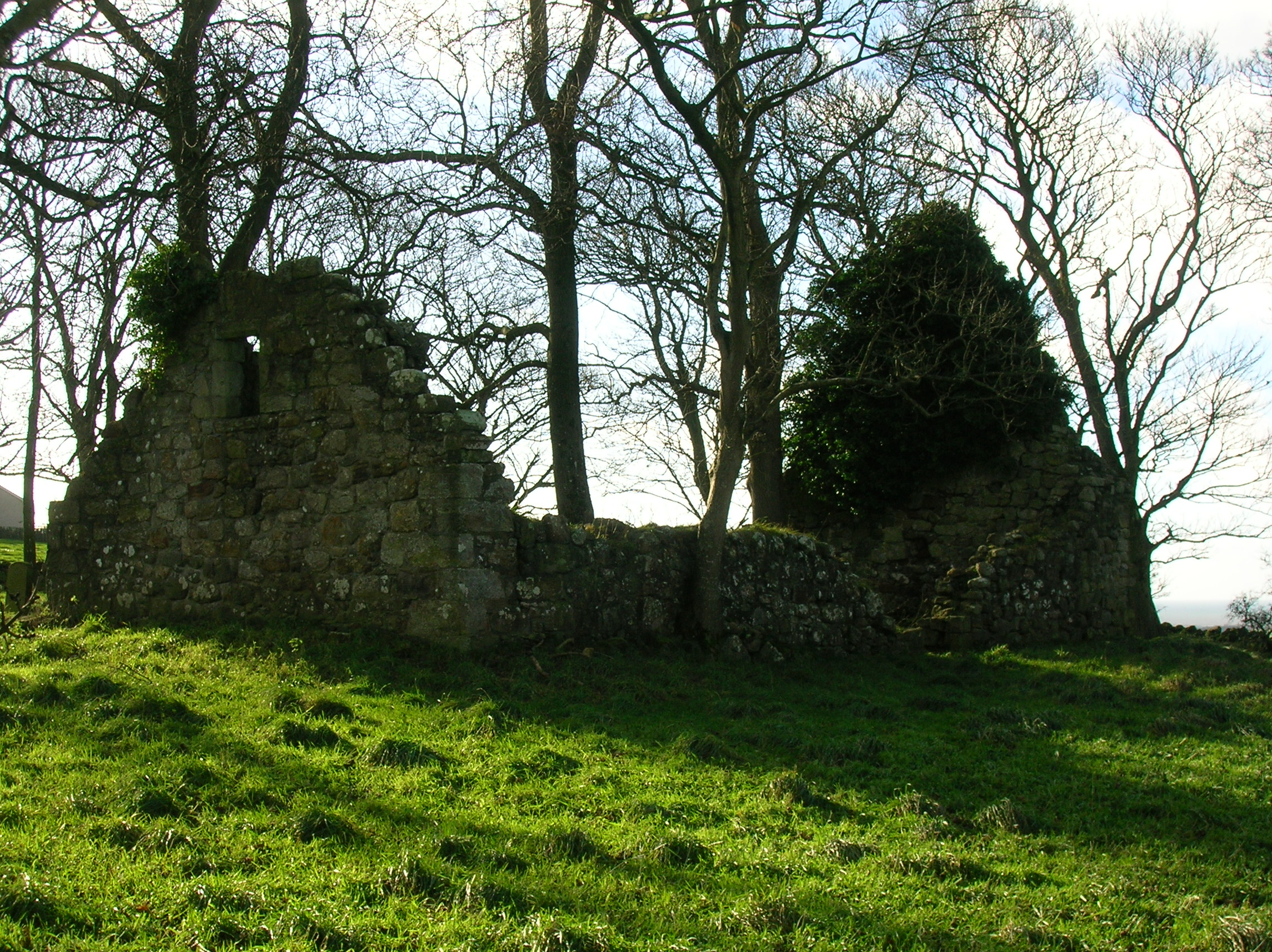
Barnweill Kirk ruins

Also known as the "Red Friars", or "Mathurines" from the monastery of Saint Mathurin in Paris. The friars were charged with the duty of saving captives from slavery and as such, were called Fratres de Redemptione Captivorum or "The Fathers of Redemption". The friars either paid the ransom of Christians or purchased pagan captives to exchange for Christians. The friars wore a white outer garment with a red and blue cross on the shoulder or over the breast. They were not permitted to ride horses and had to use asses for transport.

In Scotland the order had friaries at Aberdeen; Berwick; Dirleton; Dunbar; Houston (East Lothian); Peebles; and Scotlandswell. Kettins in Angus, only a parish church, was however appropriated to the Trinitarian friars.

William Aiton records that the monastery was established by John de Graham, Lord of Tarbolton in 1252, however Love regards Andrew Bruce as being the founder.

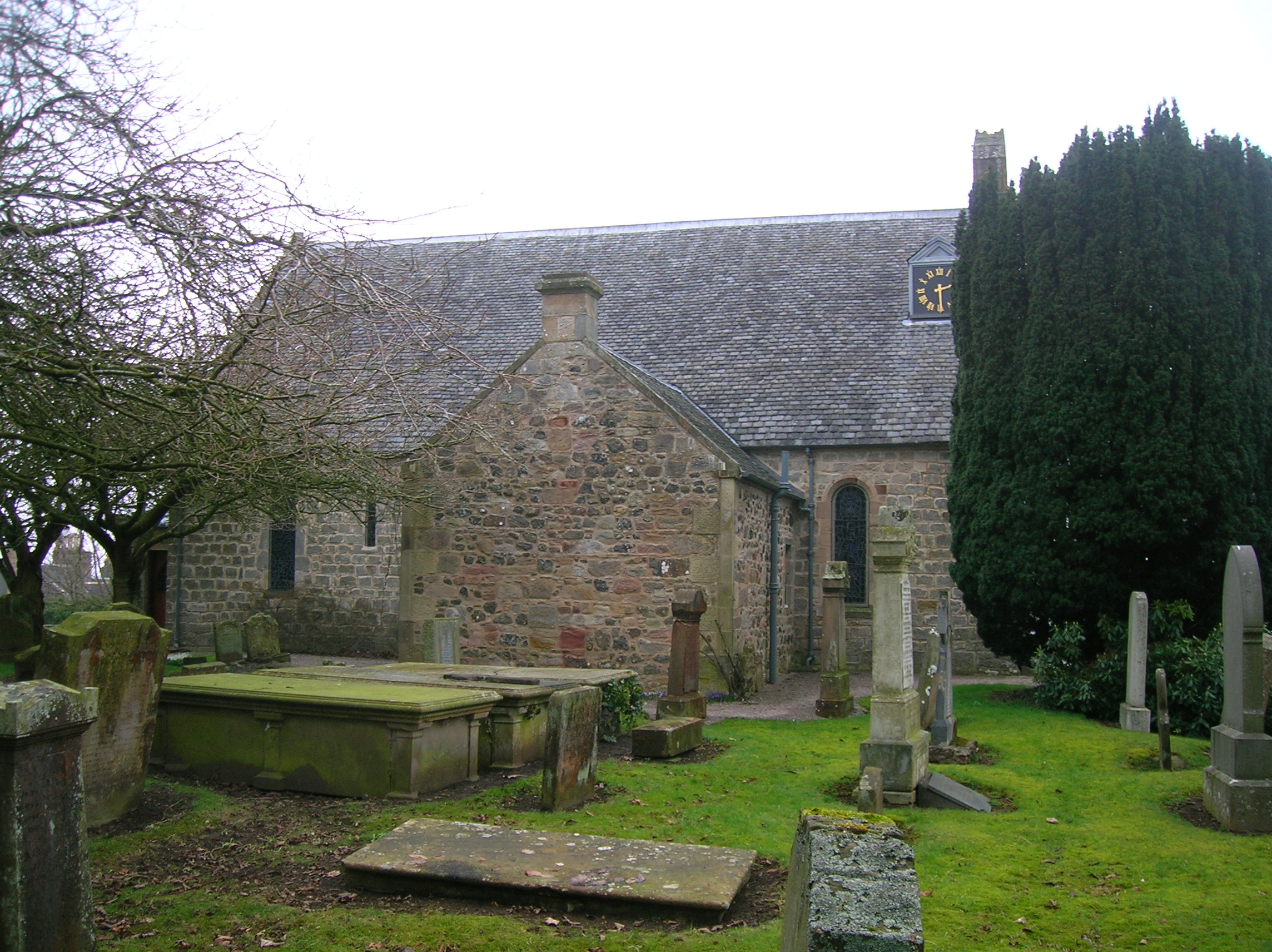
Symington Church, once held by Fail Monastery.

The monastery originally lay within the civil and ecclesiastical Parish of Barnweil or Barnwell, which was suppressed in 1673, its lands joining the Parishes of Craigie and Tarbolton. Founded about 1252, the monastery was partially destroyed by fire in 1349 or 1359. Two thirds of the monastery's income was ordered to be spent on redeeming Christian slaves and as a consequence and also as an order, the Trinitarians buildings were not overly ornate.

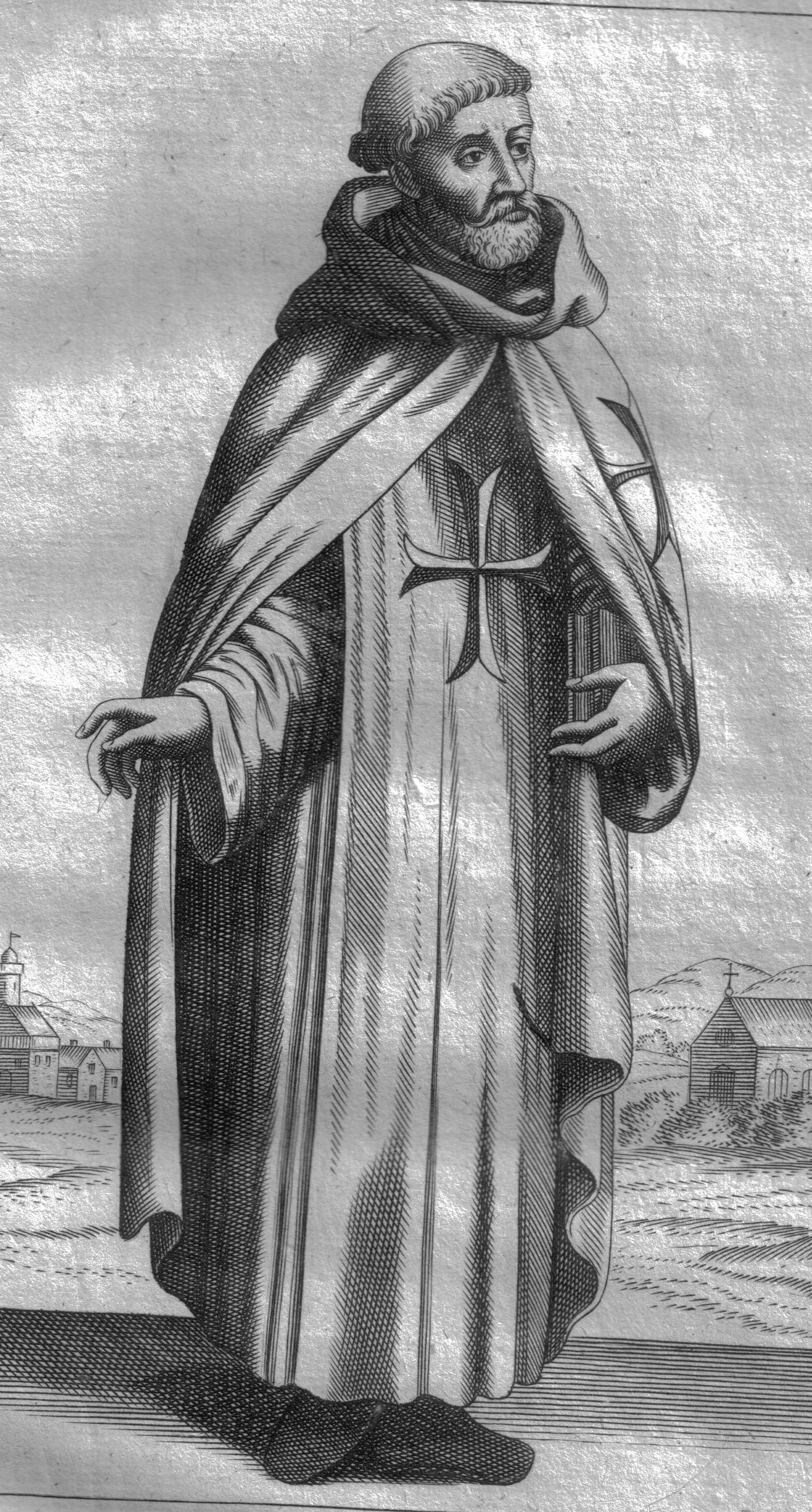
A Trinitarian friar of the 17th century

Although Tarbolton was twice subject to the jurisdiction of the friars of Fail, it did not remain with them, but remained an independent rectory. In 1429 Tarbolton was erected into a prebend or canonry of Glasgow Cathedral. Barnweil, a vicarage of the friars of Fail, was annexed partly to Tarbolton, and partly to Craigie in 1653. The church ruins, which stood near to an old castle of the same name, have been allowed to go to total ruin.

The principal of Trinitarian monasteries was called the 'Minister' and as head of the order in Scotland, had a seat in the Scottish Parliament. In 1343 John was the Minister of the House of the Holy Trinity and he persuaded, by the gift a white horse, John de Graham, Lord of Tarbolton, to revoke his gift of the rights of patronage to the kirk of Tarbolton and the lands of Unthank. John stole the white horse back and the agreement was nullified

In 1368 John Stewart, Earl of Carrick and Lord of Kyle-Stewart confirmed a charter of 1338 made by John of Grame, Lord of Tarbolton, conveying the rights of patronage and advowson of Tarbolton Church to God and the house of Faleford, the minister and brothers, and their successors of the order of holy Trinity and Captives ... Hugh of Eglintoun, Lord of that Ilk and others bore witness.

Friar William Houston became Minister of Fail in the early 16th century however his nephew attempted to oust him and went so far as to invade Failford "..with a body of supporters armed with balistas, bows, mangonels and all sorts of offensive arms, and had broken down the gate and all the doors in an attempt to oust the minister."

In 1546 Robert Cunninghame was the 'Minister' of Fail, living off the income and not carrying out the responsibilities of the position, indeed the community of friars at Fail had been the subject of several investigations since the mid-fifteenth century. Robert was married and also held the lands of Montgreenan whilst continuing to use the title of 'Minister' and to act as the provincial of the Trinitarian Order in Scotland.

In 1642 William Hunter was the ruling Elder.

The parish churches of Barnweill, Symington, and Galston in old Kyle, Torthorwald in old Dumfriesshire, and Inverchoalan in old Argylshire, belonged to the Monastery of Fail. Saint Anne's Well, Monk Muir and the Monk Road within the parish of Galston evoke links with the Monastery of Fail. At Symington it is recorded that The church of Symonstoun was granted to the convent which was founded at Feil, or Faile, in Kyle, during the year 1252, and it continued to belong to that convent until the Reformation. The cure was served by a vicar pensioner who had a settled income and a glebe, and the minister and brothers of Faile enjoyed the remainder of the tithes and revenues.

The monks of Melrose held extensive lands in the area and were in close competition with the Friars of Fail for lands and income.

In the reign of Robert II (1371–1390) the patronage of the 'Kirk of Fail' was granted to James de Lindsay of Crawforde and in 1470 James de Quhit of Fale is mentioned. In 1562 Robert Cuninghame was the Minister of Fail.

It is recorded in 1562 that the Laird of Lamont, such was his contempt for the Minister of Fail, had paid no rent for six years.

The character of the friars is recalled in these lines –

"The Friars of Fail drank berry-brown ale,
The best that ever was tasted,
The Monks of Melrose made gude kael,
On Fridays, when they fasted."

Another version expands the details of the friars way of life –

The Friars of Fail,
Gat never oure hard eggs or oure thin kale;
For they made their eggs thin wi' butter,
And their kale thick wi'bread;
And the Friars of Fail they made guid kale
On Fridays when they feasted,
And they never wanted gear enough,
As lang as their neighbour' lasted.

A Crown petition

In 1459 King James II and his Queen, Mary of Gueldress submitted a petition to suppress the Trinitarian Order and to pass their churches and revenues to the Trinity Collegiate Church and Hospital in Edinburgh. The given reason was that the friars were evil, unclean, and unfit to continue observance of their rule. The public outcry was such that the petition was refused, however an echo of substance in the allegations is derived from the above quoted rhyme.

=== Thomas the Rhymer ===
William Wallace's biographer, Thomas the Rhymer, is said to have been at Fail when William Wallace was imprisoned by the English in 1305. He is said to have been a frequent visitor to the Minister and may have retired to Failford and died there.

Thomas Rimour in to the Fail was than,
With the mynystir, quilk was a worthie man:
He wyst off to that religious place.

=== The dissolution of the monastery ===
The lords of Council ordered the destruction of the monastery in 1561, however two poor men still lived in the convent in 1562 and had £22 a year for subsistence while four old beidmen of the convent lived outside. The term 'convent' at that time did not infer a community of women.

In 1565, Robert Cunninghame, minister of Fail, granted a charter to J. Cunninghame Esq that conveyed to him the lands of Brownhill, and the farms of the Fail estate. William Wallace, brother of Sir Hugh Wallace of Craigie Castle appears to have then acquired the patronage of the monastery. He died in 1617.

The Wallace family of nearby Craigie carried out repairs the Ministers dwelling, converting it into more of a defensive structure, known locally as the 'Fail Castle' and marked as such on some of the contemporary maps.

== The castle ==
Circa 1617 William Wallace, grandson of Sir Hugh Wallace of Craigie, expected to inherit the property from his father, also William Wallace, known as Minister of Fail, the commendator. He listed the monastery lands as the manor place of Failford and the gardens known as the West Yaird, Neltoun Yaird, Gardine Yaird, Yeister Yaird, and Kirk Yaird.

In August 1618 Walter Whyteford was granted the Monastery of Fail in place of William Wallace; this grant was ratified by Parliament in 1621. The Whitefords also had properties at Blaiquharn (previously Whiteford) and Dunduff Castle near Dunure.

Blaeu's map of 1654 shows a fairly extensive wooded area around Feil Abbey (sic) with a pale around three sides and the final boundary as the Water of Fail.

The immunities derived from the monastery passed into the hands of the Earls of Dundonald and in 1690, William, Earl of Dundonald, was served heir to his father, John Earl of Dundonald, in the beneficies of Failford, spiritually as well as temporarily. The buildings were repaired after passing into the ownership of the Wallace family, and for a time became known as Fail Castle; the former monastery was allowed to fall derelict again after the time of the Laird of Whytford (sic).

In the 1860s the lands of Fail were held by Edward Hunter-Blair of Dunskey and Brounehill, second son of Sir D. Hunter-Blair of Blairquhan. The ruins consisted at this time of a gable and part of a side-wall of the 'castle'.

=== The final destruction of the monastery and castle ===
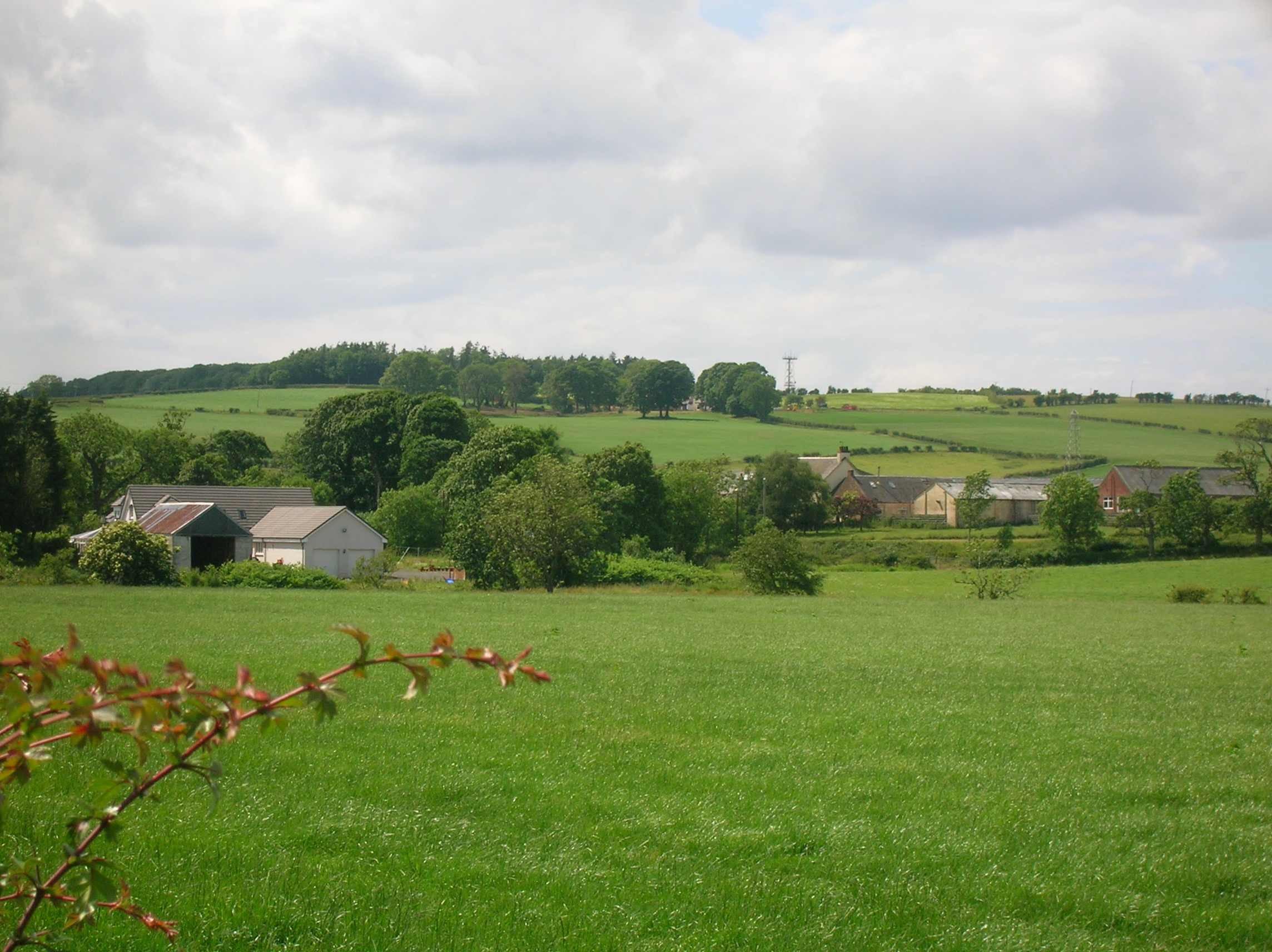
Fail Mill and Fail Mains from the Water of Fail bridge

The remains of Fail Monastery were removed and used as foundations for buildings and the runway at Prestwick Airport in 1952; some of the rubble was however collected and used to form a grotto on the north side of Annbank's Roman Catholic church. Possibly the ruins had become unacceptably dangerous.

=== The ruins prior to 1952 ===
Prior to the remains being dismantled, the ruins were mainly of a rectangular building, with three walls remaining, about 40 feet (12 metres) high. This building was probably the 16th-century tower or "manor-house", originally the "domus" of the head of the monastery and later the home of the commendator or Laird of Fail. The tower is said to have comprised at least three principal storeys. In 1875 Adamson observed that the ruins in 1875 consist of a gable and part of a side wall—in a stackyard near Fail toll.

=== Surviving remains ===
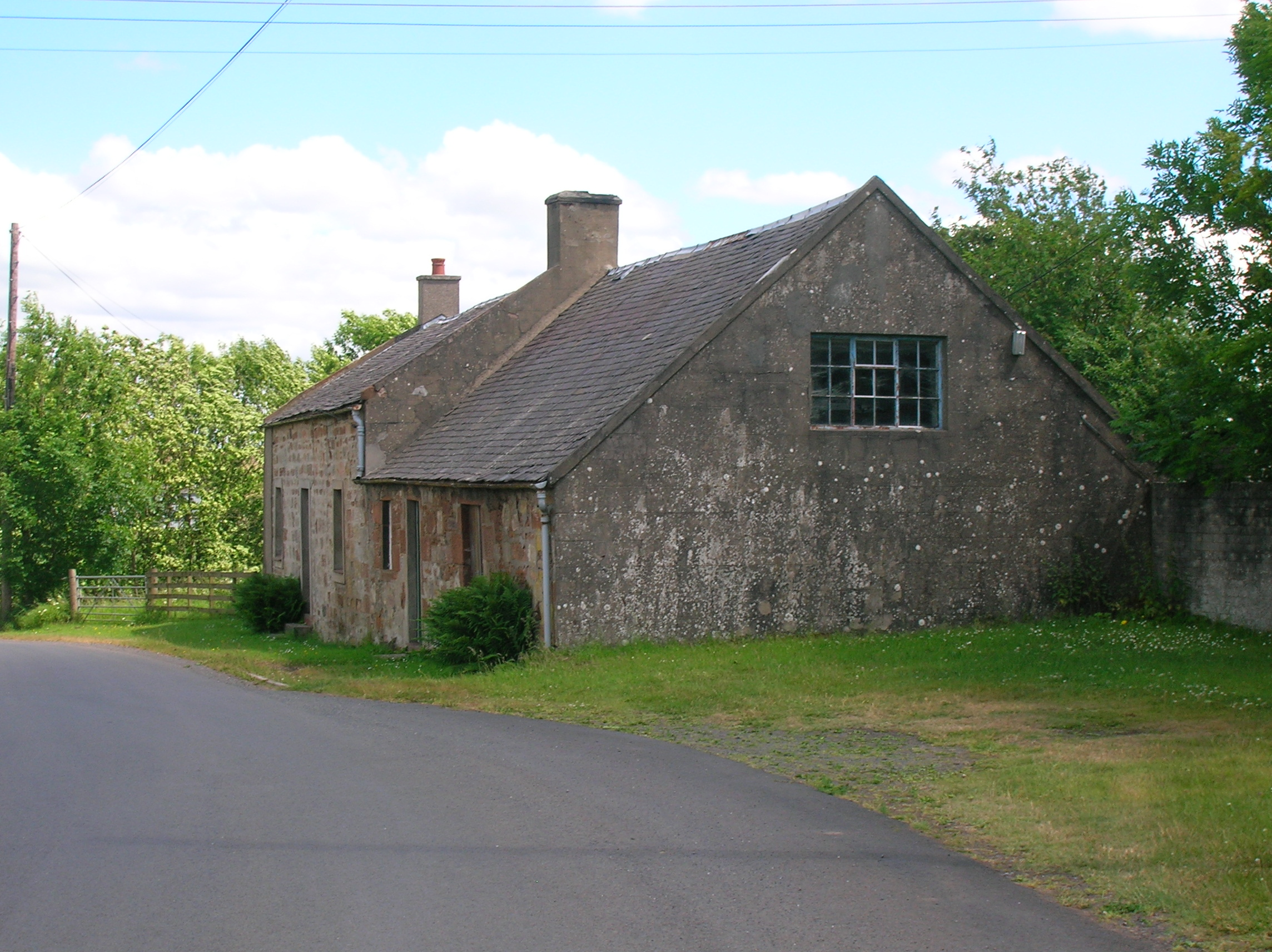
Fail Castle Cottage

The surviving ruins are near the Fail Castle cottage across from Fail Mains, and these comprise a fragment of wall (22 m long and up to 1.3 m high) revetting the break of the slope at the foot of the garden, 25 m south of the cottage; below ground level a second wall is detectable, running towards the north for over 23 m at a right angle to the other wall. Building alterations have uncovered "incised slabs" and structural foundations.

== Archaeological finds ==
In 1852 road improvements unearthed outside the door of the cottage called Fail Castle Farm a sandstone sarcophagus of a probable 14th-century date, measuring two feet (60 cm) wide and 18 inches (45 cm) deep, with a section cut out specifically for the head. This was broken in two and bore what may be the royal arms of Scotland and it has been suggested that this was the tomb of Walter Stewart, second son of Robert II and Elizabeth Mure of Rowallan.

A 17th century tombstone bore the coat of arms in an armorial panel of John Cunningham quartered with those of Barbara Hunter who married circa 1660. This lid was taken to Blairquhan Castle, together with a tombstone, residence of the Hunter-Blair owners of the ruins at that time.

A grey sandstone holy water stoop was found in 1950 at a farm near Failford and was moved in 1952 to High Greenan. In 1888 the foundations of a large doorway were found in the centre of the old farmhouse and this was thought to be the main doorway of the old monastery.

In the mid-1960s some "decorated slabs" are recorded as having been found beneath the floor of the cottage on the "Castle" site and three skeletons were uncovered in shallow graves to the east; they were reburied near the site without any further investigation taking place.

== Balinclog and Balinclog Parish ==
A few records exist of a Parish called Balinclog and it has been suggested that the foundation of Fail Monastery led to the lands of Barnweil being granted to the new foundation and the remainder of the old parish lands, Barmuir, being incorporated into those of Tarbolton. The name may derive from the medieval Gaelic baile an cloic for 'farm of the bell' or even from a Gaelicised Old English form such as clokistūn for "bell farm". It is suggested therefore that a bell was once held here, a religious relic. A farm named 'Clockstone' exists and may derive from the older name.

== The Warlock Laird of Fail ==
The last and only layman Laird of Fail, lived at Fail Castle, the new name for the old Minister's dwelling, and was said by the superstitious and somewhat uneducated locals to be a Warlock. Walter Whiteford is likely to have been the name of this despised individual, Educated abroad, Walter spoke foreign languages, and was indeed eccentric in both appearance and behaviour, leading to the many stories that surround his life. He was not a peer or baron and was therefore simply styled "Laird" of Fail.

Paterson records a ballad of this title by the local historian, Joseph Train, published in 1814, in which Sir Thomas Wallace of Craigie is out hunting with the Laird of Fail and the pair come across a house in which the wife is brewing ale. The wife serves Sir Thomas a drink, however she is terrified of the Laird who looks like the Devil and refuses him entry; accusing him of causing her milk cow to die, bewitch her child, her churn to tip over, and her dog to die. The Laird responds by taking a 'pin' and reciting a charm he placed it above the doorway, resulting in a spell that forced the wife to dance and sing uncontrollably. The workers return from the fields and they too are in turn bewitched as they pass under the "pin", until the Laird removes it and is invited to drink by the relieved householders.

One story relates that the laird one day looked out of the upper south window of the castle and saw twenty sets of ploughs at work. He bet a considerable amount of money that he could stop them all in their tracks. At first eighteen of the ploughs stopped, however two carried on without ceasing and the laird lost his bet. It is said that afterwards it was noted that the two ploughs that did not stop had a twig of Rowan or Mountain Ash tree attached, known for protection against the evil eye.

Another story involves a man who was leading an ass laden with crockery. The laird, who had a friend with him, offered for a wager to make the man break all his crockery in pieces. The bet was taken, and immediately the man stopped, unloaded the ass, and seemed to allow all of the stock to fall, smashing into shards. The laird's betting partner asked why he had acted this way and the man replied that he had seen the head of a large black dog growling out of each of the dishes ready to devour him.

Rowan-tree and red thread
Keep the devils frae their speed.

The 'warlock' laird probably died near the close of the 17th century, and on his deathbed he is said to have warned those around present not to stay in the castle after his body was carried out; and he also told them not to bury him until after the harvest was in, because on the day he was laid to rest a disastrous storm would cause widespread damage. The tenants did the best they could, however the body was rapidly decaying and the burial was essential, even though the harvest was only half-finished. The moment the body, on the funeral day, had left Fail Castle, the castle roof collapsed and the wind scattered corn sheaves around like chaff, damage resulting throughout the area.

One version of the story of Maggie Osborne, the supposed Ayr witch, was that Margaret was a daughter of the Laird of Fail who had instructed her in the dark arts. A number of problems arise with this, firstly that her name was Wallace.

== Water mills ==
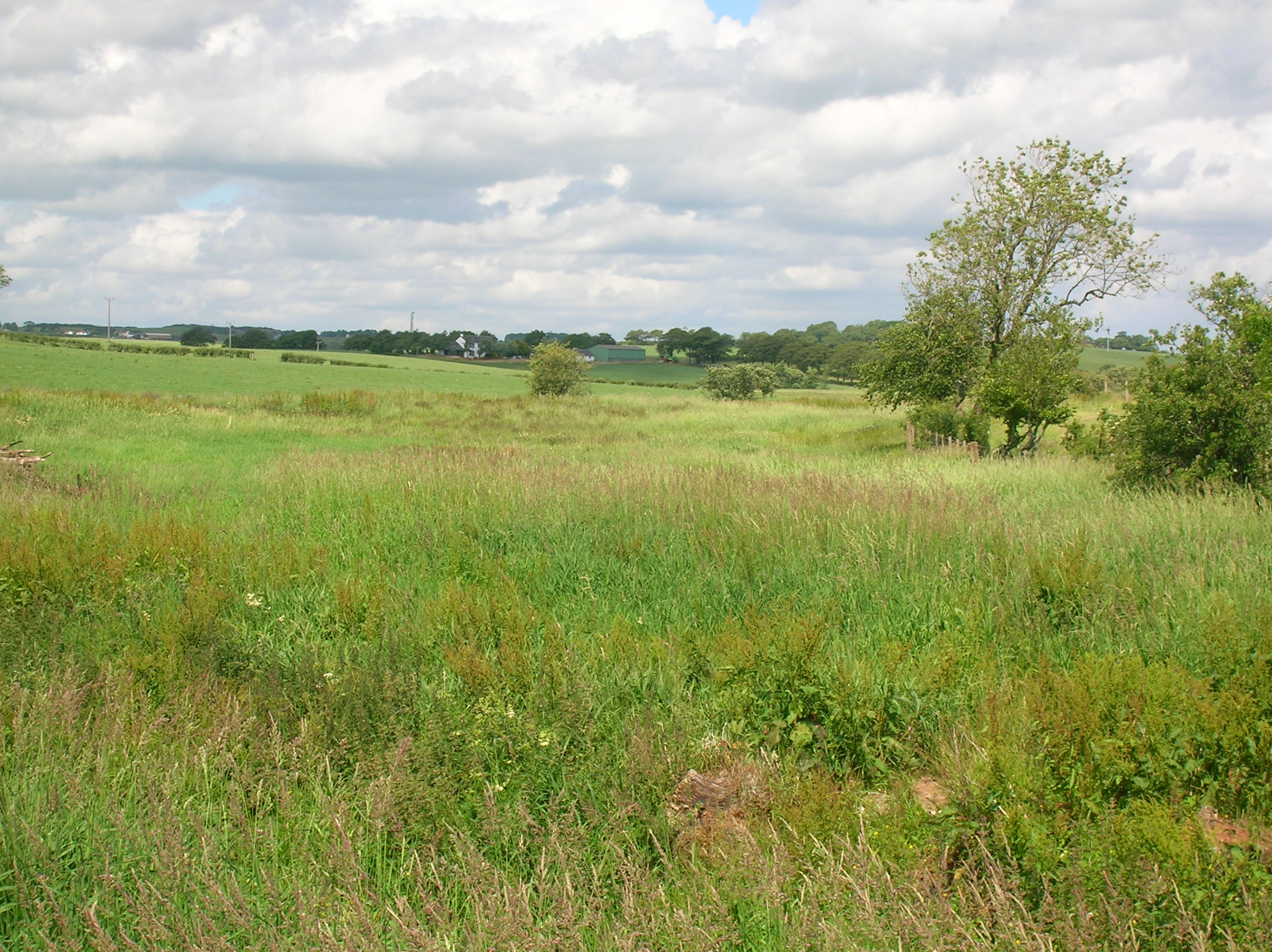
The site of the old Fail Loch

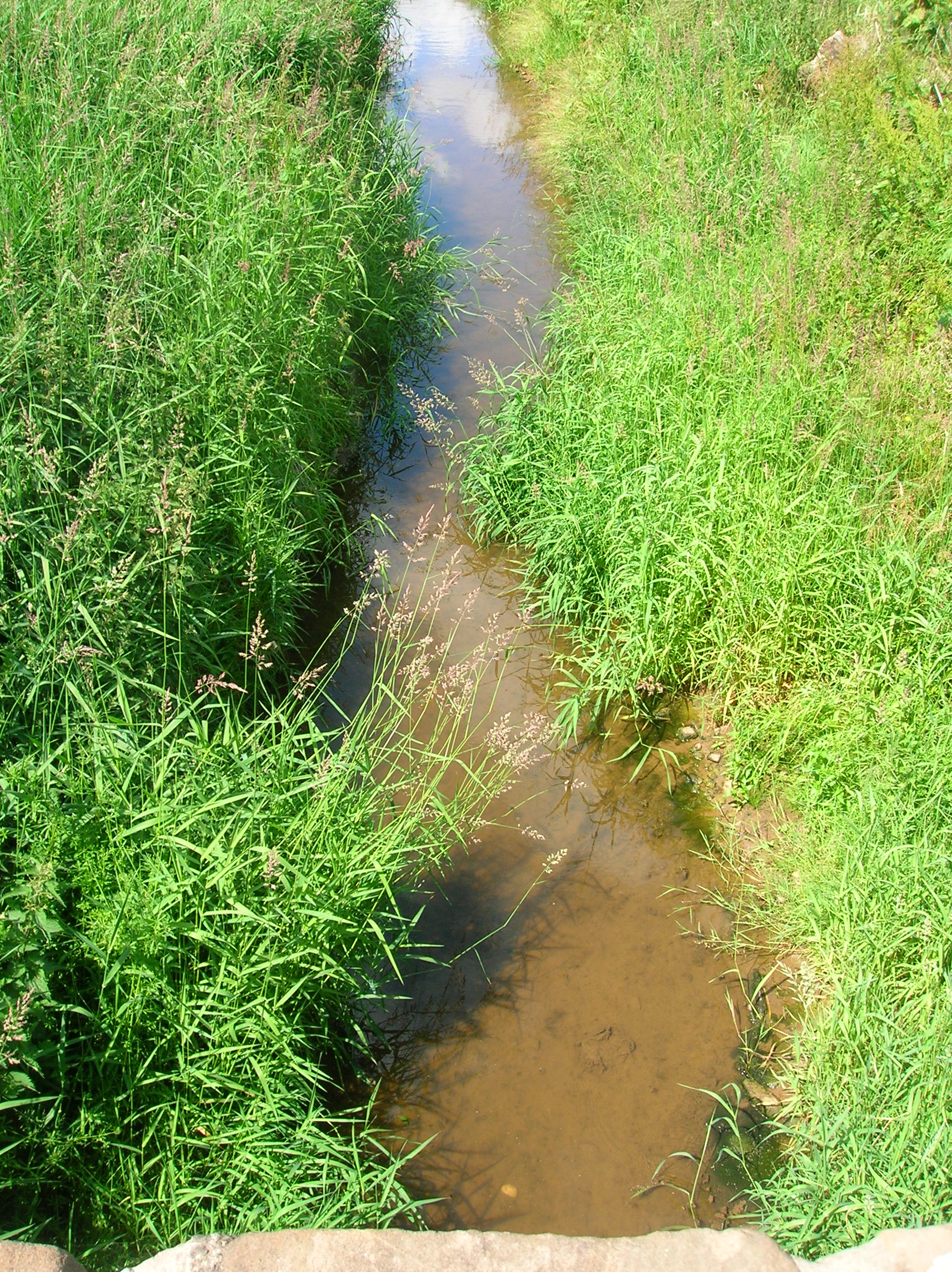
The Water of Fail near Fail Castle Cottage

The Duke of Portland abolished thirlage in the mid-19th century, making Millburn Mill, and Lochlea's head of water, redundant. Fail Mill stood on the rivulet of the Water of Fail nearby and survived into the 20th century. This mill may have originally belonged to the monastery and was powered by the Townend Burn and Fail Loch above it, acting as a millpond and more of an area prone to flooding than a permanent loch.

William Muir was the tenant of the Mill of Fail at the time of Robert Burns's residence at Mossgiel Farm.

== Prehistory of the area ==
In the 1840s three kists were found about 5 ft (1.5 m) under the surface when levelling the ground about 1/4 mi (400 m) north of the monastery (NS 421 286). Some urns were found containing bones. The area of the finds comprises gently undulating cultivated fields under cultivation. In 1840 three cinerary urns were found at Fail Mill and were donated to the Mechanics Museum in Ayr by Mr Andrew of Fail Mill.

A felstone axe, carefully polished and measuring 10 in × 3 in (255 mm × 75 mm) was found near in the 19th century near the monastery (NS 421 286).

== Micro-history ==
The friars of Fail are said to have built Torthorwald Church in the 13th century.

Robert Gaw from Fail Monastery was a reader at Barnweil in 1574.

John Speed's map of 1610 clearly marks Fail Abbey amongst the relatively small number of placenames marked.

Fail Monastery may have been attached to Paisley Abbey.

George Henry Hutton (d. 1827), a soldier and amateur antiquary, visited Fail in October 1800 and produced three drawings of the ruins.

Barnweil church was dedicated to the Holy Rood.

The road from Ayr to Hamilton and Edinburgh passed through Fail as shown on Roy's map of 1747–55.

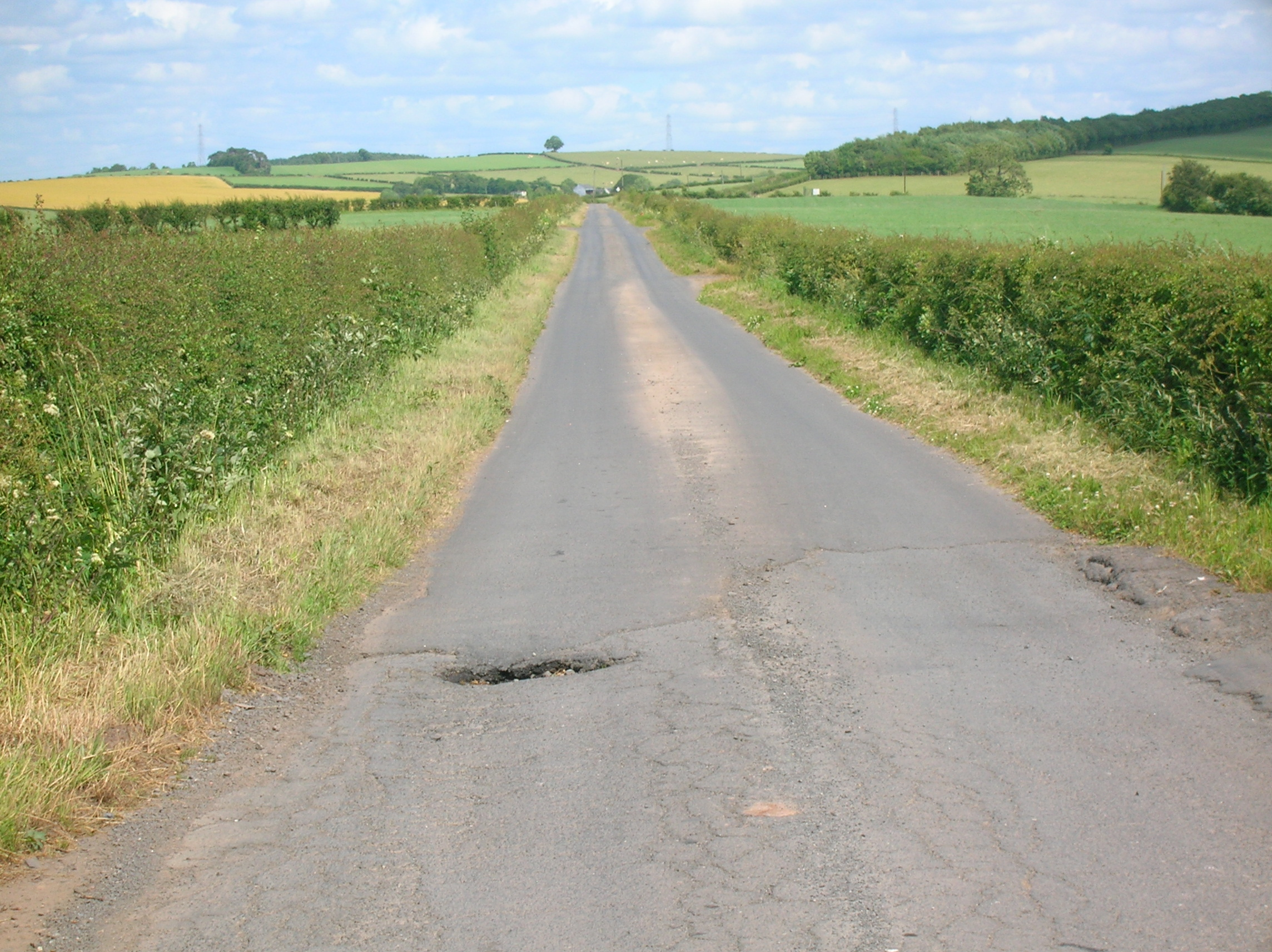
The Monk's road to Mauchline near Redrae Farm

The Fail Well was a spring of fine water located on the roadside.

The name of the nearby Spittalside or Spittleside Farm strongly suggests a connection with a monastic hospital as the friars were obliged to take and help the sick and weary. This was the home of the poet David Sillar, a close friend of Robert Burns.

Melrose Abbey had lands at Mauchline and a Monk's road ran there via Redwrae, Long Wood, Mossbog, Ladyyard and Skeoch.

The old hamlet of Failford takes its name from the lands around the monastery, near the head of the Fail and the old ford stood around 80 yards (75 metres) downstream of the old Failford Bridge nearly in line with the Redrae road.

Ladeside near Crosshands may have been a place of great age for workmen discovered an old coal pit shaft with stone built walls. The depth when the pit was laid open was twelve fathoms (22 m), and the pit bing made a slope in the roadway. The friars of Fail Monastery were reputed to have mined coal more or less on the outskirts of their lands and this could have been one of their ancient workings. It is recorded that in 1497 the friars worked coal near Adamhill Farm.

== See also ==
- Fail Loch
- Lochlea, South Ayrshire
- Loch Brown
- Tarbolton
