= Greenock Water =

River in East Ayrshire, Scotland

Coordinates: 55°31′N 4°10′W

Greenock Water is a river in East Ayrshire, Scotland. It flows out of the Dippal Burn, about 2 miles south of Dungavel Hill. A tributary of the River Ayr, it joins it about 4 miles west of the small town of Muirkirk. It is quite a short river and is not well known.
