= Tarbolton =

Coordinates: 55.5132°N 4.4866°W

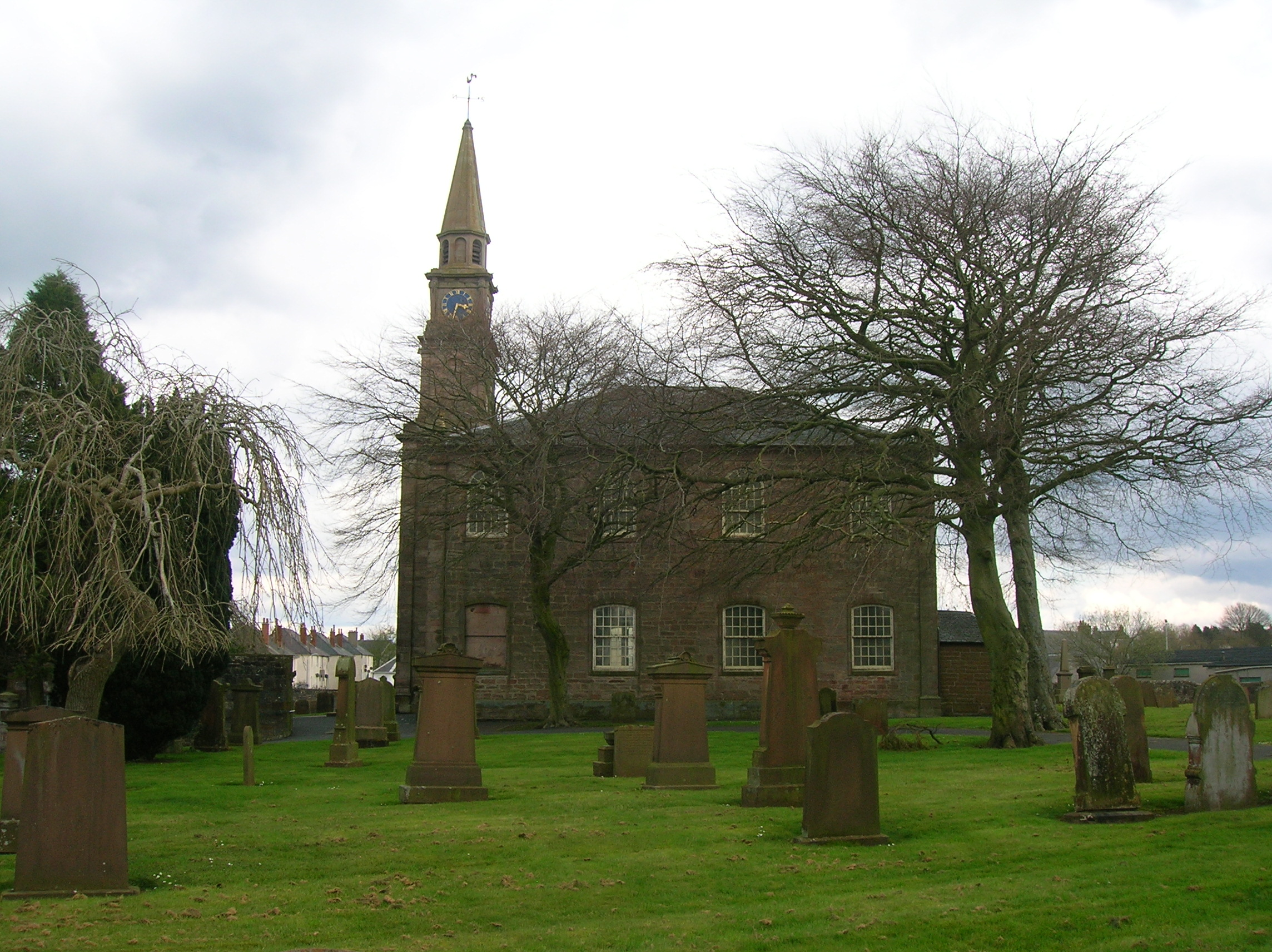
- Tarbolton church.

- Location within South Ayrshire
- Population: 1,860 (2020)
- Civil parish: Tarbolton Community Council
- Council area: South Ayrshire
- Lieutenancy area: Ayrshire and Arran
- Country: Scotland
- Sovereign state: United Kingdom
- Post town: Mauchline
- Postcode district: KA5
- Dialling code: 01292
- Police: Scotland
- Fire: Scottish
- Ambulance: Scottish
- UK Parliament: Central Ayrshire
- Scottish Parliament: Carrick, Cumnock and Doon Valley

Tarbolton (Scots: Tarbowton) is a village in South Ayrshire, Scotland. It is near Failford, Mauchline, Ayr, and Kilmarnock. The old Fail Monastery was nearby and Robert Burns connections are strong, including the Bachelors' Club museum.

== Meaning of place-name ==
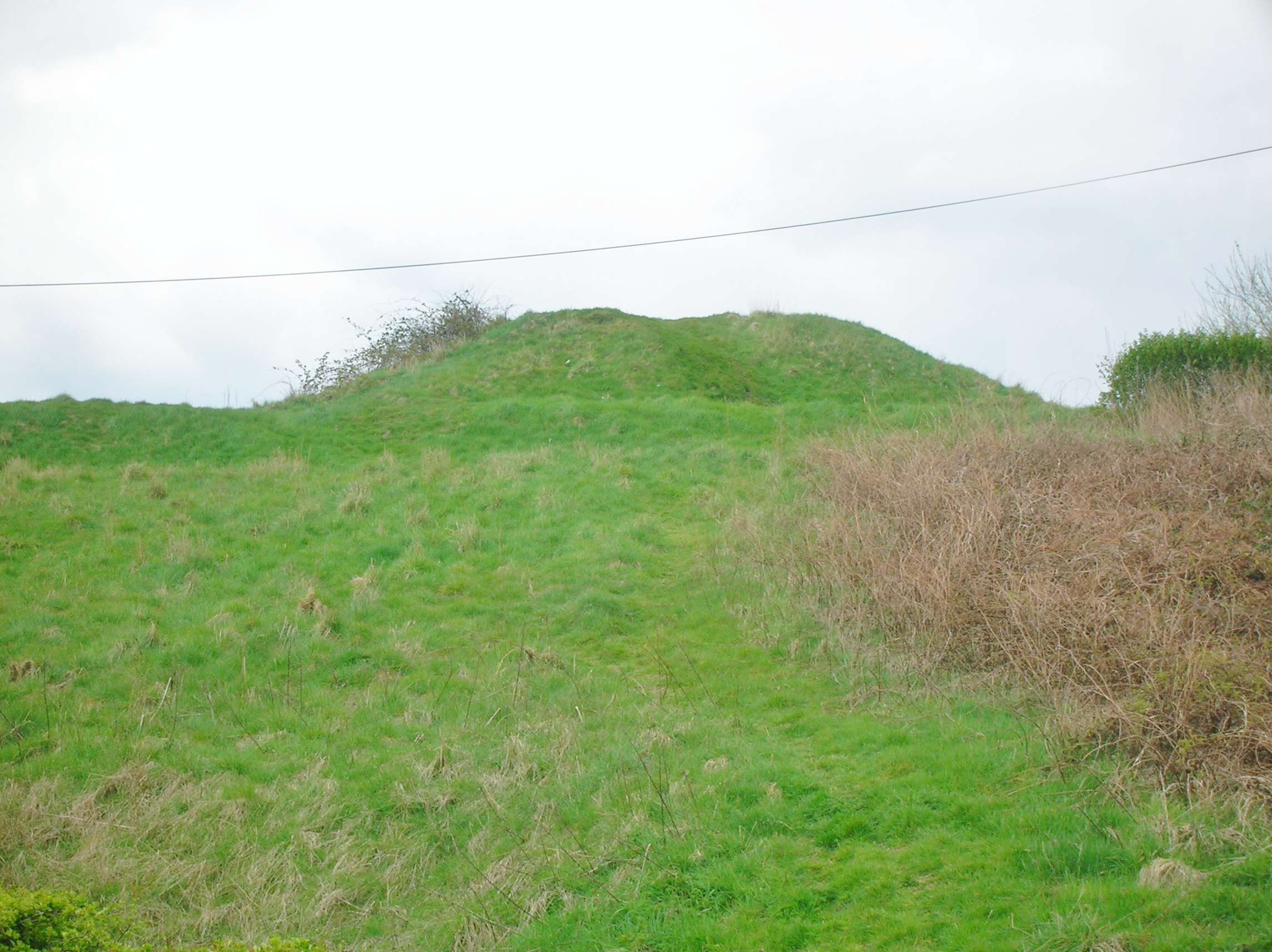
Hood's Hill or Tarbolton Motte.

Tarbolton has been suggested as having one of three meanings:

- Village by the tor or hill, from Old English torr 'tor, hill, cliff' and boðl-tun /bothl-tun "village with buildings, equivalent to Bolton in Greater Manchester. The name was recorded as Torbolten in 1138, suggesting this origin.
- Village by the field and hill, from Old English torr 'tor, hill, cliff' and bāll 'field (not meaning the same as ball 'ball', i.e. football), as in Dunball, Somerset, with tun 'farm, village'. The name's record in writing as Torballtone in 1209 suggests this origin may be possible.
- Village by the hill, from Old Gaelic tor, modern Gaelic tòrr, (where the Old English word is derived from, and baile "village, usually Bally- in Irish place-names, with the tautologous Old English tun "farm, village" added by Anglo-Saxon settlers who did not understand the language. Records of the name as Torbalyrtune in 1148 suggest this origin.

== Location ==
Tarbolton is 7 miles (11 kilometres) east-northeast of Ayr, 7 mi (11 km) southwest of Kilmarnock, 5 mi (8 km) West of Mauchline, and 1 1/4 mi (2 km) from its own now disused railway station. It has a school, church, a gospel hall, two pubs, a bowling club, and is home to the Bachelors' Club, a frequent haunt of Robert Burns. The village is in the Cumnock and Doon Valley.

The monastery and later castle of Fail existed at the hamlet of that name near Fail Toll. Fail Loch once covered a significant area however it survives now only as an area liable to flooding.

Nearby going towards Failford was the Old Montgomery Castle or Coilsfield House where one of Robert Burns's loves worked.

Tarbolton Primary takes pupils from surrounding farms and from Failford, a small hamlet south of the village. The school's houses are Fail, Afton, Coyle and Montgomery, named after local areas and rivers.

== Famous residents ==
- Alexander Tait (1720 – c. 1800), poet and local tailor
- James Allan (1857–1920), footballer and founder of Sunderland A.F.C
- Jimmy Hay (1881–1940), footballer and manager of Celtic F.C.
- Billy Price (1934–2004), footballer
- Kris Boyd (born 1983), footballer
- Evan Armstrong (1943–2017), boxer
- John "Ian" (Mighty Mouse) McLauchlan (1942–2025), rugby union player
- Jai McDowall (born 1986), singer-songwriter and winner of Britain's Got Talent (series 5) 2011
- Tommy Bowman (1873–1958), footballer
- Samuel Campbell (1809–1885), American politician and New York state senator
- George Colville (1876–1928), footballer
- Alex Connell (1930–2009), speed skater
- Tommy Gemmell (1930–2004), footballer
- Sam Goodwin (1943–2005), footballer
- Jimmy Gourlay (1888–1970), footballer
- Jimmy Kirk (1925–2020), footballer
- Willie McCulloch (1927–2013), footballer
- Elizabeth Paton (1760–c. 1799), lover of Robert Burns and mother of his first child
- William Pettigrew (1825–1906), Australian politician and mayor of Brisbane
- John Reid (1800–1867), Presbyterian minister
- George Ritchie (1808–1888), Church of Scotland minister and moderator
- David Sillar (1760–1830), poet and close friend of Robert Burns
- David Tannock (1873–1952), horticulturist
- Robert Thom (1774–1847), civil engineer
- H. J. Whigham (1869–1954), amateur golfer and writer
- Sybil Whigham (1871 – after 1954), golfer
