= Irvine Burns Club =

Association which celebrates Robert Burns and Scottish literature

- Irvine, North Ayrshire, Scotland; UK grid reference NS3203739218
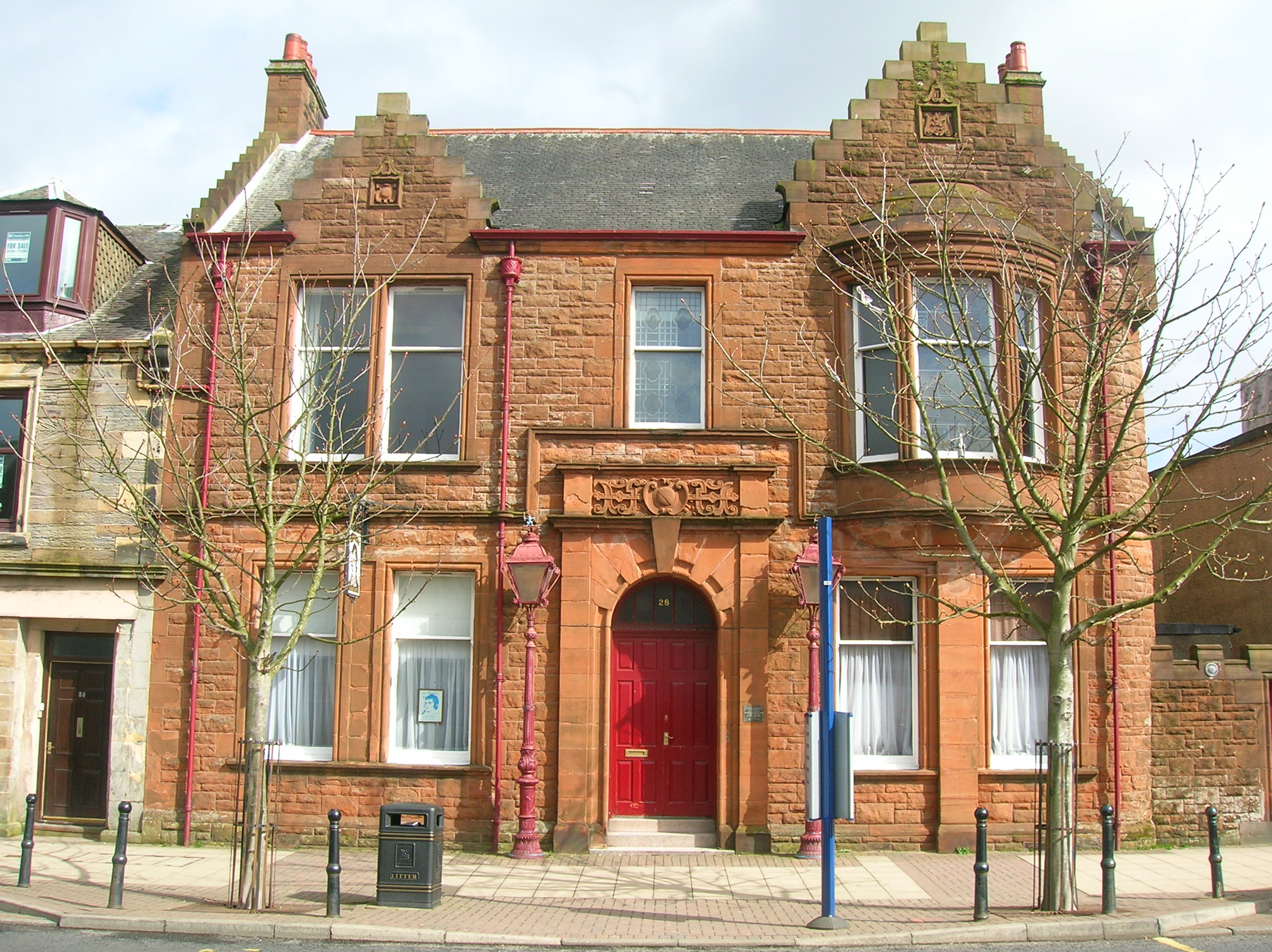
- Wellwood House, Irvine Burns Club

Site information
- Type: Burns Club
- Owner: Irvine Burns Club
- Open to the public: Yes

Location
- Shown within Scotland
- Coordinates: 55.617464°N 4.668645°W
- Grid reference: NS 32037 39218

Site history
- Built: 19th century
- Materials: Stone and brick

The Irvine Burns Club, based at the Wellwood Burns Centre & Museum, was founded on 2 June 1826 and is one of the world's longest continuously active Burns Clubs. At least five personal friends of Robert Burns were among the group of local gentleman, whose idea it was to form the club. Irvine in North Ayrshire is an old market town and port situated on the west coast of Scotland, approx 14 miles north of Ayr.

== History ==
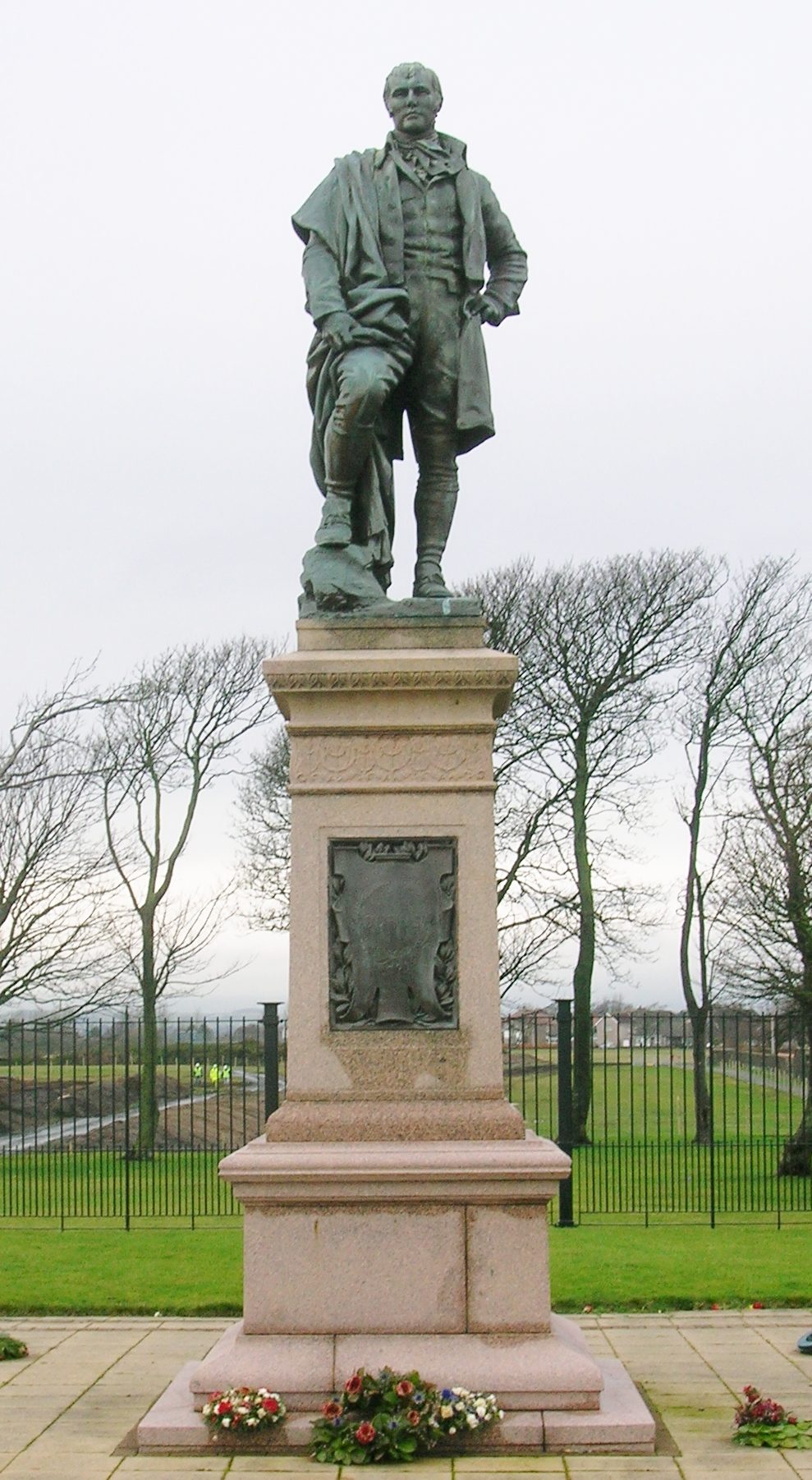
The Robert Burns statue on Irvine Moor.

The Irvine Burns Club, originally formed in the Milne's Inn (now The Crown Inn) is now based in Wellwood House (known simply as 'Wellwood'), Eglinton Street, and has an unbroken history dating back to 2 June 1826. The club had twelve founding members of whom five were known to Robert Burns, and two were once his close friends. The original minute of the meeting reads:

"The subscribers agree hereby to form, and do now form ourselves into a Committee for the purpose of establishing a Club, or Society for Commemorating the birth of Robert Burns the Ayrshire Poet – and we agree to meet at an early day to get the preliminaries of the Club properly arranged."

The document is signed by John Mackenzie, M.D.; David Sillar, Bailie; William Gillies, Grain Dealer; John Peebles, Convener of Trades; James Johnston, Town Clerk; Robert Wyllie, Harbour Master; John Orr, Merchant; James Allan, Merchant (grocer); Maxwell Dick, Bookseller; William Shields, Senior, Merchant; John Fletcher, Surgeon; and Patrick Blair, Writer.

Dr John Mackenzie, was the first club president. He had been a doctor in Mauchline, attended Burns' dying father at Lochlea in 1784 and married one of the "Mauchline Belles" before moving to Irvine in the capacity of personal physician to the Earl of Eglinton and his family. David Sillar, the first Vice-president, had been a friend of Burns since his teenage years, was a member of the Tarbolton Bachelors Club, became a grocer, and finally an Irvine Council Bailie.

In 1925 Provost Hogg arranged for the donation to the club of the councillor's chairs used by John Mackenzie and David Sillar in celebration of the club's centenary.

On 15 August 1844 William Nicol Burns and his brother James Glencairn Burns were entertained in the Kings Arms Hotel, High Street, Irvine by the Irvine Burns Club.

The club meets monthly at its own premises, Wellwood House, and has a structure of a President and Vice-President, other office holders, Directors, and members. The year is centred on events such as the 'Annual Celebration' and the 'Wreath Laying' at the Irvine Moor Burns Statue during January, the Directors' Dinner in March, Founders Day in June, etc.

The club is an active contributor to the community with regular opening times for visitors, Burns competitions, various events, visits by school pupils, musical entertainments, working co-operatively with other Burns clubs, etc.

== Wellwood House ==
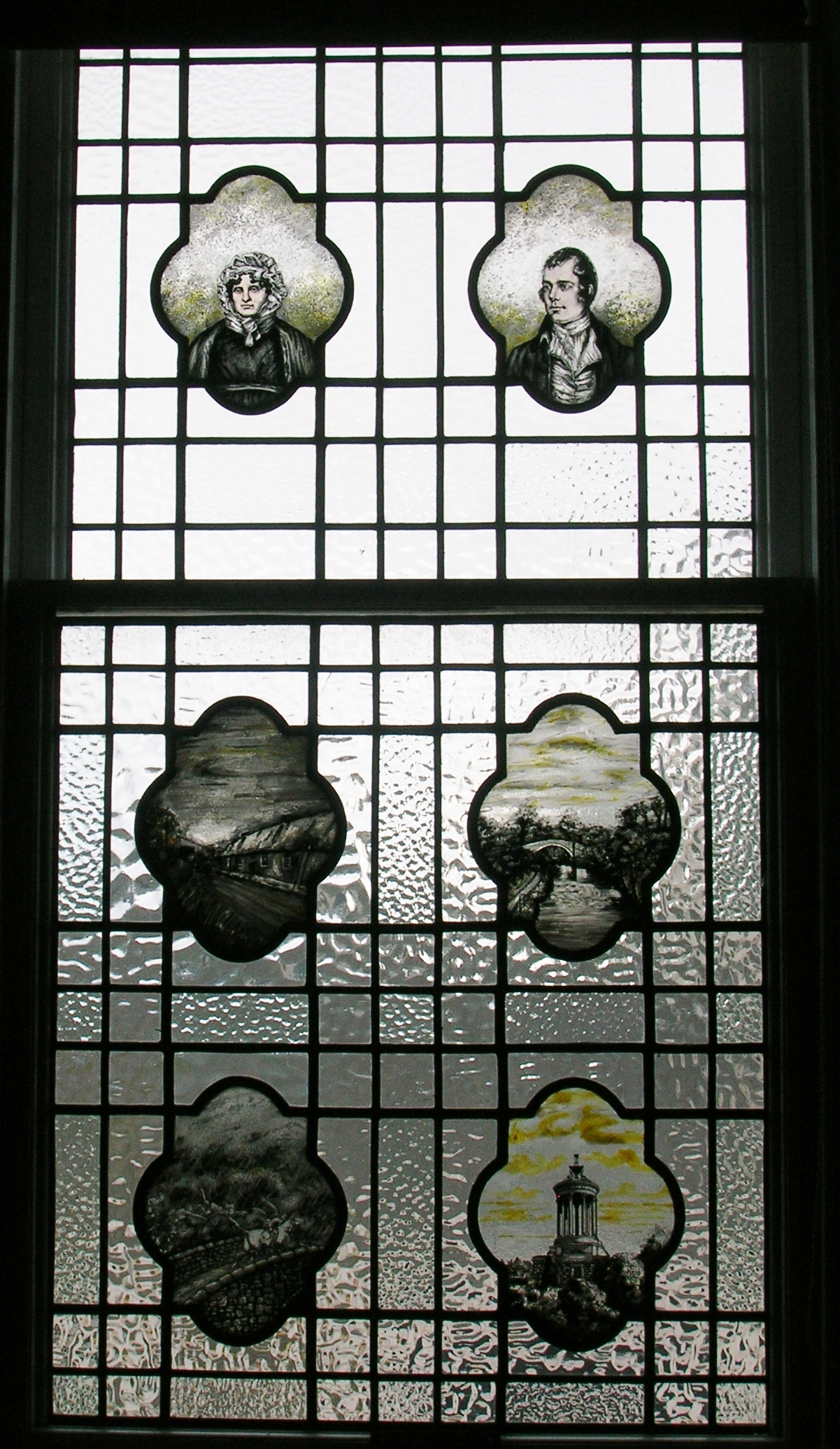
Burns family stained glass window at the Irvine burns Club.

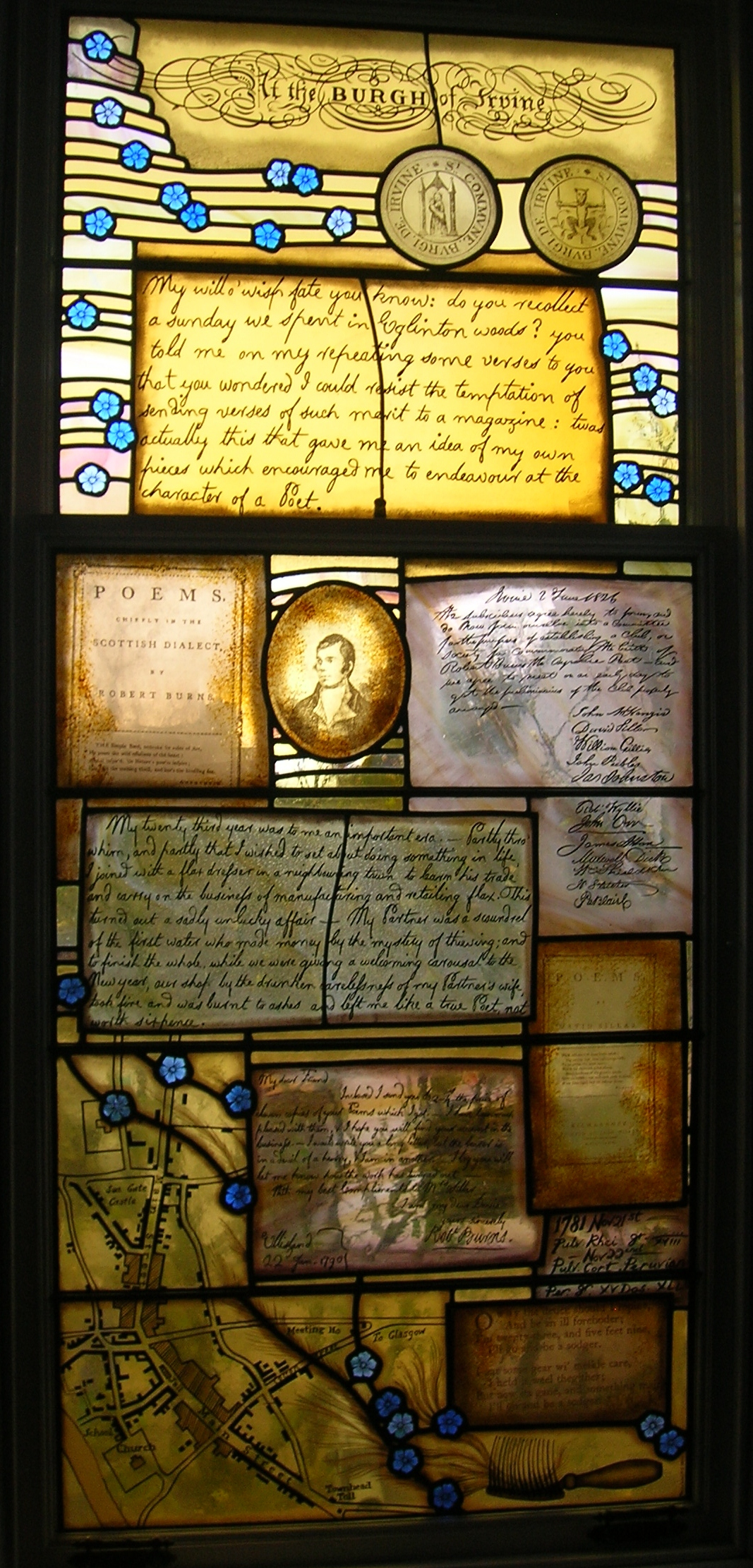
Life of Burns stained glass window at the Irvine Burns Club.

Alexander Paterson had been a partner in Hunter's Bank; after its incorporation into the Union Bank, he and his son John continued as agents with them. Both served on the Irvine council, John from 1854, serving as Provost in 1873–78. John bought the previous house on this site in 1869 and in 1898, after his death, the house passed to his widow, Mrs Catherine Gillies Paterson, who, in 1904, acquired the adjoining property and built the present house. "Wellwood" passed to her daughter Annie, and then in 1934, to Annie's two surviving brothers, J Graham and Robert Paterson, who bequeathed it to Irvine Burns Club in 1955, subject to a life rent in favour of their housekeeper Miss McLean. Irvine Burns Club used the ground floor from 1963, and became the sole occupant in 1976. The building now houses a museum, with a Burns Room bearing unique murals, a large library, and a Concert Room. Wellwood has regular opening hours and free admission.

== Burns artefacts ==
The Irvine Burns Club is one of the oldest continually existing Burns Clubs in the World and has an excellent collection of Burns artefacts, including the Kilmarnock Edition and Edinburgh editions of "Poems chiefly in the Scottish dialect", by Robert Burns.

=== Manuscripts ===
The club has six of the original manuscripts which Burns sent to John Wilson, printer, Kilmarnock, for his famous Kilmarnock Edition, published on 31 July 1786, namely – The Twa Dogs, The Holy Fair, The Author's Earnest Cry and Prayer, The Address to the Deil, Scotch Drink and The Cottar's Saturday Night.

These manuscripts were originally in the possession of Burns' friend Gavin Hamilton, a lawyer in Mauchline and the poet's landlord at Mossgiel Farm. They passed to a relative Hamilton Robinson, originally an apprentice in Hamilton's office, and his widow married Mr Alexander Campbell, the Burgher Kirk Minister (1809–1843) in Irvine. In 1837 Mr Campbell gave the manuscripts to Mr Patrick Blair a founder member of the club, for the Club. These poems are written on 17 folio sheets, seemingly the only surviving manuscripts of the Kilmarnock Edition. They have been inlaid in Dutch handmade paper, and secured between sheets of glass; each of the six volumes are bound in Levant Morocco leather. In 1888 they were selected for the Scottish Literature display at the Glasgow International Exhibition.

=== Sketch ===
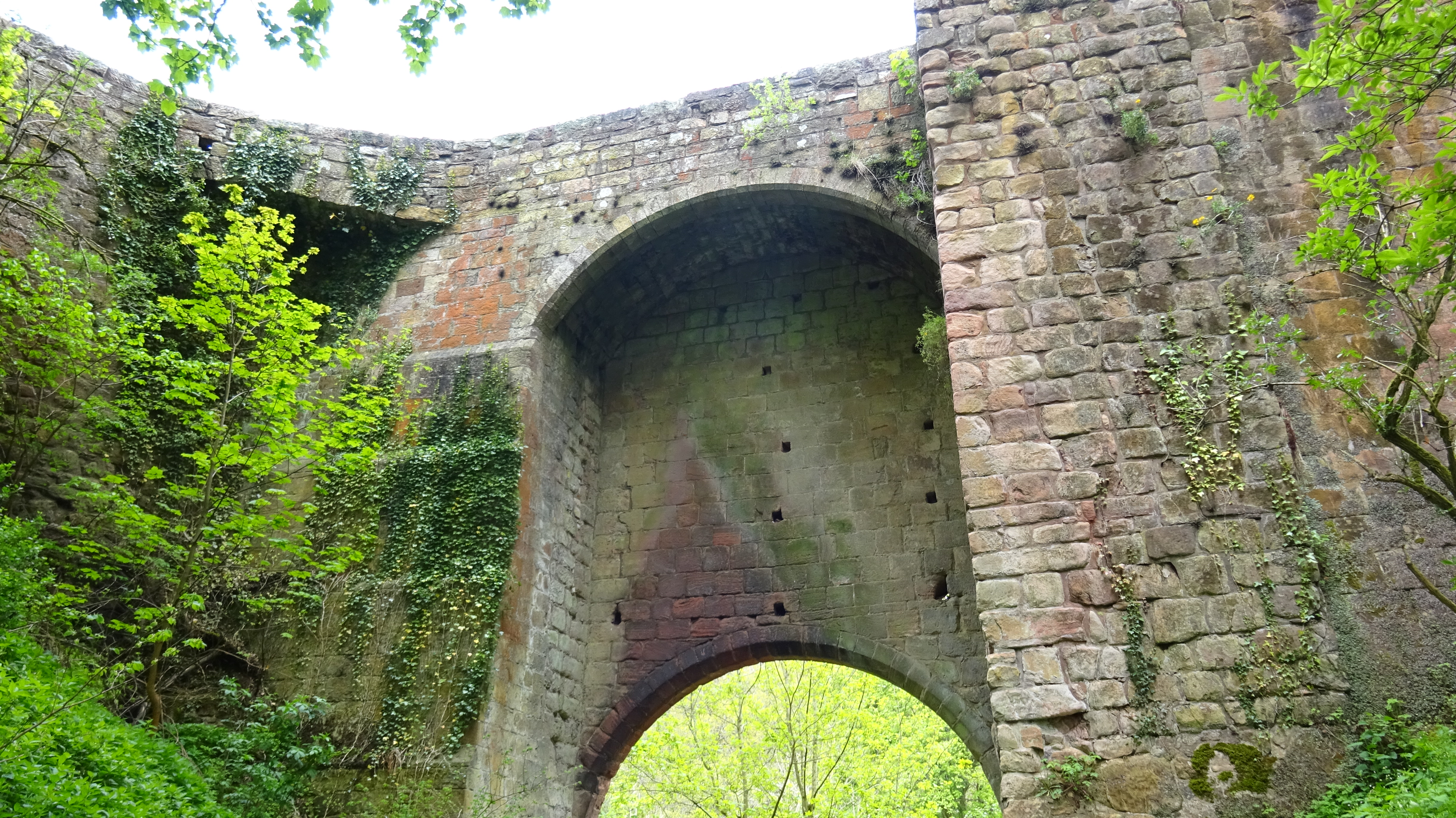
Rosslyn Castle entry bridge. Site of the sketch of Robert Burns by Alexander Nasmyth.

The club owns one of two sketches, the other being in the National Galleries, made of Robert Burns in 1786 by Alexander Nasmyth when he visited Roslin Castle with the poet to enjoy the spectacle of the sunrise. This particular sketch was later used as the inspiration for a small full-length portrait in oils which Robert Chambers commissioned in 1827 and which was then engraved in 1837 for the Life of Burns by Lockhart. Nasmyth is said to have conceived of the pose used during the visit when burns was admiring the castle. Despite the diminutive size, this portrait is credited as the inspiration for many statues of the Robert Burns statues throughout the world.

=== Letters ===
The Club possesses two original letters from Robert Burns to his friend David Sillar, written from Ellisland Farm, Dumfriesshire, dated 5 August 1789, and 22 January 1790. The letters deal with Burns obtaining eleven subscribers for Sillar's own book of poems published in 1789. The club purchased these artefacts in 1975 from the Rev. David Sillar, Wetherby, Yorkshire, a great-great-grandson of Sillar.

=== Dr Fleeming's Day-Book ===
In 1956, 175 years after Burns was in Irvine, this unique artefact was found by Mr Charles Balcombe, a club member, in the attic of 49 Kirkgate, the former home of Dr Charles Fleeming. The entries for November 1781 include details of his treatment of Robert Burns, recorded as a "lint dresser, Irvine", showing that Surgeon Charles Fleeming (Fleming) had visited the Poet on five occasions in a period of eight days. The only surviving letter between Burns and his father relates to this episode and the depressed tone of its contents resulted in his father William travelling from Lochlie Farm, Tarbolton, to visit him.

=== The Templeton Chair ===
In 2016 the chair that Robert Burns used whilst visiting Templeton's bookshop in Irvine was donated to the club by the Gilroy family. Mrs Gilroy's in 1930 stated that Burns' chair was carefully kept by Mrs McGavin (Templeton's daughter) and upon her death in 1881 Templeton's niece took charge of it. In 1909 Templeton's great-niece emigrated to Australia and took the chair with her as a precious family possession, saying that "the chair that Burns always used to sit in and, as Mrs McGavin used to tell my mother, many a good laugh and joke he had in it."

== The Irvine Burns Club library ==
The library at Wellwood House is composed of some 2,000 books donated and purchased over many years, divided into: Burns Works and Criticism; Burnsiana; General Literature and Poetry; Scottish History; Ayrshire History; All the works of John Galt (native of Irvine, 1779–1839); The works of James Montgomery (1771–1854) another native of Irvine who was known as a Christian poet; The works of Edgar Allan Poe, who spent some time at school in Irvine; Records of the local newspaper 'The Irvine Herald' from 1870; The five-volume set "Original Scottish Airs" (songs collected by George Thomson, FAS, Edinburgh) (New Edition 1826), donated to the Museum by Mrs W F Shankland of Kirkcudbright in 1987. The library holds a copy of Robert Burns Begg's (1891) "Memoir of Isobel Burns" that was privately printed for family members only. This rare edition was signed by the author, Robert Burns's nephew, and donated in memory of Sam Gaw, past president of the club and of the Robert Burns World Federation.

== Honorary membership ==
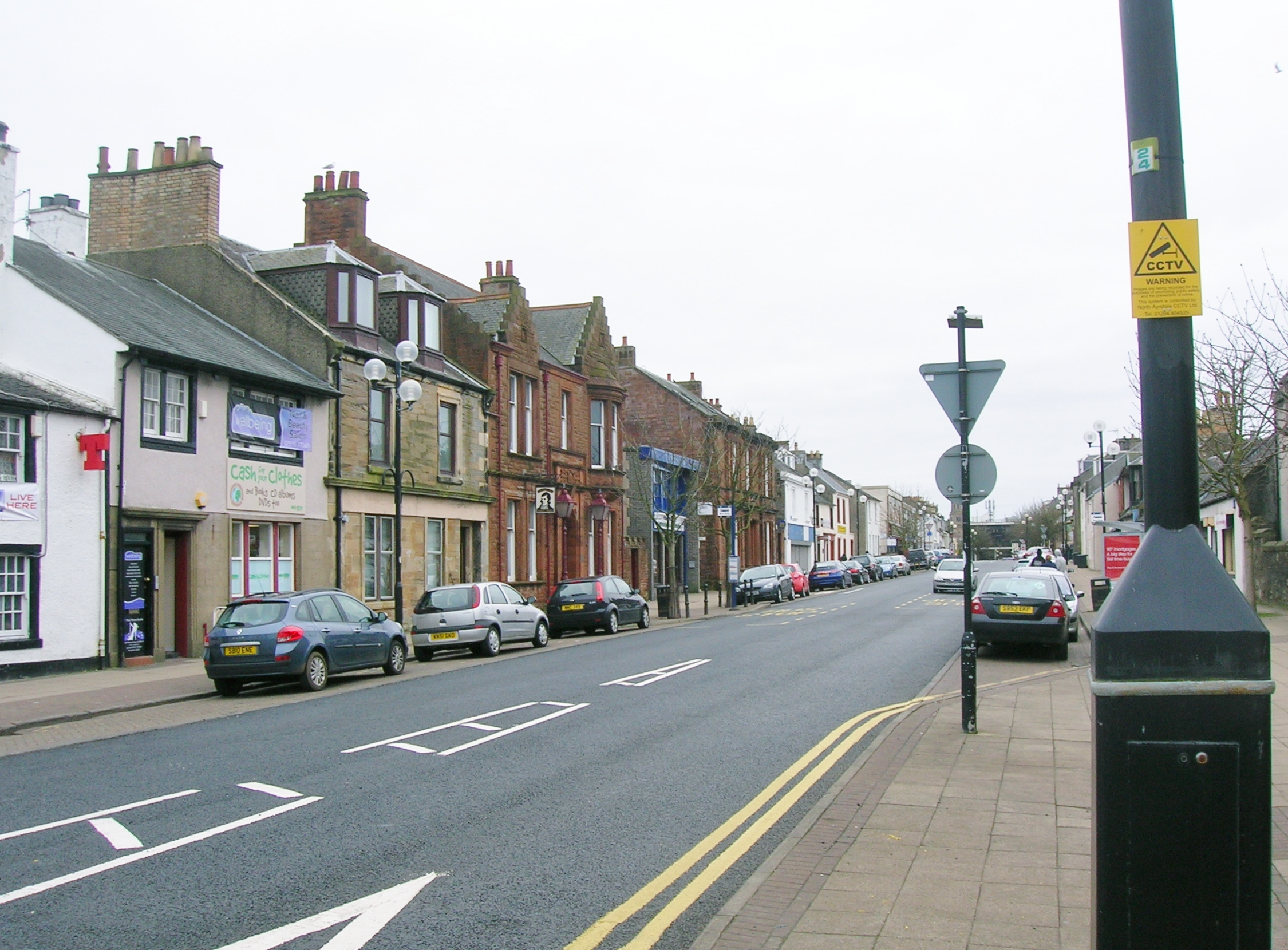
Wellwood House and Eglinton Street.

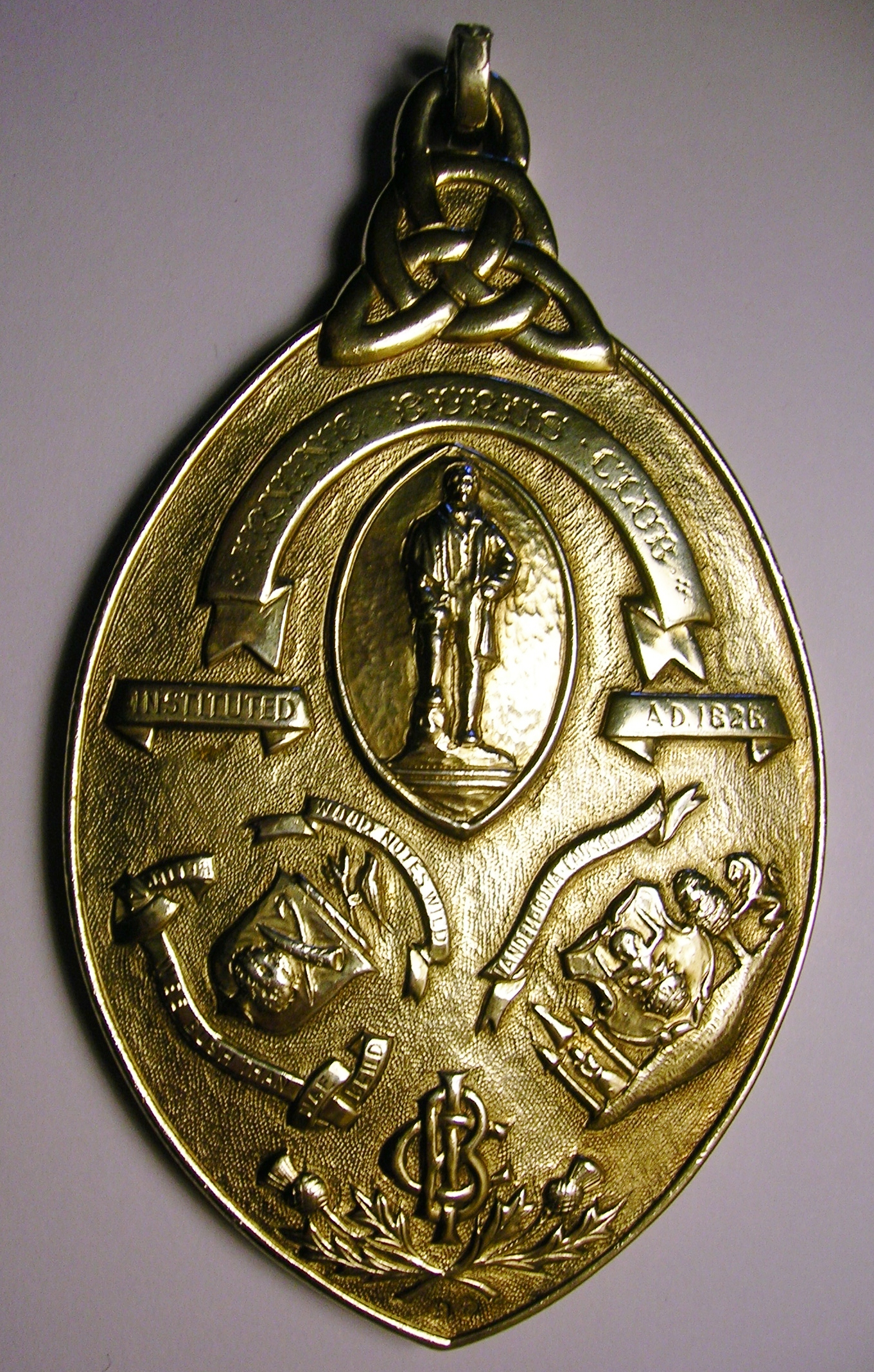
Detail of the President's Chain of Office medallion.

Shortly after the Irvine Burns Club was founded in 1826, it was decided that prominent individuals, national and international, should be recognised by inviting them to become Honorary Members, with a proviso that each should write their letter of acceptance in their own hand. Local man, John Galt – the novelist & Canadian pioneer together with James Montgomery, – the "Christian Poet", to be honorary members. Both accepted the invitation by letter and thus began the tradition. Over the last 174 years over 250 letters have been collected, including James Glencairn Burns, the son of Robert, together with individuals represented in almost every field of human endeavour.

The tradition has continued to the present day, including acceptance letters from Winston Churchill, Margaret Thatcher, sporting legends such as Roger Bannister, Jack Nicklaus, and Bobby Lennox, and many prominent Scots from different walks of life including JM Barrie, Sir Alexander Fleming, Jackie Stewart, Jimmy Shand, Winnie Ewing, each of the Scottish Parliament's four first ministers, and "19th Century literary giants such as Dickens, Tennyson, Browning, Thackeray, Longfellow, and Shaw, political figures from that era include Disraeli, Garibaldi, and Balfour. Burns scholar John DeLancey Ferguson accepted an honorary membership in 1962.

== The Loving Cups ==
A central part of the annual Burns supper involves the ceremonial use of two loving cups, the first of which was presented by Sheffield Citizens in 1869 as a token of esteem and friendship to mark the purchase by the directors of the birthplace of James Montgomery, "The Christian Poet". He was a renowned newspaper editor, hymn writer, poet, journalist and lecturer. The second loving cup was given by David Sillar to his grandson William Cameron Sillar and was presented to the Irvine Burns Club by Mr. F. C. Sillar on 24 January 1964.

== Burns research ==
The Irvine Burns Club encourages, promotes and facilitates research into Robert Burns, his family and topics related to his life, poetry, and songs.

== MacMillan's Publishing ==
Alexander MacMillan (1818–1896) was born in Irvine. He was close to Burns in social class as his father Duncan Macmillan was an Ayrshire smallholder with a few cattle, who also worked as a carter, carrying coal from the pits to Irvine harbour. In 1845 the Macmillan brothers opened a bookshop and publishing firm in Cambridge, before Alexander moved what was by then, after the death of his brother, his publishing firm to London in the 1860s. His library contained an extensive collection of early Burns editions, mostly bound to match his first edition volume of the 'First Edition'.

== Essays on the Life and Times of Robert Burns from the Irvine Burns Club ==
- Poems, Chiefly in the Scottish Dialect (Edinburgh Edition)
- Robert Burns and the Eglinton Estate
- Robert Burns World Federation
- Burns Club Atlanta
- Bachelors' Club, Tarbolton
- Robert Aiken
- Robert Ainslie (lawyer)
- Wilhelmina Alexander
- Adam Armour
- James Armour (Master mason)
- Jean Armour
- Bachelors' Club, Tarbolton
- Lesley Baillie
- Alison Begbie or Elizabeth Gebbie
- Nelly Blair
- Agnes Broun
- Richard Brown (Captain)
- Burns Clubs
- Agnes Burns (sister)
- Elizabeth 'Betty' Burns (daughter)
- Gilbert Burns (Farmer)
- Isabella Burns (sister)
- William Burnes
- May Cameron
- Mary Campbell (Highland Mary)
- Margaret Chalmers (Mrs Lewis Hay)
- Jenny Clow
- Coila (muse)
- Drukken Steps
- Ellisland Farm, Dumfries
- Fog House
- Friar's Carse
- Alexander Findlater
- Jean Gardner
- The Geddes Burns
- Jean Glover
- John Goldie (philosopher)
- Robert Graham of Fintry
- Gavin Hamilton (lawyer)
- The Hermitage (Friars Carse)
- Helen Hyslop
- Irvine Harbour
- Joan Kelly (poet)
- Kate Kemp
- Nelly Kilpatrick
- Jessie Lewars
- John MacKenzie (Doctor)
- Agnes Maclehose
- James McKie (publisher)
- Mary Morison
- John Murdoch (teacher)
- Robert Muir of Loanfoot
- Ann Park
- Elizabeth Paton
- Anne Rankine
- John Richmond (lawyer)
- Poems by David Sillar
- David Sillar
- James Smith (draper)
- Isabella Steven
- John Syme (lawyer)
- Alexander Tait (poet)
- Peggy Thompson
