= Burns Club of Atlanta =

Association which celebrates Robert Burns and Scottish literature

- Burns Cottage
- U.S. National Register of Historic Places
- Location within Georgia
- Location: Atlanta, Georgia
- Coordinates: 33°43′36.9″N 84°21′19.86″W
- Built: 1911
- Architect: Morgan, Thomas H.; McWhirter, Robert M.
- NRHP reference No.: 83003572
- Added to NRHP: December 1, 1983

The Burns Club of Atlanta, officially organized in 1896, is a private social club and literary and cultural society commemorating the works and spirit of the 18th century national poet of Scotland, Robert Burns. In addition to holding monthly meetings, the club has held a Burns supper celebration on the anniversary of Burns' birthday every year since 1898. Club events are held in the Atlanta Burns Cottage, a 1911 replica of poet Robert Burns' birthplace in Alloway, Ayrshire, Scotland. The Cottage has been listed on the National Register of Historic Places as Burns Cottage since 1983.

== History ==
The Burns Club of Atlanta is fifty-third in seniority among several hundred organizations recognized by the Scottish-based World Burns Federation. Officially organized on January 25, 1896, the centennial year of Robert Burns’ birth, the Burns Club of Atlanta is quite possibly the city's oldest surviving cultural and literary society. As early as the 1870s, Burns admirers in Atlanta had been meeting in private homes and hotels to celebrate the birthday of the Scottish poet. Shortly after the club's formation, plans were made to construct for a clubhouse an exact replica of Robert Burns' birthplace in Alloway, Ayrshire, Scotland. Situated in the East Atlanta neighborhood of Ormewood Park, construction for the Atlanta Burns Cottage was completed in 1911.

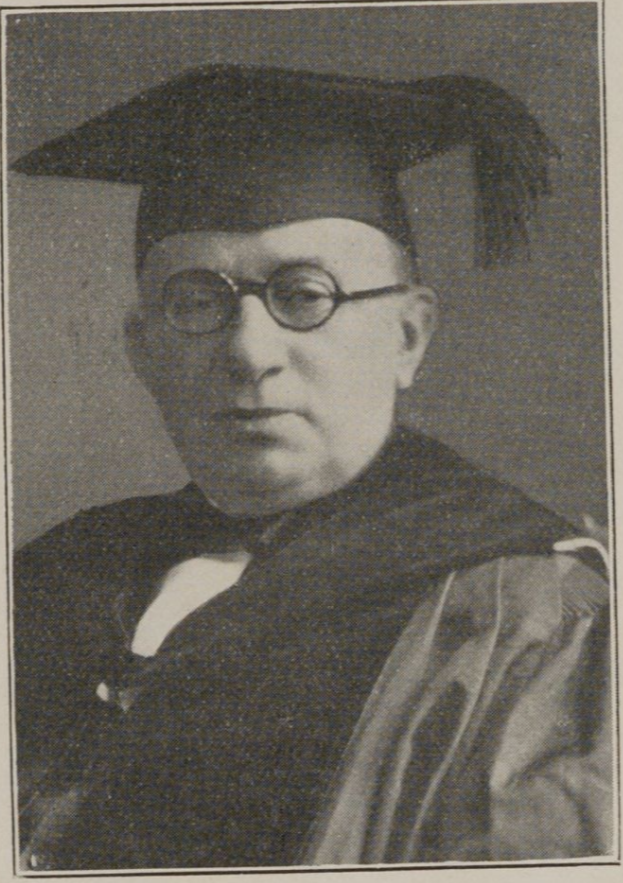
Joseph Jacobs, c. 1924

The moving spirit behind the club's founding was Joseph Jacobs, the Atlanta pharmacist and drugstore owner at whose suggestion Coca-Cola was first carbonated. He served the very first Coca-Cola beverage from his fountain in the Five Points neighborhood of Atlanta. Of German Jewish parentage, Dr. Jacobs illustrates the universal appeal of Robert Burns’ poetry.

== A tradition of socially diverse membership ==
Since its organization, the club's membership has included governors, college presidents, farmers, teachers, clergymen, engineers, lawyers, doctors, artists, salesmen and tradesmen. Membership is limited by space in the cottage to 100 members. Following club tradition, membership is only open to males. However, non-member male and female guests are frequent and many and are welcome by invitation.

== Literature and fellowship ==
Monthly meetings in the Atlanta Burns Cottage feature readings from Burns’ works and various lectures given by visiting scholars, authorities and members. Previous lecturers include Atlanta author Margaret Mitchell and Scottish entertainer and goodwill ambassador, Sir Henry Lauder. Monthly meetings are noted for relaxed companionship and spirited, yet informal, discussion. Every meeting concludes with the traditional Scottish farewell observance of “circling up” and singing “Auld Lang Syne.”

== The Atlanta Burns Cottage ==
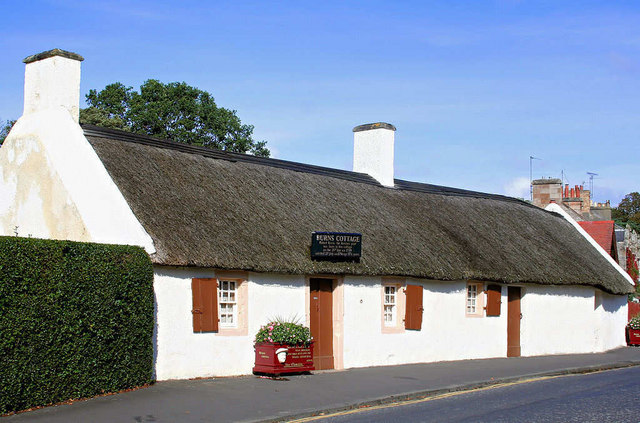
Burns Cottage, built by William Burnes at Alloway, Scotland.

The Burns Club of Atlanta retains the honor of having as their clubhouse the only reproduction in the world of Robert Burns' birth home.

After the turn of the 20th century, the club began an effort to obtain land and erect a cottage to be used as a clubhouse. In 1907, the club purchased 15 acres (61,000 m^{2}) in what is now the Ormewood Park neighborhood of Atlanta, at the end of the trolley line on “Dogwood Hill” across from the Confederate Veterans Home on Confederate Avenue (now the site of the Georgia Highway Patrol headquarters).

Atlanta architect and member, Thomas H. Morgan, obtained the exact measurements of the original Burns cottage in Alloway, Scotland, and prepared plans for the Atlanta replica. Construction of the building was supervised by Robert McWhirter, a member of the club and a skilled stonemason, and was finished in 1911 using quarried granite from nearby Stone Mountain instead of the traditional mortar and rubble construction found in Burns’ birth home.

The originally thatched, but now-shingled, roof has shallow eaves and gables that connect directly to the chimneys. The three fireplaces in the cottage are constructed of random stones with mortar joints raised and rounded. The fireplace in the center of the cottage features an inset stone plaque in memory of Burns. Of the three doors on the front of the cottage, only one is used. The cottage's uncommonly small windows reflect one particular Scottish practice of taxation in which homeowners were taxed according to the dimensions of their home's window openings. The low, one-story building is generally rectangular, but is slightly curved, as was the original, which accommodated the curve of the road it was built along. The interior of the house is also a close replica of the Scottish cottage, and was divided into the traditional three areas: butt, ben and byre.

The cottage was managed by a caretaker who lives on the grounds.

== Scottish vernacular architecture: butt, ben and byre ==
One now enters the Atlanta Burns Cottage through the byre, the Scots word for the portion of the cottage where, in Burn's original birthplace, animals and farm stuff were housed. Members of the club now use this room for their monthly meetings. While the club is primarily a literary society, many of the members share Burns’ Scottish heritage and display their clan tartan banners, along with several plaques and bas-relief panels situated on plastered walls.

To the immediate left is the ben, the innermost room of the family dwelling. Originally, there was no door between the living quarters and the byre. The ben represents the combined living room and dormitory for the large Burns family. In the Atlanta Burns Cottage it functions as additional space for club events.

To the far left is found the butt, or the outer room used as kitchen, dining room and parent's bedroom. The fireplace/stove, cabinet, and plate rack found within this room faithfully portray the original cottage furnishings. The room also features a box-bed that recreates the bed in which Robert Burns was born. The room is now used as an office and space for directors’ meetings. Almost a century of Atlanta Burns Club presidents’ portraits hang on the walls.

== Other architectural additions and alterations ==
The only remaining outbuilding was a one-story stone caretaker's house, originally a log cabin. It was redesigned in 1969 to bear a closer resemblance to the cottage. Due to disrepair, the caretaker's cottage was demolished in 2024. The grounds once included a dance pavilion, barbecue pit, a tennis court and putting green for club use. Changes to Burns Cottage include the rear additions of a kitchen, interior porch, restrooms and an external wooden platform used for social events. Other alterations include the replacement of stone-flagged floors with finished concrete, an additional fireplace in the byre and the sealing up of several small windows.

== See also ==
- Robert Burns World Federation
- Bachelors' Club, Tarbolton
- Irvine Burns Club
- List of American gentlemen's clubs
- Poems, Chiefly in the Scottish Dialect
- Poems, Chiefly in the Scottish Dialect (Edinburgh Edition)
