= Joan Kelly (poet) =

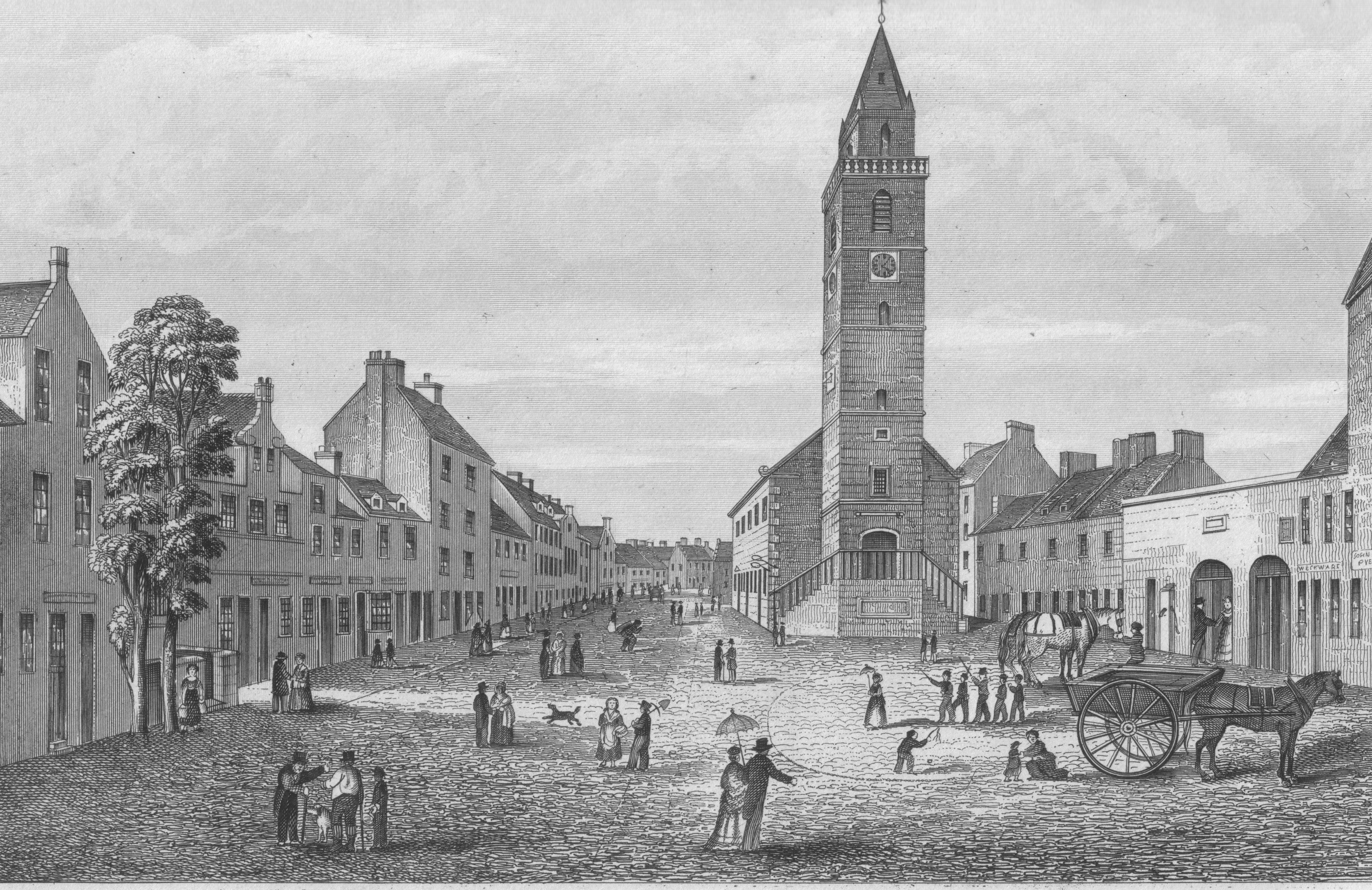
- The High Street in the 19th century
- Born: 1828; Irvine
- Died: 4 October 1898; Irvine, North Ayrshire
- Occupations: Poet and hand sewer

Joan Kelly (1828–1898) was a Scottish poet and hand-sewer who published her "Miscellaneous Poems" on 1 January 1884 in the hope of raising sufficient funds to be able to leave the Cunninghame Combination Poorhouse.

== Life and character ==
Kelly was born in Irvine and never married, living with her widowed mother Mary Allan in Bridgegate and later in the High Street. It is not known when or how her father died, although one of her poems implies that it was at sea whilst her mother was pregnant. She was employed as a muslin hand-sewer. Kelly took an active interest in local and world events, writing poetry on these themes. Her mother, Mary Allan (born circa 1786), died in 1870 aged 84. Her father was John Kelly (born circa 1785), a sailor from the Isle of Man where the couple had been married at Onchan or in Manx, Kione Droghad near Douglas Doolish (Manx) on 16 May 1816. Kelly's grandparents on her mother's side of the family were Robert Allan and Grace Sharp.

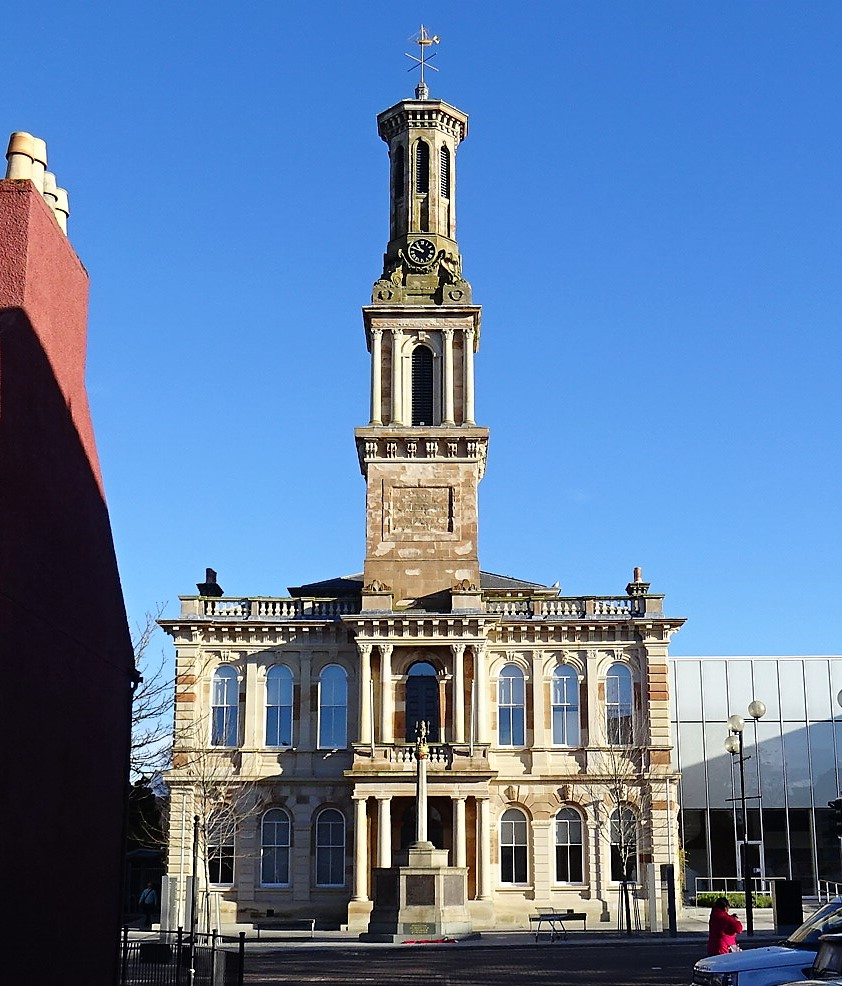
The Irvine Town House.

Kelly died on 4 October 1898 of 'senile debility' aged 70 in the Cunninghame Combination Poorhouse, an establishment to which she had been admitted and discharged on several occasions after her mother's death in 1870. She spent much her later life in the local 'poorhouse' due to being blind or partially sighted.

Some confusion exists as to her date and place of birth, since her obituary in "The Glasgow Herald" (note: The Herald until 1992), on 10 October 1898 states that she was a native of the Isle of Man, and that she died aged about 80 years of age, whilst her death certificate states 70 years of age.

In 1881 she was listed in the census as a pauper, aged 58 and living at the poorhouse. Her age is in conflict with that given on her death certificate. A handwritten 53 may have been read as 58.

In 1895 the Irvine Parish Role of Paupers gives her age as 76 which is in conflict with her death certificate and records that she had entered the poorhouse in 1870 as a result of 'Impaired Vision' after her mother had died.

Kelly died a pauper and as she appears to have had no relatives she would have been buried in the cemetery at the workhouse, however James Dickie, Club Secretary and Town Clerk, as well as the other directors of the Irvine Burns Club recognised her talents as a poet and organised and paid for her burial at the Irvine churchyard, preceded by a procession of the club members, magistrates, the Incorporated Trades, council officials and members of the public. The Irvine Burns Club laid a laurel wreath on her grave.

Irvine has a 'Joan Kelly Place' within a housing scheme, named after the poet.

=== Poetry ===
As stated, Kelly took an active interest in local and world events and her poetry was created around these themes. She included a poem about Robert Burns in her book. Her poetry often appeared in local papers.

In 1884 she published her poems in an octavo (17.5 x 1.5 cm) volume with the title "Miscellaneous Poems". It was published in hardback blue boards with calico covering and embossed gold lettering by Charles Murchland "Irvine Herald Office" in Irvine. Charles was President of Irvine Burns Club in 1879 and Provost of Irvine (1898-1904). She comments in the introduction to her book that "Had it not been for the kindness of my publisher, who consented to take the responsibility of launching my frail bark upon the rough sea of criticism ... " She received a letter of thanks from the Empress Eugene thanking her for the poem she wrote upon the death of her son in Africa.

A copy is recorded to be in the Queen's Sitting Room at Osborne House

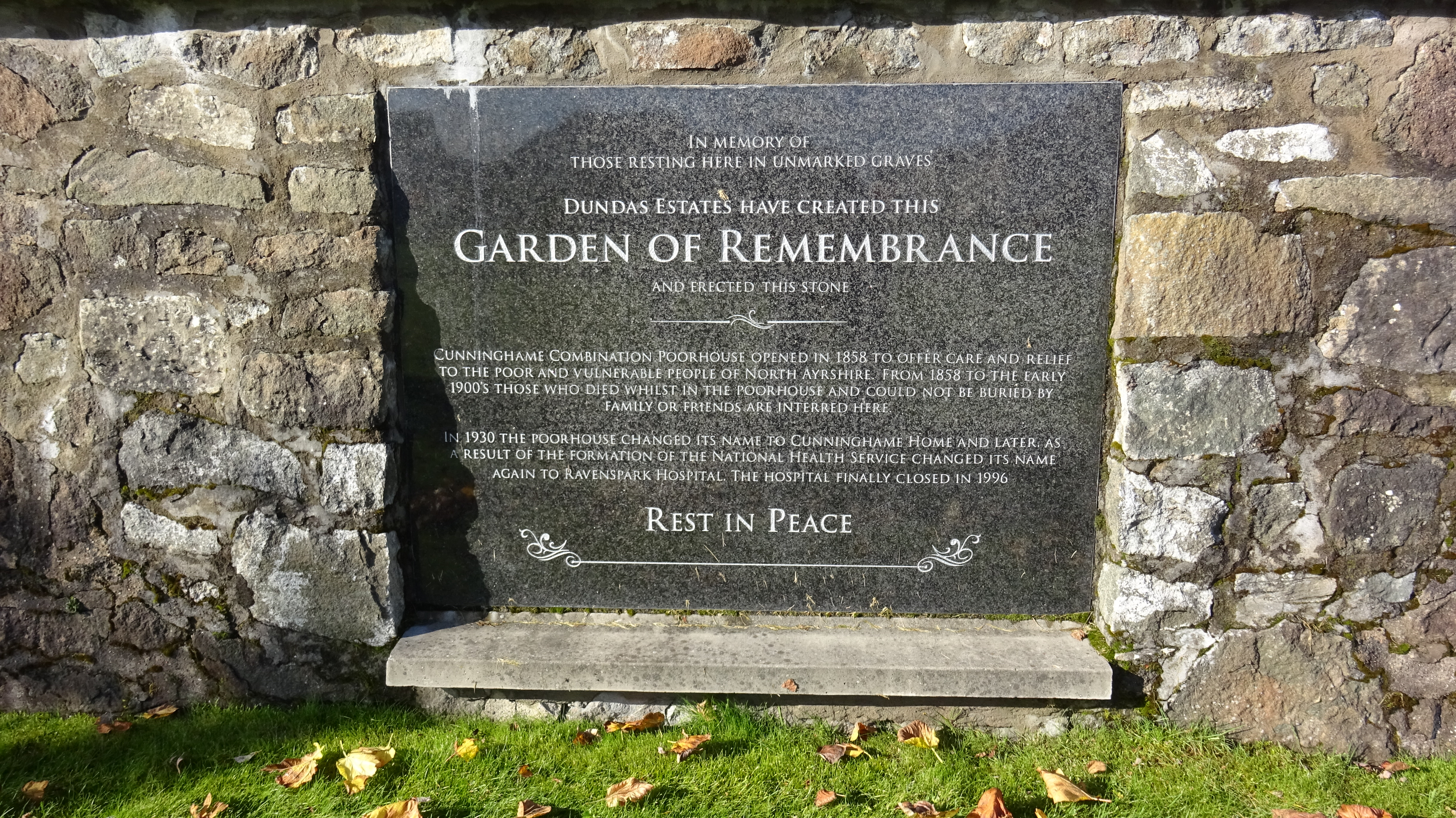
Cunninghame Combination Poorhouse Remembrance Garden.

The publication, "The poets of Ayrshire from the fourteenth century till the present day, with selections from their writings" includes her work and gives the following details:

"This authoress adds another to the long list of lowly minstrels belonging to Ayrshire. She was born in Irvine, and lived
there with her widowed mother until the latter was eighty-four
years of age, when the ruthless breaker of love's more than
mortal ties divided them, and the brightest star of poor Joan's
life was extinguished forever.

Left friendless and in a manner helpless, the parish authorities
found it necessary to remove her to their Combination Palace near
her native town, but she longed to breathe what she called " the sweet,
pure air of liberty," and took unkindly to her new home. With the view
of raising funds for her self-support, a small volume of her
poems was published, but the proceeds did little more than
cover publishing expenses, and the hope maintained by the
poetess that she might by these means regain her independence
was forever blasted."

The following is an example of this Victorian poet's work composed for John Yuille who died in 1883 aged 75 and published in her 1884 book. Yuille had been a hand loom weaver who became a printer, stationer and bookseller. He was buried in the Irvine Old Parish Churchyard. His role as a friend and a publisher and printer may have influenced Kelly's decision to publish her poems shortly after Yuille's death.

In Memory of Mr. John Yuille

Aged pilgrim, all is over,
Thou hast laid earth's weapons down;
Long thou wore the Master's armour,
Now, I trust, thou'st gained the crown.

Many years thou sojourned with us,
Those who knew thee loved thee best;
No display, but ever ready
Aiding those with sorrow pressed.

Kind and genial in thy manner,
Even from thy early youth;
Shunning all that led to evil,
Known for rectitude and truth.

But on earth no more we'll see thee --
No more see thy placid face;
But in memory long thou'lt linger,
Long be marked thy vacant place.

Kelly's poem upon the death of the wife of the Irvine area's laird;

In Memory of the Late Countess of Eglinton and Winton.

I've seen the beauteous king of day
In splendid glory rise,
Chasing the darker clouds away
And dazzling eager eyes.

All felt his pure enlivening beams;
The wealthy and the poor;
The monarch in his gilded halls;
The peasant at his door.

And as I gazed with upturned eye,
I've marked the threat'ning cloud
Come sweeping on with sudden force,
And wrap him in its shroud.

== A partial list of the poems in Kelly's 1884 publication Miscellaneous Poems ==
1. Lines on the Death of Miss H. Green
2. Lines Upon the Sad Catastrophe on the Clyde
3. In Memory of John McGavin, Esq, Kilwinning
4. In Memory of the Misses R & C Wales
5. On the Death of the Prince, Imperial
6. Upon Receiving a Letter of Thanks From the Empress Eugenie
7. To Tame a Robin
8. On the Marriage of Princess Louise and the Marquis of Lorne
9. Upon the Death of Prince Albert
10. Child and Mother - A Dialogue
11. The Seven Sailors

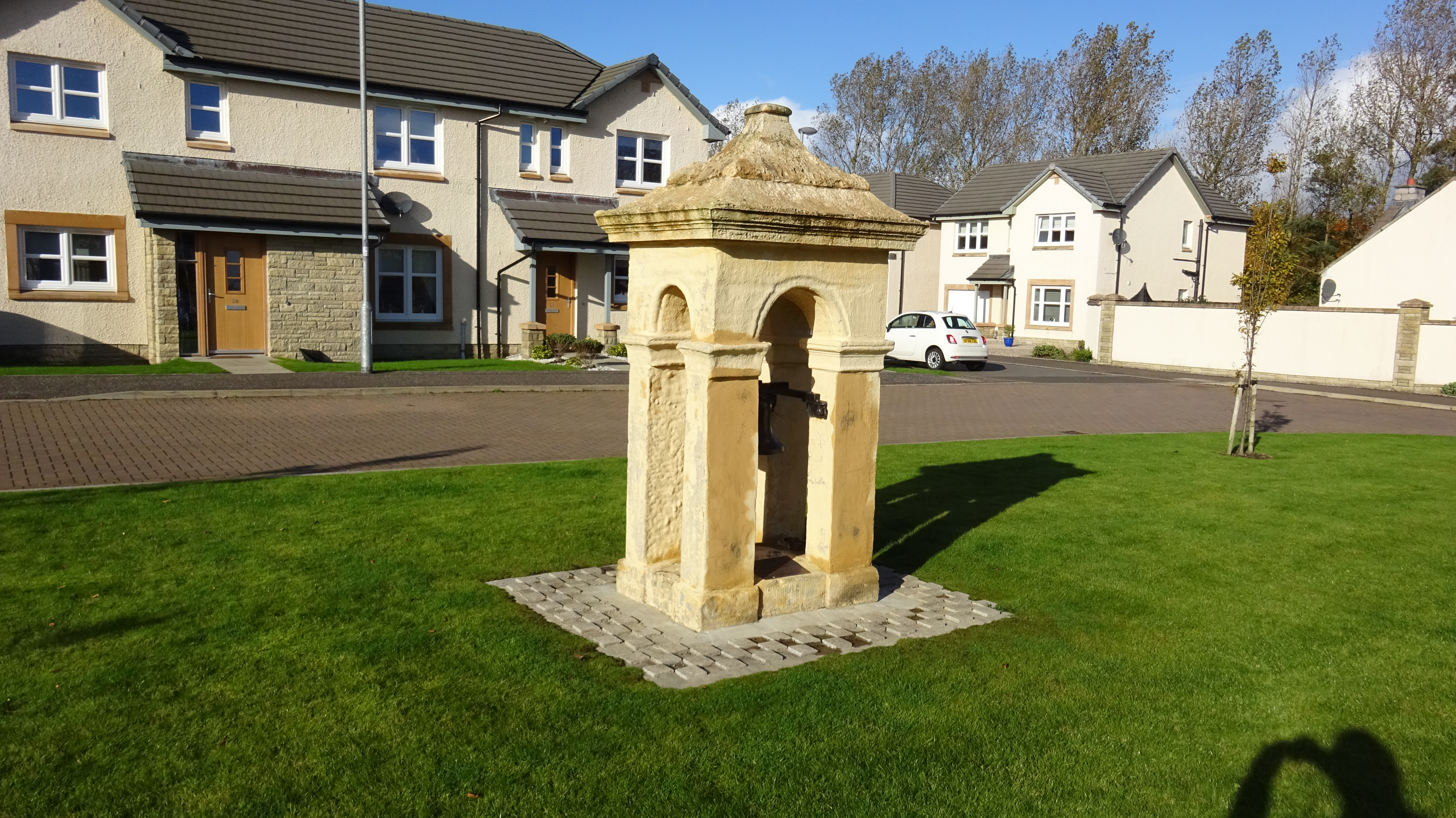
Bell and belfry from the main tower at the poorhouse.

1. Friendship
2. The Poisoned Flower
3. To a False Friend
4. A Husband to His Wife, Before Leaving For America
5. Fifty Years of Married Life; or the Golden Wedding
6. Lines Upon Miss Longmuir's Marriage
7. A Christmas Wish to a Lady
8. Upon Looking at the Photograph of the Rev James Sommerville Irvine Parish Church
9. A Sketch of the Writer's Life
10. Lines on the Mournful Catastrophe in Sunderland
11. Upon Burns' Birthday, 25 January 1867
