= Bachelors' Club, Tarbolton =

17th-century Scottish building which housed early cultural and social groups

Bachelors' Club
- Tarbolton, South Ayrshire, Scotland; UK grid reference NS4311327184
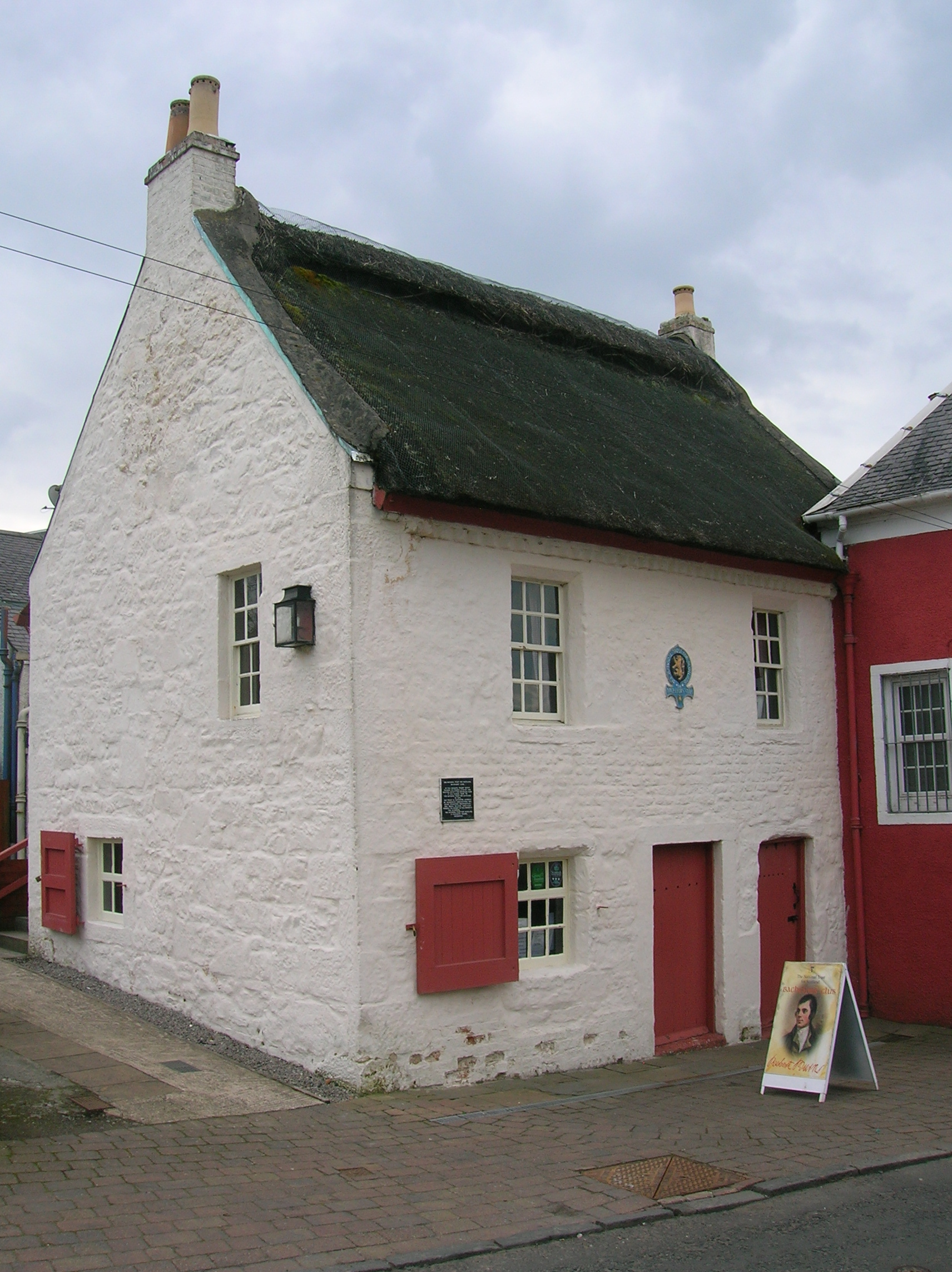
- Bachelors' Club

Site information
- Type: Private Club
- Owner: National Trust for Scotland
- Open to the public: Yes
- Condition: Restored

Location
- Shown within Scotland
- Coordinates: 55.513156°N 4.486145°W

Site history
- Built: 18th century
- Materials: Stone and brick

The Bachelors' Club is a National Trust for Scotland museum located at 1 Sandgate Street, Tarbolton, KA5 5RB. The upstairs room was the largest in Tarbolton and was used for a number of social events. It was probably the first rural debating society in Scotland and the prototype for many Burns Clubs the world over. This 17th-century building is thatched and has period furnishings.

== History ==
On 11 November 1780 a debating club was founded by young men from Tarbolton parish, inspired by one that was established in Ayr, by Robert Burns, Gilbert Burns, Hugh Reid, Alexander Brown, Thomas Wright, William M'Gavin and Walter Mitchell. Robert Burns was unanimously elected president for the first meeting, held in the property of John Richard, used as an ale-house. David Sillar, who lived nearby, was added to the list of founders in May 1781, followed by Matthew Paterson, James Paterson, and John Orr in 1782. The Club continued in operation for some years after Burns left the district.

Views inside the upper room of the Bachelors' Club

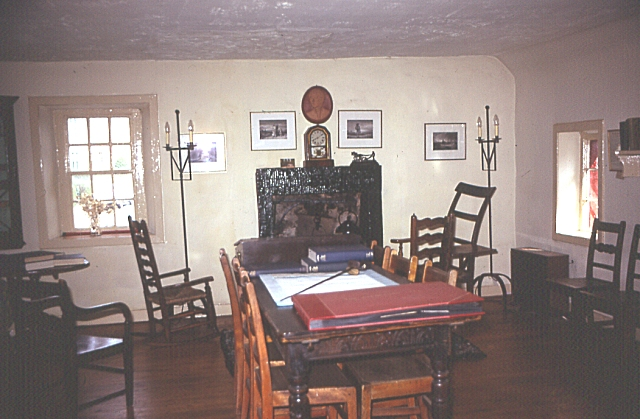

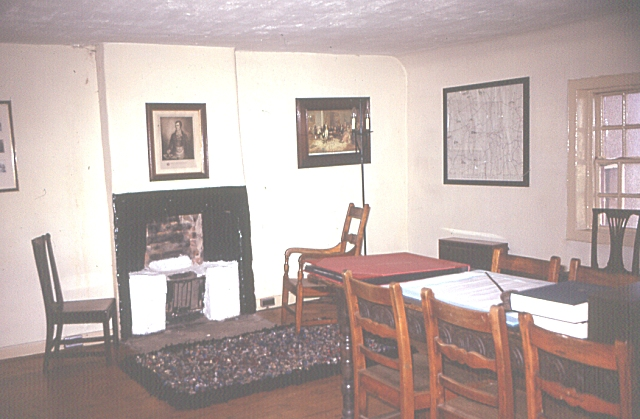

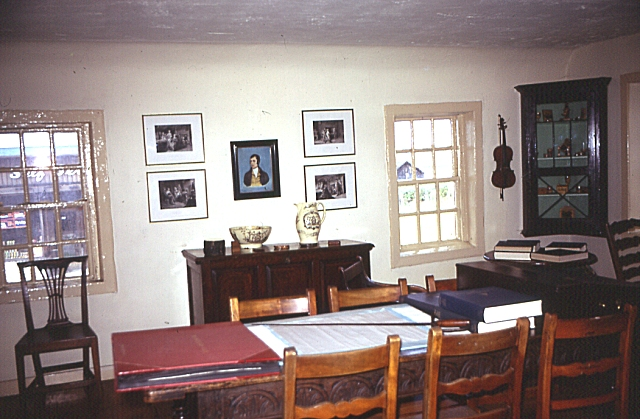

Robert Burns also attended dancing lessons here in 1779, much to his father's annoyance as the poet later recorded: "In my seventeenth year, to give my manners a brush, I went to a country dancing school. My father had an unaccountable antipathy against these meetings; and my going was, what to this hour I repent, in absolute defiance of his commands. My father, as I said before, was the sport of strong passions; from that instance of rebellion he took a kind of dislike to me..." Burns was initiated into Freemasonry here in 1781.

A number of rules were drawn up, probably mainly composed by Burns, but the manuscript is not in his handwriting. The tenth reads: "Every man proper for a member of this Society, must have a frank, honest, open heart; above anything dirty or mean; and must be a professed lover of one or more of the female sex. No haughty, self-conceited person, who looks upon himself as superior to the rest of the club, and especially no mean spirited, worldly mortal, whose only will is to heap up money shall upon any pretence whatever be admitted." The subjects for debate included: "Whether do we derive more happiness from Love or Friendship?"; "Whether is the savage man or the peasant of a civilised country in the most happy situation?"; "Suppose a young man, bred a farmer, but without any future, had it in his power to marry either of two women, the one a girl of large fortune, but neither handsome in person or agreeable in conversation but who can manage the household affairs of a farm well enough; the other of them a girl every way agreeable in person, conversation and behaviour, but without any fortune, which of them shall he choose?". Robert Burns debated on behalf the lass without the fortune. A toast to the mistresses of the club was the final act of each meeting. These mistresses were the mothers of each household.

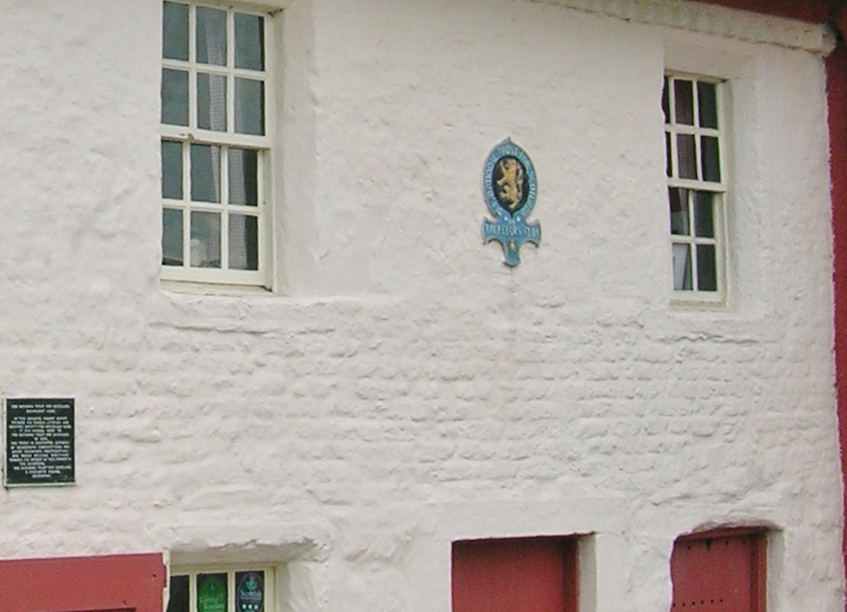
Detail of the front of the club, including a Fire Mark.

The house was occupied by a number of families until 1928, it then lay empty and in 1937 faced demolition by Ayr County Council, however the Burns Federation and the National Trust managed to delay this precipitous act, World War II followed and in 1951 the property was acquired for the nation. It was renovated and re-thatched in 1971 by the National Trust for Scotland. In 2024-25 it went under further repairs including re-thatching.

=== Nocturnal ===
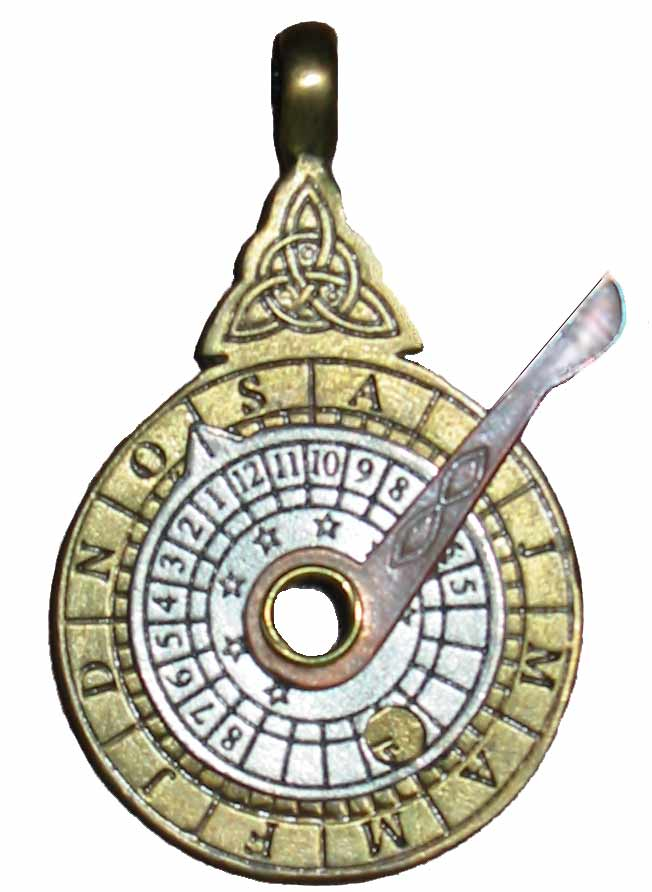
A brass and silver nocturnal

A rare item of great interest held by the Bachelors' Club is a wooden instrument known as a 'Nocturnal', which means 'night time'. This artifact is related to a Moondial and allows you to tell the time at night using a combination of the Pole star and one other star. You set the instrument to the right time of year, then look for the Pole Star through the hole in the middle. Adjust the index arm to align with one of the 'pointer stars', which seem to point to the Pole Star. Where the arm meets the hour scale, you read off the time. The provenance of this nocturnal is not recorded.

== See also ==
- Robert Burns World Federation
- Irvine Burns Club
- Burns Club Atlanta
