= Alexander Findlater =

Friend and colleague of poet Robert Burns

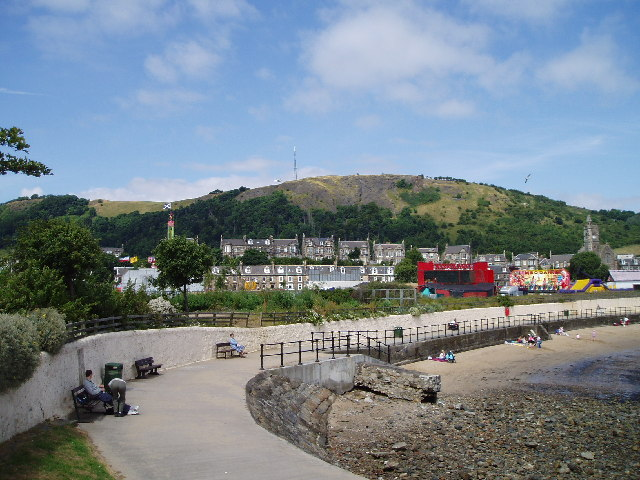
- Burtisland, Findlater's birthplace
- Born: 4 September 1754; Burntisland
- Died: 3 December 1839; Anderston and then Linn Cemetery
- Occupation: Collector of Excise

Alexander Findlater was a friend and colleague of Robert Burns and also his immediate superior, as Supervisor, in the Excise service. He knew the poet very well and was a great advocate for Burns after his death and in response to biographies by authors such as Robert Heron, Allan Cunningham and James Currie.

== Life and character ==
Findlater was born at Burntisland in Fife in 1754. His father was James Findlater, an army officer who became an Excise officer. His mother was Helen Ballantyne, daughter of Ronald and Janet Ballantyne. Alexander had five brothers and four sisters. The Revd Alexander Findlater of Hamilton was his grandfather. On 30 April 1778 he married Susan Forrester of Falkirk. Susan (b.1749) died in 1810 and was buried in Greyfriars Kirkyard, Edinburgh. Susan's mother was a Napier of Craigannet and was descended from John Napier of Merchiston, the inventor of logarithms. Findlater had three further children through his marriage with Catherine Anderson. Alexander may have had a total of five daughters and six brothers.

In 1774 he became an Excise officer and by 1778 he was working in Coupar Angus. June 1790 saw Findlater as an Examiner of Excise and by April 1791 he had achieved the position of Supervisor of Excise with the formal swearing in on 27 October 1791 and he and his family were based in Dumfries, arriving around six months before Burns moved into the town. Findlater was promoted to general Supervisor in Edinburgh in 1797 and to Collector in Glasgow in 1811, succeeding William Corbet.

Findlater retired in 1825, aged 71 after 11 years in post as Collector. He lived at North Wellington Place in Glasgow and died in 1839. His first burial place was in the Anderston's North Street Burial ground with a memorial erected by the Sandyford Burns Club. His grave was moved to the south side of Glasgow's Linn Cemetery in the 1960s following redevelopment of the Anderston area.

== Association with Robert Burns ==
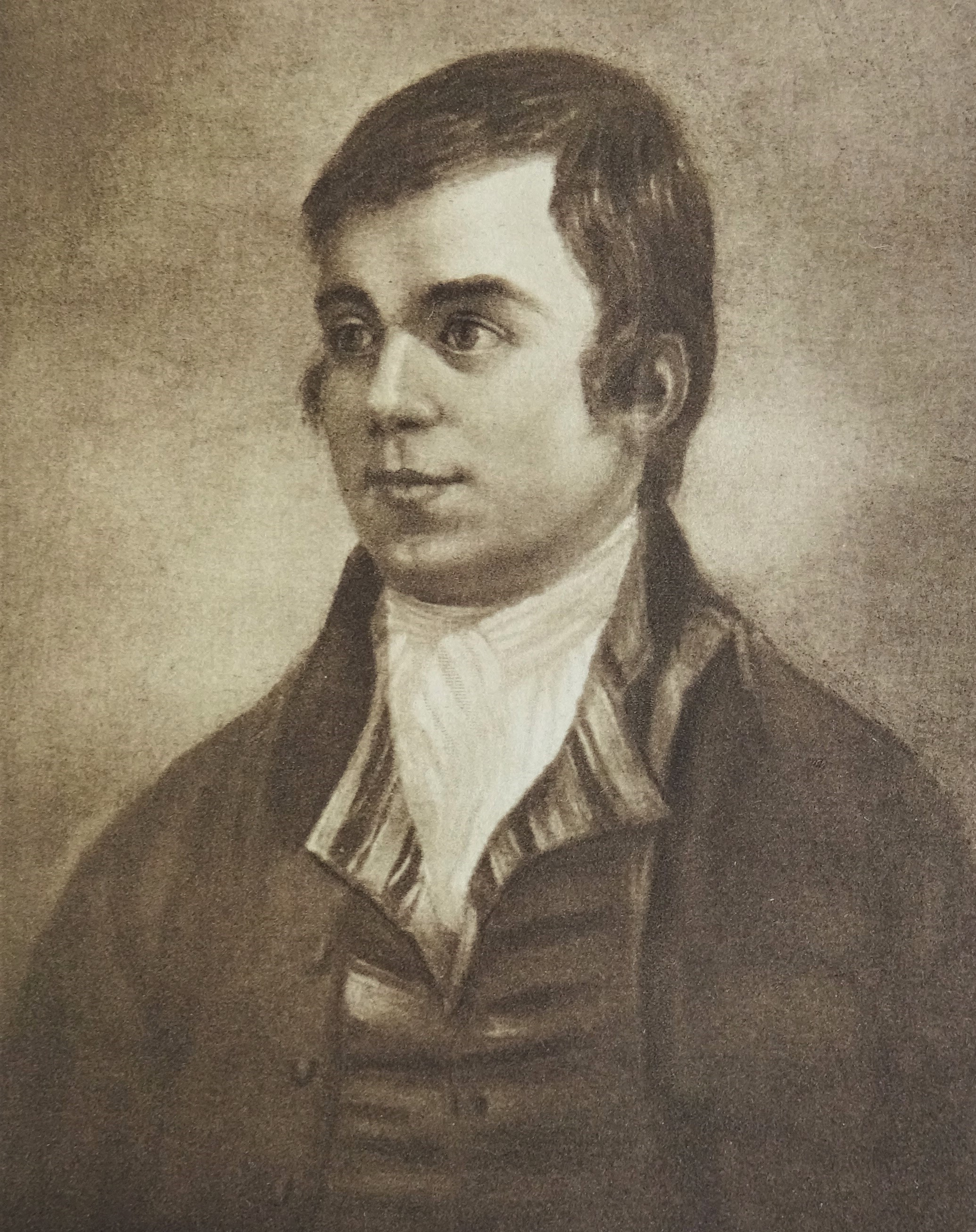
Robert Burns.

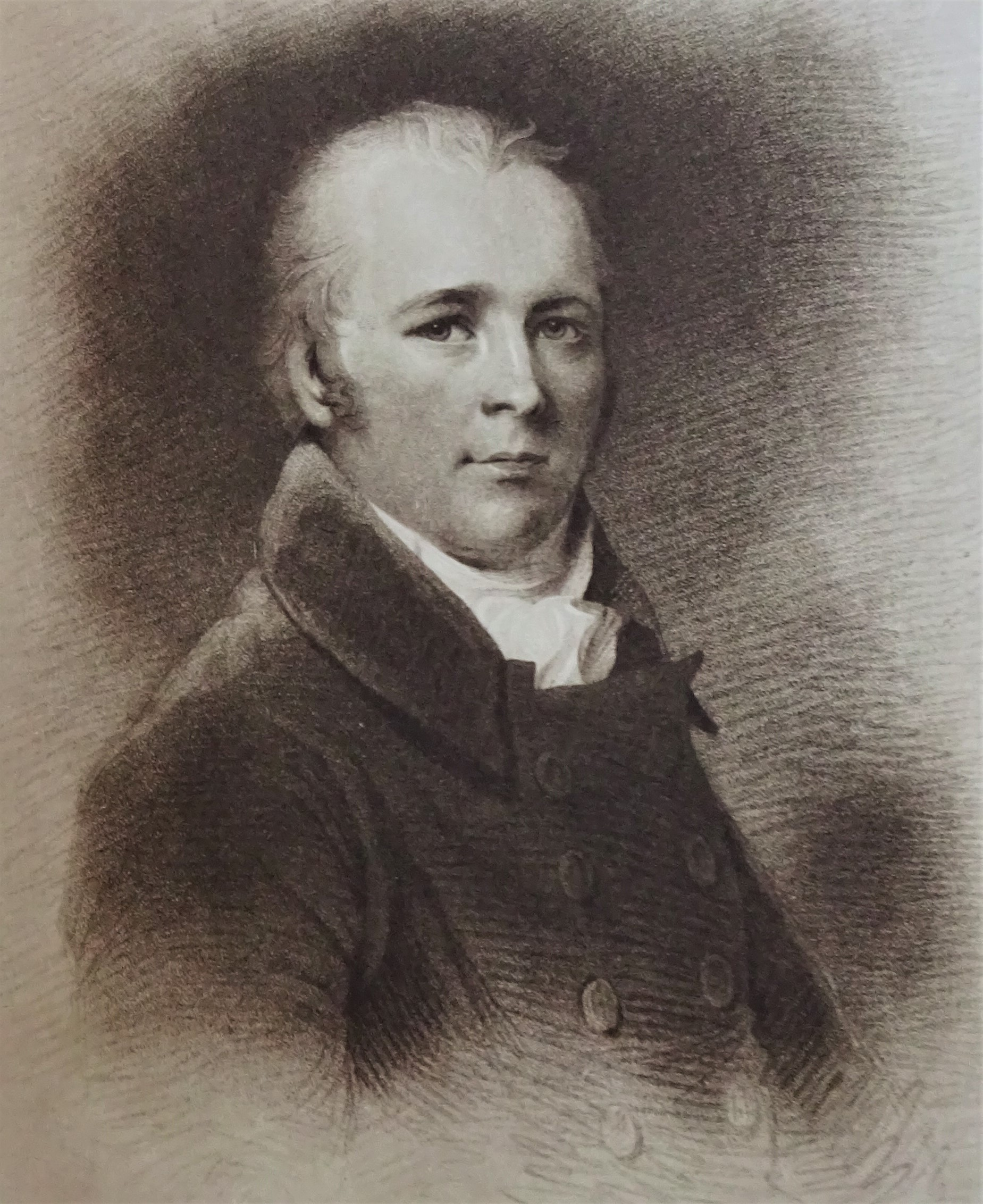
Dr James Currie.

On 23 December 1791 Findlater wrote to William Corbet, saying that Buirns was "an active, faithful and zealous officer ... capable of achieving a more arduous task than any difficulty that the theory or practice of our business can exhibit."

Findlater spoke to William Corbet, Supervisor General of Excise, on Burns's behalf about his wish to join the Port Division which came with an extra £20 in salary. He was granted the move however Mrs Dunlop was probably the major influencer.

On 11 June 1792 Findlater spent the whole with Burns visiting a brewery, victuallers, chandlers, wine and spirit merchants, etc. He commented that "Mr Burns had but lately taken charge of this Division, and from that cause, and his inexperience in the Brewery Branch of business, has fallen into these errors but promises, and I will bestow, due attention in future, which indeed he is rarely deficient in.

Findlater was Burns's immediate superior in the Excise and became his friend, defending Burns against the claims of disloyalty and ineffiency that were levelled against him in December 1792. John Syme recalled that he lunched with William Corbet, Alexander Findlater and Robert during the investigation into these accusations.

On 22 December 1794, Findlater having taken ill, Burns became Acting Supervisor in his place for several months until late April 1795. January 1795 was the coldest for many years and Burns's extra duties might take him forty mile on horseback through the snow, with a day starting before dawn and finishing an hour before midnight. The effort naturally damaged his health and his extra pay only amounted to £12 against Burns's extra accommodation costs, etc. Findlater, as Supervisor, was paid a salary of around £200 a year. He revealed his frustration in a letter to Patrick Heron, saying "The business is incessant drudgery, and would be nearly a complete bar to every species of literary pursuit."

A prominent accusation was that Burns was a hopeless drunkard, however Findlater pointed out that the Excise dismissed or demoted officers with such problems, they certainly did not promote them as in Burns's acting post as supervisor. Findlater greatly appreciated Burns's strenuous efforts and devotion to duty and this helped cement their friendship as well as giving him indelible insights into Burns's character.

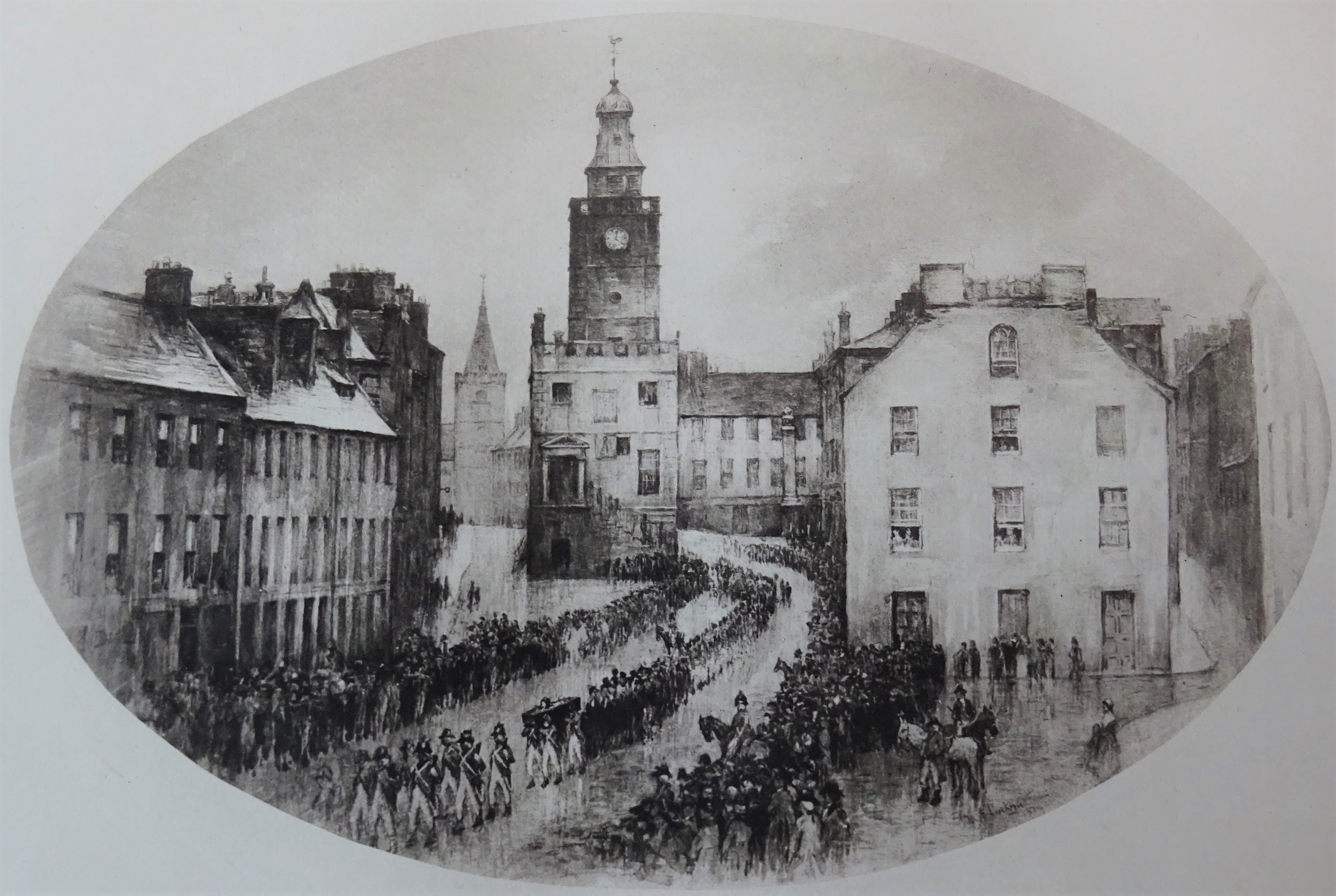
Robert Burns's funeral procession.

He joined the Royal Dumfries Volunteers shortly after Burns and John Syme, as did John Lewars. Findlater was a member of the Management Committee that recommended soliciting funds for the uniforms from the public. Burns and twenty-three others petitioned the committee against such a humiliating actions.

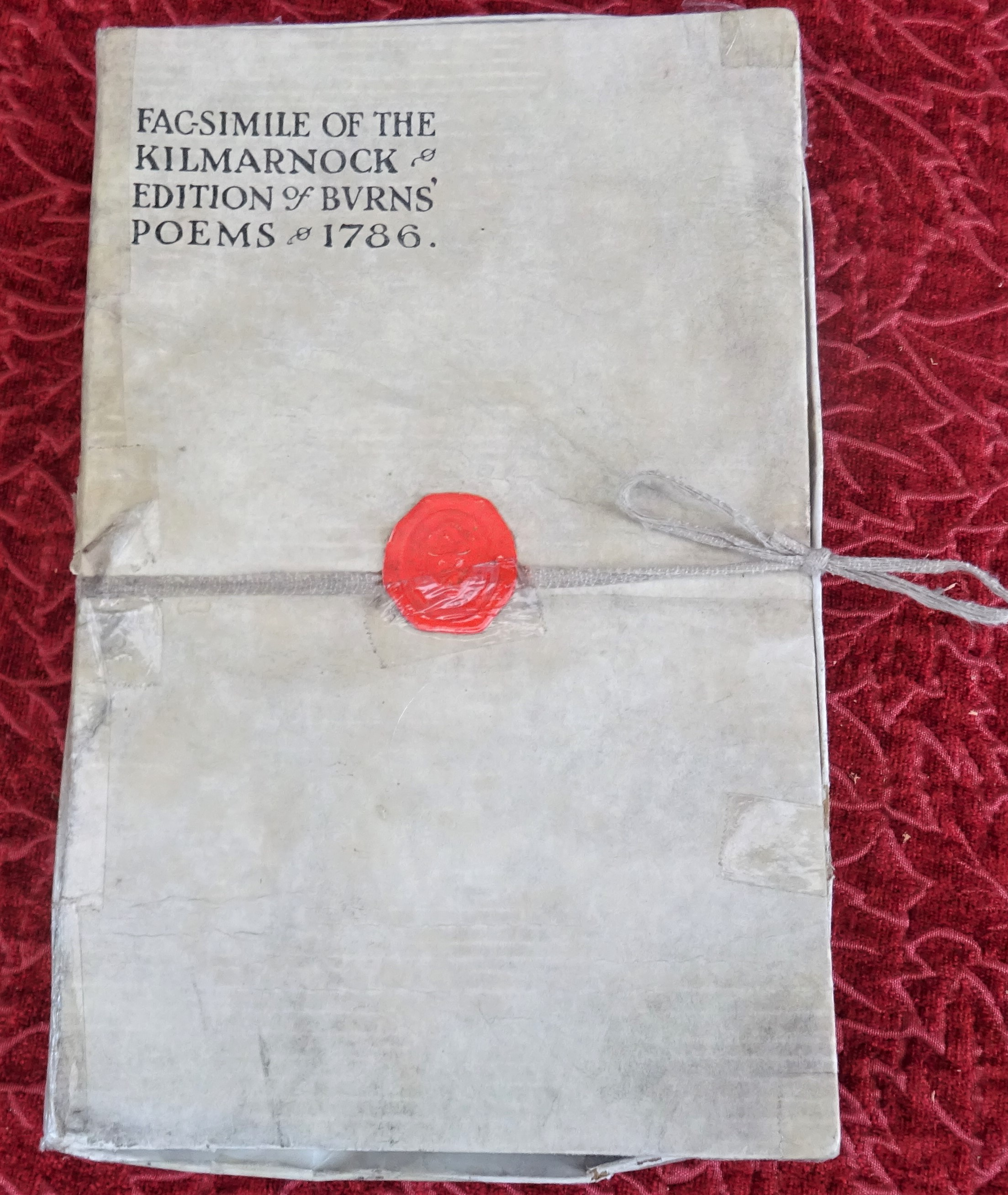
Facsimile of 'The Kilmarnock Edition' of 1786.

Burns added Findlater and John Lewars names to the subscription list for weekly issue of The Bee magazine, produced by Dr. James Anderson the agriculturist, journalist and economist. As a prominent member of the Edinburgh Philosophical Society he was a prominent figure in the Scottish Enlightenment.

In 1815 he wrote a significant letter to Alexander Peterkin regarding the 1815 edition of James Currie's The Complete Poetical Works of Robert Burns: With Explanatory and Glossarial Notes; And a Life of the Author giving a vindication of Burns's conduct and character over the time that he was his supervisor in Dumfries. He commented that "I believe I saw more of him than any other individual had occasion after he became an Excise officer’ and on another occasion, ‘few people, I believe, were more frequently in his house, particularly after he came to reside in Dumfries, and in the latter days of his life.'"

After Burns's death Findlater became a great advocate for his friend, defending him also against falsehoods spread by other biographers such as Robert Heron and Allan Cunningham.

Findlater had come to the defence of Burns's reputation in 1814 and 1834. It is not known why he let Robert Heron's libelous comments about the Excise passed without comment.

Findlater was one of those who occasionally sat for a time at Burns side in his final days.

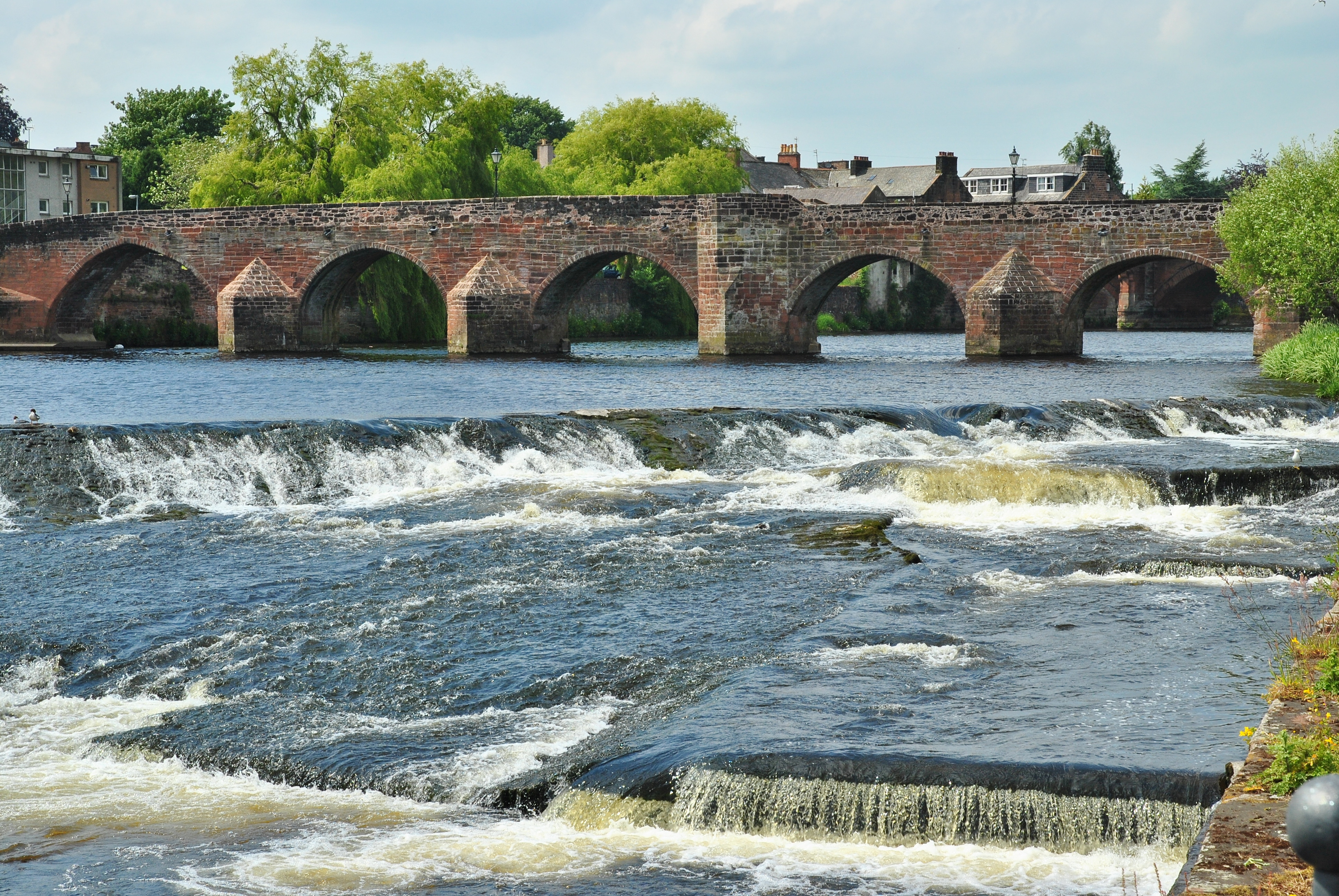
The River Nith at Dumfries

James Currie made no recorded attempt to contact Findlater for an eye witness account of the poet and his life and times in Dumfries.

He wrote that "My connection with Robert Burns commenced immediately after his admission to the Excise, and continued to the hour of his death. In all that time the superintendence of his behaviour as an officer of the Revenue, was a branch of my especial province, and it may be supposed I would not be an inattentive observer of the general conduct of a man and a poet so celebrated by his countrymen."

Findlater commented that "It is painful to trace all that has been written on this subject by Dr Currie's successors, who seem to have considered the history of the Poet as a thing like Ulysses' bow, on which each was at liberty to try his strength; and some, in order to out-do their competitors, have strained every nerve to throw all kinds of obloquy on his memory. His convivial habits, his wit and humour, his social talents, and his independent spirit, have been perverted into constant and habitual drunkenness, impiety, neglect of his preofessional duty, and of his family, and in short, almost every human vice; and all this without a shadow of proof."

Findlater concluded that "to attempt the refutation of the various other calumnies with which his memory has been assailed, some of which are so absurd as hardly to merit any attention, does not fall in my way, though I hope they will be suitably taken notice of."

== Correspondence ==
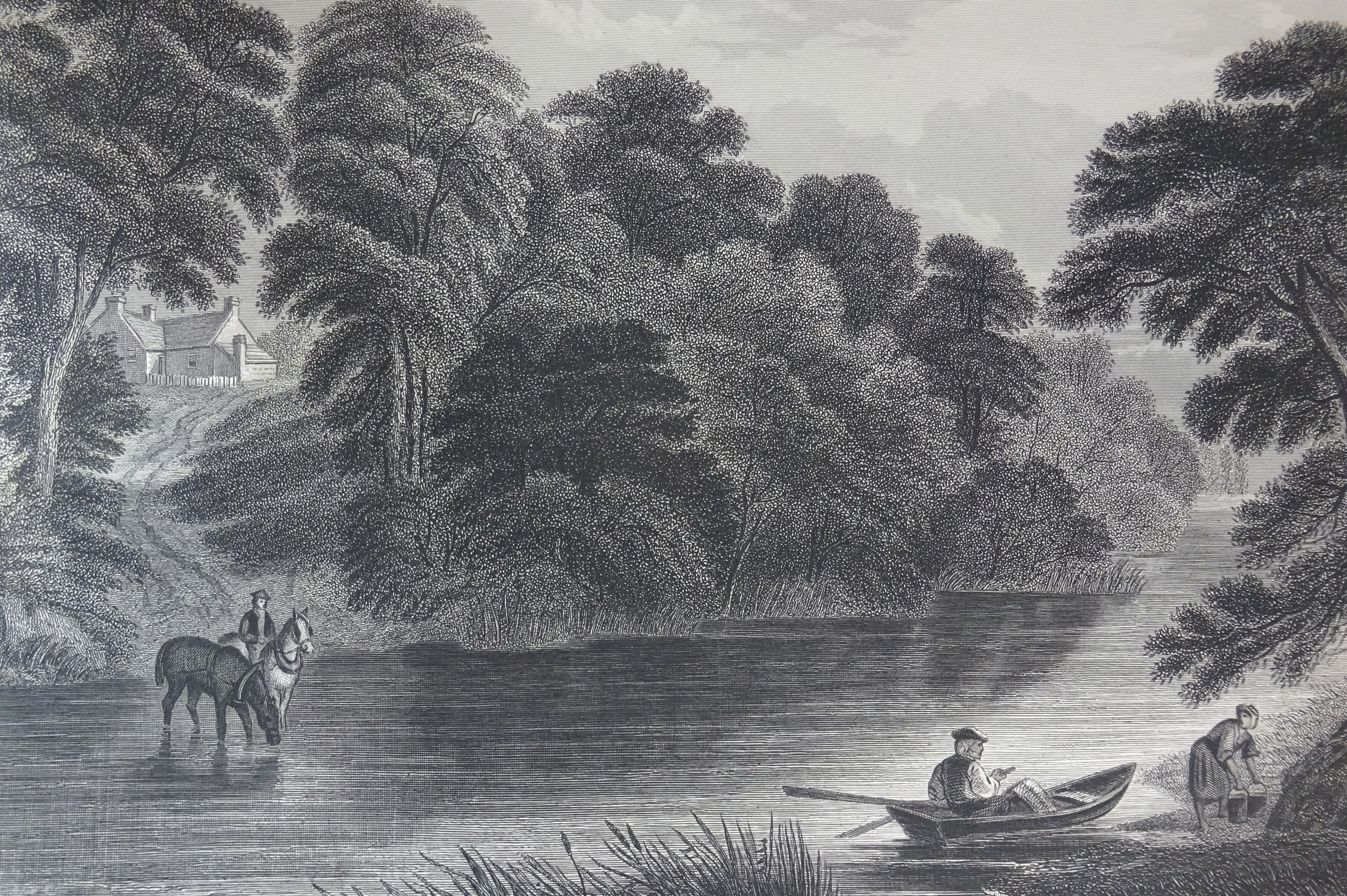
Ellisland Fam and the River Nith.

Burns first wrote to Findlater on 28 October 1789 from Ellisland Farm, some time before he himself moved to Dumfries:

I believe I mentioned something to you yesternight of the character that Mr Corbet told me you had given of me to our Edinburgh Excise folk, but my conscience accuses me that I did not make the proper acknowledgement to you for your goodness. – Most sincerely & gratefully do I thank you, Sir, for this uncommon instance of kindness & friendship. I mean not by this as if I would propitiate your future inspection of my conduct. No, Sir; I trust to act, and I shall act, so as to defy Scrutiny; but I send this as a sheer tribute of Gratitude to a Gentleman whose goodness has laid me under very great obligations, and for whose character as a GENTLEMAN I have the highest esteem. – It may very probably never be in my power to repay, but it is equally out of my power to forget, the obligations you have laid on.

Burns sent Findlater a gift of new laid eggs from Ellisland Farm with an accompanying note "Mrs Burns, like a true good wife, looking on my taste as a Standard, & knowing that she cannot give me anything --"eateable" more agreeable than a new-laid egg, she begs your acceptance of a few. They are all of them couch, not thirty hours out".

Burns wrote the following couplet "To Alexander Findlater"

The Exciseman and the Gentleman in one,
I point thee, Findlater, for thou'st the man.

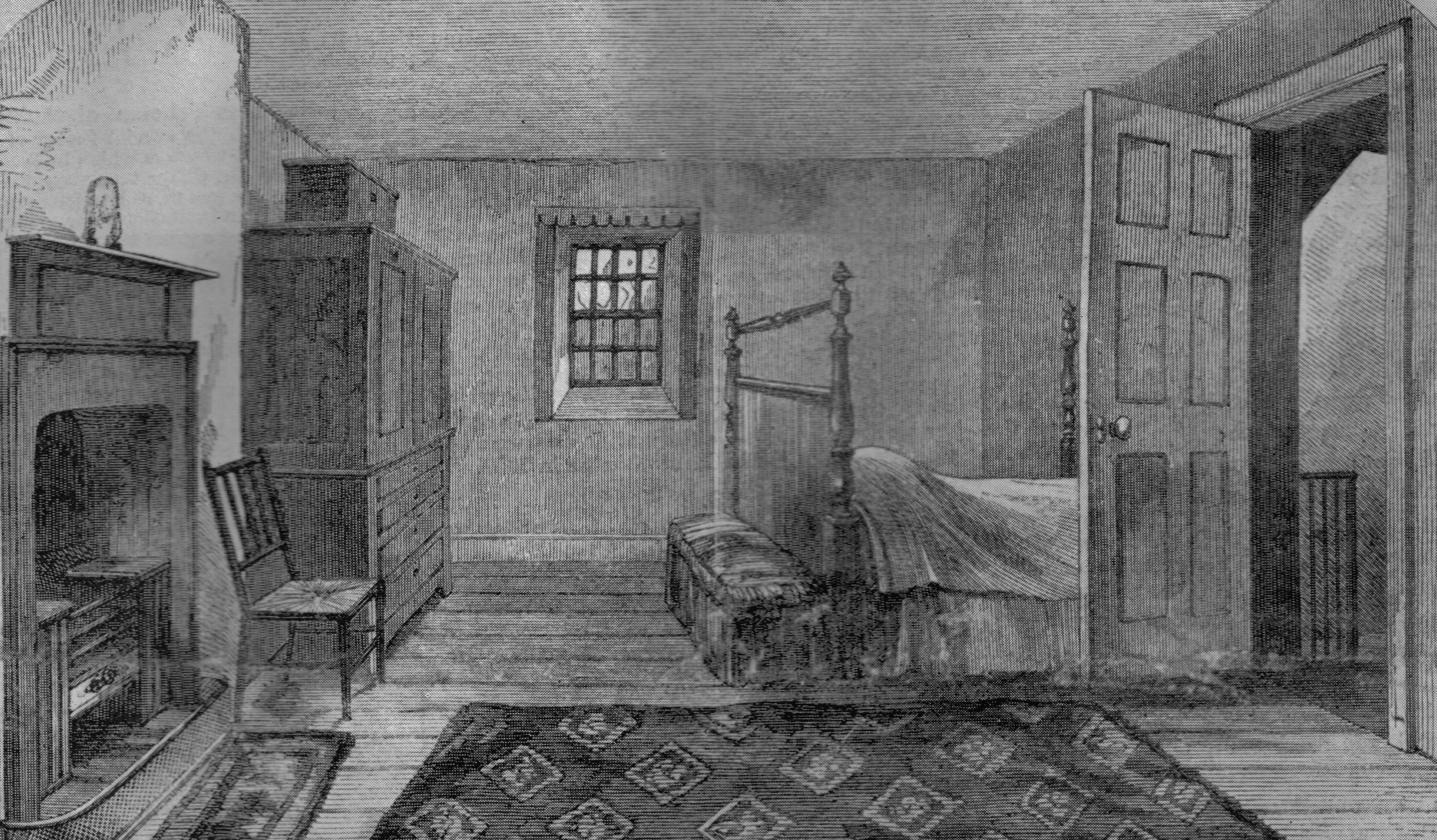
The room in which Robert Burns died.

In June 1791 Burns wrote to Findlater regarding an incident in which he made an error in surveying stock. This took place during his official Excise duties and resulted in a reprimand and showed that his friend, Supervisor Findlate, was still very much his manager:

I am both much surprised and vexed at that accident of Lorimer's stock. The last survey I made prior to Mr Lorimer's going to Edin'. I was very particular in my inspection and the quantity was certainly in his possession as I stated it. The surveys I have made during his absence might as well have been marked "key absent", as I never found any body but the lady .. and one of the times, it would have rejoiced all Hell to have seen her so drunk. I have not surveyed there since his return. I know the gentleman's ways are, like the grace of G-d, pass all comprehension; but I shall give the house a severe scrutiny tomorrow morning, and send you in the naked facts.

I know, Sir, and regret deeply that this business glances with a malign aspect on my character as an officer; but ... as this single instance of the least shadow of carelessness or impropriety in my conduct as an Officer, I shall be peculiarly unfortunate if my character shall fall a sacrifice to the dark manoeuvres [sic] of a Smuggler.

The "Smuggler" in question is often said to be none other than the brewer William Lorimer, the father of Burns's friend and correspondent Jean "Chloris" Lorimer of Kemys Hall Farm, however Mackay identifies the smuggler with a William Lorimer of Cairnmill.

Burns had included a note "I send you some rhymes I have just finished which tickle my fancy a little."

In a letter to Robert Graham of Fintry on 7 January 1794 Burns lays out some of his ideas for improving the Excise in his areas but adds "Mr. Findlater, my Supervisor, who is not only one of the first, if not the very first, of Excisemen in your Service, but is also one of the worthiest felloes in the universe; he, I know, would be hurt at it; & as he is one of my most intimate friends, you can easily figure how it would place me, to have my plan known to be mine.

In May 1794 to Peter Hill, Bookseller in Edinburgh, Burns comments on Findlater "Allow me to introduce Mr. Findlater to you, our Supervisor of Excise; & a gentleman of great information & the first worth. I lie & have long lain under great obligation to him ..."

Burns wrote a personal and suggestive letter to Findlater concerning Jean "Chloris" Whelpdale nee Lorimer:

I have been among the Angelic World, this forenoon. Ah!

"had ye but been where I hae been,
Ye wad hae been so canty, O!"

But don't be afraid: I did not dare to touch the ark of the Covenant; nor even to cast a prophane eye to the mercy-seat, where it is hid among the feathered Cherubim. I am in the clouds elsewhere -

"Ah, Chloris, could I now but sit
As unconcerned as when
Your infant beauty could beget
Nor happiness nor pain."

Dr James Adams MD knew Burns's "Chloris" as a child and he also knew Mrs. Findlater, both of whom had numerous Burns manuscripts which they used to give to Adams’s father, their doctor, instead of payment for medical services. Mrs. Findlater’s had so many manuscripts that Adams recalled how he and her son as children "frequently used the unwritten sides of the sheets for our artistic aspirations in delineating houses, beasts, and boats."
