= Margaret Chalmers (Mrs Lewis Hay) =

Lifelong friend of Scottish poet Robert Burns

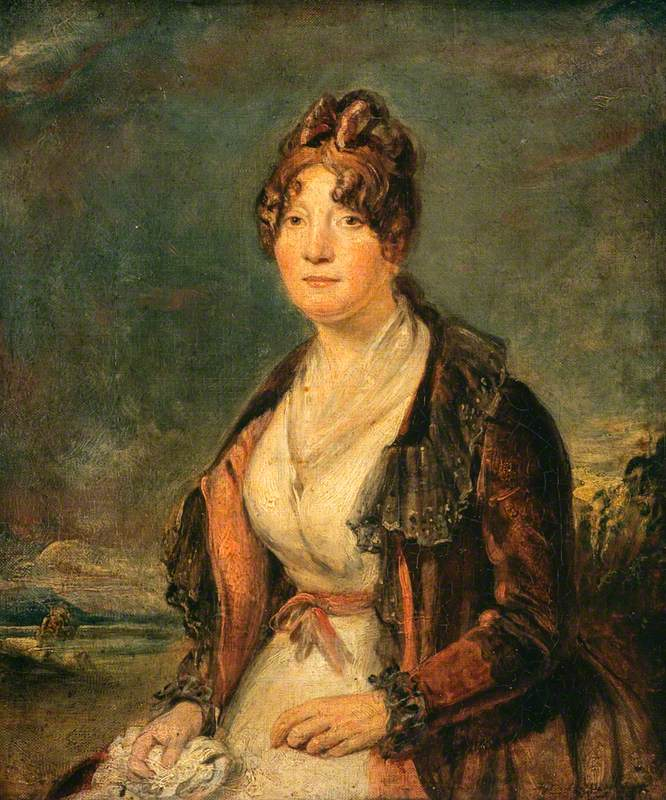
- Margaret Chalmers
- Born: 1763; Fingland, Kircudrightshire
- Died: 3 March 1843; Pau, France
- Occupations: Wife, Musician and vocalist

Margaret Chalmers (1763–1843) or Mrs Lewis Hay was a lifelong friend of Robert Burns and had once turned down his offer of marriage. She married Lewis Hay, who died in 1800. She emigrated to Pau sometime after 1820 where she died in 1843. She corresponded with the poet between 1787 and 1792 although most of these letters were destroyed. One of his last completed works,“Fairest Maid on Devon Banks”, may have been written with her in mind, however her cousin Charlotte Hamilton is the stronger contender.

== Life and character ==
Margaret or Peggy was born the youngest daughter on the Fingland Estate near St John's Town of Dalry in Kircudbrightshire, now Dumfries and Galloway, however her father, James Chalmers, was forced through financial difficulties to sell up and rent Braehead Farm on Haugh Road, two miles or so to the south of Mauchline, East Ayrshire where she could have first encountered Robert Burns whilst he was living at Mossgiel Farm. She was well versed in literature, although largely self-taught, also in music and she was a competent singer of Scots songs.

Euphemia Chalmers née Murdoch, Peggy's mother, made Burns's acquaintance at the Harvieston Estate when he was on his tour of the West Highlands. Euphemia was the daughter of the last Laird of Cumloddan in the Stewartry of Kircudbright.

Peggy’s engagement to banker Lewis Hay, who was about 25 years her senior, was kept secret from her family. Hay had begun working at the firm of Coutts Brothers & Co. in 1755, just a year after Sir William Forbes (1739-1806) and one year before James Hunter (1741-1787). In 1787 Hay was made junior partner in the Edinburgh bank Forbes, Hunter & Co. Peggy and Hay married on 9 December 1788 and lived under the same roof as the counting house on Parliament Square. Lewis died there on 28 February 1800 from inflamed lungs after a severe cold, leaving Peggy widowed with six young children. By economizing she was declared able to manage the affairs of her children and moved to 12 Buccleuch Place.

Around 1822 or 1823 one son and Peggy moved with three daughters to Pau, France, where they were members of the reformed religion. Peggy donated 100 francs for the building of the Protestant Church completed in 1841. She died at Pau on 3 March 1843, aged 80.

== Association with Robert Burns ==
Burns was much taken with Peggy and her bosom friend and relative Charlotte Hamilton, often speaking of them together in his letters. On 21 November 1787 he told Peggy that Charlotte and she are two favourite resting places for his soul, in its "wanderings through the weary, thorny wilderness of this world."

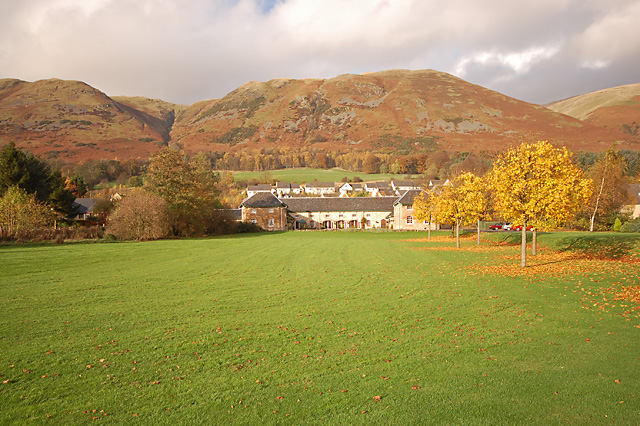
Harviestoun House

Following his Highland Tour Burns spent eight days in October 1787 at the Harviestoun Estate near Dollar in Peggy's company. She was a relative of Burns's good friend Gavin Hamilton, her mother's sister being his stepmother. A memorial cairn commemorating Burns's visit has been built at Harviestoun Castle.

Burns wrote a detailed record of his first Harviestoun visit to Gavin Hamilton mentioning Grace Hamilton and paying particular attention to Charlotte Hamilton, Peggy though was absent on this occasion, much to his disappointment.

Whilst in Edinburgh, living with her mother in 1786 and 1787, Peggy often played the piano and sang for the blind Dr Thomas Blacklock and Burns could well have met her again at his home in West Nicholson Street.

Peggy confided in the poet Thomas Campbell that, as stated, Burns had made a proposal of marriage. However, she had managed a tactful refusal as she was already secretly engaged to Lewis Hay and they managed to remain friends.

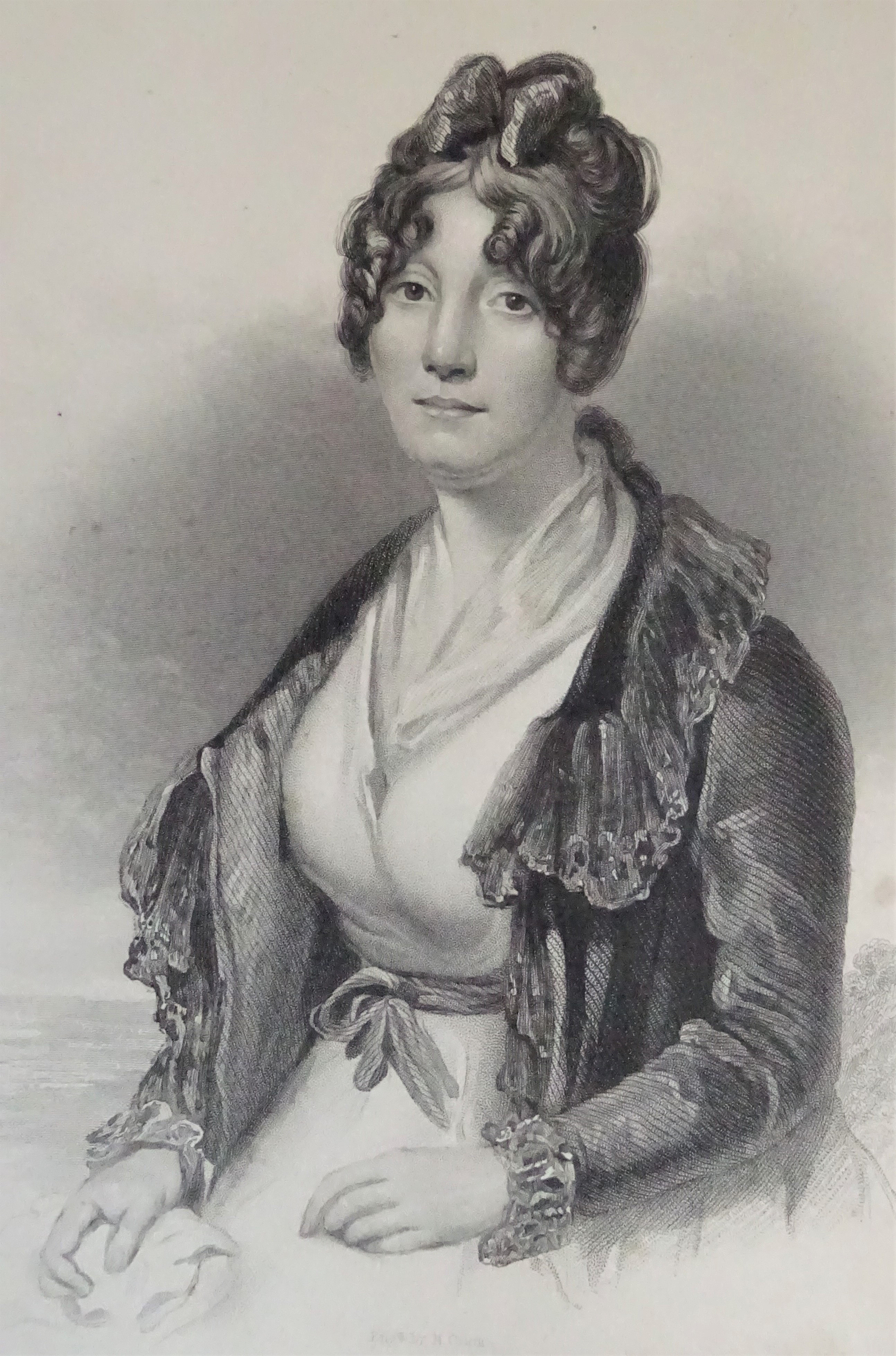
Margaret 'Peggy' Chalmers aka Mrs Lewis Hay

Burns was rather too fond of adding French phrases to his correspondence with Peggy and Thomas Campbell related a story that on an occasion Burns was teasingly introduced by Peggy to a French lady in a social setting with whom he attempted a conversation in her native language. The result was that neither understood the other and the poet unintentionally managed to insult the lady. Burns later took French lessons with Louis Cauvin's at his home, accompanied by John Beugo as a result of this embarrassing interaction.

Only nine days before the poet's death he posted the song the “Fairest Maid on Devon Banks” to George Thomson from the Brow Well. As stated it has been suggested that it was written for Margaret ‘Peggy’ Chalmers, although Charlotte Hamilton, her friend and relative seems more likely. Peggy was one of the only two younger women with whom Burns became friendly on an intellectual basis, Maria Riddell being the other. Burns continuing love for her is obvious and he remarked in a letter of 10 January 1788, to Agnes Maclehose aka Clarinda, that he registered a female friend “in my heart's core by Peggy Chalmers”.

Fairest Maid on Devon banks,
Crystal Devon, winding Devon,
Wilt thou lay that frown aside,
And smile as thou wert wont to do.

Full well thou knowest I love thee dear,
Couldst thou to malice lend an ear!
O did not Love exclaim, 'Forbear,
'Nor use a faithful lover so.'

Fairest Maid on Devon banks,
Crystal Devon, winding Devon,
Wilt thou lay that frown aside,
And smile as thou wert wont to do.

Then come, thou fairest of the fair,
Those wonted smiles O let me share;
And by thy beauteous self I swear,
No love but thine my heart shall know.

Burns referred to Peggy in two of his love songs, one being "Where Braving Angry Winter's Storms" set to Neil Gow's tune "Lamentation for Abercairny" and published in 1788 in the Scots Musical Museum. The other was "My Peggy's Face, My Peggy's Form" and this was published by Thomson with 'Mary' replacing 'Peggy' in 1802 to the tune "The Ewie wi' the Crooked Horn" in the Select Collection of Scottish Airs.

Although sent by Burns in 1787 it was not until 1803 that it was published as "My Peggy's Face, My Peggy's Form with an unnamed tune:

"My Peggy's face, my Peggy's form,
The frost of hermit age might warm;
My Peggy's worth, my Peggy's mind,
Might charm the first of human kind.
I love my Peggy's angel air,
Her face so truly, heav'nly fair,
Her native grace so void of art,
But I adore my Peggy's heart."

He had written to Peggy circa December 1787 to allay her fears, saying "I just now have read yours. The poetic compliments I pay cannot be misunderstood. They are neither of them so particular as to point you out to the world at large; and the circle of your acquaintances will allow all I have said. Besides I have complimented you chiefly, almost solely, on your mental charms. Shall I be so plain with you? I will, so look to it. Personal attractions, madam, you have much above par; wit, understanding and worth, you possess in the first class. This is a cursed flat way of telling you these truths, but let me hear no more of your sheepish timidity."

It was at a tea-party given by Peggy's friend Miss Nimmo that Burns first met Agnes Maclehose.

On 10 January 1788 Burns wrote to Agnes Maclehose about his closest friends saying that "I should have a third, but she is surrounded by the blandishments of flattery and courtship. Her I register in my heart's core by Peggy Chalmers: Miss Nimmo can tell you how divine she is. She is worthy of a place in thesame bosom with my clarinda. That is the highest compliment i can pay her."

In a letter dated 31 January 1788, Agnes Maclehose wrote "Miss Chalmers' letters are charming. Why did not such a woman secure your heart? O the caprice of human nature, to fix on impossibilities." Burns had sent her a selection of Peggy's letters and she seems to have decided to use Peggy to deflect some of Burns's attention away from herself.

After his return from his tour of the West Highlands he wrote to James Smith and refers to a lady who he had taken a great liking to, but who had overestimated his intentions and had written to him with a firm rejection. Burns however wrote that "But I am an old hawk at the sport; and wrote her such a cool, deliberate, prudent reply as brought my bird from her aerial towerings, pop, down at my foot like corporal Trims hat." It has been suggested that the lady was Peggy. The manuscript letter has been lost and the name removed in the published text.

After Burns's death Peggy's husband, Lewis Hay, ensured that despite a lack of precedent his bank would assist with raising funds for Jean and her family.

=== Correspondence ===
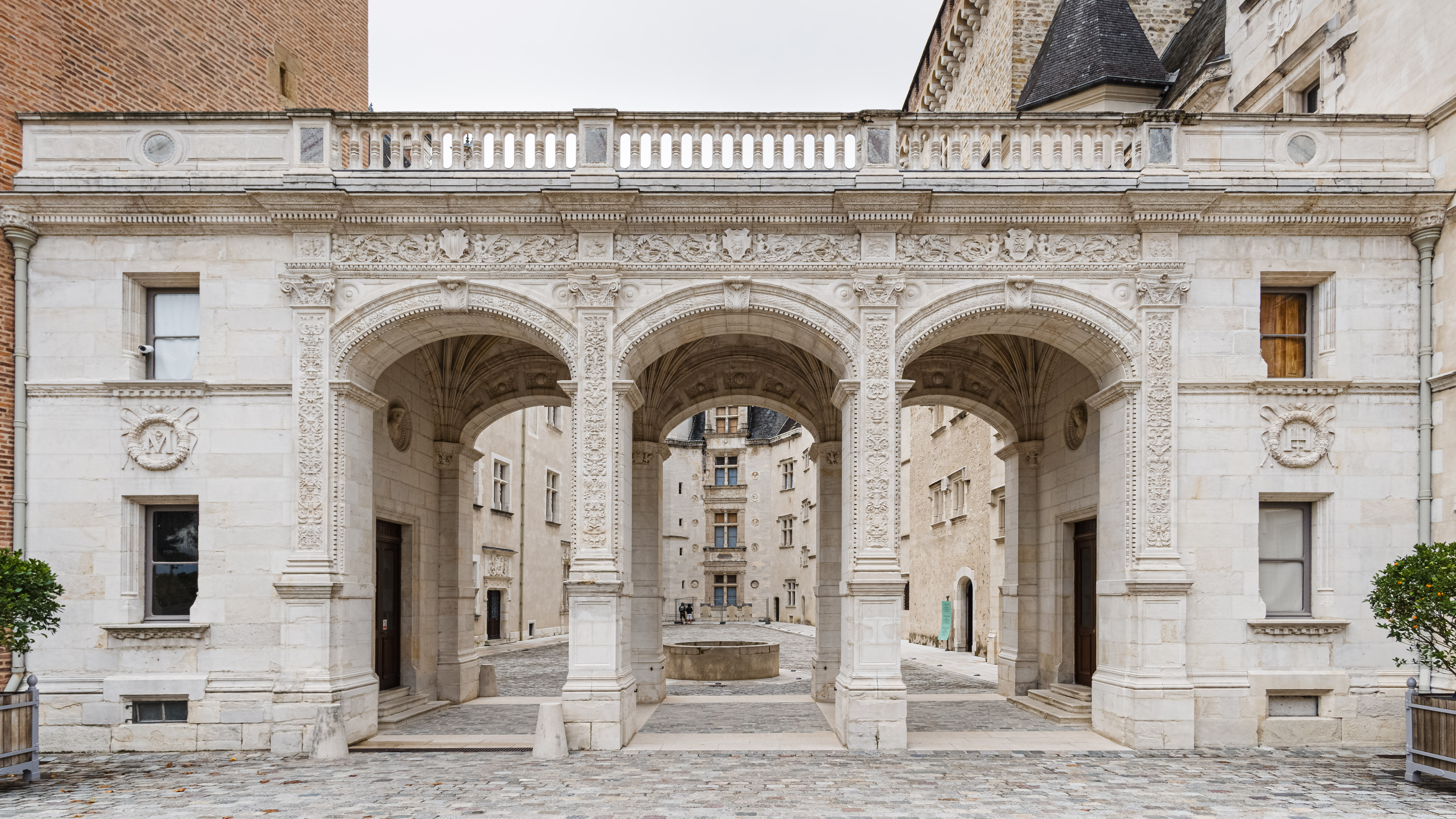
Entrance to Pau Castle.

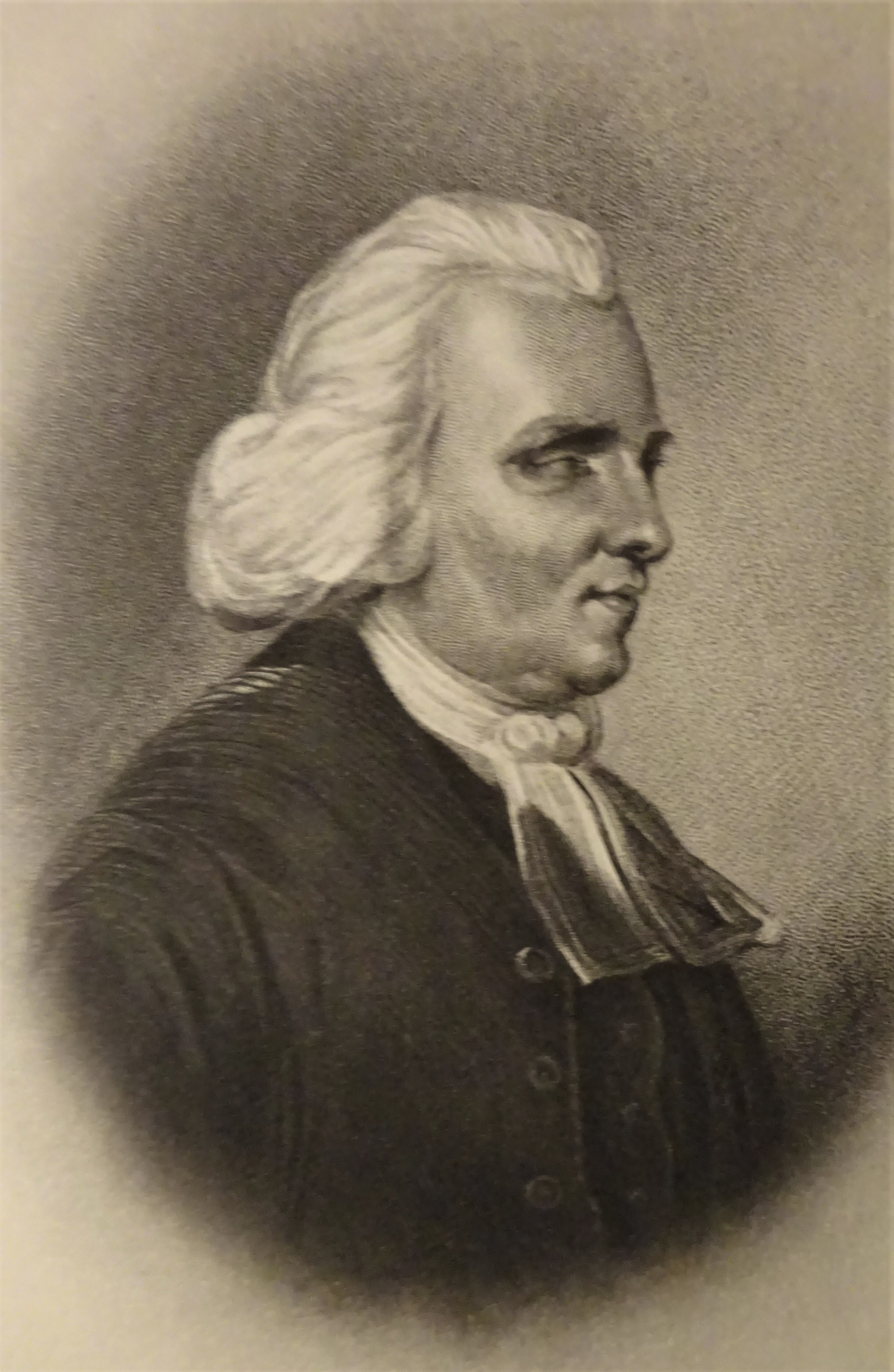
Dr Thomas Blacklock

A number of his letters were not dated and this had led to different authors sometimes giving differing dates for the eleven known examples of his correspondence. None of the five recorded letters from Peggy survive and none were copied.

Circa January 1787 Burns is generally accepted to have written to Peggy "My Dr Countrywoman ... I know you will laugh at it, when I tell you that your Pianoforte and you together have play'd the deuce somehow about my heart - I was once a zealous Devotee to your sex, but you know the black story at home. My breast has been widowed these many months and I thought myself proof against the fascinating witchcraft; but I am afraid you will 'feelingly convince me what I am.' - I say, I am afraid, because I am not sure what is the matter with me. - I have one miserable bad symptom, which I doubt threatens ill: when you whisper, or look kindly to another, it gives me a draught of damnation."

In October 1787 he wrote that "I am determined to pay Charlotte a poetic compliment, if I could hit on some glorious old Scotch air, in number second. You will see a small attempt on a shred of paper in the book; but, though Dr Blacklock commended it very highly, I am not just satisfied with it myself."

On 21 November 1787 Burns wrote "I insist that you shall write whatever comes first: what you see, what you read, what you hear, what you admire, what you dislike, trifles, bagatelles, nonsense; or fill up a corner, e'en put down a laugh at full length."

On 12 December 1787, he wrote to Peggy from Edinburgh "I am here under the care of a surgeon, with a bruised limb extended on a cushion .... I have taken tooth and nail to the Bible, and am got through the five books of Mosses, and half way in Joshua. It is really a glorious book." He goes on say "I inclose you a proof copy of the "Banks of the Devon," which present with my best wishes to Charlotte. The "Ochel-hills" you shall probably have next week for yourself. None of your fine speeches."

On 22 January 1788, he wrote to Peggy commenting that he had broke measures with his publisher William Creech and wrote him a frosty, keen letter saying that he had promised me upon his honour that I should have the account on Monday; but this is Tuesday and I still have not heard a word from him. Burns finished by saying that my limb will soon be sound, and I shall struggle on.

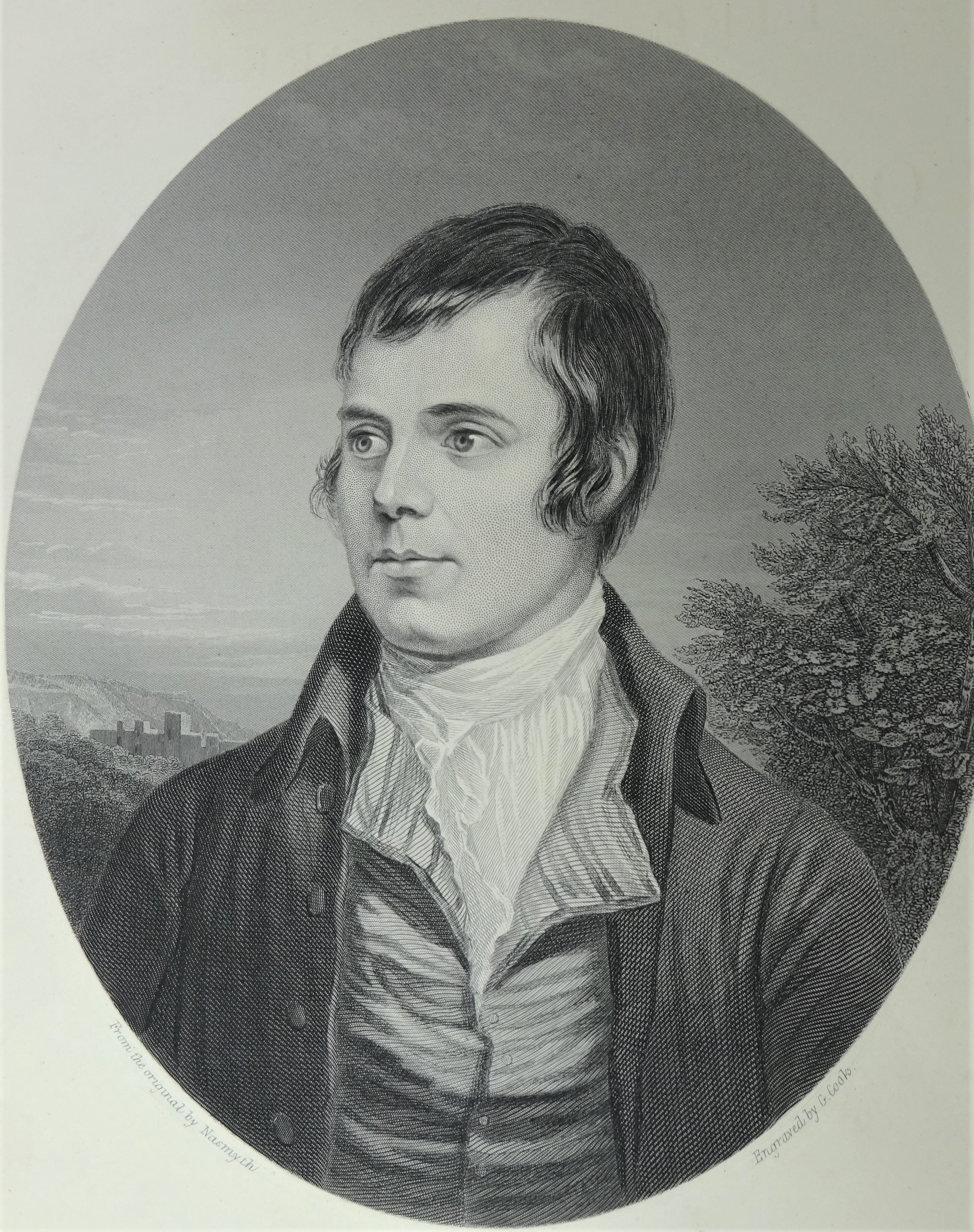
Robert Burns after Nasmyth and Beugo

On 14 March 1788, he wrote informing her that "Yesternight I compleated a bargain with Mr Miller, of Dalswinton, for the farm of Ellisland, on the banks of the Nith, between five and six miles above Dumfries. I begin at Whit-Sunday to build a house, drive lime, etc.; and heaven be may help! for it will take a strong effort to bring my mind into the routine of business."

He shared his plans in connection with the Excise Service writing that "You will condemn me for the next step I have taken: I have entered into the Excise. I stay in the West about three weeks, and then return to Edinburgh for six weeks' instructions: afterwards, for I get employ instantly ... The question is not at what door of fortune's palace shall we enter in; but what doors she open to us."

On 7 April 1788 Burns wrote saying "I am going on a good deal progressive in "mon grand but", the sober science of life. I have lately made some sacrifices for which, were I "viva voce" with you to paint the situation and recount the circumstances, you would applaud me. This suggests that he given up his bachelorhood and had acknowledged Jean Armour as his wife."

In what was to be his last known letter to her, the recently married Burns wrote to her from near Ellisland Farm on 16 September 1788 saying"I am here, driven in with my harvest-folk by bad weather; and as you and your sister once did me the honour of interesting yourselves much a l'egard de moi, I sit down to beg the continuation of your goodness. I can truly say that, all the exterior of life apart, I never saw two whose esteem flattered the nobler feelings of my soul." "When I think of you - hearts the best, minds the noblest, of human kind - unfortunate, even the shades of life - when I think I have met with you, and have lived more of a real life with you in eight days, that I can do with almost anybody I met in eight years. When I think on the improbability of meeting you again in this world - I could sit down an cry like a child"

Burns also revealed to Peggy on 16 September that "Mrs Burns ... although she scarcely ever in her life, except the Scriptures of the Old and New Testament, and the Psalms of David in metre, spent five minutes together on prose or verse. I must except from this last, a certain late publication of Scots poems which she has perused very devoutly."

Many of Peggy's letters to Burns have not been found and according to R.H.Cromek they were thrown into a fire by Gavin Hamilton's sister, Peggy's great friend, Mrs Adair aka Charlotte Hamilton. The details of under what circumstances those letters that were recorded had their details taken down is not known apart from the statement that "fragments as were found amongst the Bard's memoranda". and therefore the veracity of the text is open to question.

Burn's mention the renowned Ayrshire character, the Rev David Smeaton of Kilmaurs, to Peggy in a letter 21 October 1787 saying "... is to me as insufferable as the preaching cant of old Father Smeaton, Whig-minister at Kilmaurs. Darts, flames, Cupids, loves, graces, and all that farrago, are just a Mauchline sacrament, a senseless rabble".

In a letter to Crauford Tait dated 15 October 1790, Burns asks that "If you have an opportunity, please remember me in the solemn league and covenant of friendship to Mrs. Lewis Hay. I am a wretch for not writing to her; but I am so hackneyed with self-accusation in that way, that my conscience lies in my bosom with scarce the sensibility of an oyster in its shell."

Peggy is known to have written to Burns twice between 1788 and 1792 and one was an invitation to visit her at Parliament Square. It is not known whether Burns ever met Peggy after her marriage in 1788.
