= John Mackenzie =

John, Johnny, or Jock Mackenzie or MacKenzie may refer to:

== Academics ==
- John Mackenzie (1806–1848), Scottish literary scholar
- John Stuart Mackenzie (1860–1935), British philosopher
- John M. MacKenzie (born 1943), British historian

== Law and politics ==
- John Muir Mackenzie (1854–1916), British governor of Bombay
- John Ashton MacKenzie (1917–2010), U.S. federal judge
- John Archie MacKenzie (1934–2017), Canadian politician in Nova Scotia

== Military ==
- John Mackenzie, Lord MacLeod (1727–1789), Scottish army officer
- John Randoll Mackenzie (1763–1809), Scottish army general
- John Mackenzie (VC) (1869–1915), Scottish military officer
- John MacKenzie (Medal of Honor) (1886–1933), American naval sailor
- John Noble MacKenzie (1914–1993), New Zealand military flying ace

== Religion ==
- John Mackenzie (missionary) (1835–1899), Scottish missionary in Southern Africa
- John W. Mackenzie (c. 1845–1914), Canadian missionary to Vanuatu
- John Kenneth MacKenzie (1850–1886), English medical missionary to China

== Science and medicine ==
- John MacKenzie (doctor) (died 1837), Scottish surgeon
- John Joseph Mackenzie (1865–1922), Canadian pathologist
- John Edwin MacKenzie (1868–1955), Scottish chemist
- John Gretton Mackenzie (1881–1953), New Zealand botanist

== Sports ==
- John Mackenzie (sailor) (1876–1949), British sailor
- Jock Mackenzie (1882–?), Scottish footballer
- Jock MacKenzie (1885–1940), Scottish footballer
- Johnny MacKenzie (1925–2017), Scottish footballer

== Others ==
- John Mackenzie, 9th of Kintail (died 1561), Scottish chief of Clan Mackenzie
- John Mackenzie (banker) (1787–1854), Scottish banker
- John Mackenzie (colonial settler) (1793–1857), Australian pioneer
- John MacKenzie (mountain guide) (1856–1933), British mountain guide
- John Drew MacKenzie (1861–1918), British artistic craftsman
- John Mackenzie (film director) (1928–2011), Scottish film director
- John Mackenzie, 5th Earl of Cromartie (born 1948), Scottish chief of Clan Mackenzie

== See also ==
- John McKenzie (disambiguation)
- Jack McKenzie (disambiguation)
