= John McKenzie =

John McKenzie may refer to:

== Arts and entertainment ==
- John McKenzie (painter) (1831–1909), Scottish painter
- John Patrick McKenzie (born 1962), American artist is San Francisco
- John McKenzie (director), director of 1996 British comedy film Vol-au-vent
- John McKenzie (musician), British bass player active since 1970

== Politics ==
- John McKenzie (New Zealand politician) (1839–1901), New Zealand politician
- John C. McKenzie (1860–1941), American representative from Illinois
- John D. McKenzie (1889–1952), American-born businessman and political figure in Nova Scotia

== Sports ==
- John McKenzie (Australian footballer) (1885–1971), played for Geelong in 1906
- John McKenzie (Australian cricketer) (1862–1944), Australian cricketer
- John McKenzie (New Zealand cricketer) (fl. 1893–95), New Zealand cricketer
- John McKenzie (ice hockey) (1937–2018), Canadian ice hockey player
- John McKenzie (American football), American football player and coach
- Johnny McKenzie (footballer) (fl. 1930s), Scottish footballer (Third Lanark, Aberdeen)

== Others ==
- John W.P. McKenzie (died 1853), American missionary to the Choctaws and founder of McKenzie College in Texas
- John McKenzie (philanthropist) (1876–1955), New Zealand businessman
- John McKenzie (trade unionist) (1885–1958), Scottish trade unionist
- John L. McKenzie (1910–1991), American Catholic theologian
- John Grant McKenzie, Scottish Congregational minister, psychologist and academic
- John Kinsey (c. 1842 – 1904), also known as John McKenzie, American soldier

== See also ==
- John Mackenzie (disambiguation)
- Jack McKenzie (disambiguation)
