= Burns club =

Associations which celebrate Robert Burns and Scottish literature

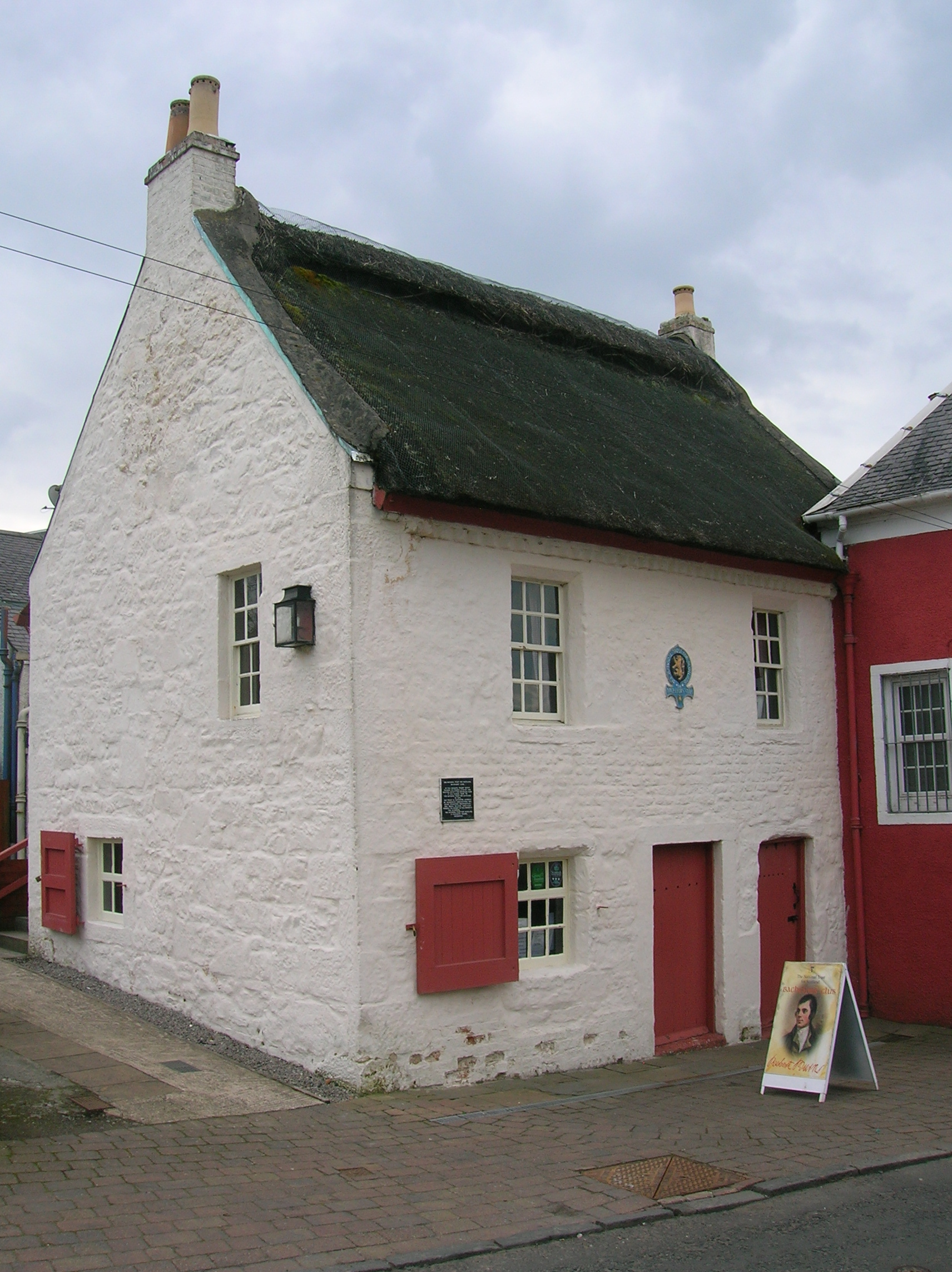
The Tarbolton Batchelors' Club, model for Burns clubs the world over.

A Burns club is a social club that exists to encourage and cherish the memory of Robert Burns, to foster a love of his writings and generally to encourage an interest in the Scots language and literature. An emphasis on encouraging the young to take an interest in Burns is found in most clubs through poetry, singing and other competitions. Once mainly existing as 'male only' clubs in the mould of the Tarbolton 'Batchelor's Club' most now welcome women as fellow members. Ladies Burns Clubs also exist such as the 'Irvine Lasses' that was established in 1975; it has appointed several male 'Honorary Lasses'.

A number of Burns clubs hold collections of Burns' manuscripts, artefacts or memorabilia, such as the Irvine Burns Club, which holds the only surviving holograph manuscripts from the Kilmarnock volume of "Poems, Chiefly in the Scottish Dialect" printed and issued by John Wilson, Kilmarnock, on 31 July 1786. Many clubs also have libraries that contain volumes from the many printed works relating to the bard and to Scottish poets, history and culture. Bridgeton Burns Club in Glasgow is the largest club by membership circa 750 and attendees at annual dinner circa 600.

Annual wreath laying ceremonies are held to commemorate personal events such as the birth and death of the poet as well as other significant events in the Bard's life, such as the publication of the Kilmarnock volume.

Many clubs are affiliated to the Burns Federation now known as the Robert Burns World Federation (RBWF) that was formed in 1885 in Kilmarnock and local associations also exist such as the Ayrshire Association of Burns Clubs and the Southern Scottish Counties Burns Association. A feature of most Burns Clubs are annual celebration suppers near or on the anniversary of the poet's birthday, 25 January 1759. In 1959 Glasgow alone had 25 Burns clubs with a membership of around 4000.

Most Burns clubs have an open membership; however, some are by invitation, often due to lack of space within their premises such as with the Burns Club Atlanta, the Dumfries Burns Howff Club and the Paisley Burns Club. Most clubs are run by a committee with either presidents or chairmen as the most senior officials usually serving a one- or two-year term. Chains of office are a distinctive feature of Burns Clubs, and these may be inscribed with the names of past presidents.

Most Burns clubs use rented facilities for their meetings, however at least five clubs have their own premises, the Irvine Burns Club, the Dundee Burns Club, the Howff Club of Dumfries, the Paisley Burns Club and the Burns Club of Atlanta. In 1920 'The Burns House Club' was inaugurated at India Street in Glasgow as a central meeting place for Burns Societies. The Burns Federation of the time met here quarterly.

== Titles ==
Most clubs are named after the settlement in which they are located, such as cities or areas within cities, towns, etc. A few clubs append a Burns linked term such as Cronies, Howff, Jolly Beggars, etc. The Alamo Burns Club is named after the inn in which its first Burns Supper was held and two Facebook clubs use Burns's name, the 'RT Burns Club - All Things Robert BURNS and Scotland' and 'The Researching the Life and Times of Robert Burns' club.

== History ==
The first Burns supper was established in around 1801, attended by Robert Aiken and the address was delivered by Hamilton Paul and within ten years many annual celebrations of the bard's life and works were taking place to the extent that the Reverend William Peebles, a target of Burns' wit, felt compelled to publish a poetical work entitled "Burnomania: the celebrity of Robert Burns considered in a Discourse addressed to all real Christians of every Denomination". By 2004 the Robert Burns World Federation alone had 400 clubs affiliated to it and these reflected a membership of approximately 60,000.

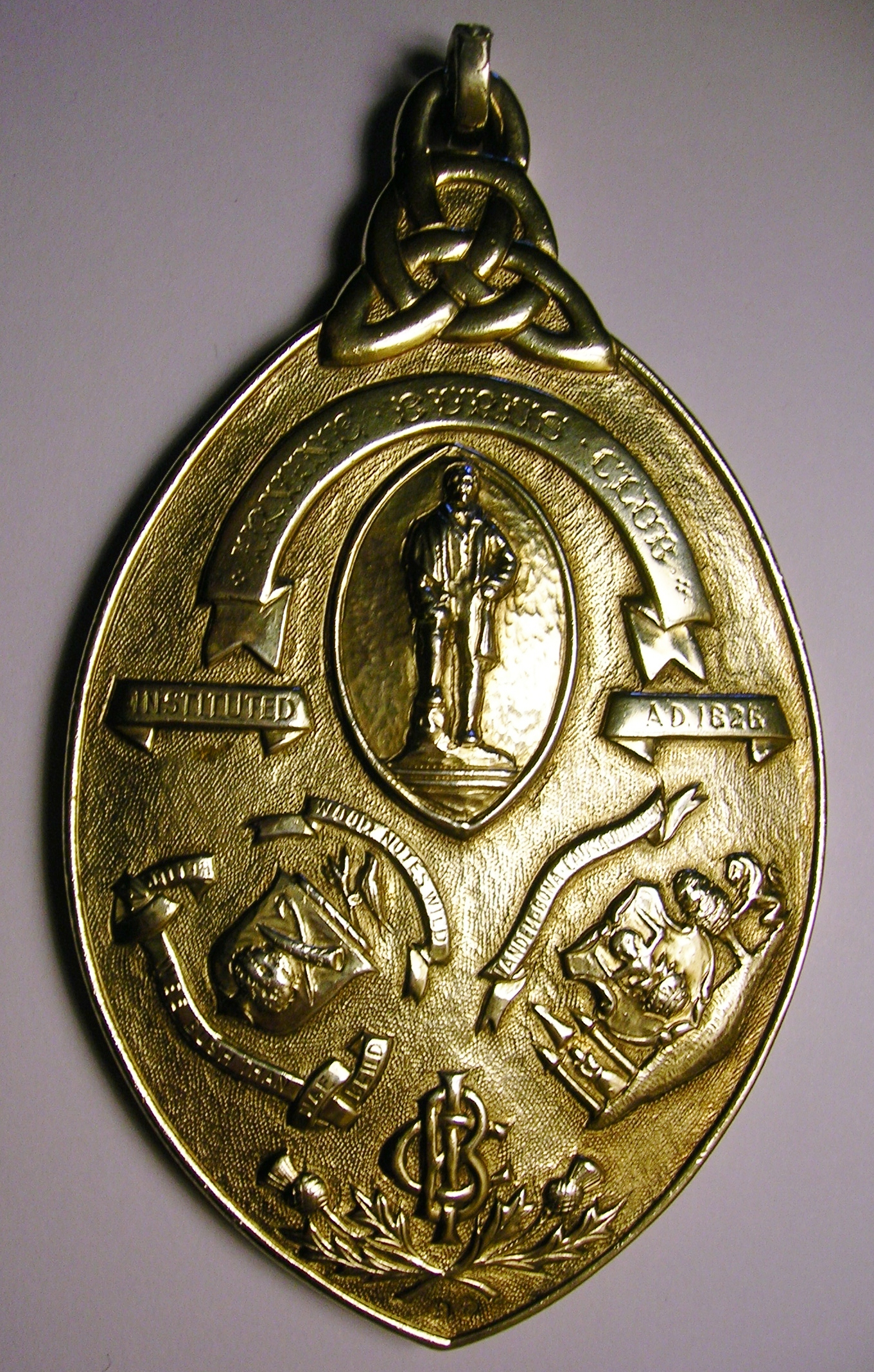
Part of the Irvine Burns Club's Presidents Chain of Office.

=== Precedence ===
The Greenock Burns Club is the 'Mother Club' and was instituted in 1801. It has had celebrations every year since. The Irvine Burns Club has an unbroken history dating back to its formation on 2 June 1826. Of the twelve founding members of the Irvine Burns Club, five were known to Robert Burns, two of whom were close friends of the poet. The Paisley Burns Club (1805) went into abeyance from 1836 to 1874. The Kilmarnock Burns Club No.0 was for a time known as the 'Mother Club' as recorded in the 1893 second issue of the 'Burns Chronicle and Club Directory.'

=== 1) Bridgeton Burns Club ===
Founded at 13 Main Street, Bridgeton in East end of Glasgow in 1870 by John Wilson and some friends. It grew rapidly in terms of members including many doctors, lawyers and professionals, in part due to its president William Freeland around 1899 being a newspaper editor. It is a charity running a schools competition to this day and has a membership and annual dinner attendance of over 600, making it almost certainly the largest in the world. It federated in 1894 as number 49 on the roll. It has attracted many politicians, judges, Lords and celebrities to speak and been the subject of an early day motion in the Houses of Parliament on the occasion of its 150th anniversary in 2020.

Although the Burns Club of London is recorded as No.1 on the Robert Burns World Federation list the Kilmarnock Burns Club was recorded as first on the register as '0'.

=== 2) Alexandria Burns Club ===
The Alexandria Burns' Club was formed in 1884, and was federated in 1885 as No. 2 in the Federation list. Its first officials were Messrs Duncan Campbell, president; William Carlile, treasurer; and Alexander Bryan, secretary. Committee meetings have been held regularly since the formation of the club.

The club holds an annual St Andrew's night celebration, but the main event is the annual supper, which is attended by up to 150 every year.

=== 3) Burns Club of Atlanta ===
Officially organized in 1896, this Burns club is a private social club and literary and cultural society commemorating the works of Robert Burns. The club holds monthly meetings and an annual Burns Supper celebration on the anniversary of Burns' birthday every year since 1898. Events are held in the Atlanta Burns Cottage, which is a replica, apart from the thatched roof, of poet Robert Burns' birthplace in Alloway, built in 1909.

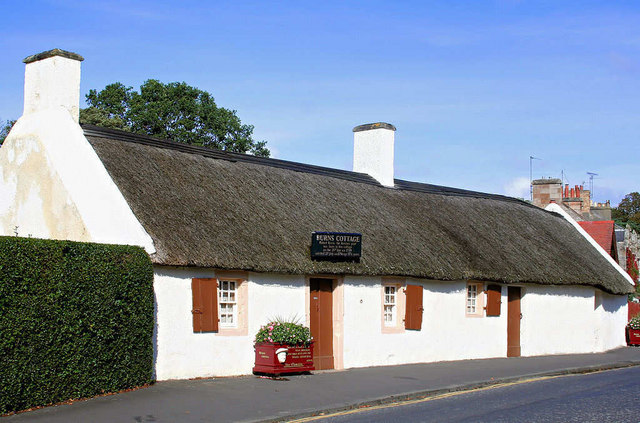
Burns Cottage, Alloway, Scotland.

=== 4) Dalry Burns Club ===
Dalry Burns Club, established in 1825 at Montgomerie's Inn in Courthill Street, now the 'Turf Inn', has one of the longest, continuous record of Burns Suppers - surpassed only by Greenock. Other Burns Clubs were established at an earlier date, but none can match Dalry's unbroken record of annual celebration of the life and works of Robert Burns. The club is 'Number 35' on the role of the Robert Burns World Federation, which was not established until 1884.

=== 5) United Burns Club of Dunfermline ===
The 'Haggis Club' first Burns club in Dunfermline, formed on 25 January 1812 and continuing until 1820. The Dunfermline Burns Club came into existence on 26 January 1820 and then in 1847 the club joined with the Junior Haggis Club to become the United Burns Club of Dunfermline.

=== 6) Calgary Burns Club ===
The Calgary Burns Club was founded in 1974 and chartered in 1976. The genesis of the Calgary Burns Club, was a Burns Supper in 1964 held in the home of John and Lilian Patterson, in Calgary Alberta, Canada. This initiated a series of Burns Suppers hosted in turn by other Calgary Scots. In 1976, a group of members gave the club its charter, named Grant MacEwan as the club's patron, and became accredited by the Burns Federation. The club has been running annual Burns Suppers ever since. The Calgary Burns Club holds the memory of Robert Burns and the fellowship arising out of that memory to be one of the most important aspects of being Scottish Calgarians. The Calgary Burns Club fosters an interest in Scottish literature, art and music by sharing its talents with the community and through support of events involving Scottish cultural activities.

=== 7) Edinburgh Burns Supper Club ===
The Edinburgh Burns Supper Club was formed in 1848 by Burns' friend and publisher George Thomson and is No. 22 on the Robert Burns World Federation list. Its dinners were attended by Arthur Conan Doyle and John Buchan. It was suspended in 1986 but revived in 2007.

=== 8) Greenock Burns Club ===
The first Burns club, known as 'The Mother Club', was inaugurated as the Greenock Ayrshire Society, in Greenock on 21 July 1801 on the 5th Anniversary of the Bard's death and the club is said to have held their and therefore the first Burns supper on 29 January 1802 in Alloway, but in 1803 it was discovered from the Ayr Parish records that James Currie had made a mistake and the correct date of birth was 25 January 1759. The club had several members who knew Burns, such as Alexander Dalziel, factor to the Earl of Glencairn at Finlaystone, Richard Brown, Burns's friend from Irvine and James Findlay, a gauger (excise) in Greenock who was married to one of the Mauchline Belles, Jean Markland. The club has held an annual celebration every year since its formation and has hosted many illustrious speakers during that time. These include Sir J.M. Barrie, Neil Munro, Lord Glenconner, Earl of Elgin and Kincardine, Sir Patrick Dollan, Compton Mackenzie, Eric Linklater, Rev. Dr. H.C. Whitley, Sir Robert Boothby, W.D. Cocker, Professor Wm. Barclay and more recently, Lord Steel of Aikwood, Baron Wallace of Tankerness and Prof. Gerard Carruthers.

=== 9) Burns Howff Club of Dumfries ===
This club was formed in 1889 and joined the Robert Burns World Federation in 1899 as 'Number 112'. Meeting in the Globe Inn at Dumfries and named thus because this was Robert Burns' favourite Dumfries 'Howff' or pub. The club has had four active club members as Federation President and these have been M. Henry McKerrow (1937–1943), H. George McKerrow (1961), Provost Ernest Robertson (1974) and Albert Finlayson (1978). The club membership is restricted to 120 as its club room within the Globe Inn has restricted space. An extensive library of books relating to Burns and his contemporaries is also located at the Globe Inn and a number of Burns memorabilia and artefacts.

=== 10) Irvine Burns Club ===
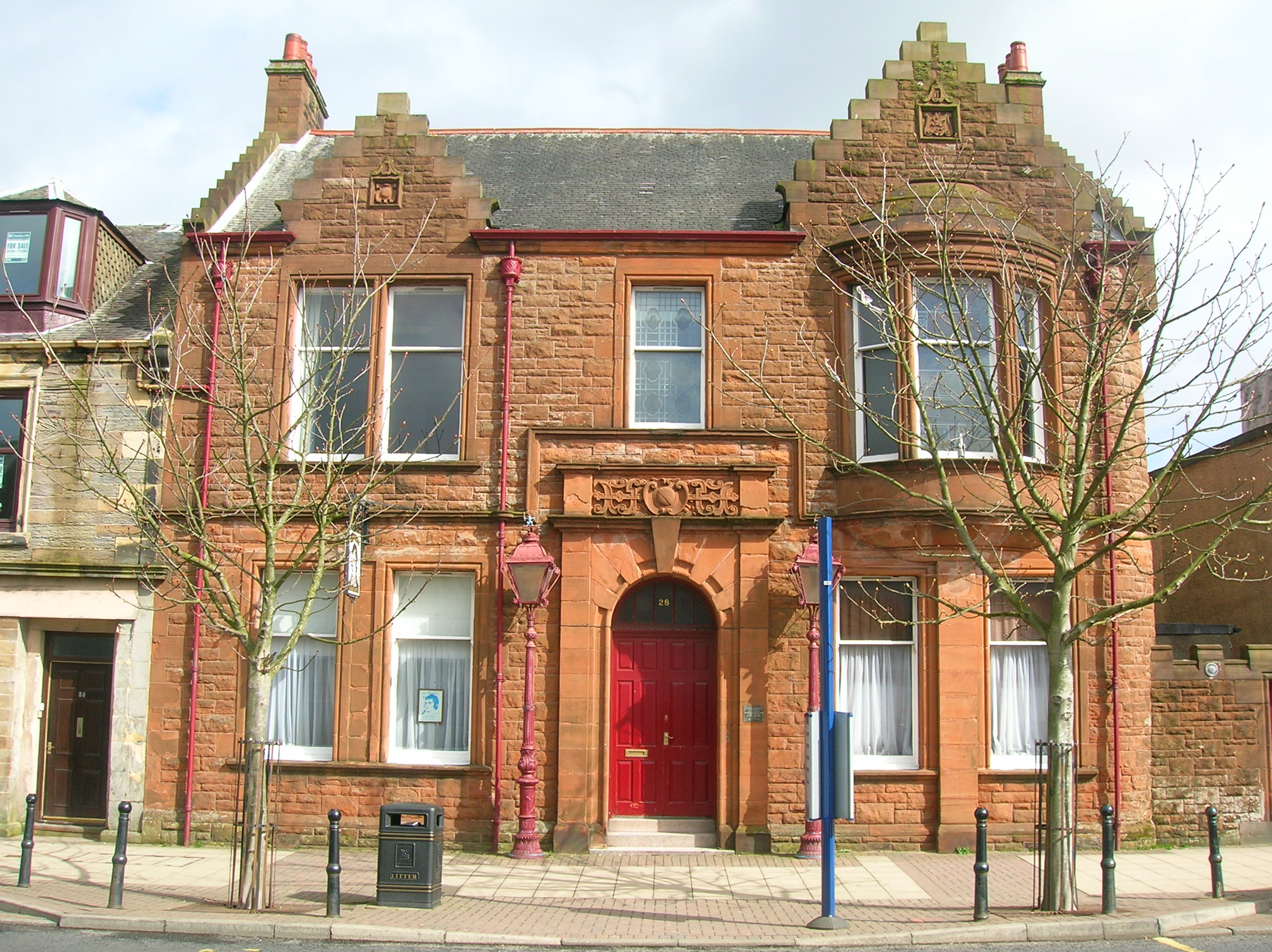
The 'Wellwood' premises of the Irvine Burns Club.

The Irvine Burns Club, originally formed in the Milne's Inn (now The Crown Inn) is now based in Wellwood House, Eglinton Street, and has an unbroken history dating back to 2 June 1826. The club had twelve founding members of whom five were known to Robert Burns, and two were once his close friends. The original minute of the meeting reads:

"The subscribers agree hereby to form, and do now form ourselves into a Committee for the purpose of establishing a Club, or Society for Commemorating the birth of Robert Burns the Ayrshire Poet - and we agree to meet at an early day to get the preliminaries of the Club properly arranged."

The document is signed by John Mackenzie, M.D.; David Sillar, Bailie; William Gillies, Grain Dealer; John Peebles, Convener of Trades; James Johnston, Town Clerk; Robert Wyllie, Harbour Master; John Orr, Merchant; James Allan, Merchant (grocer); Maxwell Dick, Bookseller; William Shields, Senior, Merchant; John Fletcher, Surgeon; and Patrick Blair, Writer.

Dr John Mackenzie, was the first club president. He had been a doctor in Mauchline, attended Burns' dying father at Lochlea in 1784 and married one of the "Mauchline Belles" before moving to Irvine in the capacity of personal physician to the Earl of Eglinton and his family. David Sillar, the first vice-president, had been a friend of Burns since his teenage years, was a member of the Tarbolton Bachelors Club, became a grocer, and finally an Irvine Council Bailie.

=== 11) Kilmarnock Number 'O' Burns Club ===
This club records that it was instituted in 1808 at the Angel Inn and the first president was D. Campbell of Skerrington. The club had several periods of dormancy from 1814 to 1841, 1844, 1849 to 1855, 1871 to 1877 and during the wars years of 1915 to 1919. President Brown of the 'Burns Club of London' helped establish the Robert Burns World Federation in 1885 and acquired the distinction of 'Number 1' for his club, resulting in the Kilmarnock Burns Club having the 'Number 0' appellation conferred upon it at the first minuted meeting at Kilmarnock. Duncan McNaught was a member of the same group that set up what was to become the Robert Burns World Federation and was a president of the club. The club was once known as the 'Mother Club,' and was recorded as such in the second, 1893 issue, of the 'Burns Chronicle and Club Directory.'

=== 12) Burns Club of London - Number 1 ===
The Burns Club of London was founded in 1868 by Colin Rae Brown, a native of Greenock and a past president of the Greenock Burns Club. He was a wealthy newspaper proprietor and was closely involved in the establishment of the Robert Burns World Federation based in Kilmarnock and as a result the club acquired the distinction of being 'Number 1' on the Federations list and the Kilmarnock Burns Club responded by acquiring the appellation of 'Number 0'. The club meets regularly at The Caledonian Club, Belgravia, London. On 25 January, Members and guests meet to lay a wreath at the Burns monument on Embankment, London. Special celebrations are being planned for the club's 150th anniversary in 2018, including publication of the club's history by past president, Dr Clark McGinn.

=== 13) Paisley Burns Club ===
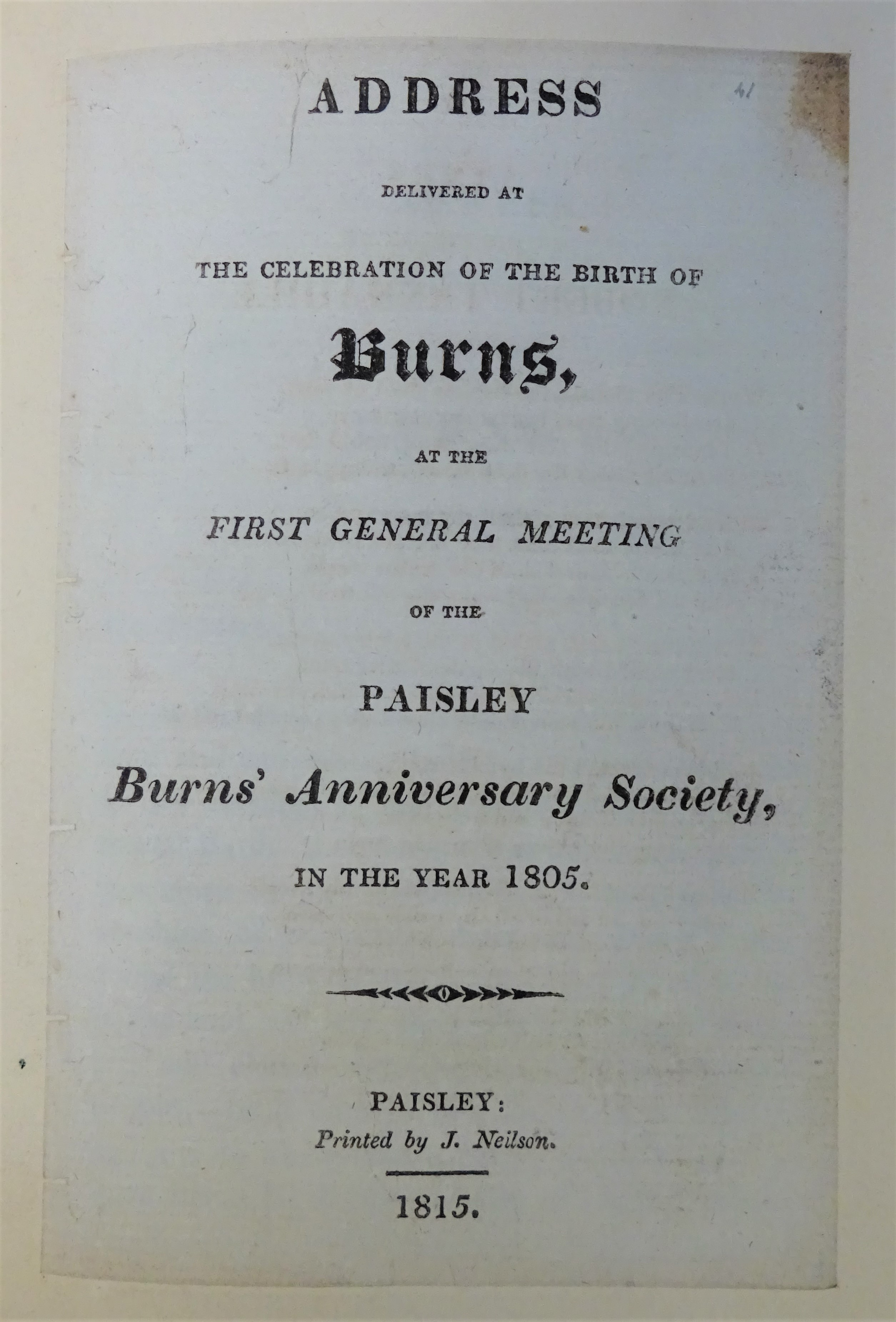
1805 Immortal Memory

This club was founded in 1805 and claims to be the world's oldest formally constituted Burns club, seemingly with the original name 'Paisley Burns' Anniversary Society'. It meets monthly during the winter in the cottage once owned by Robert Tannahill, Paisley's weaver poet and songwriter, founder and first secretary. The club owns its premises, donated to the Paisley Burns Club in 1933. Club membership is still all-male and is limited to 40. The club was in abeyance from 1836 to 1874.

=== 14) Dundee Burns Club ===
The Dundee Burns Club was founded in 1860, From 1877, the club was the driving force behind the erection of John Steell's statue to Robert Burns in Dundee's Albert Square. A silk banner commissioned for the unveiling of the statue in 1880 is now held by the McManus Gallery and was restored in 2012. The club has the distinction of having a specially-written pipe reel named after it, "The Dundee Burns Club", written by the celebrated Scots fiddler James Scott Skinner.

=== 15) Partick Burns Club ===
The Partick Burns Club was instituted in 1885 and has met to honour Robert Burns every January since then, with the exception of some years during the First and Second World Wars. The club was founded by the merchants, trades people and members of the Partick Burgh council and the club presidents up to 1912 (when Partick was incorporated into greater Glasgow) were almost uniquely the provosts of the burgh. Its annual supper normally has an attendance of approx. 130, with ages ranging from nineteen to ninety.

=== 16) Winnipeg Robert Burns Club ===
The Winnipeg Robert Burns Club was founded in 1907 and joined the Burns Federation in 1911 as #197 on the rolls and claims to be the "oldest continuously existing federated Burns Club outside the United Kingdom." The club was founded by a group of workers at the CPR Weston Shops in the west end of the city who had gotten together to hold a Burns Supper in January 1907, and other Scottish migrants, in the autumn of 1907. It erected a statue to Robert Burns, a replica of the George Lawson statue in Ayr, on the grounds of the Manitoba Legislature in 1936. It annually holds its Burns Supper on 25 January.

== Activities ==
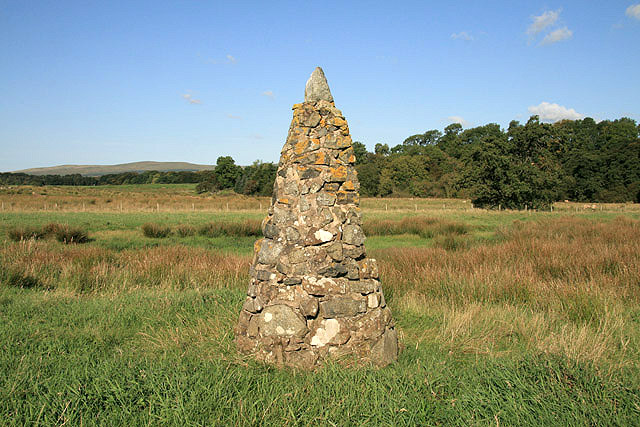
Memorial dedicated to John Lapraik (1727-1807) poet and friend Robert Burns, who lost his money with the collapse of the Ayr Bank and had to leave his farm. The inscription on the plaque reads: THIS CAIRN WAS ERECTED AD1914 BY THE LAPRIAK BURNS CLUB OF MUIRKIRK TO MARK THE SPOT WHERE STOOD THE HOUSE OF BAULD LAPRAIK THE FRIEND OF ROBERT BURNS THE POET BUT IF THE BEAST AND BRANKS BE SPARD TILL KYE BE GUAN WITHOUT THE HERD AN A THE VITTEL ON THE YARD AN THEEKIT RIGHT I MEAN YOUR INGLE-SIDE TO GUARD AE WINTER NIGHT

Apart from Burns suppers and involvement with school and club based Burns Competitions for young people clubs have inter-club nights and other social activities such as the Professor Ross Roy Quiz Night held by the Ayrshire Association of Burns Clubs.

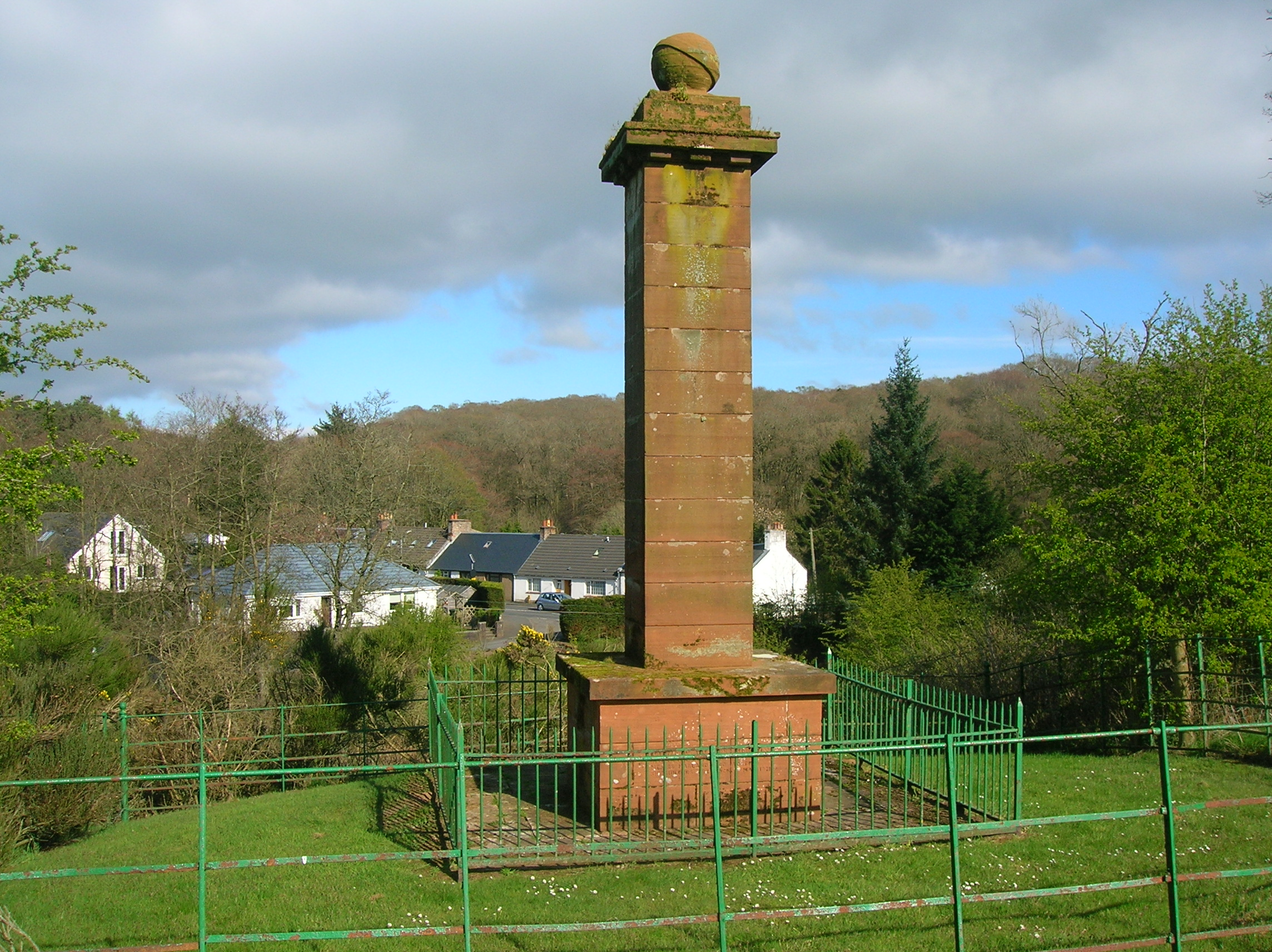
Robert Burns and Highland Mary Memorial

Local clubs and the Robert Burns World Federation also help to maintain various Robert Burns linked sites such as the 'Trysting Tree' of Robert Burns's poem The Soldier's Return at Millmannoch and the Highland Mary and Robert Burns Memorial at Failford, both in Ayrshire.

Clubs also raise money for charitable purposes, hold lectures, carry out original research, have ladies or Jean Armour Nights, St Andrew's Nights, Hallowe'en Nights, Annual Excursions and take part in specific local events such as the 'Marymass Events' held at Irvine.

Every year the Southern Scottish Counties Burns Association organises a service at the Brow Well to commemorate the death of Robert Burns who died four days after his visit to the Brow Well on 21 July 1796.

The 'Burns Chronicle' first published by the Robert Burns World Federation in 1891 acts as a record of clubs and their activities with Burns related articles contributed by members with special editions being occasionally issued for events such as the 2009 'Homecoming'.

== Links with the Freemasons ==
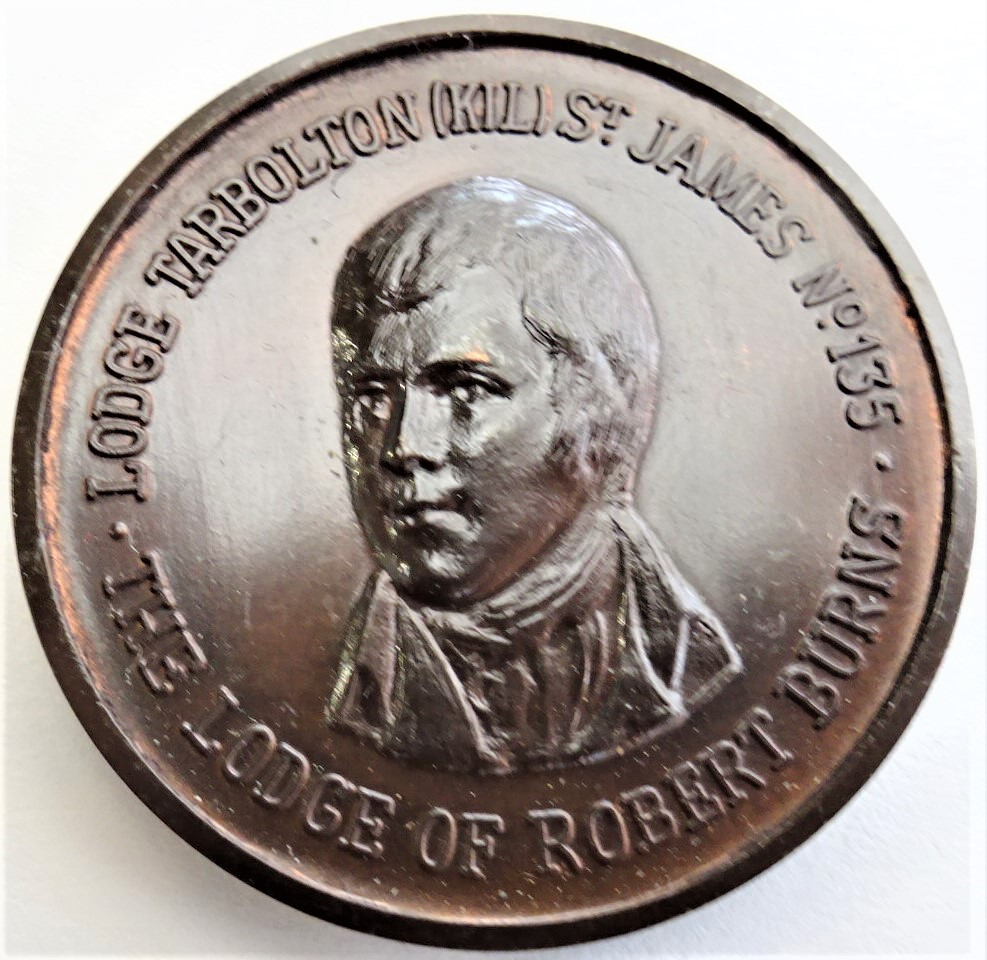
Masonic Penny from Lodge St James.

Robert Burns was initiated in Lodge St. David, Tarbolton in 1781, at the age of 23. Burns was elected "Depute Master" of the Lodge St. James at the age of 25. At a meeting of Lodge St. Andrew in Edinburgh in 1787 Burns was toasted by the Worshipful Grand Master. In February 1787, Burns was made the Poet Laureate of Lodge Canongate Kilwinning No. 2, Edinburgh. Burns was exalted a companion in the Holy Royal Arch Degree in 1787 at St. Ebbe's Lodge, Eyemouth. The companions even agreed to admit Burns without paying the necessary fees. When Burns moved to Dumfries, he joined Lodge St. Andrew in 1788. In 1792, he was elected Senior Warden. A strong link with Freemasonary is a feature of a number of Burns clubs.

== See also ==
- Brow, Dumfries and Galloway
- Drukken Steps
- Ellisland Farm, Dumfries
- Friar's Carse
- Robert Burns and the Eglinton Estate
- Robert Burns' diamond point engravings
- Robert Burns World Federation
