= John McKinney =

John McKinney is the name of:

- John F. McKinney (1827–1903), American politician, representative from Ohio
- John P. McKinney (born 1964), Connecticut State Senator
- John R. McKinney (1921–1997), American World War II soldier awarded the Medal of Honor
- John T. McKinney (1785–1837), Indiana Supreme Court judge
- John McKinney (Florida judge) (1829–1871), United States federal judge
- John McKinney (Michigan politician) (1803–1870), Michigan Secretary of State and Treasurer
- John McKinney, winner of the 19th Scripps National Spelling Bee in 1946

== See also ==
- Jack McKinney (disambiguation)
- John Trey McKenney (born 2006), American college basketball player
