= Jock McKenzie =

Jock McKenzie may refer to:

- Jock McKenzie (Australian footballer) (1911–1989), Australian rules footballer
- Jock McKenzie (rugby union, born 1892) (1892–1968), New Zealand rugby union player
- Jock McKenzie (sportsperson, born 2001), New Zealand rugby union player

== See also ==
- Jock Mackenzie (1892–?), Scottish footballer
- Jock MacKenzie (1885–?), Scottish footballer
