= Canadian Magazine =

Canadian literary journal

The Canadian Magazine of Politics, Science, Art and Literature was the premiere monthly literary journal of Anglophone Canada for three decades.

== History and profile ==
Edited first by James Gordon Mowat then by John Alexander Cooper, the first issue was printed in 1893. Its president was James Colebrooke Patterson, concurrently federal Minister of Militia and Defence, while one of its vice-presidents was Thomas Ballantyne, then Speaker of the Ontario legislature. It was meant to compete with the American offerings of Scribner's and Harper's, and was similarly priced, but focused on "cultivating Canadian patriotism and Canadian interests." In 1897, the Magazine purchased Massey's Magazine thereby doubling its subscription. Advertisers were railway companies, banks, insurance companies, schools and colleges, brand-name dry goods and liquor producers. Eventually, its publisher would compete against the print cartel run by Hugh Cameron MacLean and William Southam. It reached a circulation of 30,000 subscribers in 1922. In 1925 the circulation of the magazine was 12,604 copies.

The journal featured writers including Stephen Leacock, George Monro Grant, Kate Eva Westlake and Goldwin Smith. Samuel Simonski reported from the front of the Boer War, while John Joseph Mackenzie wrote a layman's guide to bacteria and James Wilberforce Longley wrote articles on Nova Scotian orchards.

Canadian Magazine ended publication in 1938.
