= Kate Eva Westlake =

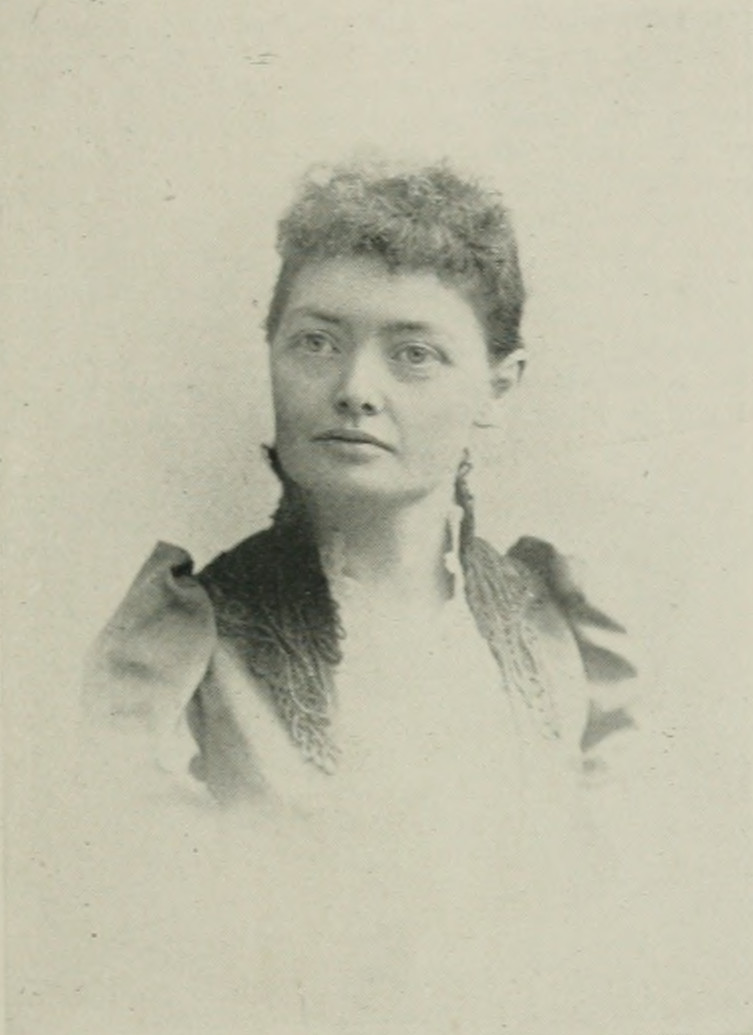
- "A Woman of the Century"
- Born: 1856; Ingersoll, Canada West
- Died: 4 March 1906 (aged 49–50); London
- Occupation: writer
- Spouse: Frank Yeigh (m. 1892)

Kate Eva Westlake (after marriage, Yeigh; pen name, Aunt Polly Wolly; 1856 – 4 March 1906) was a Canadian writer and an early editor.

== Life ==
Westlake was born in Ingersoll, Canada West. The family moved to London, Ontario, where her father succeeded in business. One of her first published works was a serial western story titled "Stranger Than Fiction", published in a magazine. She became a sub-editor of the newly formed St. Thomas Journal, replacing her brother who died in 1881 at the age of 27.

She was given the editorship of the Fireside Weekly, a family story paper published in Toronto. She sometimes signed her work "Aunt Polly Wogg". She was a Baptist and a Liberal. In 1891 a very successful book, Sitting Bull's White Ward, was published exploiting the death of Sitting Bull the year before. Westlake is believed to be its anonymous author.

In 1892, she married Frank Yeigh, an author.

She wrote for Canadian Magazine. In 1906, she published A Specimen Spinster which was her only book in her name. The book was about the views on life of Aunt Polly Wolly.

Westlake died in London, Ontario in 1906.
