= Jack McKenzie =

Jack McKenzie, MacKenzie or Mackenzie may refer to:

- Jack Mackenzie (1888–1984), Canadian civil engineer and academic
- Jack MacKenzie (cinematographer) (1892–1979), British cinematographer
- Jack McKenzie (actor) (born 1942), Scottish actor
- Jack MacKenzie (footballer, born 2000), Scottish footballer (Aberdeen FC)
- Jack McKenzie (footballer, born 1881) (1881–1946), Australian rules footballer, known as 'Dookie'
- Jack McKenzie (footballer, born 1908) (1908–?), Australian rules footballer, son of 'Dookie'
- Jack McKenzie (ice hockey) (born 1930), Canadian ice hockey player

== See also ==
- John Mackenzie (disambiguation)
- John McKenzie (disambiguation)
- Jack McKinney (disambiguation)
