= Jack McKinney =

Jack McKinney may refer to:

- Jack McKinney (writer), pseudonym used by American authors James Luceno and Brian Daley
- Jack McKinney (basketball) (1935–2018), American basketball coach

== See also ==
- John McKinney (disambiguation)
- Jack McKenzie (disambiguation)
- Jack Kinney (1909–1992), American animator
