= Richard Brown (captain) =

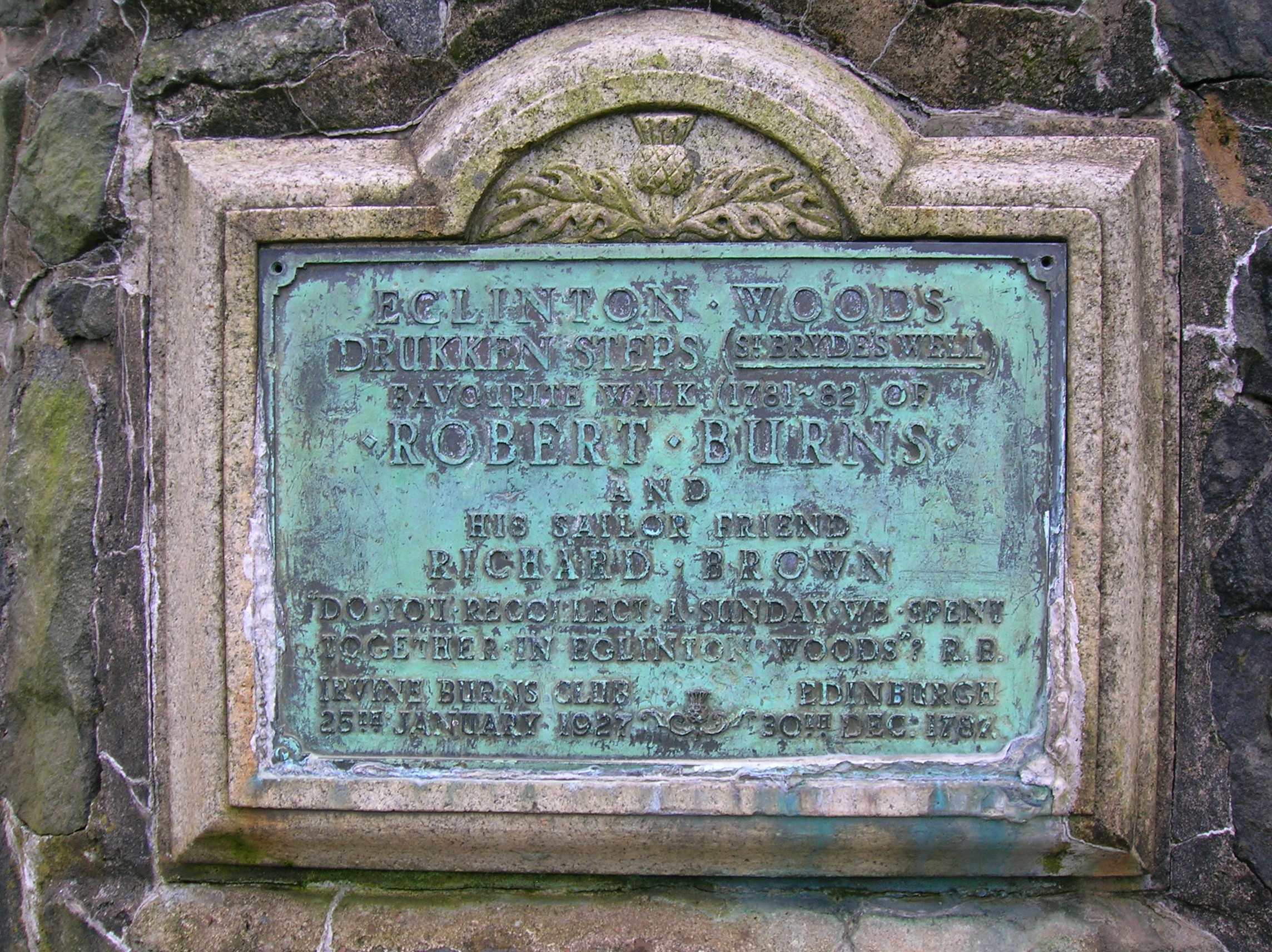
- The plaque from the Drukken Steps cairn
- Born: 2 June 1753; Irvine, Scotland
- Died: 1833 (aged 79–80); Port Glasgow, Scotland
- Occupation: Sea Captain or shipmaster

Richard Brown (1753 – 1833) or Ritchie Broun in Scots was born in Irvine. He was a sea captain and a one time friend of Robert Burns who is credited by Burns as the being the person who "encouraged me to endeavour at the character of a Poet."

== Life and character ==
Richard Brown was born in Irvine, the son of a 'plain mechanic' named William Brown and his wife Jane Whinie. Richard had a wealthy patron who gave him a good education, but the patron died, dashing Brown's chances of bettering his situation in life. He went to sea, where after many ups and downs he ending up being robbed by an American privateer on the wild coast of Connaught. He had fought for the liberty of the Americans against the British, and the American struggle for freedom, obvious in the poet's early poems; the poet's sympathy for the colonists can at least in part be attributed to Brown. Later he became captain of a large West Indiaman, the Mary & Jean, belonging to the Thames and sailing to such destinations as Grenada in the southeastern Caribbean Sea.

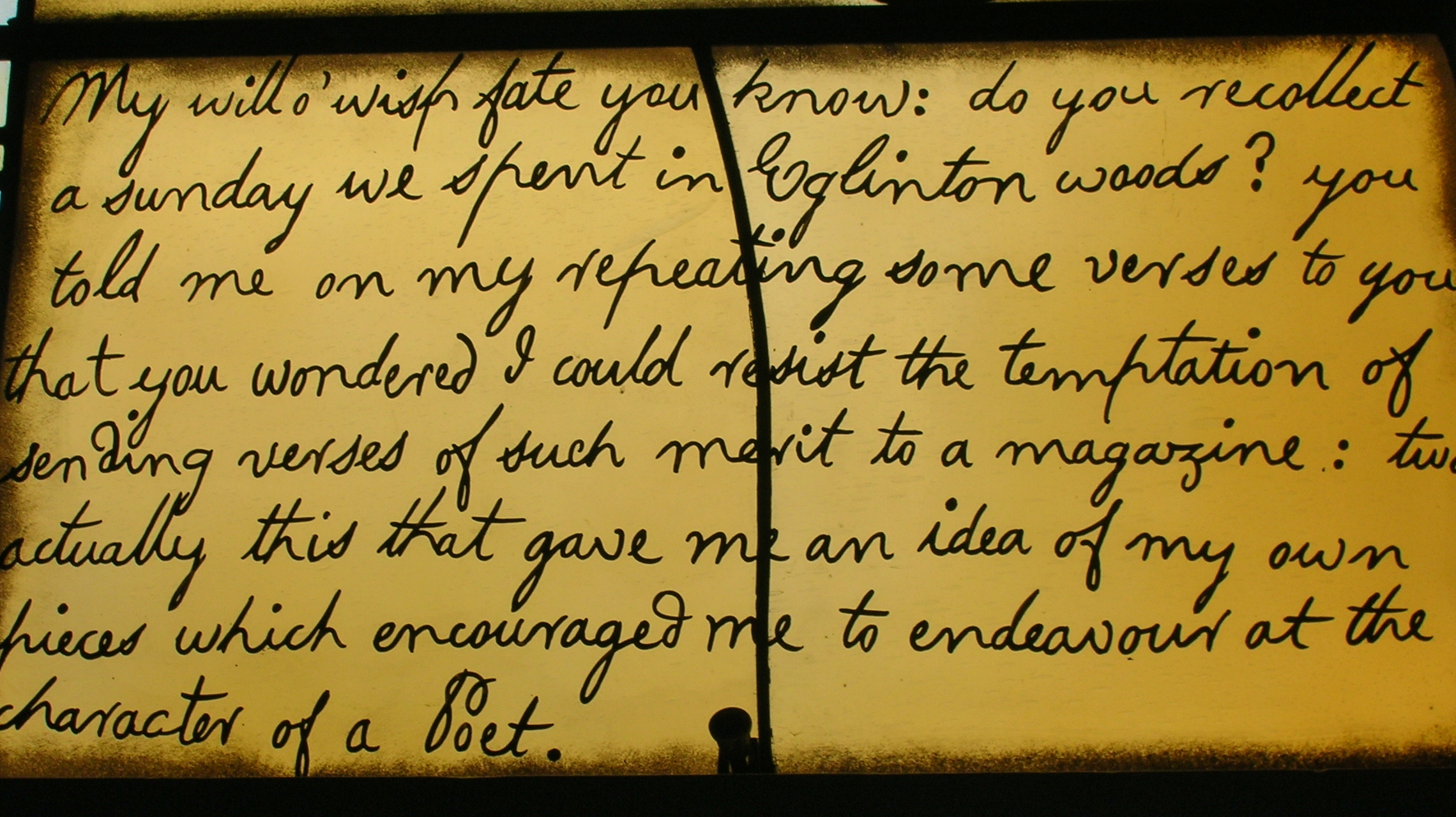
A Sunday in Eglinton Woods.

Burns describes him as "This gentleman's mind was fraught with courage, independence, magnanimity, and every noble manly virtue." Other views of Richard Brown was less charitable, such as: "That moral leper who spoke of illicit love with all the levity of a sailor". Gilbert Burns says of Robert's days in Irvine that he here "contracted some acquaintances of a freer manner of thinking and living than he had been used to, whose society prepared him for overleaping the bounds of rigid virtue, which had hitherto restrained him". Robert himself stated that Brown's views on illicit love "did me a mischief".

Richard Brown married Helen or Eleanora Blair, daughter of David Blair (b.1736) and Ann Muir of Girtridge Mill in Dundonald Parish, on 30 May 1785, and settled in Port Glasgow. The couple had six children, named Jean (christened 24 February 1786 in Dundonald parish), Anne (chr. 5 September 1788 at Girtrigg), William (5 August 1790), Eleonora (11 August 1792), Alexander (13 June 1796, to "Richard Brown Shipmaster in Port Glasgow and Helen Blair his spouse"), and David (28 August 1799), the last four all christened at Port Glasgow.

In later life, Richard Brown became very respectable, and, although he is said by some to have quarrelled violently with Burns, the reason remains unknown as the poet's allegations that he had taught Burns the art of seduction were not published until four years after his death. When living at Port Glasgow he was noted to be interested in education and religion, with a hospitable, kind and generous nature. He was also keen on shooting.

== Association with Robert Burns ==
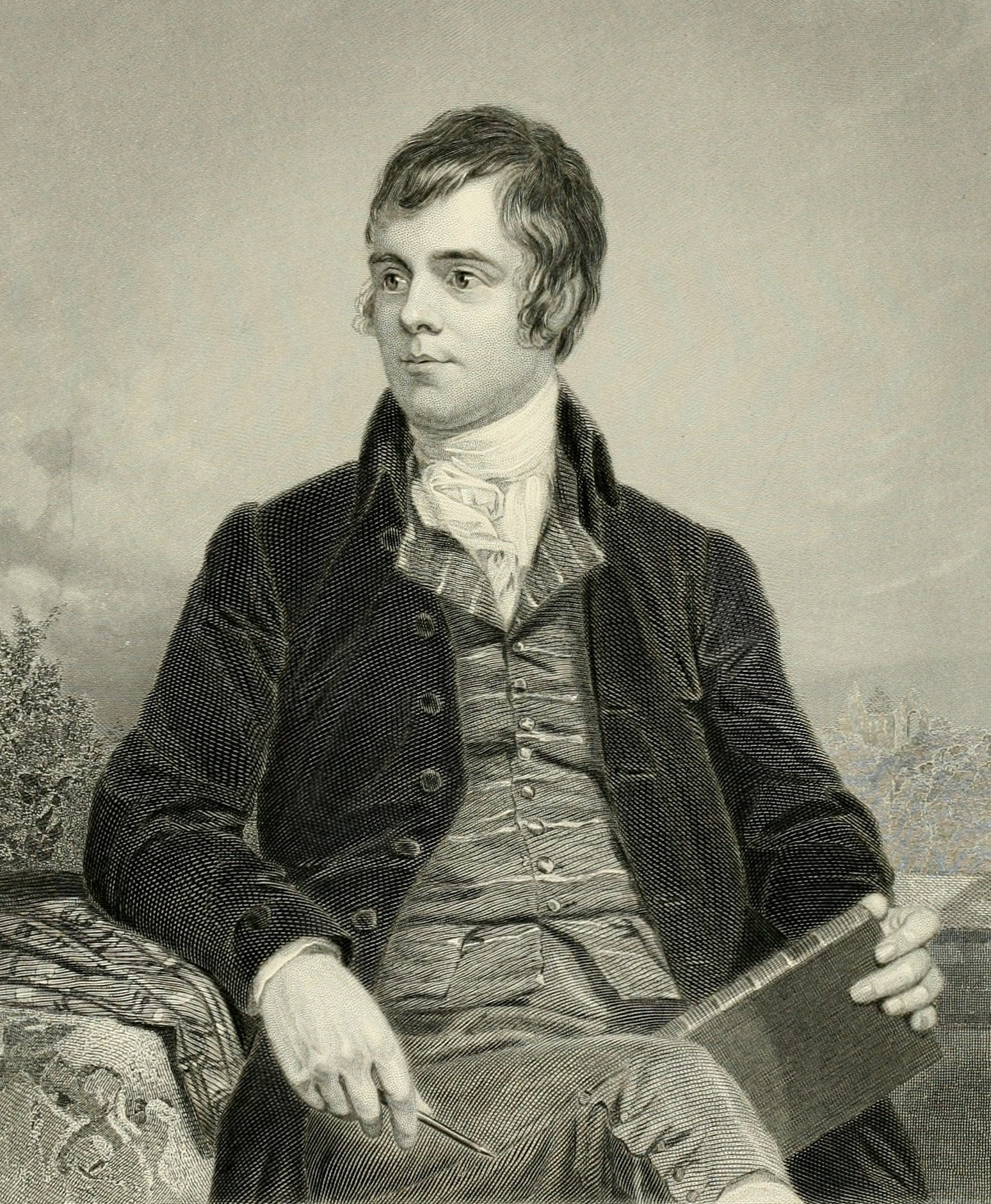
Robert Burns by Alexander Nasmyth, 1787

Robert Burns lived in Irvine during the years 1781–1782, at the age of 23, (1759–1796) for a period of around 9 months, whilst learning the craft of flax-dressing from his mother's half-brother, Alexander Peacock, working at the heckling shop in the Glasgow Vennel. During this time he made a number of acquaintances, befriended several locals and in particular struck up a lasting friendship with Richard Brown, with whom he took regular walks into the Eglinton Woods via the old Irvine-to-Kilwinning toll road and the Drukken or Drucken (Drunken) Steps over the Red Burn and back via the site of Saint Brides or Bryde's Well at Stanecastle.

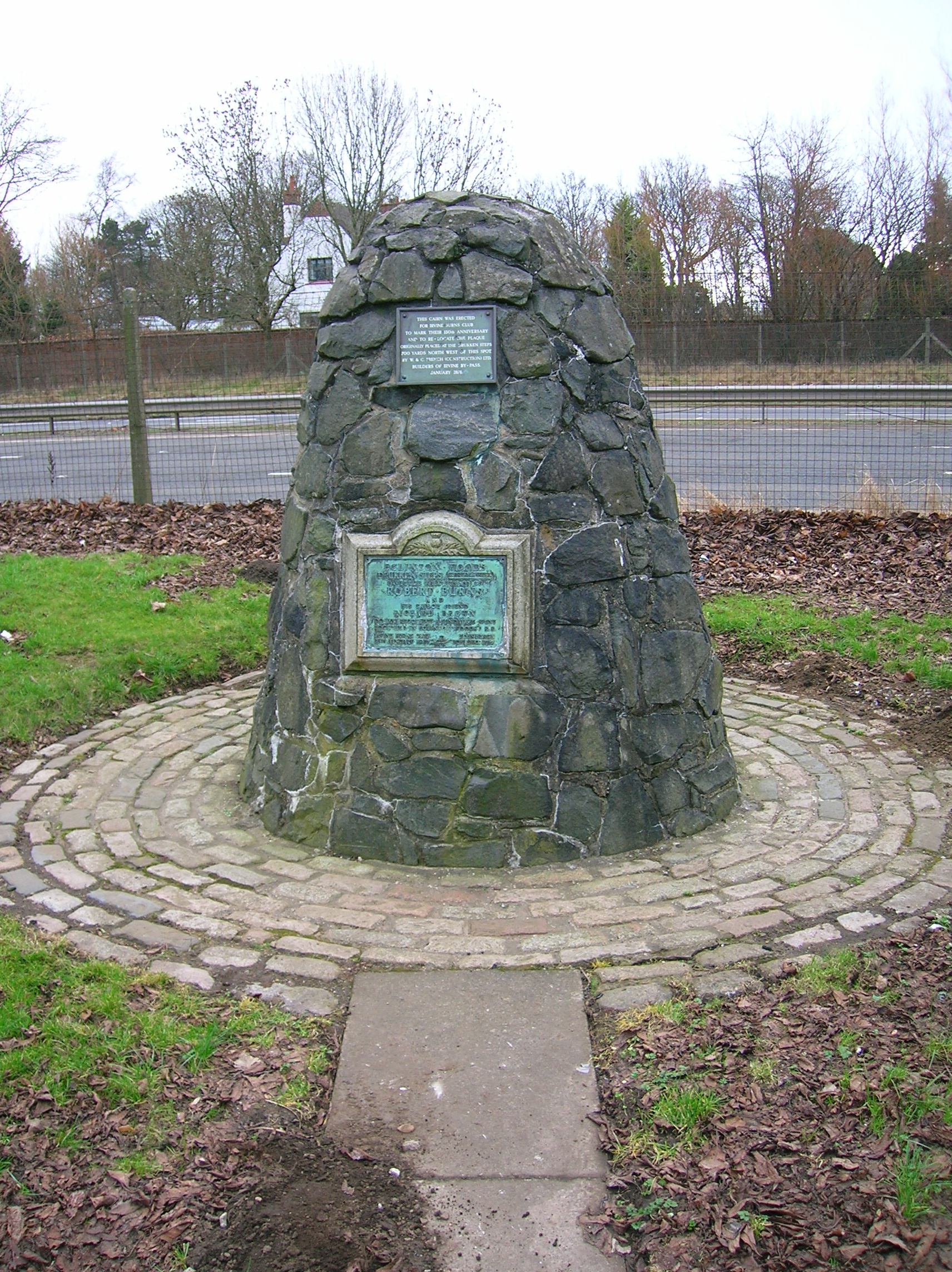
The cairn commemorating the association of Richard Brown and Robert Burns in Irvine.

In his Autobiographical Letter to Dr Hunter, Burns says of this intimate friendship: "I formed a bosom friendship with a young fellow, the first created being I had ever seen, but a hapless son of misfortune." "I loved him, I admired him to a degree of enthusiasm; and I strove to imitate him. In some measure I succeeded: I had the pride before, but he taught it to flow in proper channels. His knowledge of the world was vastly superiour to mine, and I was all attention to learn. He was the only man I ever saw who was a greater fool than myself when WOMAN was the presiding star; but he spoke of a certain fashionable failing with levity, which hitherto I had regarded with horror. Here his friendship did me a mischief, and the consequence was, that soon after I resumed the plough."

Upon hearing of this, Richard Brown is said to have commented that:"Illicit love! Levity of a sailor! When I first knew Burns he had nothing to learn in that respect." The now married Brown, settled with children and respectable members of society in Port Glasgow, took Burns's comments regarding womanising very badly and this resulted in an enmity that lasted until Burns's death. Mackay and others however point out that the letter that made the insinuations was not published until 1800, four years after Burns' death and whatever the cause of the death of their friendship was, it was not this.

On 30 December 1787, Burns wrote to Brown saying: "Do you recollect a Sunday we spent in Eglinton woods? You told me, on my repeating some verses to you, that you wondered I could resist the temptation of sending verses of such merit to a magazine: 'twas actually this that gave me an idea of my own pieces which encouraged me to endeavour at the character of a Poet." Adding that : "Almighty Love still "reigns and revels" in my bosom; and I am at this moment ready to hang myself for a young Edinr. Widow." The widow, as he puts it, was Clarinda. This letter provides clues as to when Burns's regular marriage to Jean Armour took place.

On 21 May 1789 Burns wrote to Brown from Mauchline saying: "wishing you would always set me down as your bosom friend – wishing you long life and prosperity and that every good thing may attend you – wishing Mrs Brown and your little ones as few of the evils of this world as is consistent with humanity ... wishing that if there is to be another state of existence, Mrs Brown, Mrs Burns, our little ones in both families, and you and I in some snug paradisical retreat, may make a jovial Party to all eternity! ... Farewell, God bless you! my long-loved, dearest friend!!!!"

Richard Brown received from Burns one of the few signed presentation copies of the Kilmarnock Edition, the other two being given to Peggy Thompson, and James Burnes, a cousin. It was not destroyed by the family, being found hidden in a sideboard from Richard Brown's household after the captain's death.

=== The route of the old Toll Road ===
The old Toll Road used by Richard Brown and Robert Burns in their walk through the Eglinton Woods was later diverted by the Earl of Eglinton, however it remained as a route within the earl's "Pleasure Grounds".

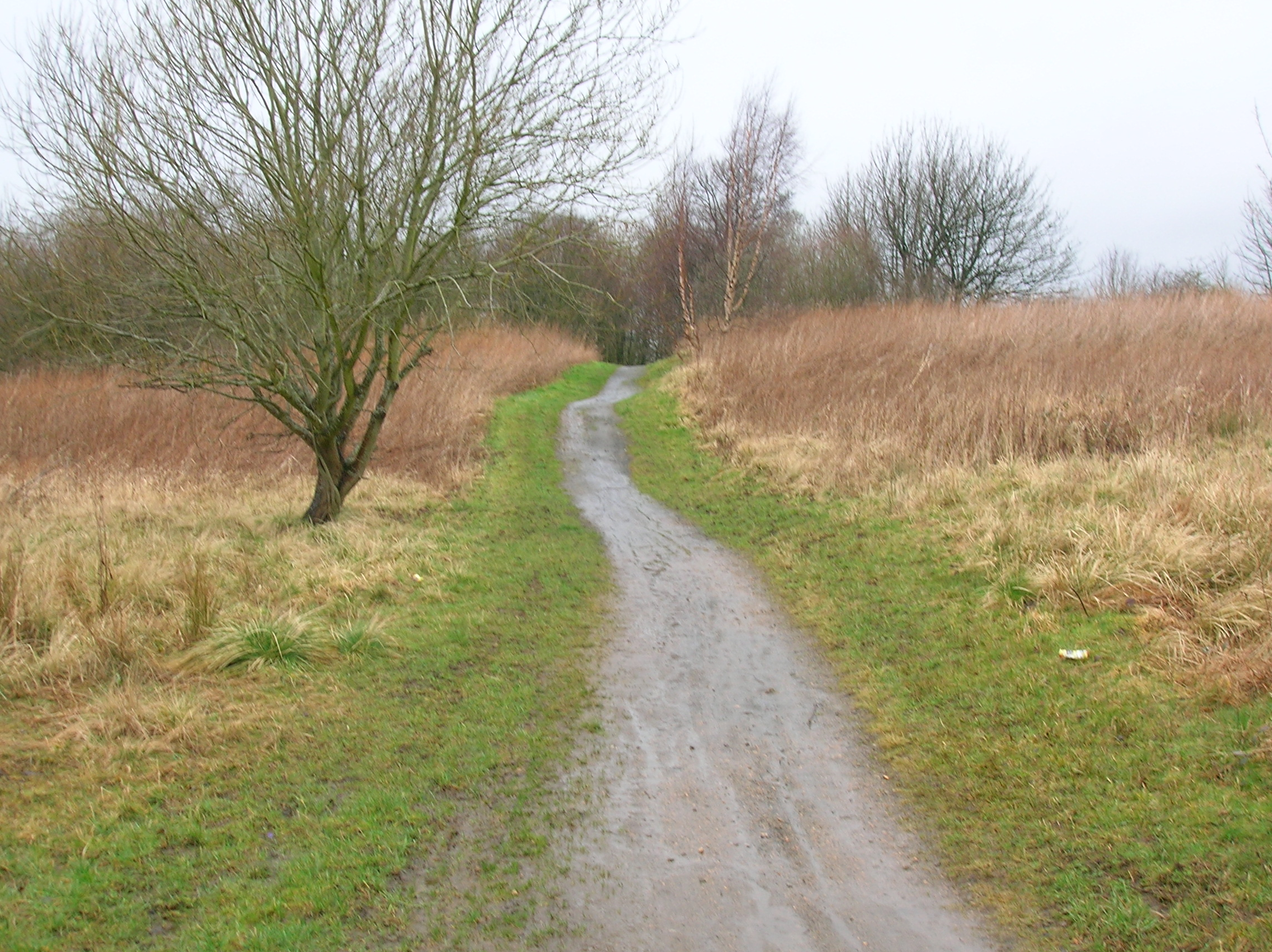
The old 1774 toll road up to the Higgins House from the old Long Drive.

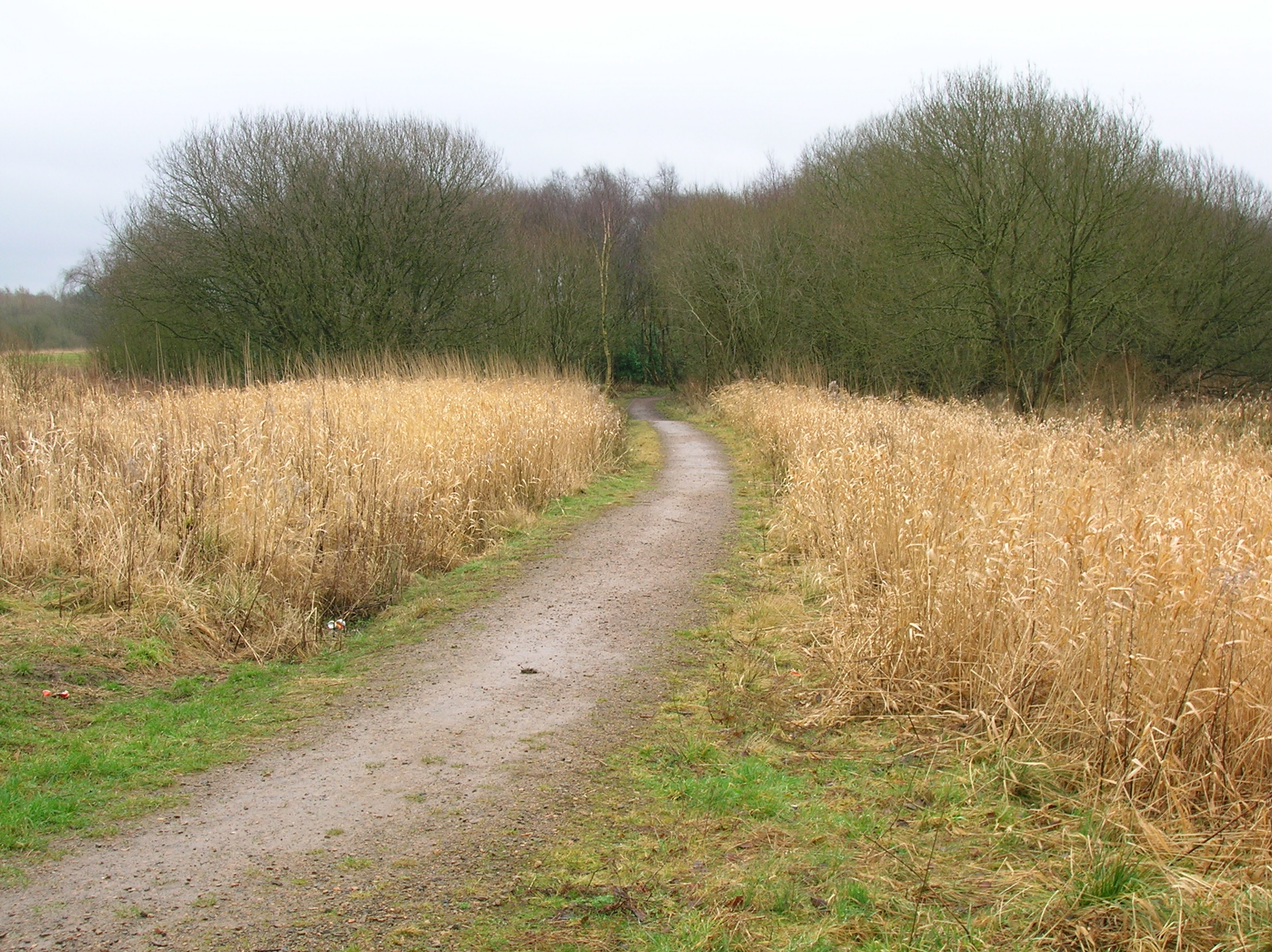
The old 1774 Toll Road looking towards the Drukken Steps from the old Long Drive.

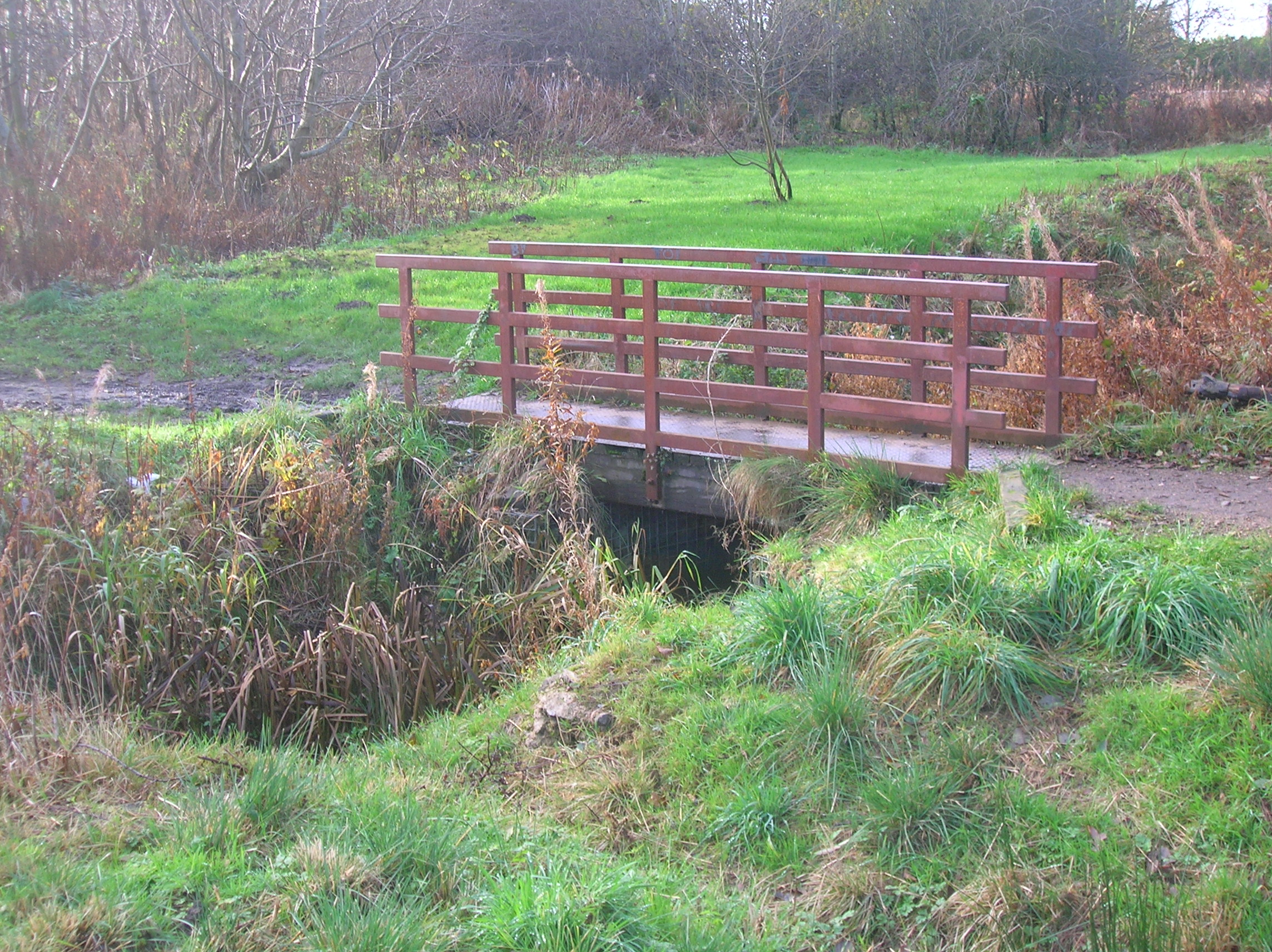
The site of the Drukken Steps.

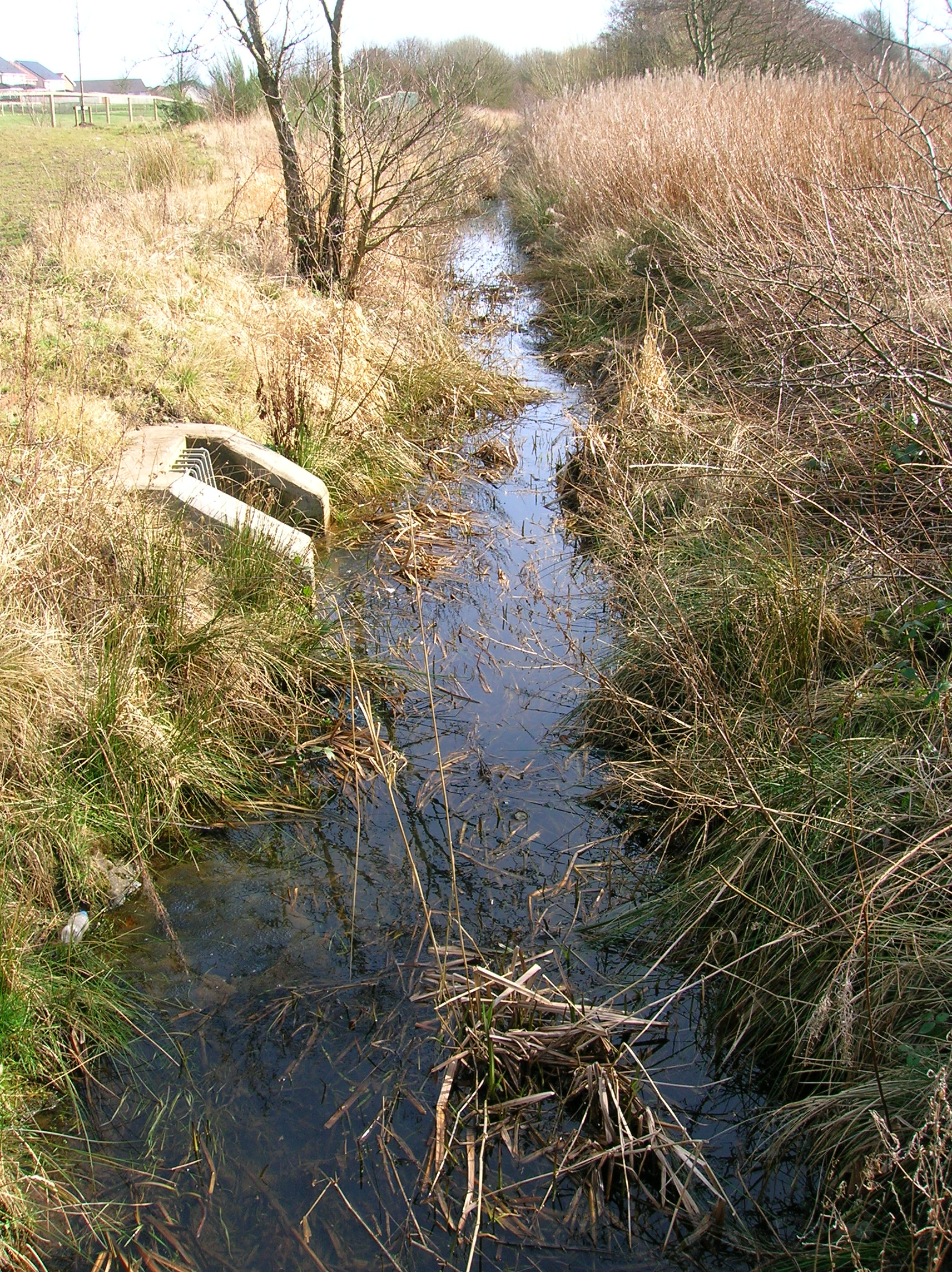
The Red Burn in 2009 near the site of the Drukken Steps.

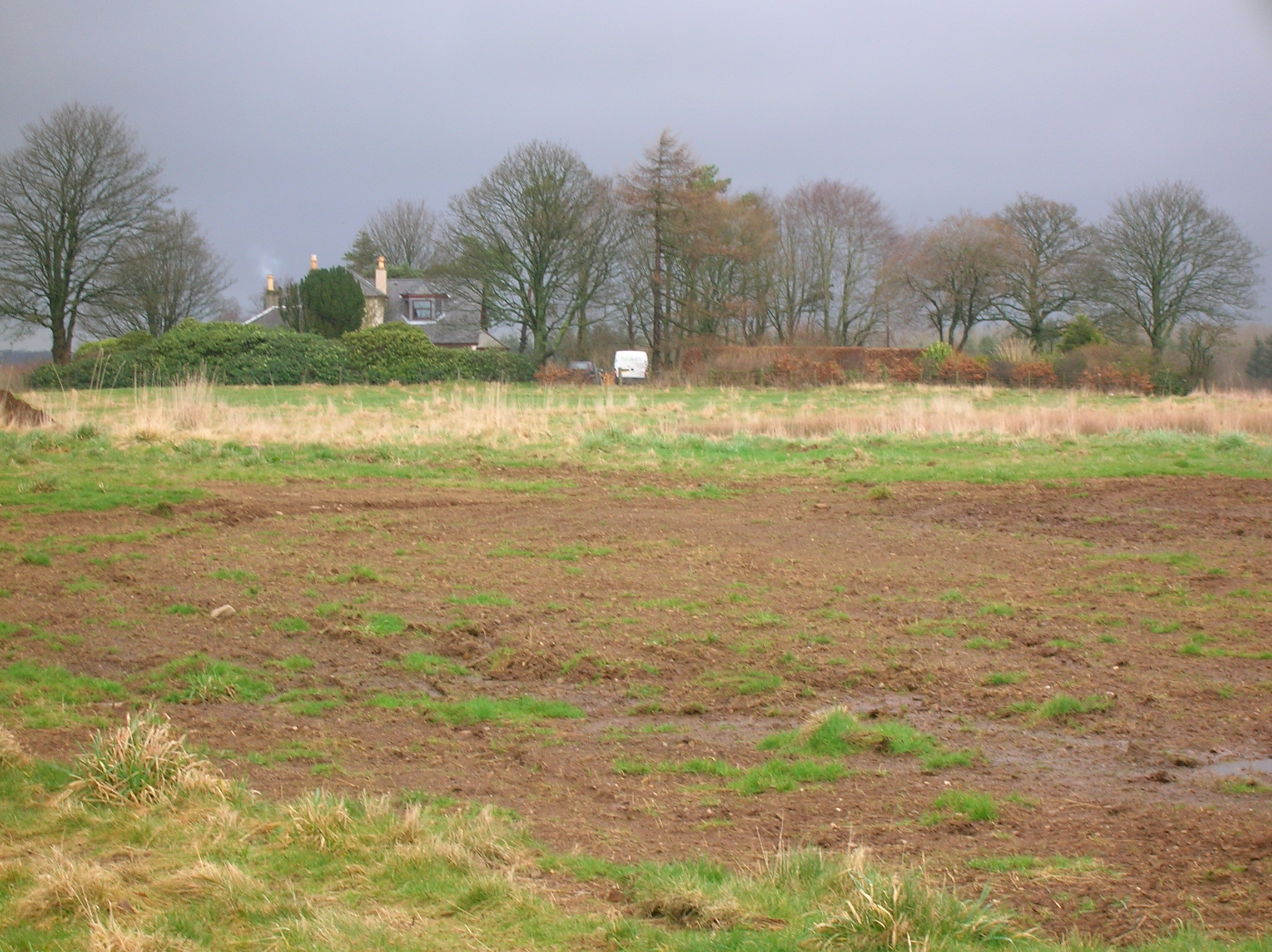
Gravel Cottage (now Morven Lodge) on the old 1774 toll road close to Higgins House.

== Other letters between Brown and Burns ==
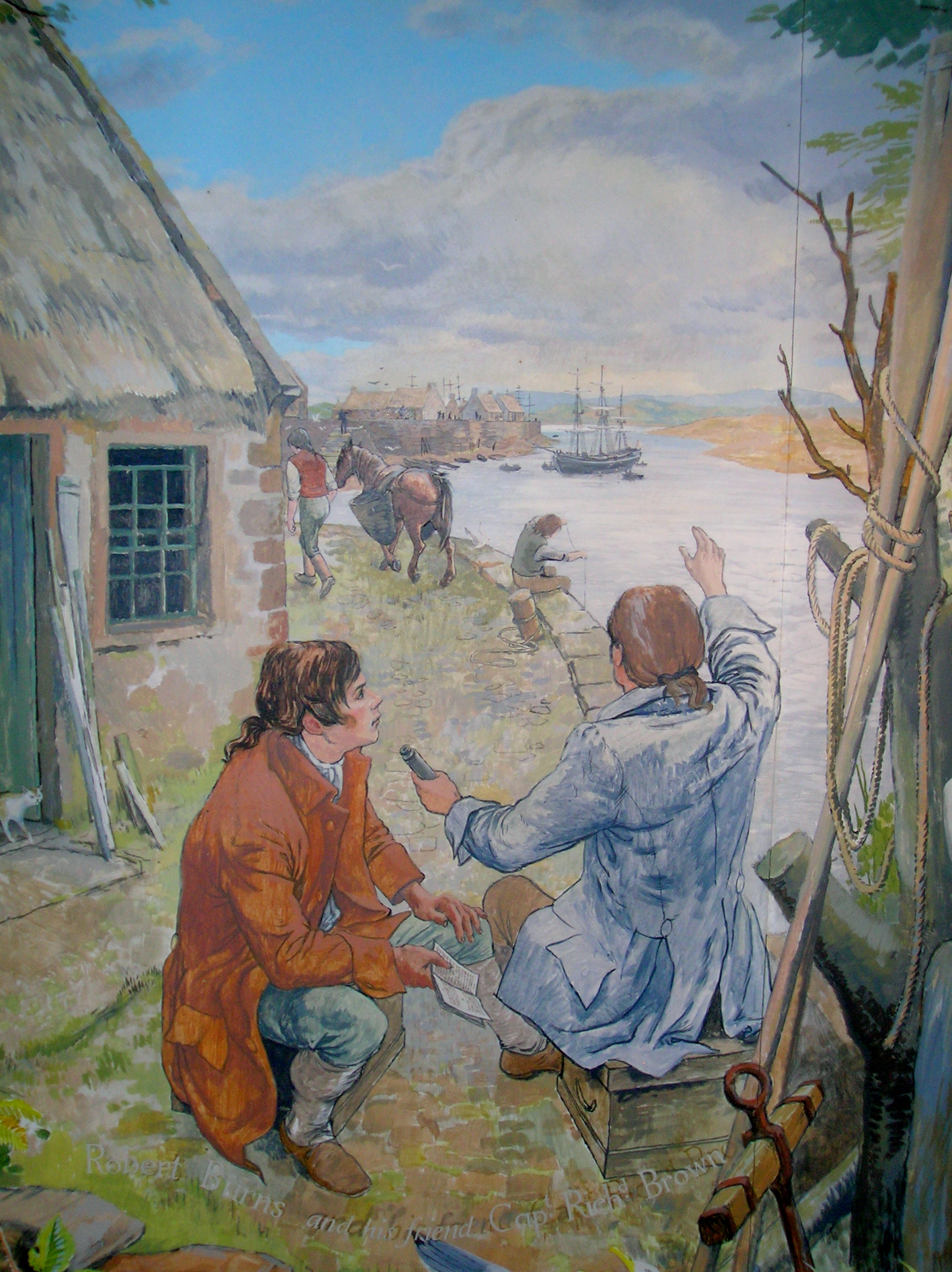
Robert Burns and Richard Brown at Irvine Harbour.

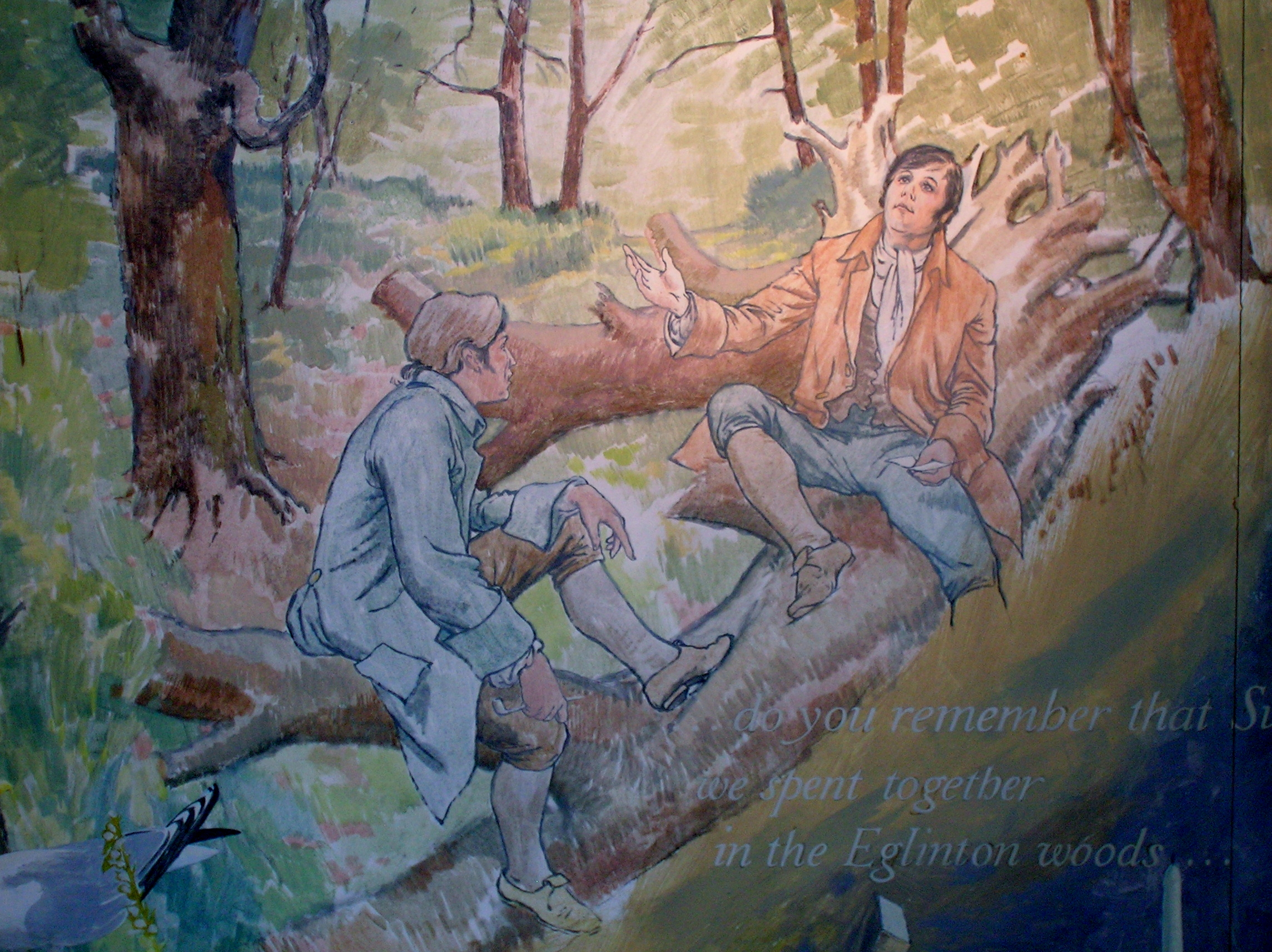
Robert Burns and Richard Brown in Eglinton Woods.

On 15 February 1788 Burns wrote to Richard, saying I shall arrive at Glasgow on Monday evening, and beg if possible, you will meet me on Tuesday: I shall wait you Tuesday all day − I shall be found at Durie's Black Bull Inn − I am hurried as if hunted by fifty devils, else I would come to Greenock: but if you cannot possibly come, write me, if possible, to Glasgow

On 24 February Burns writes from Mossgiel that I arrived here, at my brother's, only yesterday; after fighting my way thro' Paisley and Kilmarnock against those old powerful foes of mine, the Devil, the World, and the Flesh; so terrible in the fields of Dissipation − I have met with few incidents in my life which give me so much pleasure as meeting you in Glasgow. --- There is time of life beyond which, we cannot form a tie the worth of friendship.

In a letter written in answer to correspondence from Richard Brown of 28 February 1788, Burns, then at Mauchline, relates to his "Dear friend", in March 1788, how he found Jean, on his return from Edinburgh, pregnant by him for a second time, and cast out by her family: I found Jean – with her cargo very well laid in; but unfortunately moor'd almost at the mercy of the wind and tide: I have towed her into convenient harbour where she may lie snug till she unload; and have taken the command myself – not ostensibly, but for a time, in secret.

On 4 November 1789, in a two-page letter Burns acknowledges and welcomes Brown's news. Then he explains his new job with the Excise and goes on to reflect on their long friendship and invites Brown and his wife to visit him at Ellisland. Burns goes on to explain that he cannot travel to meet Brown anywhere on account of his Excise duties and encourages Brown to come and visit him. Reflecting on their earlier association and now being the "earliest friend" apart from family "I now have on earth". He suggests when they meet they drink a toast and hopes "may the Companions of our Youth be the Friends of our Old Age".

== Micro-history ==
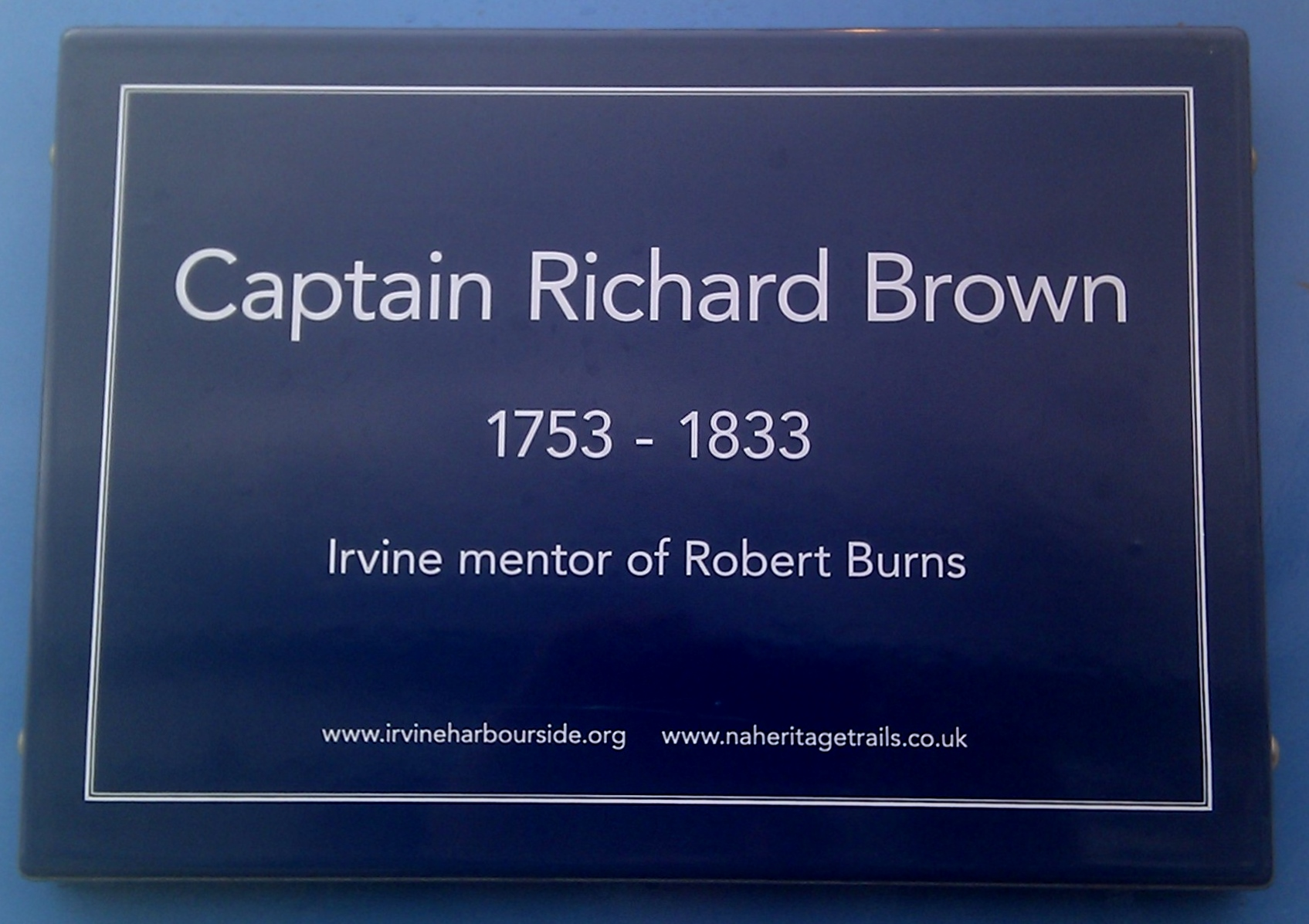
Plaque to Richard Brown at Irvine Harbour

In 2013 the Irvine Burns Club and partners established an 'Irvine Harbour Heritage Trail' honouring twelve significant individuals closely associated with the harbour and Richard Brown was honoured with a plaque.

On 18 February 1788 Burns wrote to Agnes Maclehose having just met with his brother William Burns and Richard Brown, saying "I have just met with my old friend, the ship captain; guess my pleasure; to meet you could alone have given me more. --- My brother William too, the young Saddler, has come to Glasgow to meet me, and here we three spending the evening. --"

In his semi-fictional book, "The Memorables of Robin Cummell", John Service records that Richard Brown, Keelivine (a lawyer), Robin Cummel, and Tammy Struggles (a nickname) at the Wheatsheaf Inn in Irvine's High Street. The name 'Keelivine' means 'Lead pencil' in Lallans, an appropriate sobriquet for a lawyer's clerk.

Thomas Crawford of Cartsburn was a Greenock-based friend of Richard Brown and Robert Burns.

Richard Brown was a member of the Masonic Lodge Irvine Saint Andrew Number 149. John Mackenzie was also a member.

Richard was one of the members of the Greenock Burns Club as far back as 1801.

== See also ==
- Jean Armour
- Alison Begbie
- Nelly Kilpatrick
- Agnes Maclehose
- Peggy Thompson
- Jenny Clow
- Irvine Harbour
- Robert Burns World Federation
