= Robert Burns World Federation =

Association which celebrates Robert Burns and Scottish literature

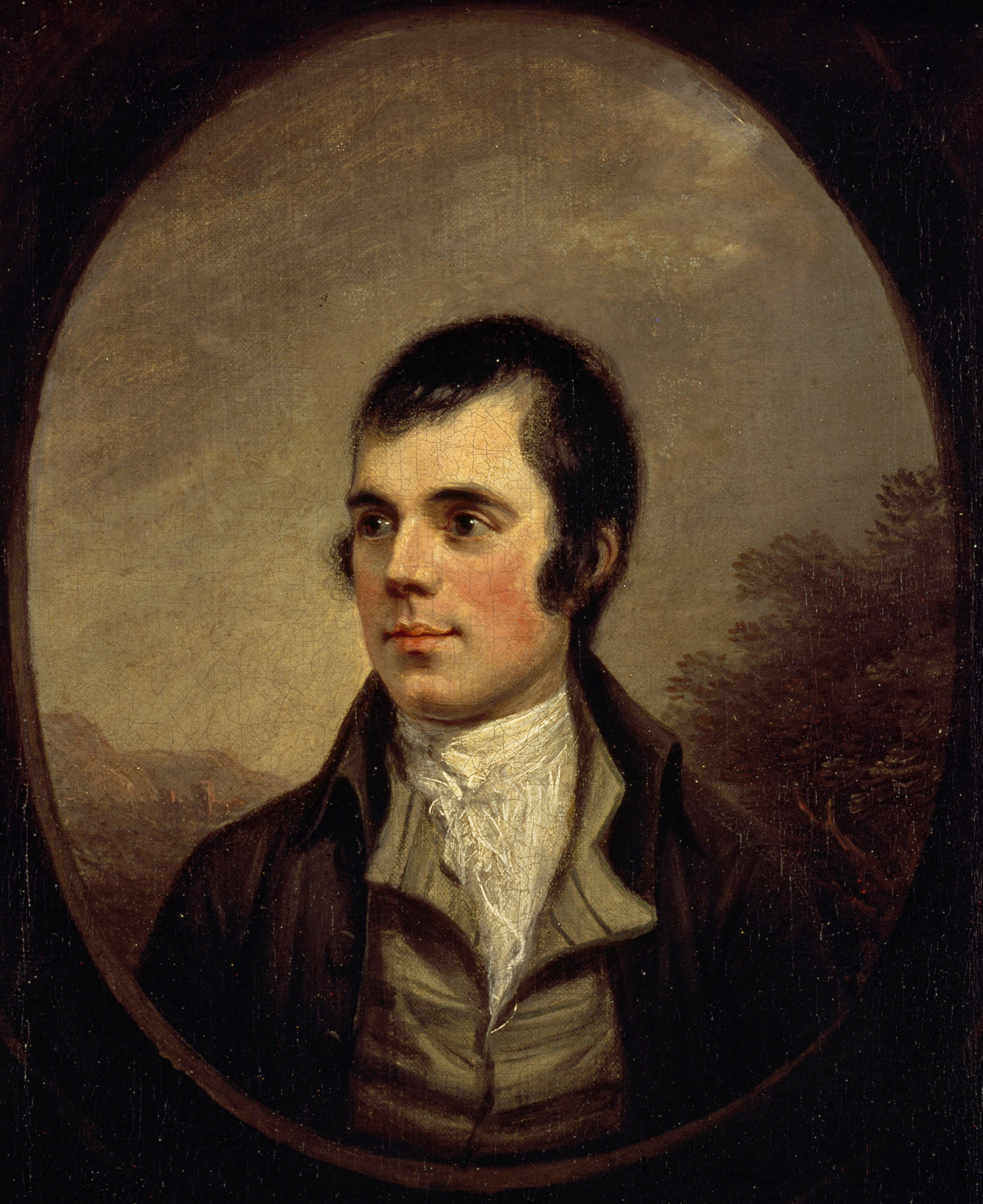
- 1787 portrait of Burns by Alexander Nasmyth
- Born: 25 January 1759; Alloway, Ayrshire, Scotland
- Died: 21 July 1796 (aged 37); Dumfries, Scotland
- Citizenship: British
- Writing career
- Movement: Romanticism

The Robert Burns World Federation is a literary society based in Kilmarnock, Ayrshire, Scotland, aimed at educating the public about the life, poetry and works of the poet Robert Burns. It is a Scottish Charity and a company limited by Guarantee. The Federation links existing Burns Clubs and similar groups, giving a unique number to affiliated Clubs, which is then used by them in their promotion and identification. Their ongoing intent is to provide a way for clubs to link together and enjoy the mutual benefit of association, communication and shared mission. It was founded in 1885

== History ==
In 1884 a statue to Robert Burns was unveiled in London. A group of those attending agreed to celebrate the forthcoming 1886 centenary of the printing of the "Kilmarnock Edition" by setting up a "Burns Federation". Societies in Burns' memory already existed, notably the Irvine Burns Club. Following an initial informal meeting in London early in 1885, the first formally minuted meeting was held in Kilmarnock, where the "Kilmarnock Edition" had been printed.

The minutes of the meeting of 17 July 1885 show that seventeen 'Burnsians' were present: - Colin Rae Brown, President of London Burns Club; Peter Sturrock, Provost of Kilmarnock and President of Kilmarnock Burns Club; Rev. Wm Dunnett; James McKie, Publisher; A. J. Symington; David Sneddon, Ex. President of Kilmarnock Burns Club; John Law, President of Springburn Burns Club; George Dunlop; Andrew Calderwood; R. S. Ingram; Richard Armstrong; Andrew Turnbull, Ex President of Kilmarnock Burns Club; David Aird; James McAlister; Arthur Sturrock; Thomas McCulloch and David Mackay, Secretary of Kilmarnock Burns Club.

At this 1886 meeting the proposal by the London representative that the London Burns Club should be allocated the prestigious Number 1 as the initial idea had been raised in London in 1885. When the roll was first announced, the reader started with Kilmarnock Burns Club No. 0, London Burns Club No.1 and the situation has remained this way ever since.

== Organisation ==
The Board of the Robert Burns World Federation (RBWF) is composed of the main Directors (as per the Articles of Assoc. inc. President, Snr Vice, Jnr Vice, Immediate Past President and the three overseas Directors i.e. USA, Canada and Pacific Rim). Additional Directors are Archivist, Conference, Heritage, Literature, Marketing and Schools, with two non-exec directors of Education and Membership.

== Activities ==
Provost Peter Sturrock of Kilmarnock was the first RBWF President, followed by Provost David Mackay of Kilmarnock.

=== Burns Clubs ===
In 2013 the Robert Burns World Federation had over 250 member clubs worldwide. The 1941 'Burns Chronicle and Club Directory' lists that 577 Burns Clubs had federated to that date. The first four federated clubs were - 0. Kilmarnock (1885), 1. London (1885), 2. Alexandria (1885), 3. Tam O'Shanter (1885).

=== Archives ===
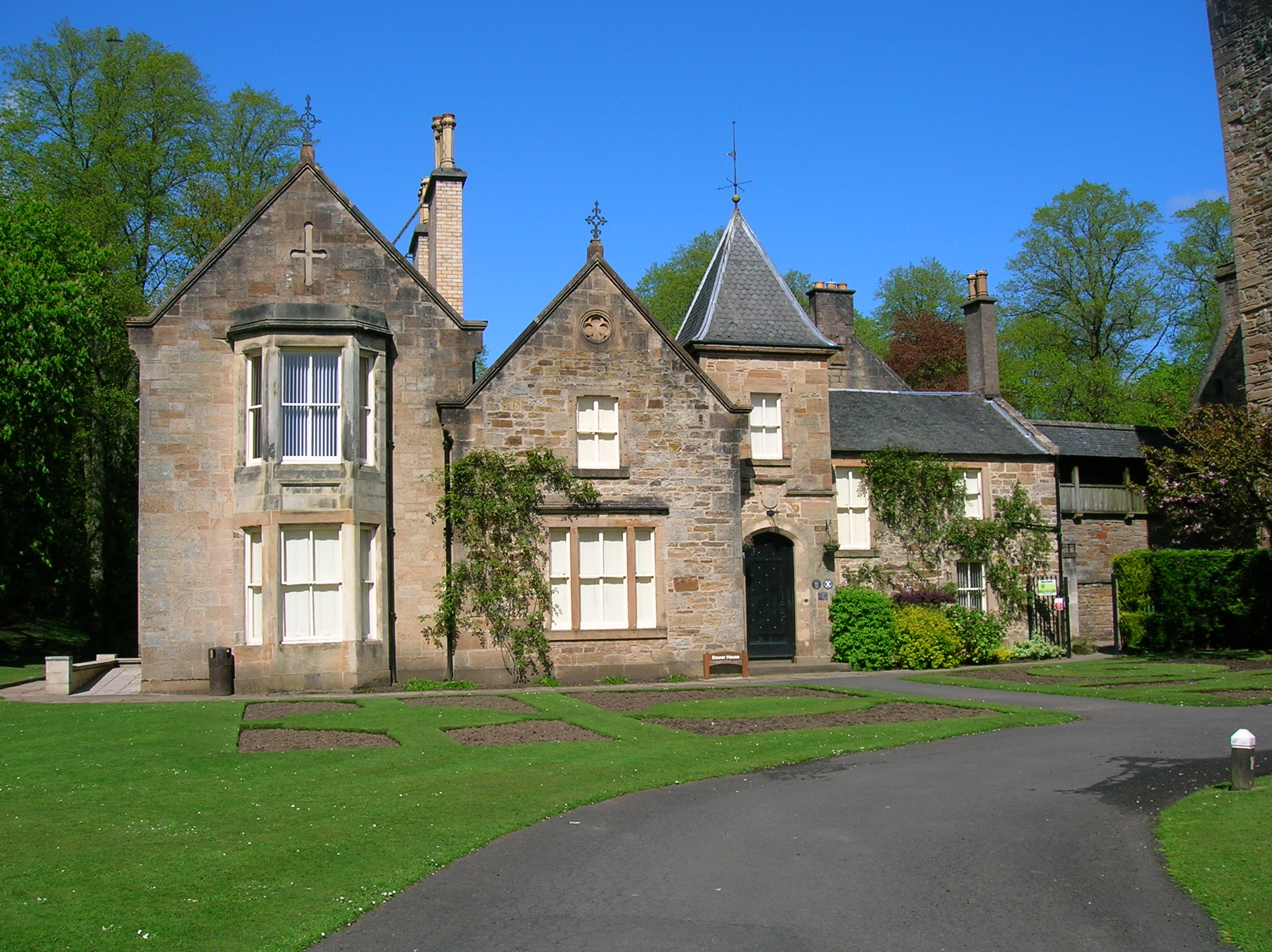
The Dower House at Dean Castle was home to the Robert Burns World Federation until 2018.

The federation holds a number of Robert Burns artefacts such as the Betty Burns portrait by John Hunter of Kilmarnock and holograph letters, etc. held on the federation's behalf at the 'Burns Room' in the Mitchell Library, Glasgow. As a number of Burns Clubs have ceased to function and the RBWF holds a number of chains of office from said clubs, donated to them for safe keeping.

=== Annual Conference ===
The RBWF holds an annual business and learning Conference every year and has done so since 1885, exceptions being 1914 and 1939. From 1885 to 1893 the conferences were held in Kilmarnock and after that date they were held at sites throughout the United kingdom and internationally. In 2018 the conference was held in Irvine, Scotland and in 2019 it took place in Glasgow, Scotland. The Glynhill Hotel, Renfrew (near Glasgow Airport) is the venue for the Conference which will take place from 3 to 6 September 2020. The RBWF awards Honorary Life Memberships and certificates to recognise outstanding service and other contributions to the federation and to the furtherance of the memory of Robert Burns and his works.

=== The Burns Chronicle ===
A 'Burns Chronicle' is issued every year and was first published by the Burns Federation in 1891. The Chronicle, contains current articles on Robert Burns and Scottish enlightenment and acts as a record of club activities with special editions issued for events such as the 2009 'Homecoming'. Duncan McNaught was the second editor and held the post for 32 years. A regular 'Newsletter' is produced giving details of Burns Clubs and their activities, conferences, important visitors, publications, etc. The majority of these have now been digitised and are available online.

=== Websites ===
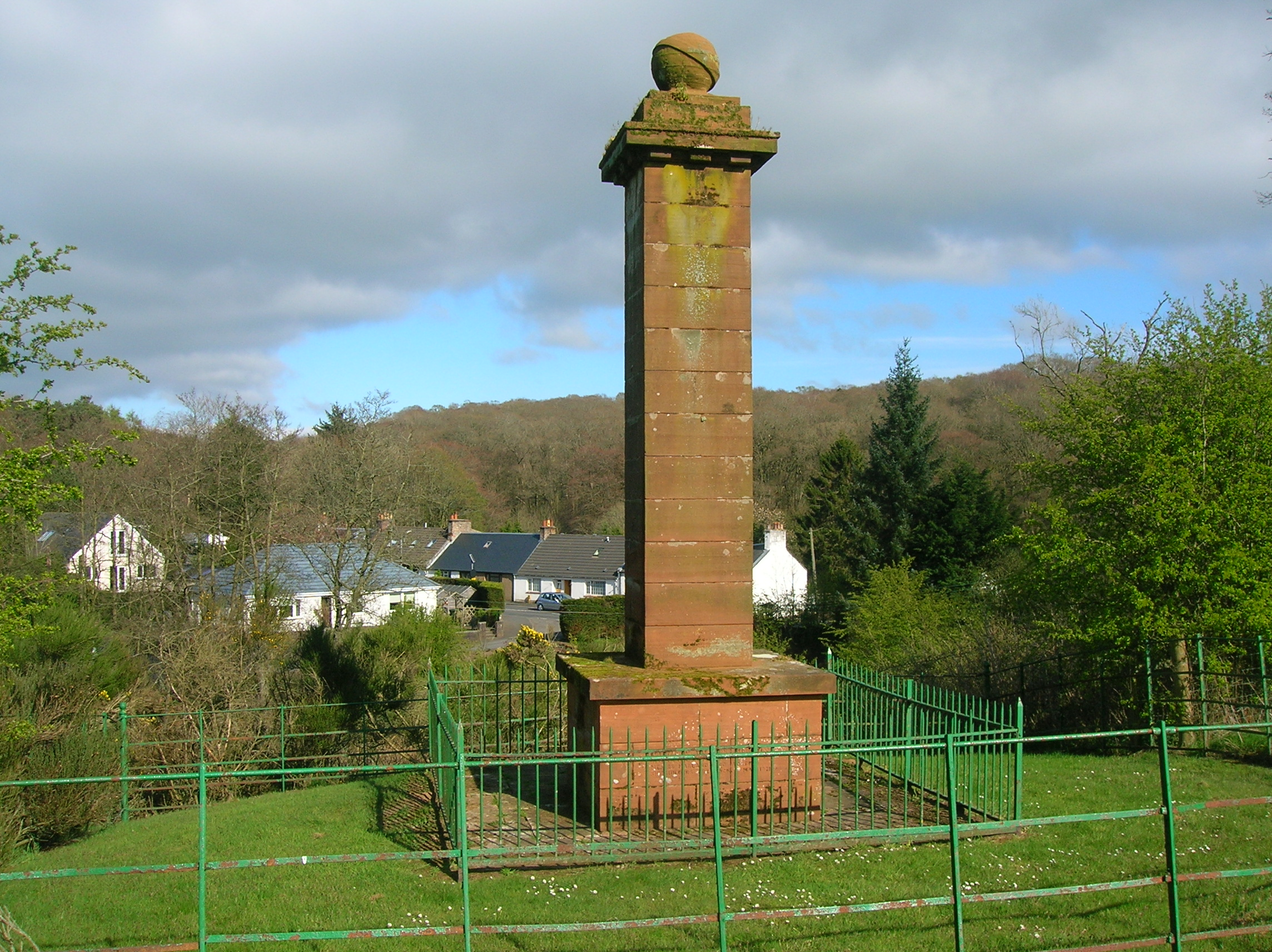
The memorial to Highland Mary at Failford.

The RBWF is represented on social media and has its own dedicated website.

=== Schools ===
The federation has been actively involved with furthering knowledge of the Scottish Language Scots dialect, the memory of Robert Burns, his songs and poetry with primary, secondary and other school pupils since its inception. A Schools Committee oversees and organises competitions and other events as do many individual Burns Clubs.

=== Memorials ===
The Robert Burns World Federation and local Burns Clubs help to maintain various Robert Burns linked sites such as the 'Trysting Tree' of Robert Burns's poem The Soldier's Return at Millmannoch and the Highland Mary and Robert Burns Memorial at Failford, both in Ayrshire. In 1933 John M. Hannah, owner of the Auchencruive Estate, gifted half an acre of the Leglen Wood to the federation which had erected a cairn as a memorial to Robert Burns and William Wallace.

=== Campaigns ===
Since April 2014 the Federation has been involved in a campaign to have Prestwick Airport renamed "Robert Burns Airport".

== See also ==
- Robert Aiken
- Jean Armour (wife)
- Adam Armour
- Lesley Baillie
- Alison Begbie or Elizabeth Gebbie
- Nelly Blair
- Agnes Broun (mother)
- Agnes Burns (Oldest sister)
- Isabella Burns (Youngest sister)
- Robert Burnes (uncle)
- William Burnes (father)
- May Cameron
- Mary Campbell (Highland Mary)
- Jenny Clow
- Jean Gardner
- Helen Hyslop
- Nelly Kilpatrick
- Jessie Lewars
- John MacKenzie (Doctor)
- Agnes Maclehose
- John Murdoch (teacher)
- Ann Park
- Elizabeth Paton
- Anne Rankine
- John Richmond (lawyer)
- Peggy Thompson
- James Smith (draper)
- Isabella Steven
- Brow, Dumfries and Galloway
- Burns Clubs
- Burns supper
- Robert Burns' diamond point engravings
- Drukken Steps
- Robert Burns and the Eglinton Estate
- Ellisland Farm, Dumfries
- Friar's Carse
- The Hermitage (Friars Carse)
- Glenriddell Manuscripts
- Robert Burns's Commonplace Book 1783–1785
- Robert Burns's Interleaved Scots Musical Museum
- Poems, Chiefly in the Scottish Dialect (Edinburgh Edition)
- Poems, Chiefly in the Scottish Dialect (Second Edinburgh Edition)
- Poems, Chiefly in the Scottish Dialect (London Edition)
- A Manual of Religious Belief
