= John Patrick McKenzie =

Artist (born 1962)

John Patrick McKenzie (born 1962, Quezon City, Philippines) is an autistic San Francisco-based artist, known for creating works of visual poetry. His works have been exhibited internationally, including in New York, Europe, Australia, and Japan.

== About ==
McKenzie's process is based on a complex and mysterious repetitive sequencing. He methodically adds layers of nuance to each chosen subject, which is most often people and objects from pop culture, current events, and the artist's immediate surroundings. Swirling, multi-angled, and disorienting, the placement of McKenzie's language comments on the contradictory, sometimes overwhelming, nature of media attention and celebrity.

McKenzie's work explores recurring themes in Hollywood, fashion, marketing, and geopolitics. According to the artist, it examines the challenges of interpreting an information-saturated world while emphasizing that people ultimately communicate their individual preferences.

Since 1989, he has been working at Creativity Explored in San Francisco.

== Works ==
McKenzie's works typically are made up of variations on a theme sentence scrawled in black ink on white paper, though he sometimes uses color or writes on other materials. He writes in a stereotyped font in which all letters are filled in. Pop cultural or political icons figure prominently his works, which always feature a repeating prompt, for example:

George Lucas is full of Luke Skywalker They are full of holy Europe

George Lucas is full of Burger King They are full of holy Asia
George Lucas is full of stars They are full of holy Australia
George Lucas if full of movies

George Lucas is full of Streets of San Francisco and Oceania ...

== Reception ==
McKenzie is considered to be a "rising star" in the world of outsider art. His work has been shown around the world, both in group exhibitions of outsider works (for example in Australia) and is solo shows.

== Collaborators and collectors ==
- Tracy Chapman
- Michael Stipe
- UC Berkeley Art Museum
