= John McKenzie (Australian footballer) =

Australian rules footballer

Personal information
- Full name: John McKenzie
- Born: 19 May 1885
- Died: 21 May 1971 (aged 86)

Playing career^{1}
Years	Club	Games (Goals)
1906	Geelong	2 (1)
- ^{1} Playing statistics correct to the end of 1906.

John McKenzie (19 May 1885 – 21 May 1971) was an Australian rules footballer who played with Geelong in the Victorian Football League (VFL).
