= 19th Scripps National Spelling Bee =

Spelling bee held in the United States in 1946

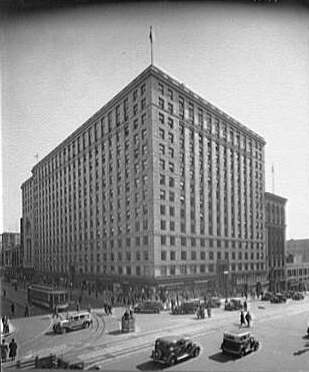
- National Press Building
- Date: May 24, 1946
- Location: Auditorium of the National Press Building, Washington, D.C.
- Winner: John McKinney (13 at time of win)
- Sponsor: The Des Moines Register and Tribune
- Sponsor location: Des Moines, Iowa
- Winning word: semaphore
- No. of contestants: 29
- Pronouncer: Harold F. Harding

The 19th Scripps National Spelling Bee was held in Washington, District of Columbia on May 24, 1946, sponsored by the E.W. Scripps Company. There had been no National Spelling Bee since 1942 due to World War II.

There were 29 contestants, ranging in age from 11 to 14. The winner was 13-year-old John McKinney of Woodbine, Iowa, correctly spelling flaccid, followed by semaphore. Mary McCarthy of New York placed second, missing flaccid, followed by Leslie Dean, 12, of New Jersey in third. 10-year-old Jay Noble of Staten Island, New York placed fourth.

The first place prize was a $500 bond (plus $150 in cash).

== External ==
- Film footage of 1946 bee (2:08), British Pathé footage (shows final three contestants spelling)
