= John Joseph Mackenzie =

Canadian pathologist

John Joseph Mackenzie (24 March 1865 – 1 August 1922) was a Canadian pathologist and bacteriologist. He was born at St. Thomas, Canada West, and was educated at Toronto, Leipzig, and Berlin universities, and later was appointed bacteriologist at the Ontario Board of Health. In 1900 he became professor of pathology and bacteriology in Toronto University. He was made fellow of the Royal Society of Canada (1909), president of the Canadian Institute (1909), and a member of the Society of American Bacteriologists and of the American Association of Pathologists and Bacteriologists. He contributed scientific papers to the medical press and published Recent Theories in Regard to the Causes of Immunity to Infectious Disease (1907).
