= Jock MacKenzie =

Scottish footballer

Personal information
- Full name: John MacKenzie
- Date of birth: 28 July 1885
- Place of birth: Douglas, Scotland
- Date of death: 10 October 1940 (aged 55)
- Place of death: Walsall, England
- Position: Left back

Senior career*
Years	Team	Apps	(Gls)
–1909	Glenbuck Cherrypickers		
1909–1910	Carlisle United		
1910–1915	Norwich City		
1915–1916	Heart of Midlothian	25	(0)
	Millwall	0	(0)
1921–1922	Walsall	4	(0)
- * Club domestic league appearances and goals

John MacKenzie (28 July 1885 – 10 October 1940) was a Scottish professional footballer who made over 200 appearances as a left back for Southern League club Norwich City. He also played in the Scottish League for Heart of Midlothian and in the Football League for Walsall.

== Personal life ==
In December 1915, nearly 18 months since the outbreak of the First World War, MacKenzie enlisted as a gunner in the Royal Garrison Artillery. He saw service in Africa and was transferred to the Class Z Reserve in October 1919. He died of "heart failure due to coronary thrombosis" in his Pleck home in 1940.

== Career statistics ==
Appearances and goals by club, season and competition
Club	Season	League			National Cup		Other		Total	
Club	Season	Division	Apps	Goals	Apps	Goals	Apps	Goals	Apps	Goals
Heart of Midlothian	1915–16	Scottish First Division	25	0	—		1 (Note: Appearance in Wilson Cup)	0	26	0
Career total			25	0	0	0	1	0	26	0
