= John MacKenzie (doctor) =

Scottish army surgeon

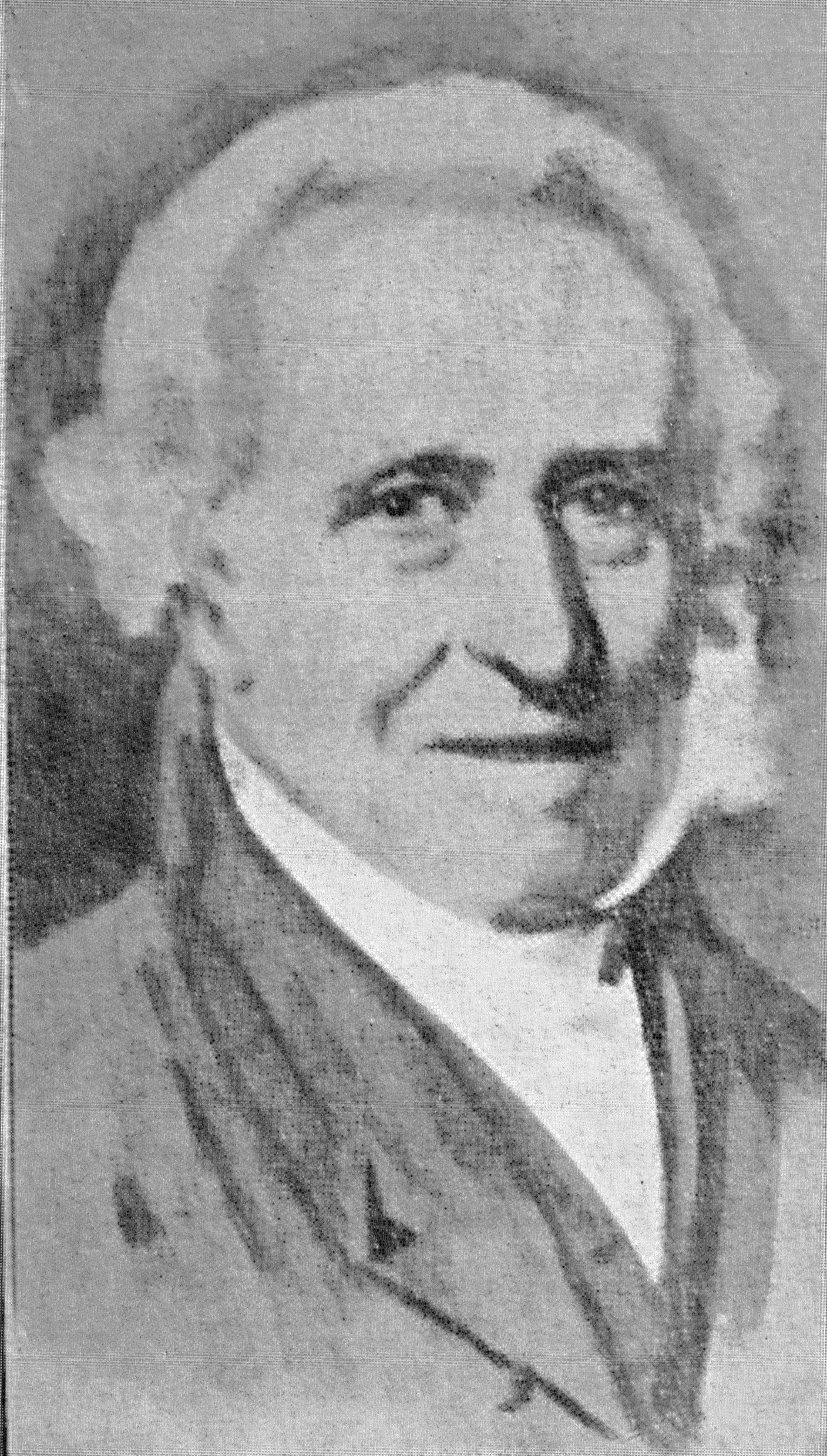
- Doctor John MacKenzie
- Born: c. 1755; Ayrshire, Scotland
- Died: 4 January 1837; Edinburgh, Scotland
- Education: University of Edinburgh
- Occupation: physician

John MacKenzie (c. 1755–1837) was a Scottish army surgeon. He was a native of Ayrshire, where he married Helen Miller (d.1827), one of the "Six proper Mauchline belles" who is buried in Irvine's Old Parish church. He was a member with Robert Burns of the St James Lodge, Tarbolton. His house in Mauchline is now the 'Burns House Museum,' run by East Ayrshire Council. MacKenzie wrote "Origin of Morals and Common Sense".

== Life ==
John MacKenzie was an Army surgeon. He served as a burgess, a baillie, Treasurer and Dean of Guild on the Irvine Council. His grave is in the New Calton Burying Ground, Edinburgh, but there is a commemorative stone to him and his wife Helen Miller in Irvine Old Parish Churchyard. As stated, his wife was the Nell of "A Mauchline Wedding", a daughter of John Miller of Millockshill and of the Sun Inn, Mauchline. He met Nell when he stayed at the Sun Inn, marrying her in 1791. They had a son, John Whitefoord Mackenzie, W.S., Edinburgh, a literary and antiquarian collector, who died in Edinburgh in 1884.

=== Physician ===
MacKenzie studied medicine at the University of Edinburgh, and, on the invitation of Sir John Whitefoord of Ballochmyle, set up in practice in Mauchline. In 1824, received his MD from the University for his thesis on "De Carcinomate",. His first surgery was located at the house later occupied by James Lambie, tailor and clothier that faced onto the square. He retired to live in Edinburgh, where he died on 11 January 1837, at an advanced age and he is buried in Edinburgh's New Calton Burial Ground.

In 1801, the 12th Earl of Eglinton, Hugh Montgomerie, persuaded Dr MacKenzie to move from Mauchline to Irvine and live free of rent for life at Seagate House. In return, he acted as the Montgomerie's family doctor, retained at an annuity of £130 in full payment for his professional services. He retired in 1827. MacKenzie also carried on General Practice in Irvine.

== Association with Robert Burns ==
Robert Burns first met Dr MacKenzie when he attended the poet's father, William Burns, at Lochlea Farm in the early spring of 1783. Dr MacKenzie related that: "The Poet seemed distant, suspicious, and without any wish to interest or please. He kept himself very silent in a dark corner of the room; and before he took any part in the conversation, I frequently detected him scrutinising me during my conversation with his father and brother. But afterwards, when the conversation, which was on a medical subject, had taken the turn he wished, he began to engage in it, displaying a dexterity of reasoning, an ingenuity of reflection, and a familiarity with topics apparently beyond his reach, by which his visitor was no less gratified than astonished."

Burns's move to Mossgiel Farm permitted a warm friendship to develop. In 1786 MacKenzie received a rhymed summons from Burns to attend: "a procession celebrating the Festival of the Nativity of the Baptist, Friday first's the day appointed". In "The Holy Fair", Dr MacKenzie is personified as "Commonsense", who left the assembly to keep a dinner appointment with Sir John Whiteford at the home of the Earl of Dumfries as soon as "Peebles, frae the water-fit" began to preach.

Friday first's the day appointed
By the Right Worshipful Anointed,
To hold our grand Procession,
To get a blade o' Johnie's Morals,
And taste a swatch o' Manson's barrels,
I' the way of our Profession:
Our Master and the Brotherhood
Wad a' be glad to see you;
For me I would be mair than proud
To share the mercies wi' you.
If Death then wi' skaith then
Some mortal heart is hechtin,
Inform him, and storm him,
That Saturday ye'll fecht him.

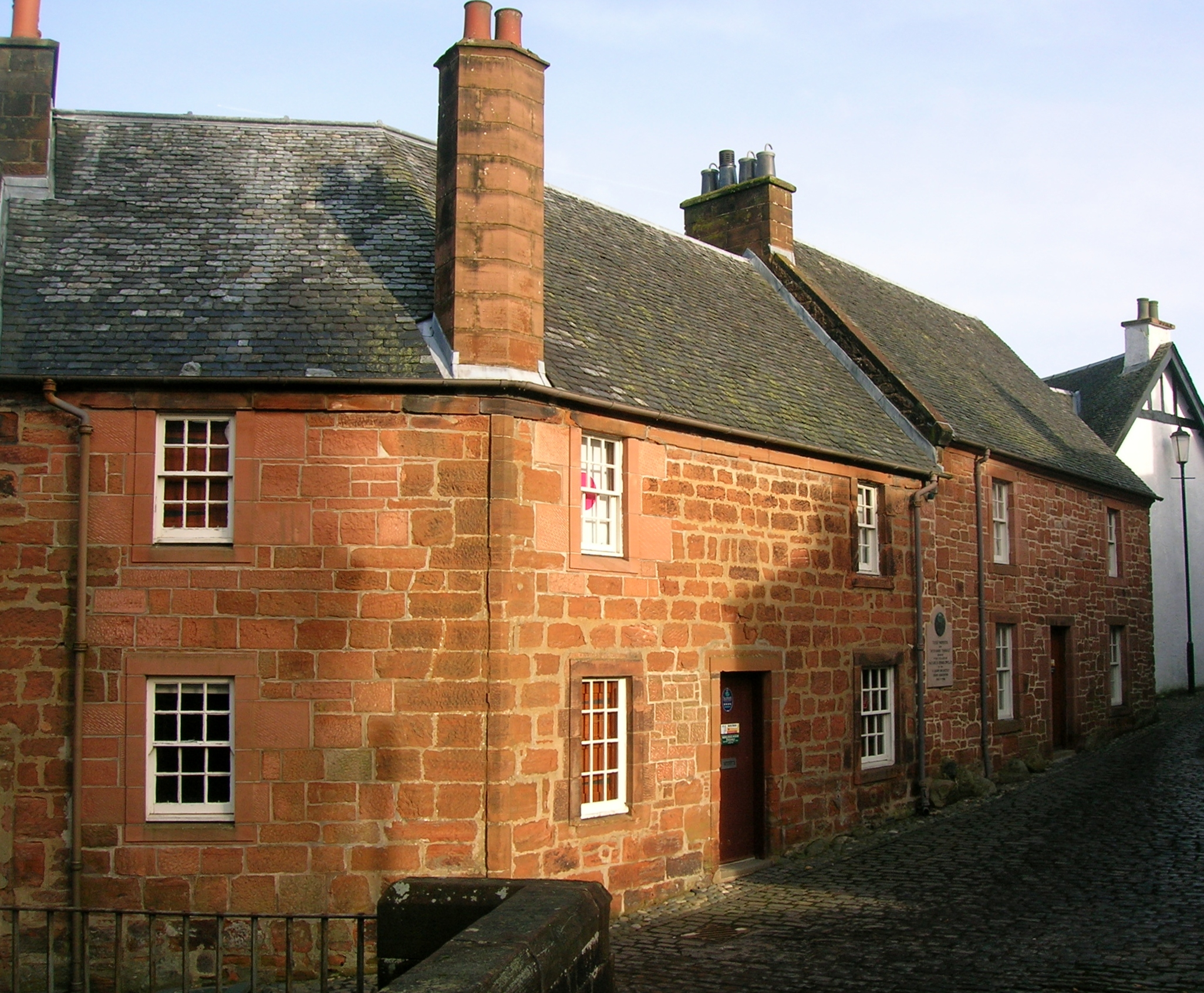
Dr MacKenzie's house in Mauchline

Findlay states that in September 1786 "John MacKenzie, happening to call at Gavin Hamilton's house at the time that Burns was reading his performance (of 'The Calf'), was so tickled with the verses that he extracted from him the promise of a copy, which he sent the same Sunday night, accompanied by a brief note, telling him that the fourth and last stanzas were added since he saw him that day".

It was probably through MacKenzie that Burns was introduced to Professor Dugald Stewart. The professor had an estate near Catrine on the River Ayr near Mossgiel Farm and was a close friend of MacKenzie, the Burns's family doctor. Through Dr MacKenzie, Prof Stewart invited Robert Burns to dinner at Catrine on Monday 23 October 1786.

MacKenzie sent off letters of recommendation to Sir John Whitefoord and to the Honourable Andrew Erskine in preparation for Burns visit to Edinburgh. Sir John received Burns with particular kindness, as Burns reported to MacKenzie in a letter dated 11 January 1787.

On the poet's return from Edinburgh in February 1788, he rented a room in MacKenzie's house for Jean and himself, where Jean's second twins were born, attended to by Dr. MacKemzie. It is known from the title deeds that Dr John McKenzie had an interest in the ownership of this house from 1788 to 1830, but whether he ever lived there, or just had a consulting room here has not been clarified.

=== Lochlea Farm and David McLure ===
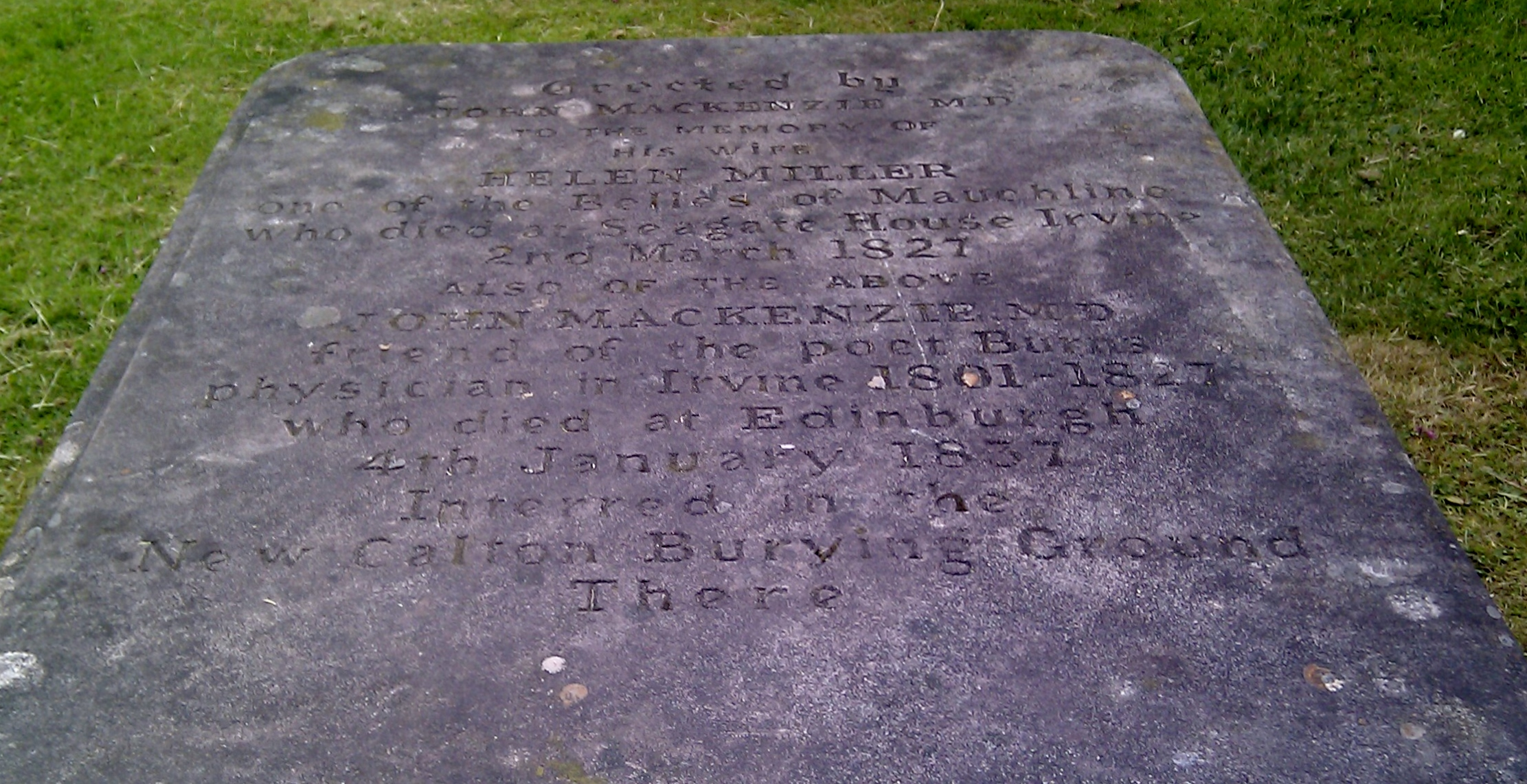
Memorial to Helen Miller, John MacKenzie's wife.

The earliest account of the distressing affair regarding David McLure and the litigation against Robert Burns's father was given by Dr MacKenzie who said that he had attended William Burns at Lochlea towards the end of his life and from him received "a detail of the various causes that had gradually led to the embarrassment of his affairs; these he detailed in such earnest language, and in so simple, candid, and pathetic a manner as to excite both my astonishment and sympathy".

=== Irvine Burns Club ===
In 1827, the year of his retirement, he presided at the opening dinner on 25 January of the Irvine Burns Club, with the well-known Mr. David Sillar, "a brither poet" (Epistle to Davie), as vice-chairman.

== Micro-history ==
John Smith of Swindridgemuir relates in a letter of 1829 that Dr MacKenzie was present with him at a social occasion at Robertland, hosted by Sir William Cunningham, at which Robert Burns was present. A discussion took place about the identity of Tam o'Shanter during which the poet revealed that one Douglas Grahame was the individual upon whom Tam was modelled.

Dr MacKenzie was a member of the Masonic Lodge Irvine Saint Andrew Number 149. Richard Brown was also a member.

Strawhorn records that Dr.McKenzie purchased the small estate of Lochwards near the Town Mills on the Annick Water.

== See also ==
- Jean Armour
- Alison Begbie
- Richard Brown (Captain)
- Nelly Kilpatrick
- David Sillar
- Peggy Thompson
