= Robert Graham =

Robert Graham may refer to:

== Law and politics ==
- Robert Cunninghame Graham of Gartmore (1735–1797), Scottish politician and poet
- Robert Graham (judge) (1744–1836), English judge and privy counsellor
- Robert Graham (Whig politician) (1785–1859), Scottish advocate
- Robert Graham (New Zealand politician) (1820–1885), New Zealand politician
- Robert Bontine Cunninghame Graham (1852–1936), Scottish politician, writer, journalist and adventurer
- Robert M. Graham (Wisconsin politician) (1897–1981), American politician
- Robert Graham (Arizona politician) (born 1972), American businessman and Republican Party organizer
- Robert Graham (New Hampshire politician), American politician

== Science and medicine ==
- Robert Graham (botanist) (1786–1845), Scottish physician and botanist
- Robert James Douglas Graham (1884–1950), Scottish botanist
- Robert Klark Graham (1906–1997), American eugenicist, businessman, and founder of the Repository for Germinal Choice
- Robert M. Graham (computer scientist) (1929–2020), American computer scientist
- Robert Graham (physicist) (born 1942), German theoretical physicist
- Robert M. Graham (cardiologist) (born 1948), Australian-born cardiologist

== Sports ==
- Robert George Graham (1845–1922), English football player and administrator
- Robert Graham (cricketer) (1877–1946), South African cricketer
- Robert S. Graham (American football) (1881–1967), American football player and coach
- Robert Graham (footballer, born 1882) (1882–?), Scottish footballer
- Robert Graham (footballer, born 1884) (1884–1916), Scottish footballer

== Others ==
- Sir Robert Graham (died 1437), Scottish landowner; conspirator in assassination of James I of Scotland
- Robert Graham (colonel) (died 1701), Scottish colonel and Trappist monk
- Robert Graham of Fintry (1749–1815), Scottish laird, patron of poet Robert Burns
- Robert Graham (Wisconsin politician) (1827–1892), American educator
- Robert Graham (sailor) (1841–1919), American Civil War sailor and Medal of Honor recipient
- Robert A. Graham (1912–1997), American Jesuit priest and historian of the Vatican
- Robert Graham (sculptor) (1938–2008), American sculptor
- Robert Graham, pen name used by Joe Haldeman (born 1943), American science fiction author
- Robert Graham (historian) (born 1958), Canadian anarchist historian

== Other uses ==
- Robert Graham (fashion brand), New York-based fashion brand

== See also ==
- Bob Graham (disambiguation)
- Rob Graham, musician with Drenge (band)
- Graham baronets
