= Bobby Graham =

Bobby Graham is the name of

- Bobby Graham (athlete) (1909–1963), British middle-distance runner
- Bobby Graham (musician) (1940–2009), drummer
- Bobby Graham (footballer) (1944–2025), footballer

== See also ==
- Bob Graham (disambiguation)
- Robert Graham (disambiguation)
