= Mains Castle =

Castle in Dundee City, Scotland

Coordinates: 56°29′8″N 2°57′29″W

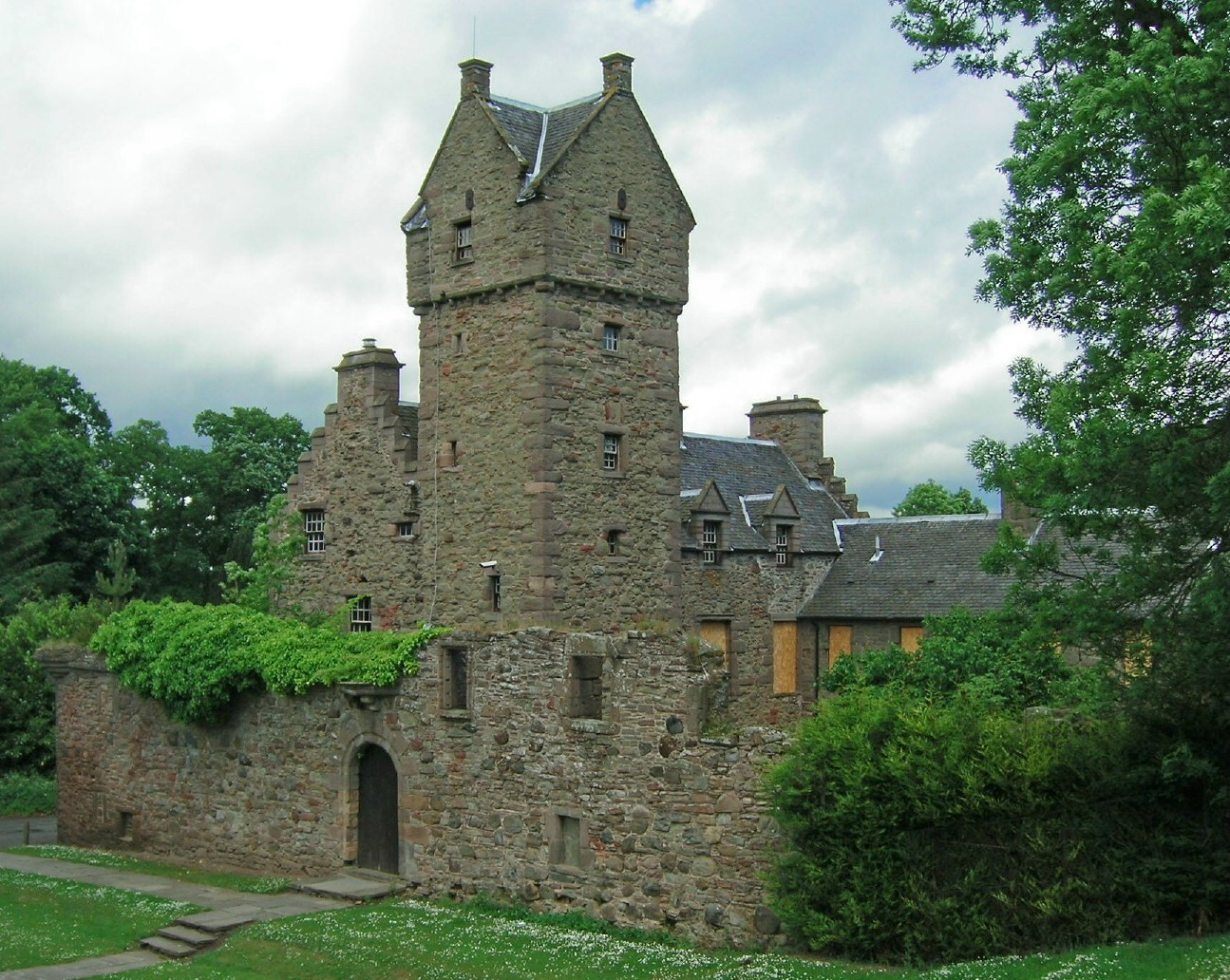
Mains Castle seen from the south west

Mains Castle (also known as Claverhouse Castle or Fintry Castle) is a 16th-century castle in Dundee, Scotland. The castle consists of several buildings surrounding a courtyard, although several of the original western buildings no longer exist. The northern and eastern buildings are where the family would have lived, with the servants occupying the southern quarters. The castle also has a large, six-floor, square tower house with dressed cornerstones, which is typical of 16th-century construction. It is a Category A listed building.

The castle is located in Dundee's Caird Park to the north of the city overlooking the Dichty valley and adjacent to a small stream known as the Gelly Burn. On the opposite side of the burn is located the mausoleum of the Graham family and the Main's cemetery, which was formerly the site of the district's kirk.

The castle and its grounds was the subject of a poem by Dundee poet William McGonagall in his work The Castle of Mains.

== History ==
The castle is believed to have been built in 1562 by Sir David Graham, nephew of Cardinal Beaton. A keystone in the western gateway bears this date as well as the initials DG and DMO for David Graham and Dame Margaret Ogilvy. A horizontal beam in one of the eastern courtyard doors bears a date of 1582, indicating a possible completion date. The castle was the seat of the Grahams of Fintry and remained so until the 19th century when Robert Graham of Fintry sold the lands to David Erskine, with the condition that his family could retain the territorial title of Graham of Fintry and that the estate revert to the older name of Lumlathen or Linlathen. The estate was later sold by Shipley Gordon Stuart Erskine to James Key Caird, who gifted the castle and its lands to the town council as a site for a public park in 1913. The park was later opened in 1923 by Caird's half sister Mrs. Marryat. The castle was renovated in the 1980s through a government scheme for the unemployed, as many of the buildings had become roofless.

An earlier castle was held by the Douglas' Earls of Angus from the 14th century until 1530 when it passed to the Grahams.

== See also ==
- Mains Castle, East Kilbride
