= Fintry Castle, Stirling =

Former castle in Stirling, Scotland

Fintry Castle
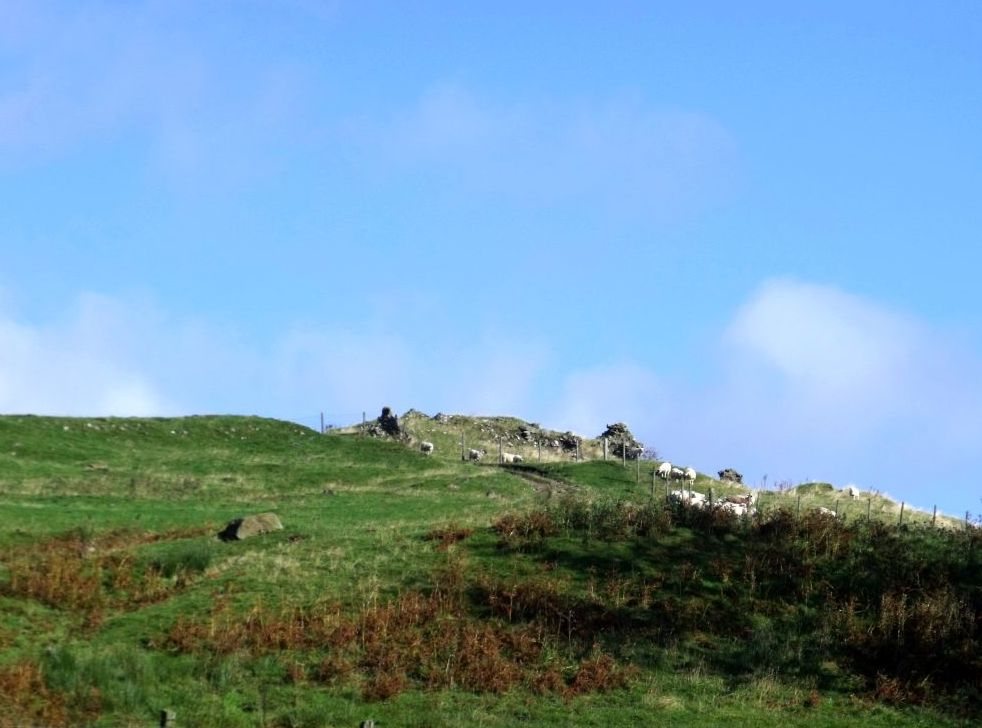
- Ruins of Fintry Castle

Site information
- Condition: ruined

Location
- Coordinates: 56.050992°N 4.1829712°W

Site history
- Built: 15th century

Fintry Castle, was a 15th-century castle near Fintry, Stirling, Scotland. The castle was built on the northern slopes of the strath of the Endrick Water.

The estate of Fintray was granted in 1460 to Sir Robert Graham of Balargus by Patrick, Lord Graham. The castle replaced the earlier motte and bailey castle of Fintray.
