= Ellisland Farm =

Museum in Dumfries and Galloway, Scotland

Coordinates: 55°8′15″N 3°40′45″W

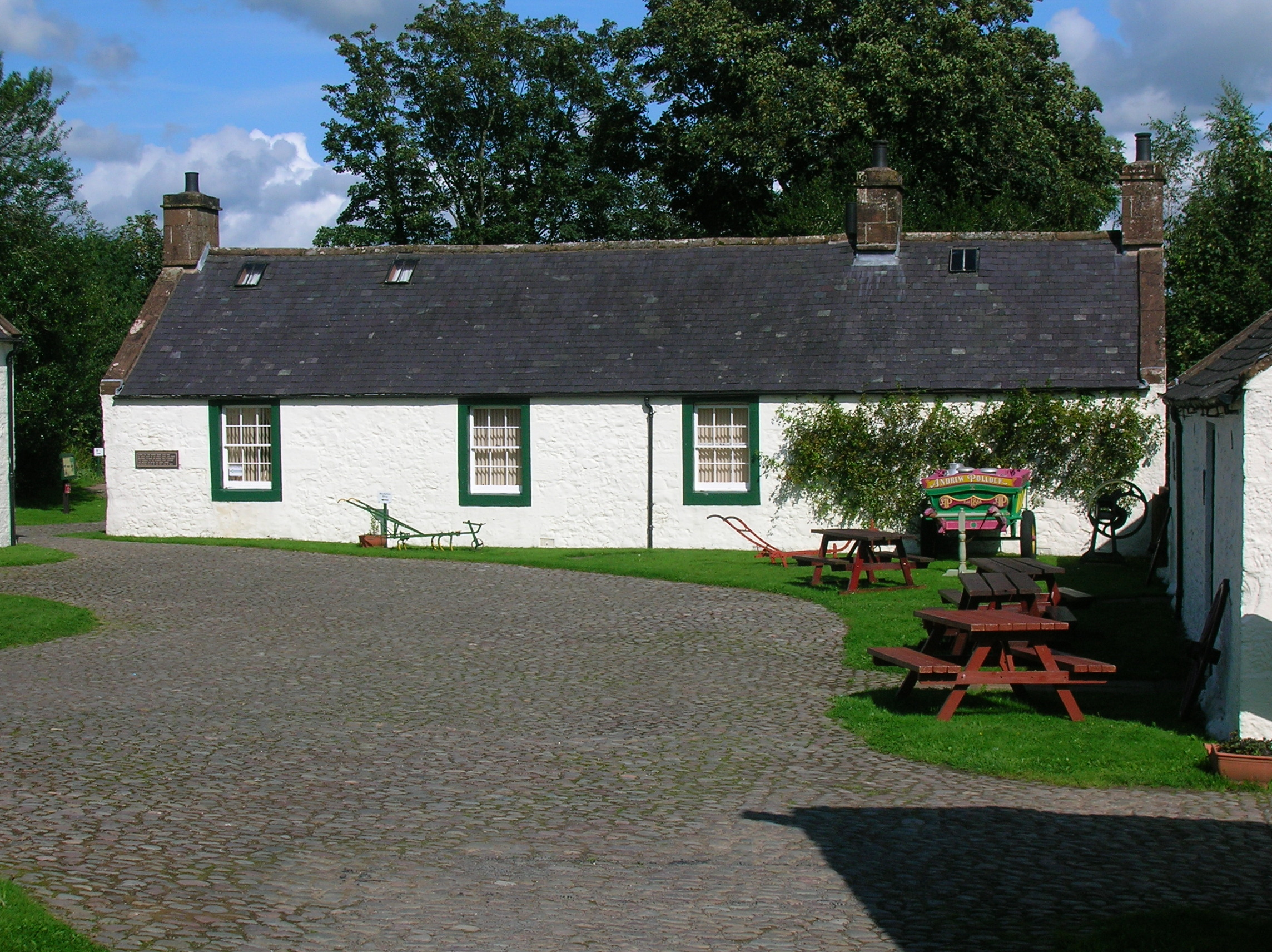
- Established: 1788
- Location: Holywood Road, Auldgirth, Dumfries DG2 0RP, United Kingdom
- Website: https://www.ellislandfarm.co.uk

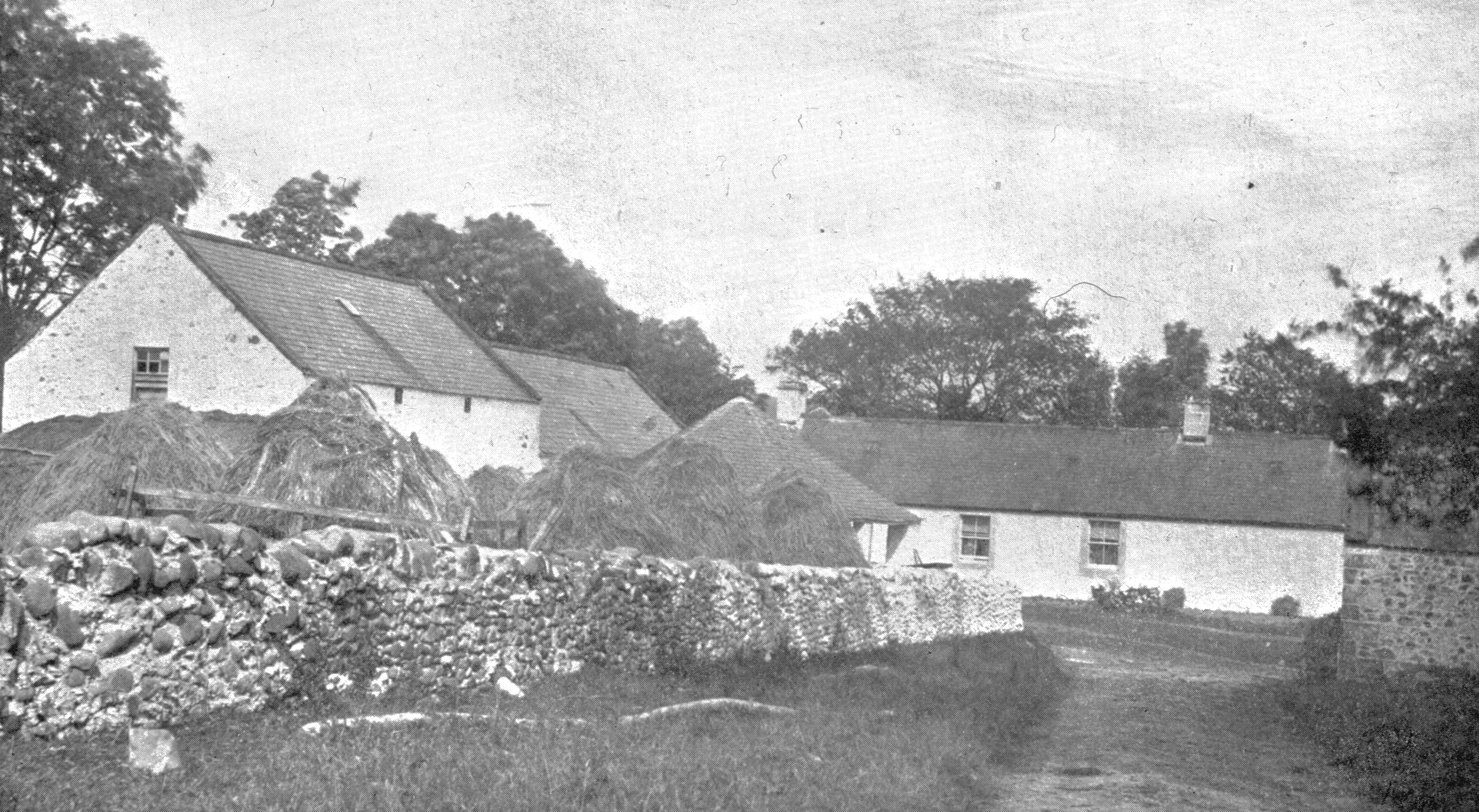
Ellisland Farm c. 1900

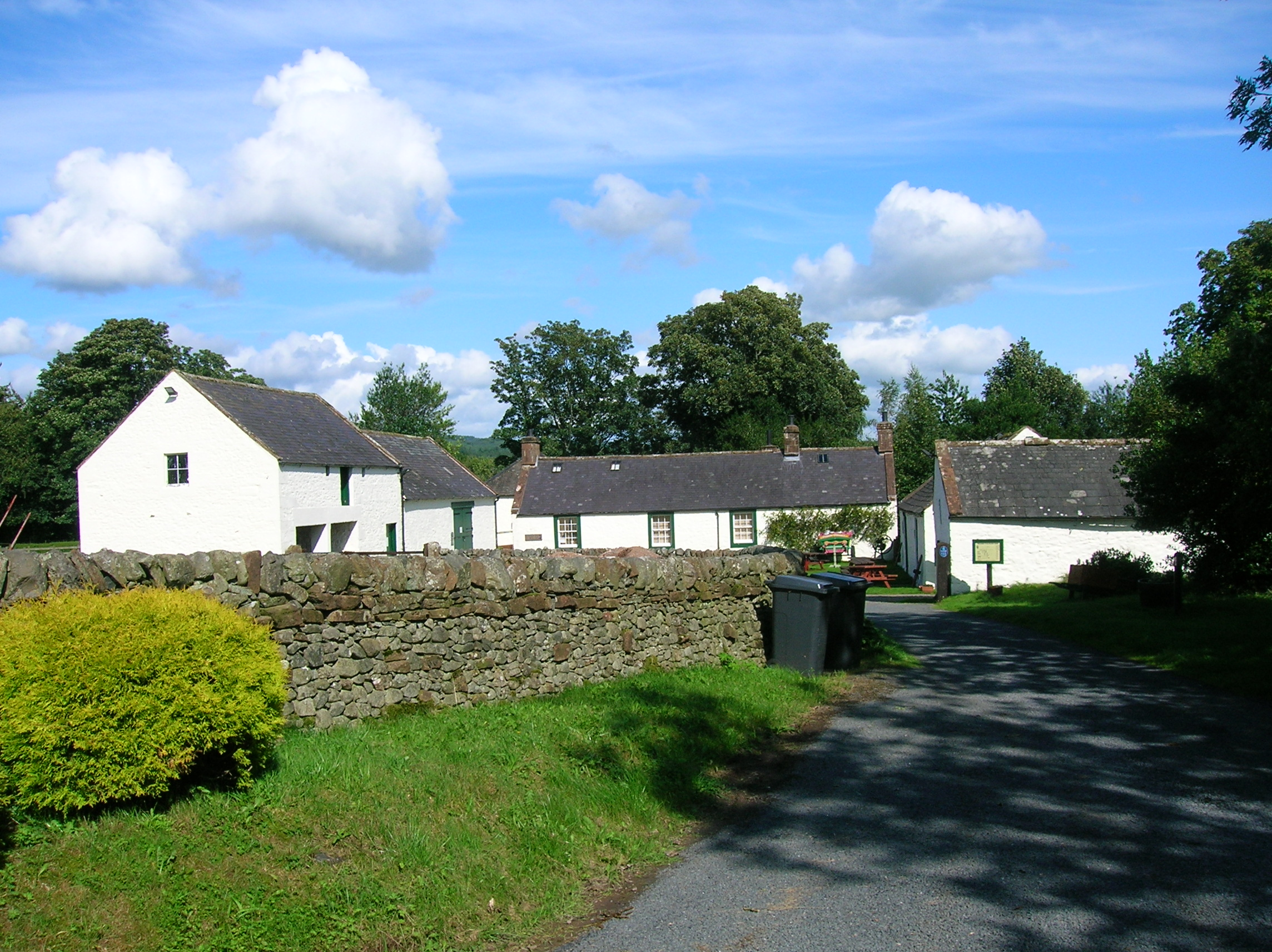
Ellisland Farm in 2009

Ellisland Farm lies about 6.5 mi/10.4 km northwest of Dumfries near the village of Auldgirth, located in the Parish of Dunscore, Dumfries and Galloway, Scotland. The complex is a museum in the farm Robert Burns built, lived in and farmed from 1788 until 1791. One of the earliest references to the site is in 1465. Cardinal Antonius confirming a Charter by the Monastery of Melrose of the adjoining property of Ellisland to John Kirkpatrick.

== History ==
William Roy's map, circa 1747–55, does not show any form of settlement at Ellisland. However William Crawford's 1804 map of Dumfries-shire marks an 'Elliesland' in the expected location, the farm having been built a few years before, however another building is marked closer to Friars' Carse. The name is said to be derived from "Isle's Land", the name of a neighbouring estate. The river may have been less of a barrier to transport than today and a ford is known to have existed nearby. The nearby Old Dunscore Churchyard is the location of 18th century memorials to the Ireland family of Elliesland (sic).

Patrick Miller of Dalswinton wrote of the area in September 1810, saying;

"When I purchased this estate about twenty-five years ago, I had not seen it. It was in the most miserable state of exhaustion, and all the tenants in poverty. .... When I went to view my purchase, I was so much disgusted for eight or ten days, that I then meant to return to this county."

=== The Poets choice ===
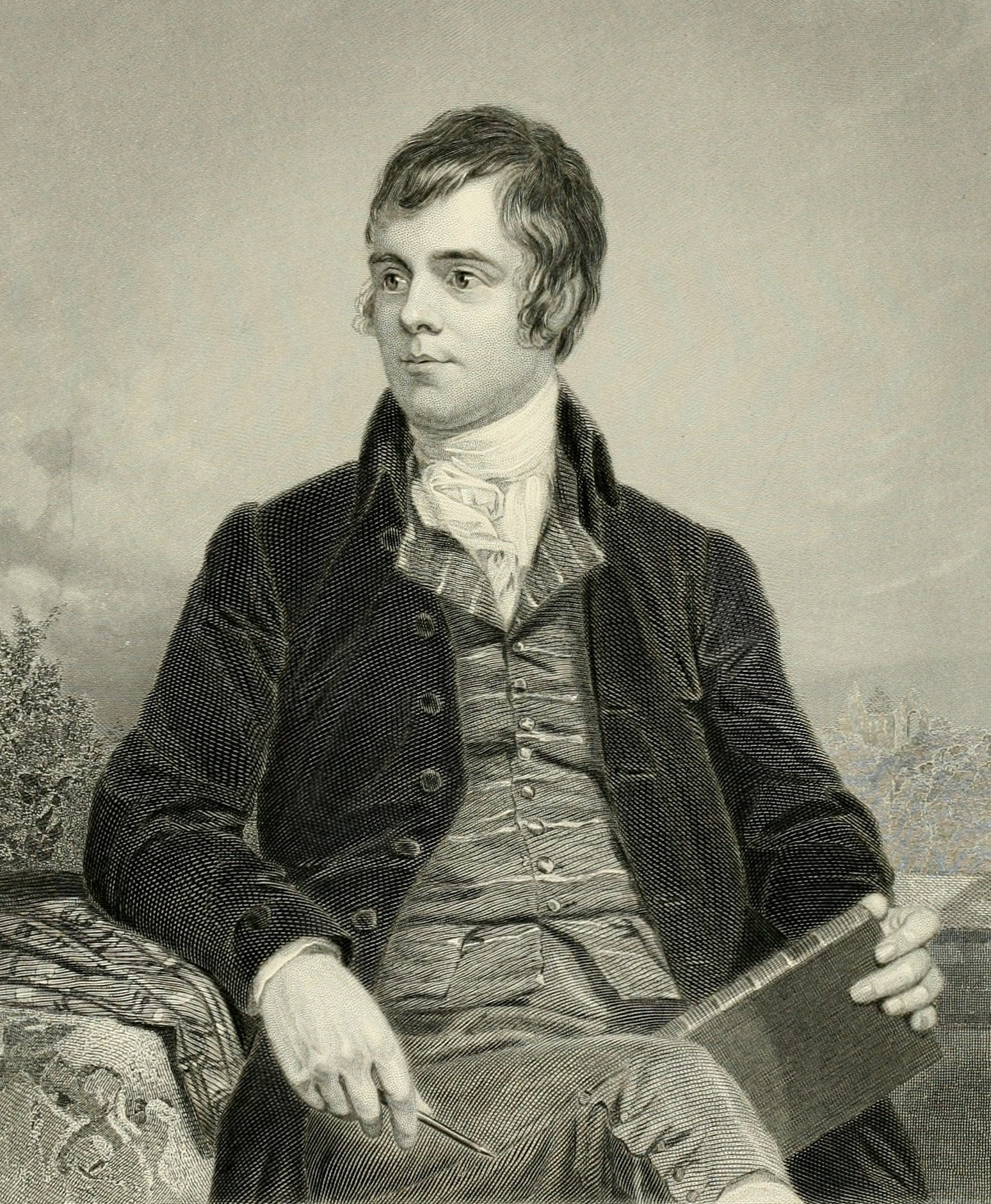
Robert Burns by Alexander Nasmyth, 1787

Patrick Miller of Dalswinton had offered Burns a choice of three farms, two on the rich holms of the River Nith's east side; and one, Ellisland, on the west bank, composed of a fertile strip along the river itself and stony fields between the river and the Dumfries road. Burns visited Ellisland on 27 February 1788 with James Tennant of Glenconner, a friend of himself and his father; taking James's advice he agreed to sign up to the seventy-six-year lease from his friend Patrick Miller of Dalswinton, taking up the lease of the farm at Whitsun (25 May) 1788. The lease was divided up into four periods of nineteen years, the rent for the first three years to be £50 per annum, and £70 thereafter.

Robert had written a letter to his friend Patrick Miller, on 20 October 1787:

I want to be a farmer in a small farm, about a plough-gang, in a pleasant country, under the auspices of a good landlord. I have no foolish notion of being a tenant on easier terms than another.

To find a farm where one can live at all is not easy – I only mean living soberly, like an old-style farmer, and joining personal industry.

The banks of the Nith are as sweet poetic ground as any I ever saw; and besides, Sir, 'tis but justice to the feelings of my own heart and the opinion of my best friends, to say that I would wish to call you landlord sooner than any landed gentleman I know…

=== The Burns family at Ellisland ===
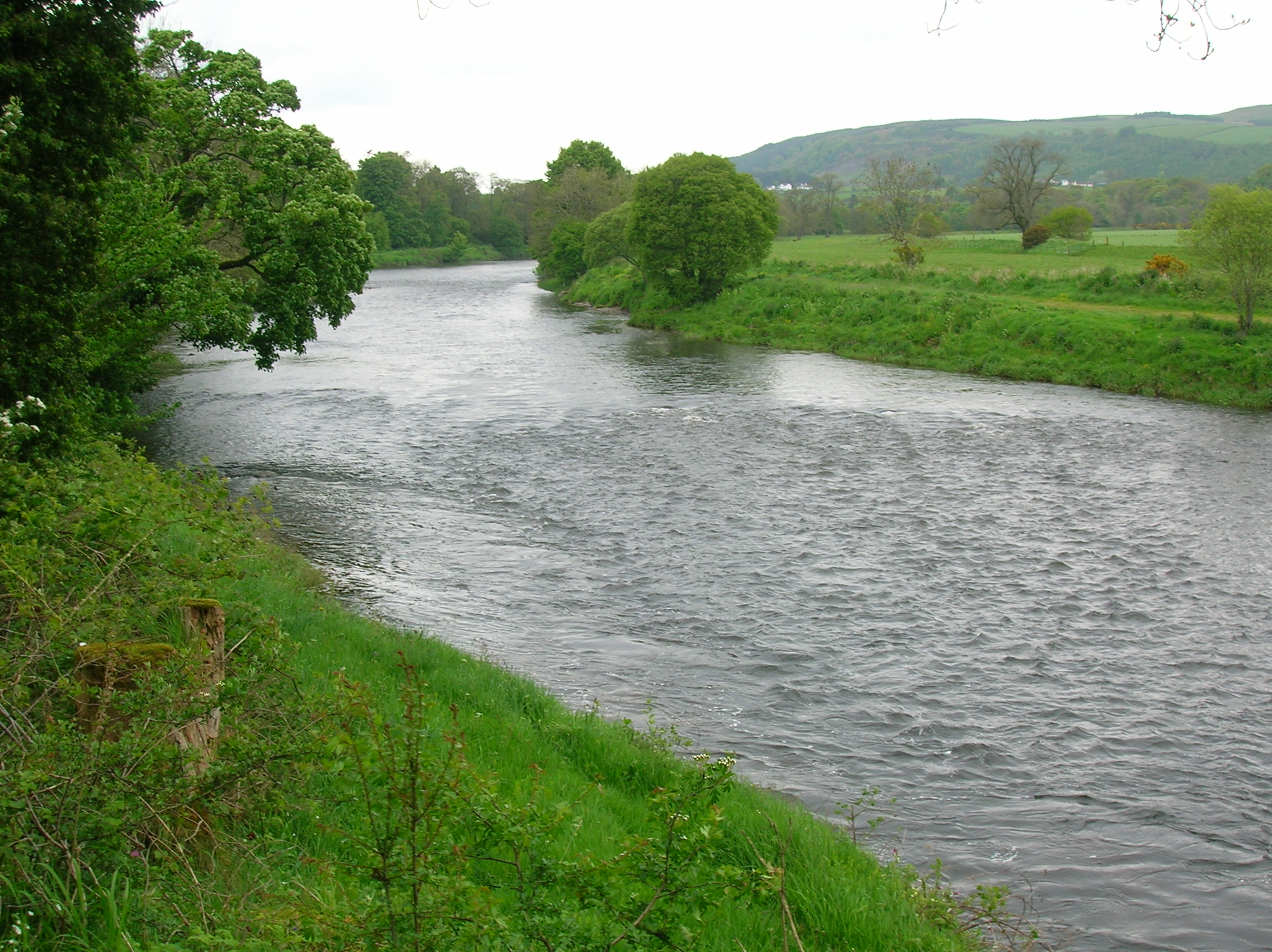
The River Nith at Ellisland Farm

Burns did not begin farming work until 11 June 1788. Ellisland had no farmhouse or farm buildings and Patrick Miller provided Burns with £300 to build one, construct the byre, cart shed, etc. and to stock the farm and enclose the fields.

Robert had formally married Jean Armour on 20 March, but Robert, Jean and their two-year-old son Robert would not be able to move into the farm until the following Spring; Robert at first lodged with David and Nance Cullie or Kelly, the previous tenant, in their cottage near the ruin of the Isle Tower. In December Jean came down to Nithsdale and stayed rent free with Robert at the Isle, the country house of David Newall, a Dumfries lawyer.

On 23 June 1788 Robert informed his good friend, the lawyer, Robert Ainslie, that he had arranged a sitting with John Miers, the artist, to produce a profile or silhouette picture and that together with one of Lord Glencairn and one of Dr Blacklock he intended to hang them on his new mantlepiece at Ellisland Farm.

The whole family moved into Ellisland during June 1789, walking the short distance up from the Isle in procession, and to ensure good luck they entered in their best clothes, following a servant-maid, Elizabeth Smith, who carried the family bible on which sat a bowl of salt. As Robert and Jean entered, an oat-cake was broken over the head of the wife and everyone gathered for a drink to the success of the new home; the evening would have been taken up with a 'house warming'; dancing and drinking with friends and neighbours. Mrs Dunlop of Dunlop House had given the couple a four poster bed and they had a selection of furniture made by Ayrshire carpenters.

Jean was said to be a good and prudent housewife, kept everything in neat and tidy order, was well liked by the servants and provided plenty of wholesome food. The maid-servant, Elizabeth, previously mentioned was a cousin. Robert Ainslie was not so complimentary when he visited Ellisland in October 1790.

Burns' sons Francis Wallace and William Nicol were born at Ellisland Farm, and their half-sister Betty (daughter of Helen Anne Park of Dumfries) spent the first months of her life here too.

For a time Robert's youngest brother William lived at Ellisland until he got a job as an apprentice saddler near Carlisle.

=== The farm and the land ===
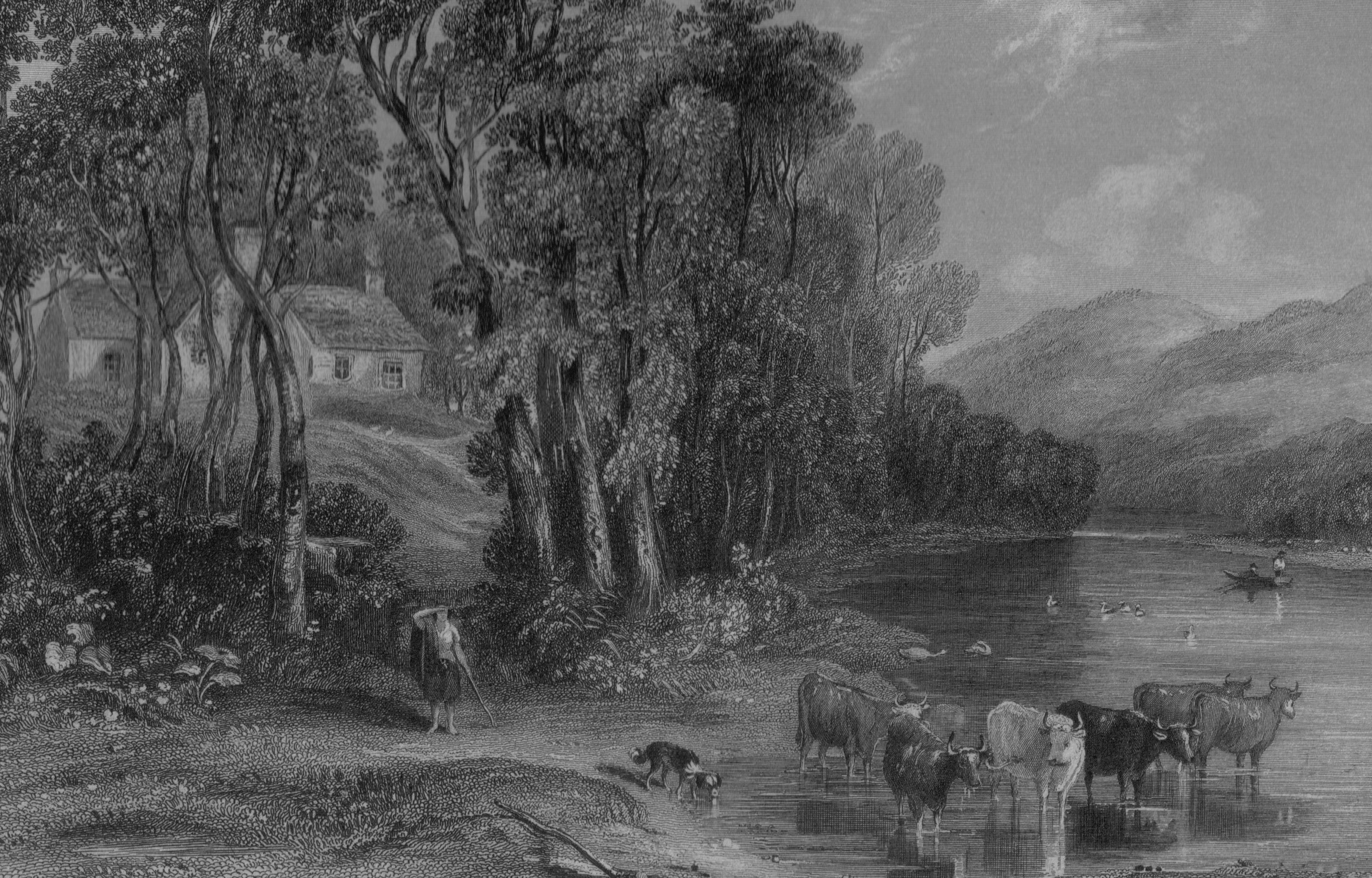
Ellisland Farm in the time of Robert Burns

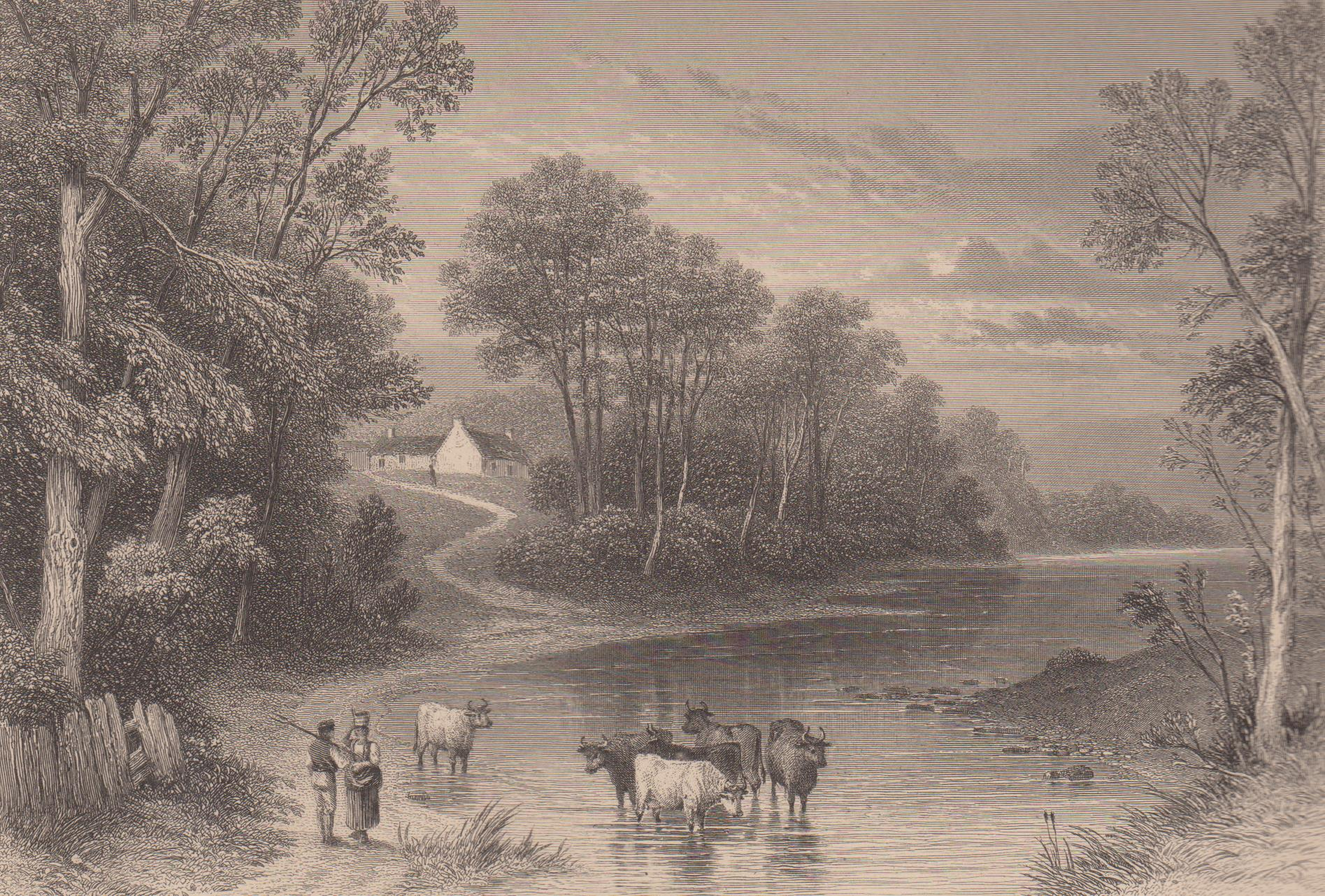
Ellisland Farm and the River Nith, circa 1800

The house Burns built stood on a gravelly bank above the river and had one storey, with garrets for the servants. In the west end there was a 'company' room, and in the east a sitting-room, with a window in the gable giving fine views of the surroundings. A kitchen and a bedroom formed the middle of the dwelling. Alexander Crombie was the stonemason and Thomas Boyd was the architect, the completion being much delayed and the account not settled until two months before Burns left Ellisland. The hearth in the kitchen has apotropaic marks carved onto it to protect against the Devil entering via the chimney and a small window, now blocked up, existed at the fireplace so that the Devil would be sent straight out of the house.

The plan of the present house is practically that of the original and although it is said that Burns's cottage was pulled down in 1812, it is likely that the main portion of the walls stand as they did in 1788. Some of the windows were said in 1840 to carrying the faint traces of the poetic 'glass-scribblings' of which Burns was so fond. A copious spring emptied into a basin, situated down the slope towards the river and this supplied the family.

The 69 hectares / 170 acres of land at Ellisland, rented at £50 per annum for the first three years and seventy for the remainder of the lease, were neglected, stony, infertile, poorly dressed and badly drained. It had an orchard and Burns had 9 or 10 cows, including 3 fine Ayrshire cows; 4 horses and some pet sheep. The Ayrshire dairying system was introduced and cheese including ewe-milk cheese was made and crops such as oats were grown.

The first years' crop was to be his and the first payment of rent was not until Martimass. Burns kept two men and two women servants.

Burns is said to have been the first to introduce Ayrshire cattle to Dumfriesshire and other farmers soon followed his lead once the significantly higher milk yield became apparent.

=== Departure from Ellisland ===
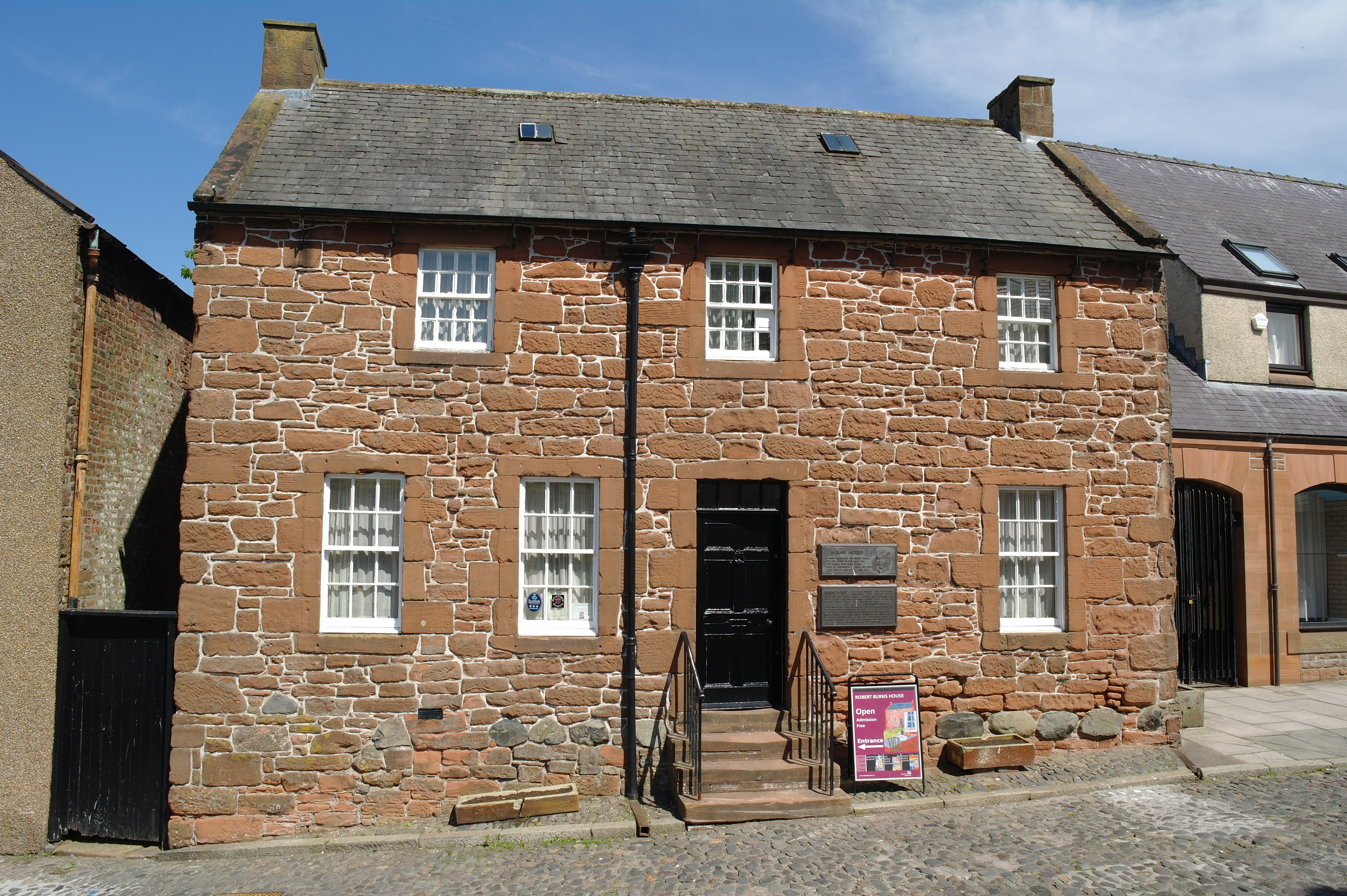
Burns's house in Dumfries

Burns switched from arable farming to dairying and then decided to give up the farm altogether as his career in the Excise looked more remunerative. For two years Burns worked as both a farmer and an exciseman, having received his excise commission on 14 July 1788. He had to ride two hundred miles a week to carry out his excise duties and had also to labour in the fields. In early 1790 the annual rent rose to £90 and Burns decided to give up his lease.

The Ayrshiremen who had advised Burns were little acquainted with the local soils, with the required manures, with the local markets, etc. These friends had estimated his rental at Ayrshire rates, so contrary to his landlord's good intentions, Burns may have ended up paying more rental for Ellisland than Ellisland could produce. By the end of 1790 Burns had decided that Ellisland was 'altogether a ruinous business'.

Burns auctioned his crops, getting a Guinea an acre, on 25 August. At Martinmas, 11 November 1791, the Burns family left Ellisland Farm and moved into the town of Dumfries six miles (10 km) away. About thirty people had attended the auction or roup and the levels of drunkenness led to Burns recording that Such a scene of drunkenness was hardly ever seen in this country.

=== Ellisland after Burns (1791–1921) ===
Patrick Miller sold the farm outright for £1900 to John Morin of Laggan, the adjacent property. In 1805 Morin sold Ellisland to a Mr Taylor who dismantled and remodelled the steading, although the farmhouse is much as it was in Burns's time. The parlour is thought to have remained unchanged. Burns's favourite line from Pope An honest man's the noblest work of God, was engraved on a window pane, although this was vandalised with a piece of flint about March 1876. Ellisland was farmed until 1921.

== The Ellisland Poetry, Songs and Letters ==
After meeting and befriending Captain Francis Grose (1731–91) at Friars' Carse, Burns agreed to write a poem in exchange for the author including Kirk Alloway in his new book on Scottish Antiquities. Burns's poem was his self-avowed masterpiece Tam o'Shanter, sent to Francis Grose on 1 December 1790; appearing in The Edinburgh Magazine in March 1791 and in Grose's second volume of his Antiquities a month later.

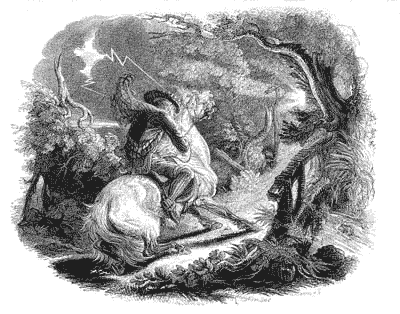
Tam o'Shanter wearing his bonnet and sitting astride his horse Meg

Burns's Auld Lang Syne was written at Ellisland, the first version being sent to Mrs Dunlop on 17 December 1788. Burns said in a letter to Mrs Dunlop: ... is not the Scotch phrase Auld lang syne exceedingly expressive? There is an old song and tune which has often thrilled through my soul. You know I am an enthusiast in old Scotch songs. I shall give you the verses on the other sheet... Light be the turf on the breast of the heaven-inspired poet who composed this glorious fragment! There is more of the fire of native genius in it than in half a dozen of modern English Bacchanalians.

During his relatively short stay at Ellisland, Burns wrote over 130 songs and poems, which amounts to about a quarter of his total output. He was working as an exciseman and a farmer but he also managed to write around 230 letters, his total extant letters amounting to 700 letters. The drinking song Willie Brew'd a Peck o'Maut was written during this time, set to music by Allan Masterton.

William Lorimer was a farmer, living two miles (3 km) away from Ellisland at Kemmishall or Kemys Hall. William's daughter Jean (1775–1808) was a frequent visitor to Ellisland and Burns wrote about twenty-four songs for this lass of the lintwhite locks. These songs were amongst his finest and he often referred to Jean under the poetic monica of Chloris.

In the stack yard Burns composed Mary in Heaven.

Burns wrote many passionate letters to Mrs Agnes Craig McLehose, his 'Clarinda'. Agnes, known as Nancy to her friends, was married and Nancy met Burns at a tea-party in 1787. The pair were instantly attracted to each other and for a time they met frequently, talked and wrote letters to one another using the names 'Clarinda' for Nancy and 'Sylvander' for Burns. The love affair played itself out in letters written between December 1787 and December 1791. Robert's passion for Clarinda inspired one of his most famous love songs, 'Ae Fond Kiss'.

Burns wrote On seeing a Wounded Hare limp by me, which a Fellow had just shot after James Thomson, son of a local farmer, had shot a hare out of season. This was against the established country code and Burns was enraged to the point that the perpetrator felt that he was about to be thrown into the river.

Robert sent his brother-in-law Adam Armour to Ellisland Farm in November 1791 to smash every window in the farm upon which he had inscribed verses by way of revenge upon James Morin, Laird of Laggan who was the new owner. Robert felt cheated over the price paid for a heap of manure, a valuable commodity before artificial fertilisers were available. No record of the verses has survived.

== The Hermitage ==
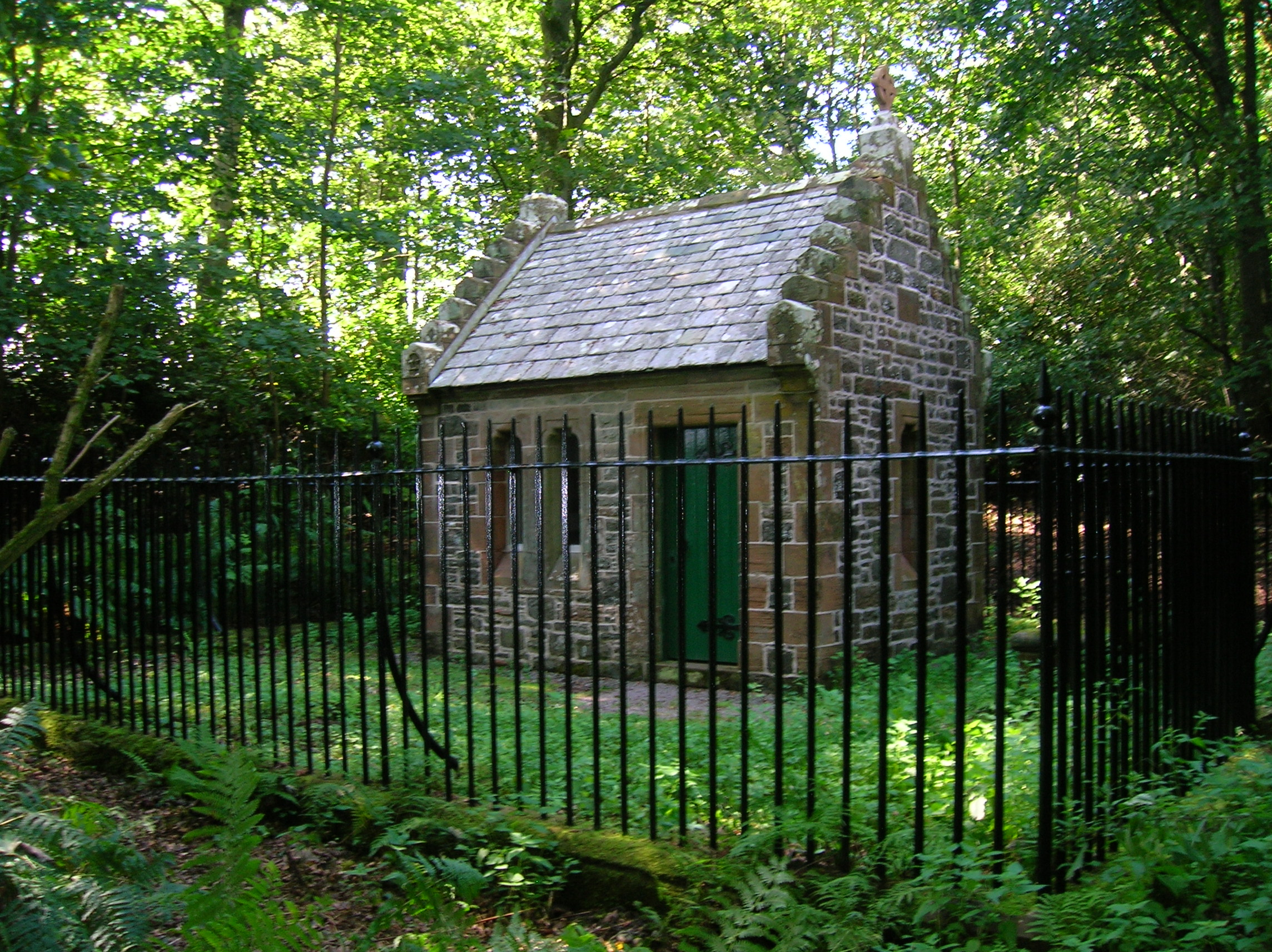
The Hermitage, Friar's Carse

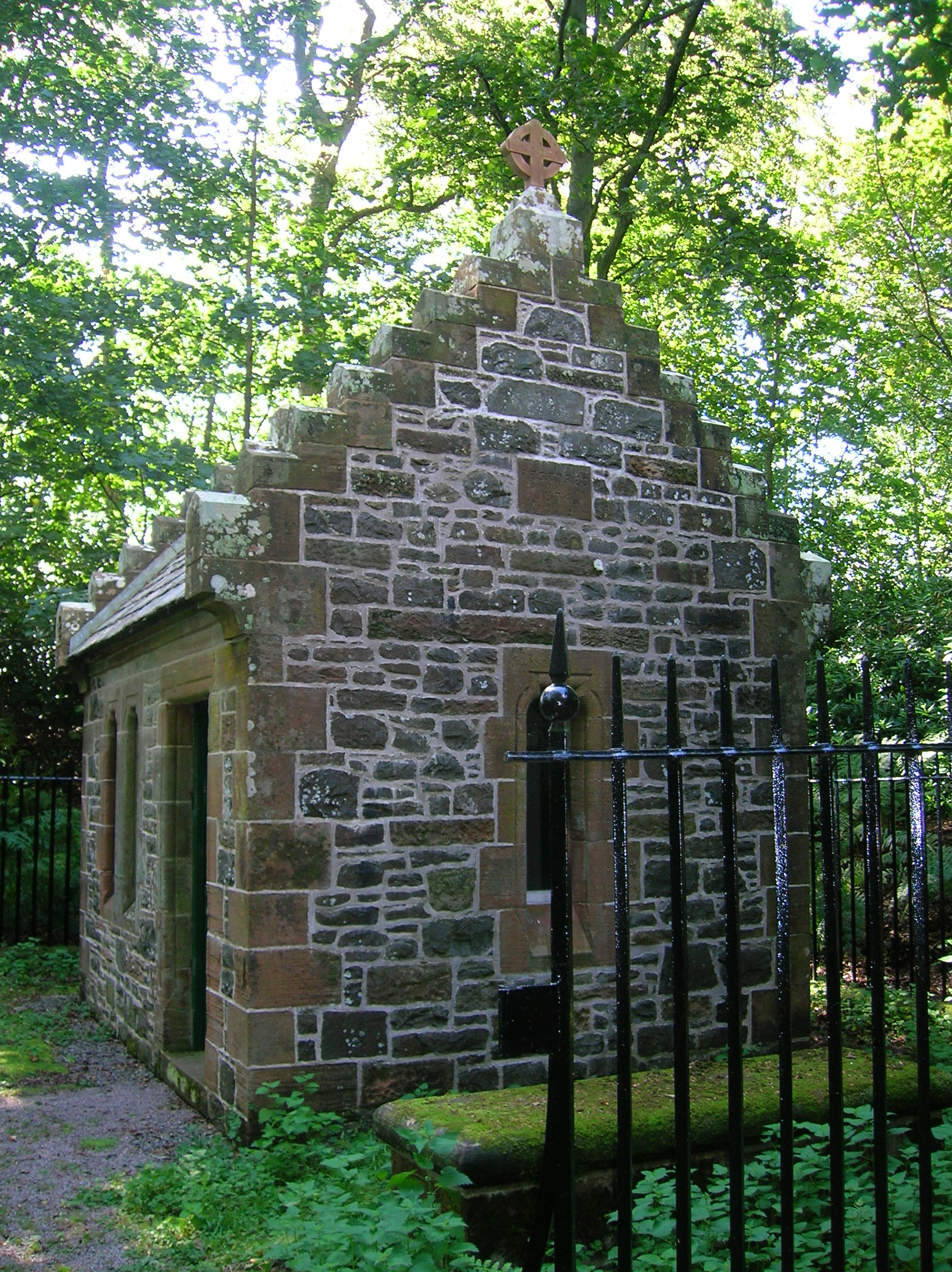
Burns's Hermitage

Robert Burn's neighbour to his north was Captain Robert Riddell of Glenriddel, who lived at Friar's Carse, and had built a small summer house called the 'Hermitage' in a secluded part of his estate, just a few fields away from Ellisland. Burns often used the building in this idyllic setting for writing poetry, having been given the key and apparently also enjoying drinking sessions with Robert Riddell. Although the original building no longer exists, Mr Nelson of Friars' Carse built another 'Hermitage' on the same site in the 19th century. The building was recently (2009) restored again and now has interpretation boards detailing its history.

Burns had written the lines on the Hermitage window:

"Thou whom chance may hither lead,
Be thou clad in russet weed,
Be thou deckt in silken stole,
Grave these counsels on thy soul.

Life is but a day at most,
Sprung from night – in darkness lost;
Hope not sunshine ev'ry hour,
Fear not clouds will always lour."

The original was preserved and is now in the Ellisland Farm museum. The new building's window had the same lines inscribed upon it, however they are now in the Friars' Carse hotel and the Hermitage's windows have no inscription. Friars' Carse at one time held the original Burns manuscripts The Whistle and Lines Written in the Hermitage. In April 1791 Burns completed a collection of his letters for Robert Riddel's library and these have become known as the Glenriddell Manuscripts.

== Micro-history ==
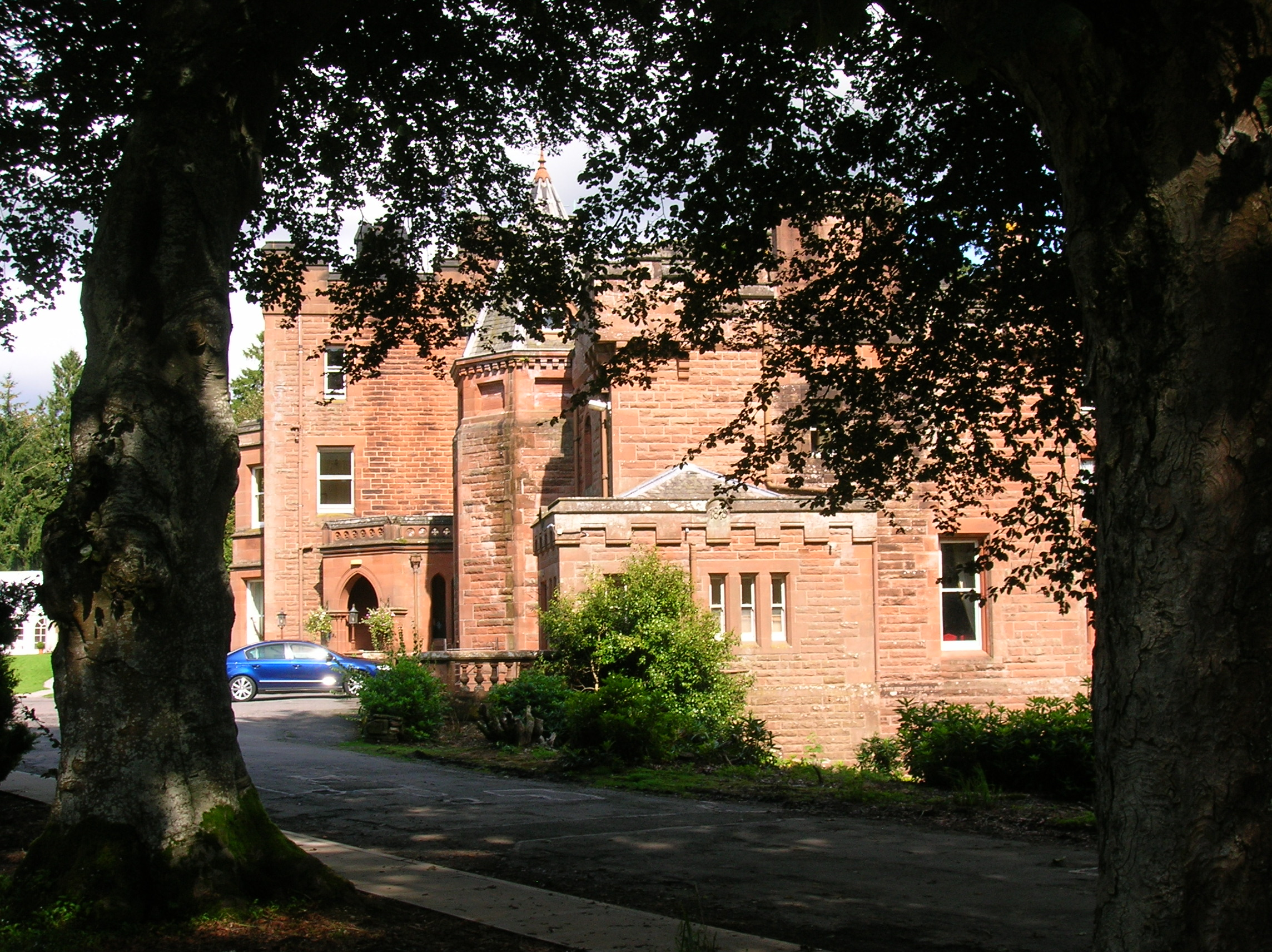
Friars' Carse

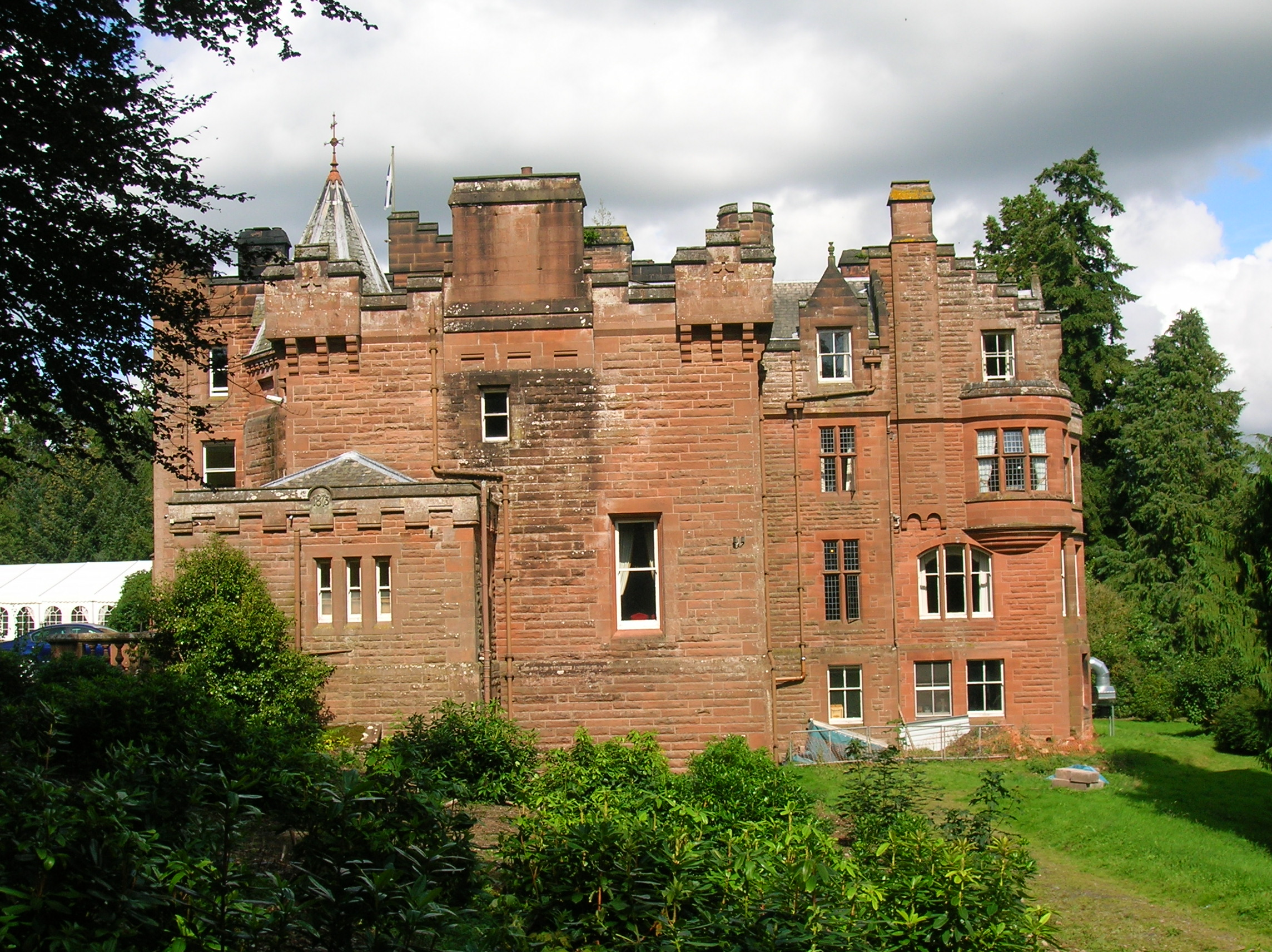
Friars' Carse

The lands of Ellisland had belonged to the Red Comyn and later to Robert the Bruce. To the north was a site reputed to have been an encampment built by the Roman general Agricola. Burns used the pseudonym 'Agricola' for radical poetry he published in the press, the authorship of which, as an exciseman, he obviously wished to keep secret.

On 16 October 1789 at Friar's Carse, Burns was a witness to a famous drinking contest where the participants set out to see who could be the last man able to blow a whistle. The winner was to have an old ebony Whistle as the trophy; the event was immortalised in the poem The Whistle. The winner was able to consume five bottles of claret.

On 14 October 1788 Robert Burns is said to have witnessed the trials of Patrick Miller's paddle driven steamboat on the nearby Dalswinton Loch in the company of Sandy Crombie, who was a local builder working at Ellisland. They were amongst a number of others and were not actually on board. This trial was especially significant, being the first use of power from an engine for human transportation anywhere in the World.

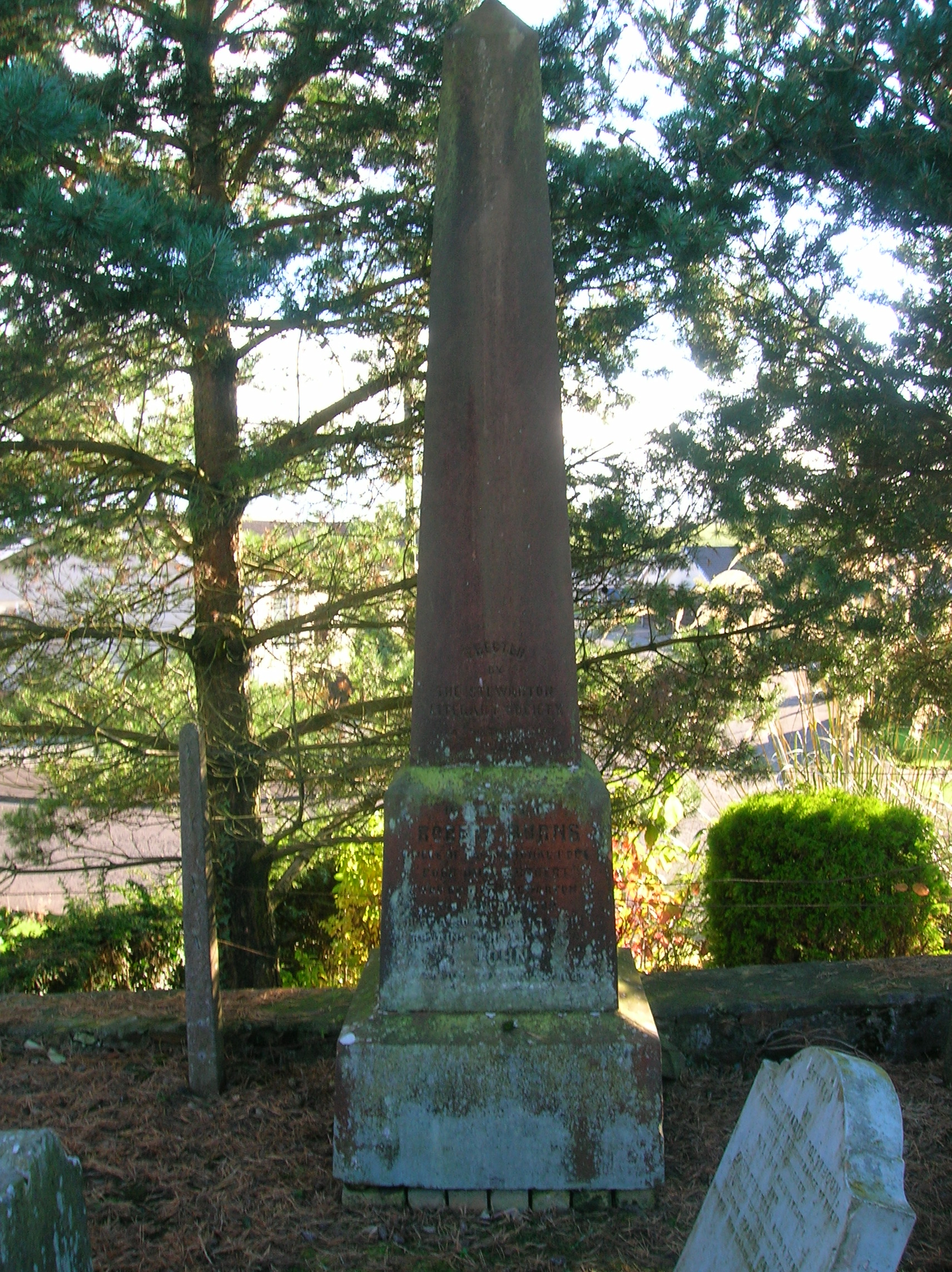
Memorial to Robert Burness, Burn's uncle, at Stewarton

Robert Burns and Robert Riddell set up the Monkland Friendly Society at Dunscore and organised and censored its library of 150 volumes. Riddell was the President and Burns was the secretary of the society that met on every fourth Saturday.

Patrick Miller was the first to introduce the turnips – Swedes from Sweden to Scotland, as well as the introduction of the threshing mill and the drill plough to Scotland.

Whilst at Ellisland Burns attended the Rev. William Inglis's Church in Dumfries; as he put it "I go to hear Mr Inglis because he preaches what he believes and practices what he preaches".

Cuthbertson records that Robert Burness, the poet's uncle, died at Ellisland in January 1789. His daughter, Fanny Burness was taken care of by Burns and eventually married one of Jean Armour's brothers. Uncle Robert lived in the Kilmaurs and Stewarton area for many years and is commemorated in the churchyard.

Burns apparently left his favourite putting stone at Ellisland and if he saw anyone using it he would call "Bide a wee" and join in the sport, always proving that he was the strongest man there.

In 1791 Janet Little, author of The Poetical Works of Janet Little, The Scotch Milkmaid visited Burns at Ellisland on the day he fell from his horse and broke an arm.

== Ellisland Farm Museum ==
Until 1921 Ellisland was farmed, at which point it was purchased by John Wilson, former President of Edinburgh Burns Club, who gave it to the nation. From 1929, Ellisland Farm was maintained by the Ellisland Trustees, with the support of local volunteers known as the Friends of Ellisland. The Robert Burns Ellisland Trust was established in 2020 as an independent charity, replacing the previous 1920s trust, and cares for Ellisland.

Visitors can explore the eighteenth-century farmstead. On display are a number of artefacts relating to the poet and his family, from manuscripts to wife Jean's milking stool. The kitchen contains part of the range used by Jean Burns as well as the Carron oven installed for her by Burns.

The old Granary and other outbuildings were opened in 1979 as a museum of farming life. An audio-visual display is located in the Granary and there are riverside walks which are said to have inspired Burns during his most productive years. A fine collection of vintage agricultural implements and tools, collected from all over Scotland, are located in the various farm buildings. The farm's land is let for grazing.

=== Views of Ellisland Farm ===
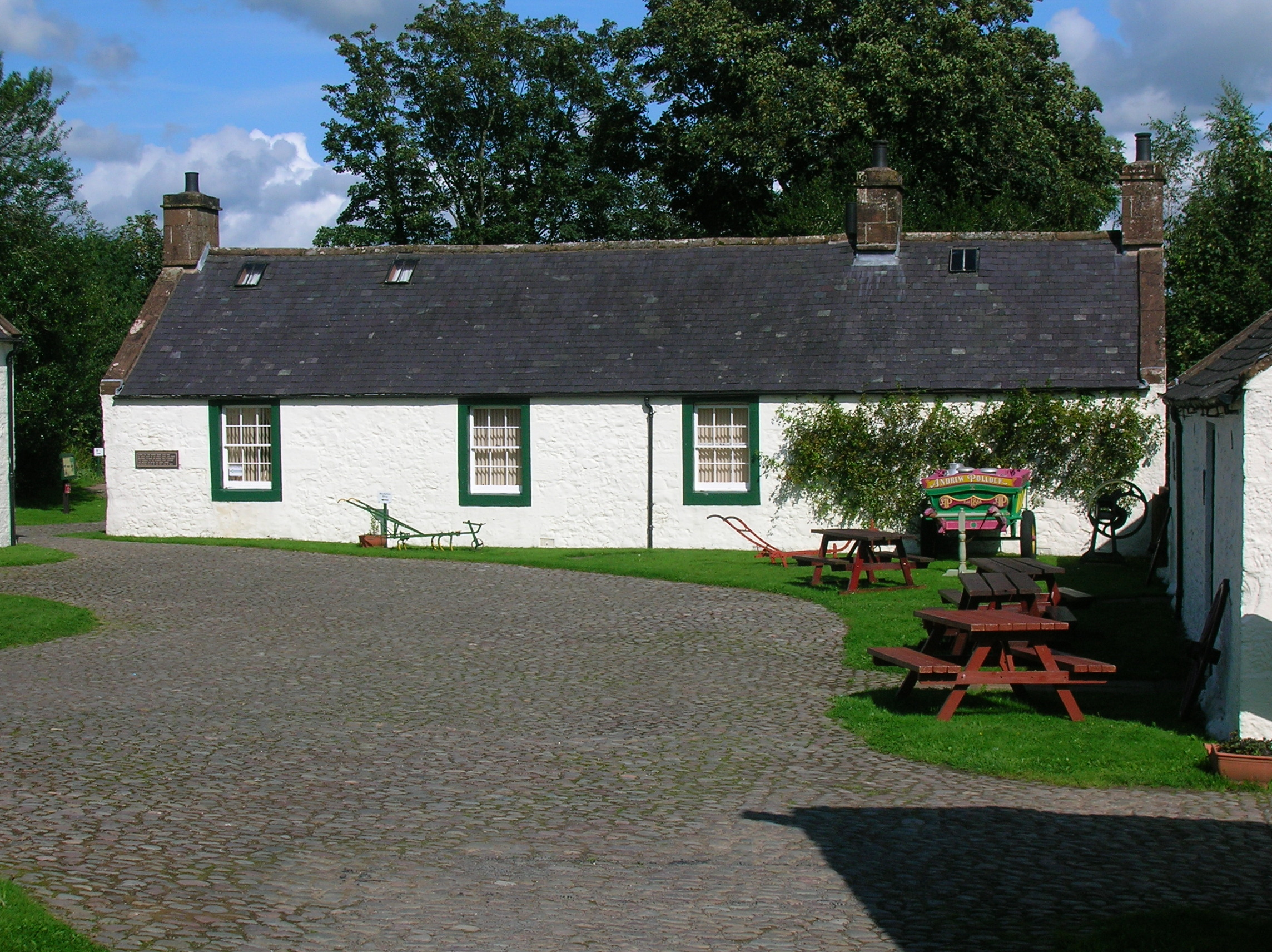
The farmhouse

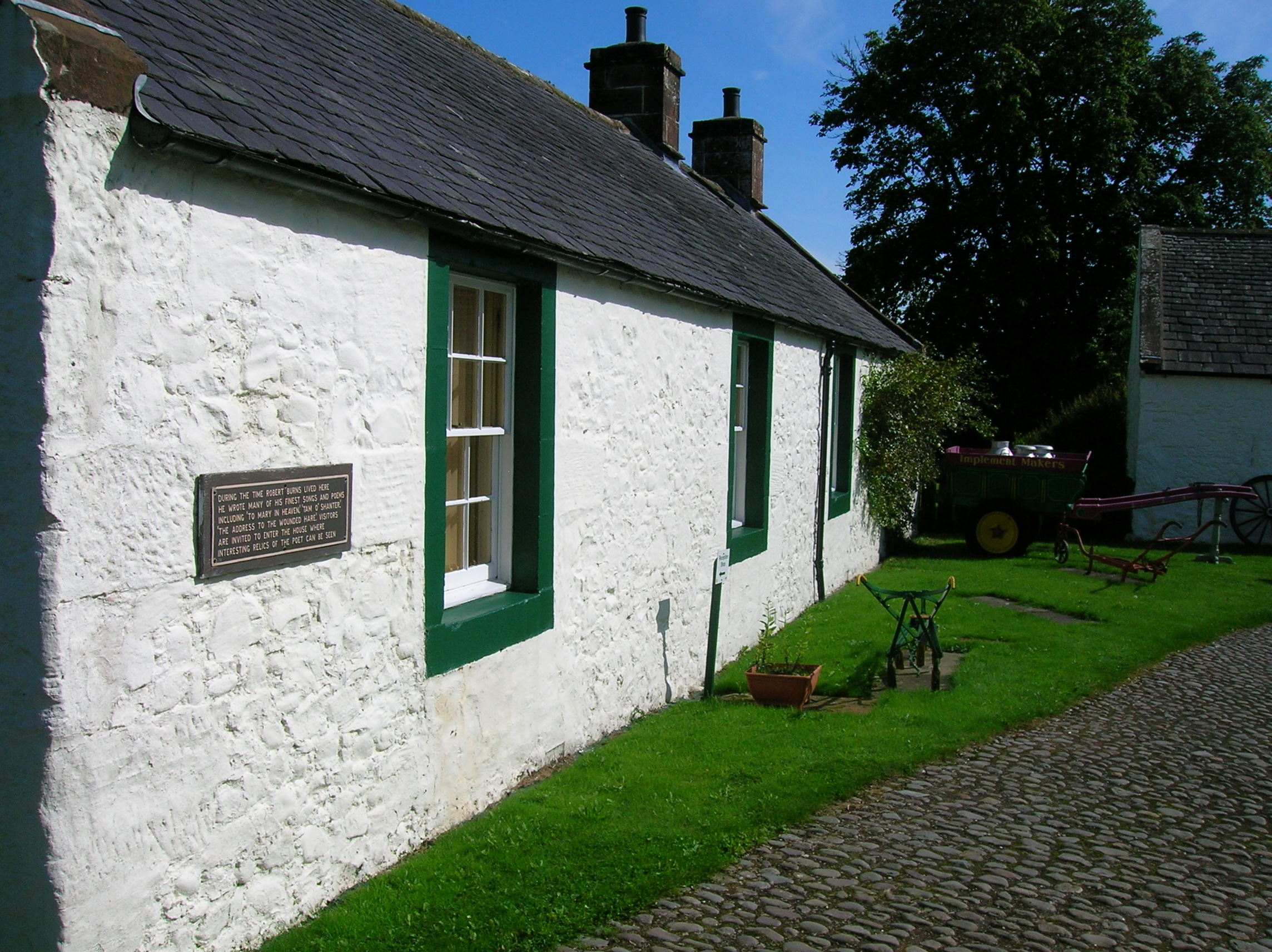
The frontage of the farmhouse

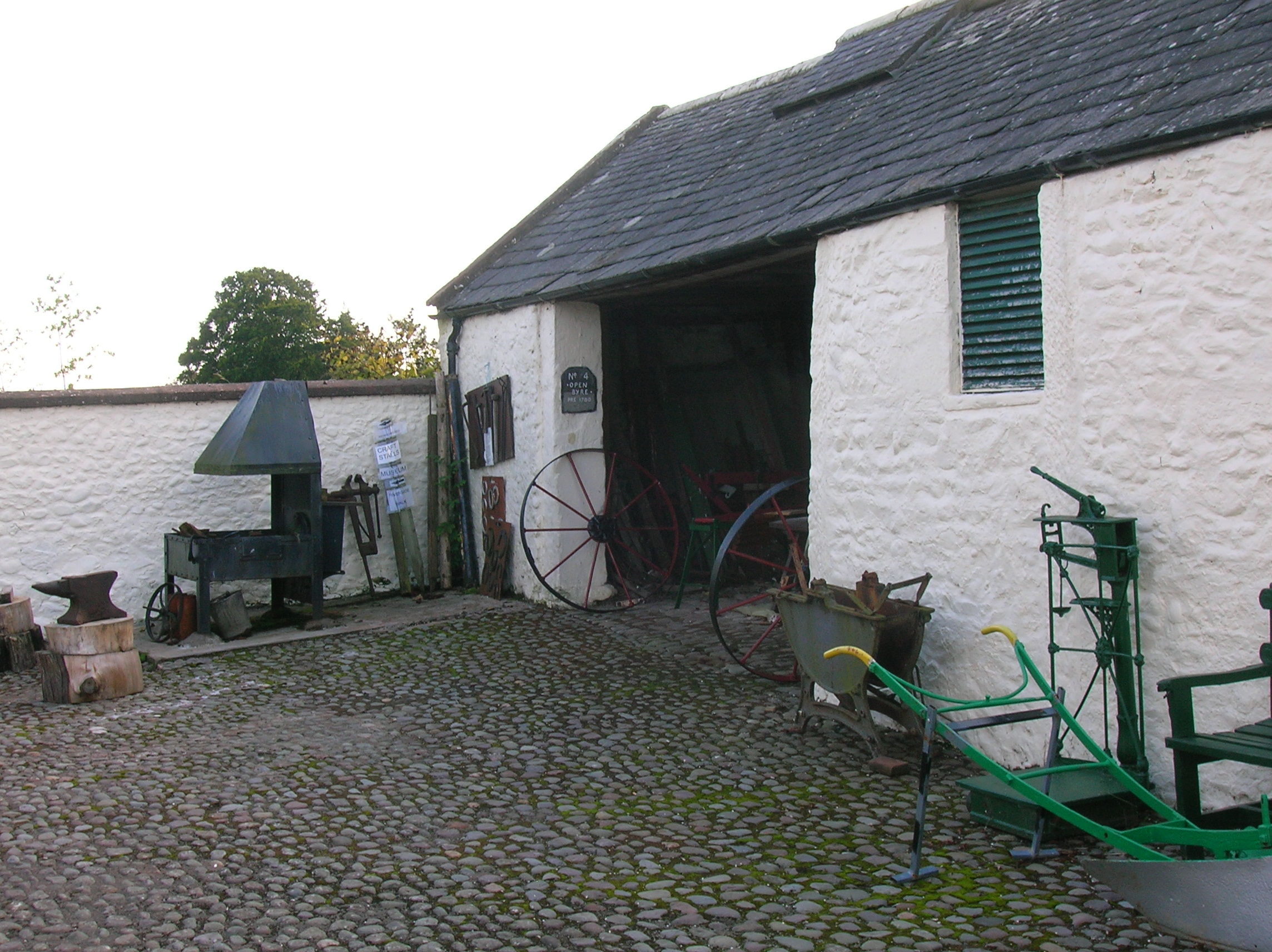
Open shed workshop

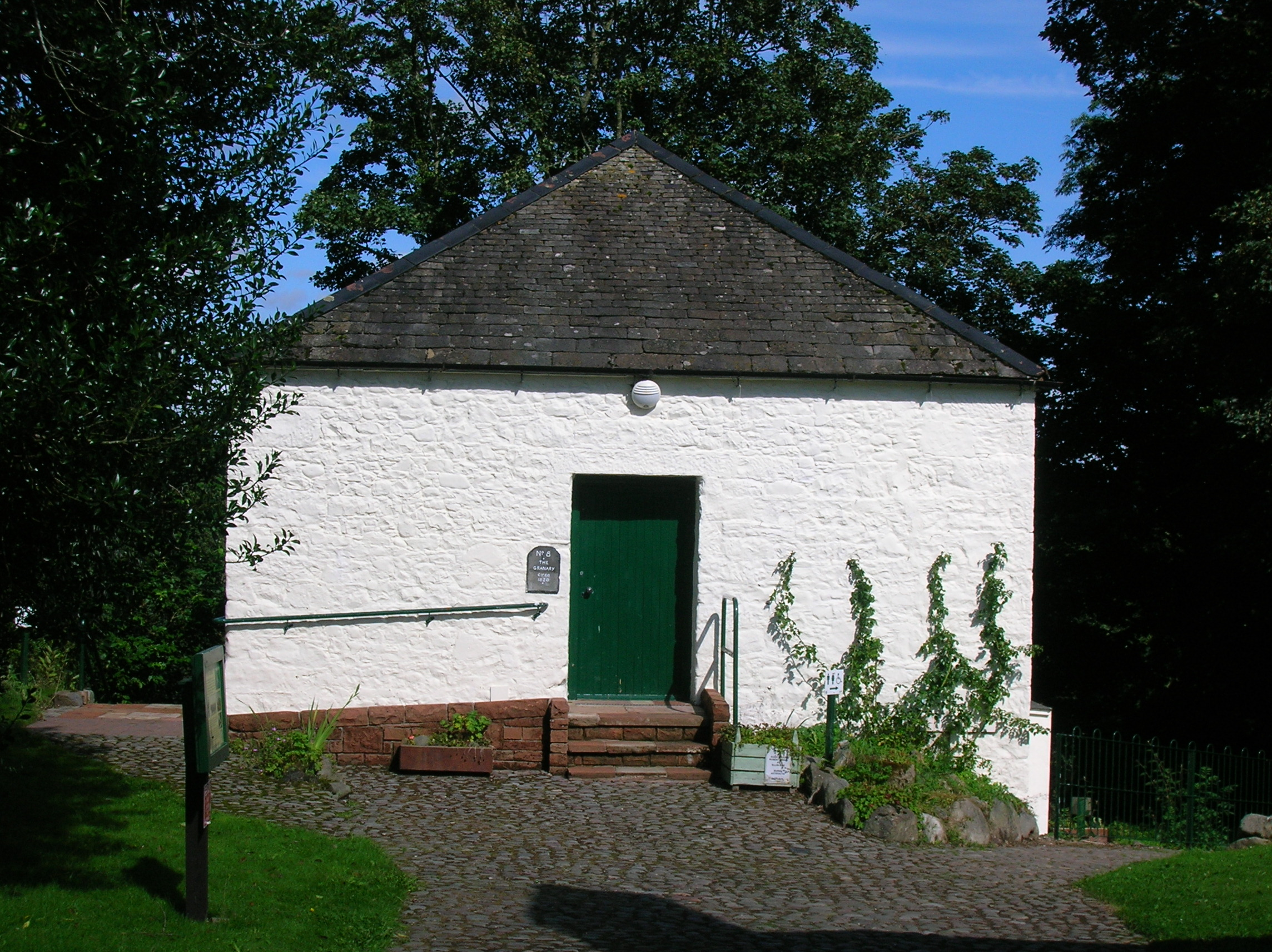
The Granary housing the audio-visual presentation

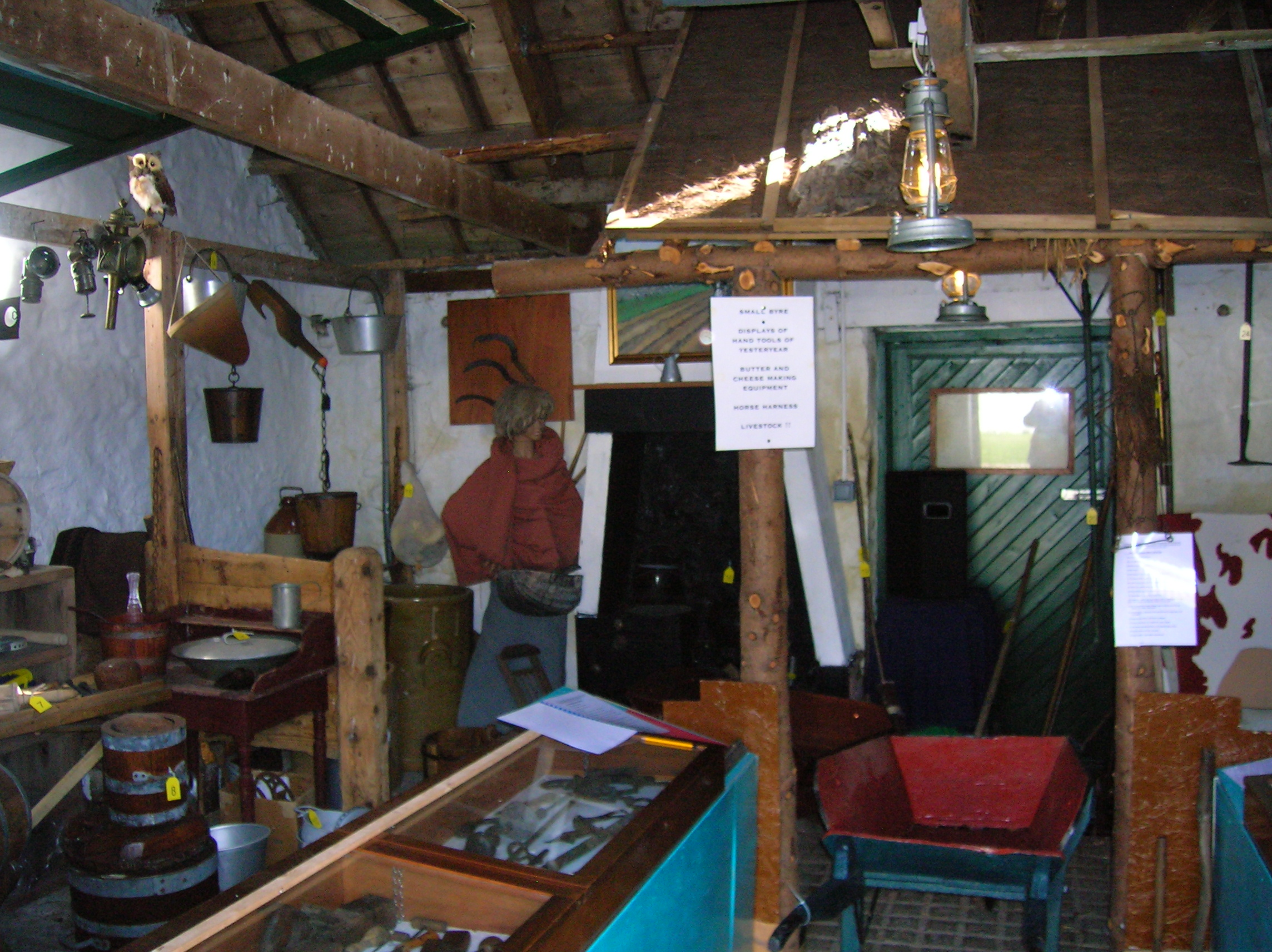
A farm museum exhibition area

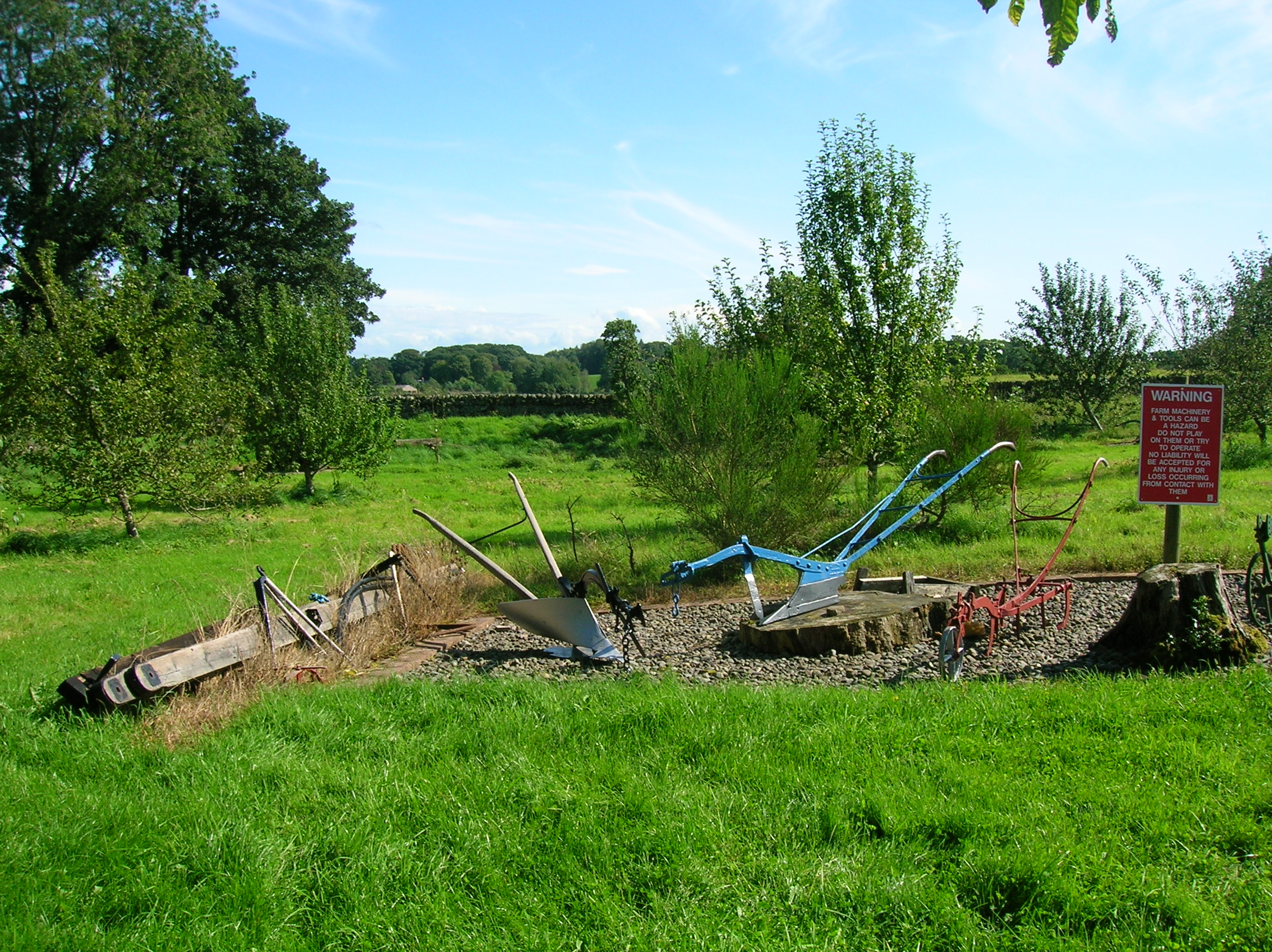
The orchard

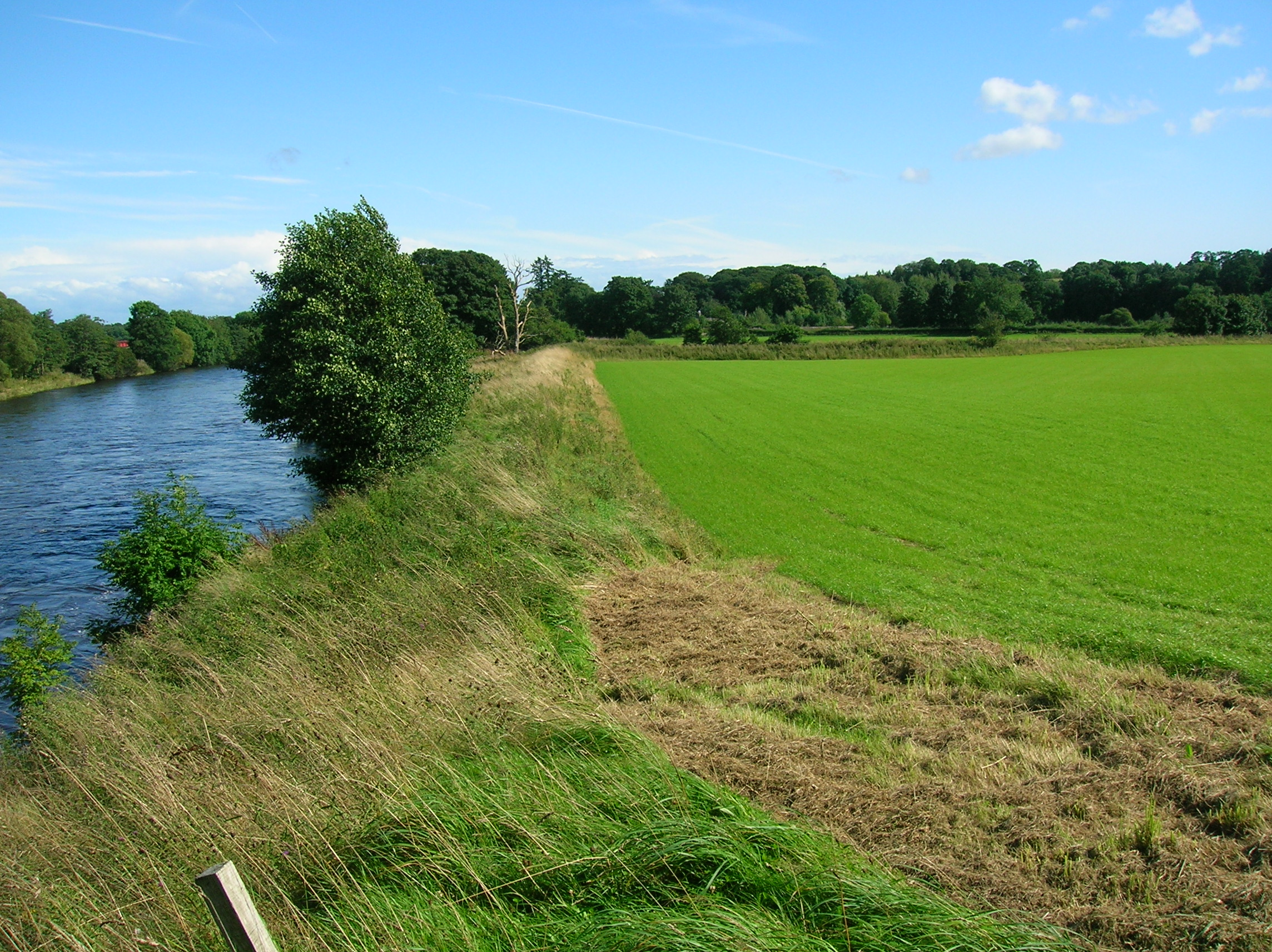
The River Nith and an Ellisland Farm field

== In popular culture ==
A group from the University of Glasgow would recreate Ellisland Farm in Minecraft in collaboration with the Robert Burns Ellisland Trust and the South of Scotland Destination Alliance with funding from the Tourism Leadership and Recovery Fund.

== See also ==
- Dalgarnock Village, Church and Parish
- Robert Graham of Fintry
