= Bob Graham (disambiguation) =

Bob Graham (1936–2024) was an American politician and author.

Bobby or Bob Graham may also refer to

- Bob Graham (author/illustrator) (born 1942), Australian author and illustrator
- Bob Graham (ice hockey) (born 1947), Canadian retired professional ice hockey player and coach
- Bob Graham (New South Wales politician) (born 1943)
- Bob Graham (rugby union) (1936–2021), New Zealand rugby union player and coach
- Bob Graham (Tasmanian politician) (born 1942)

== See also ==
- Bob Graham Round, the English Lakeland fell-runner
- Robert Graham (disambiguation)
- Bobby Graham (disambiguation)
