= Robert Graham (colonel) =

Robert Graham or Grimes (died 1701), was a Scottish colonel in the English Army and later a Trappist monk.

Graham was the son of a certain 'Colonel' William Grimes. He is described in the contemporary letters of Edward Montagu, 2nd Earl of Manchester, as a Lieutenant in the cavalry under John Graham, 1st Viscount Dundee, who was afterwards commander on Bass Rock, later a recipient of Jacobite bounty in Edinburgh, and (in 1701) an alleged conspirator against the life of King William III of England. He had two sons, both notorious libertines who turned monks, the elder becoming a Capuchin friar as Brother Archangel, the younger a Trappist, Brother Alexis.

The life of the younger was a stormy one. Graham had been whipped in his boyhood by a Presbyterian tutor for attending a Catholic service in Edinburgh, which led to his being transferred to the guardianship of a kinsman, the Earl of Perth; but when that nobleman's affairs became involved he passed into the hands of a Presbyterian uncle, whose harsh asceticism no doubt influenced his later life. His name cannot be traced with certainty in the military entry books in the Public Record Office, but he appears to have served in Flanders under King William. His excesses are said to have startled London, Flanders, and Paris, and when he left the service and was presented to King James II of England at the English royal court in exile at the Château de Saint-Germain-en-Laye in France, he was one of the most accomplished scoundrels of his day.

After alternate fits of rioting and fasting, of drinking and religion, Graham entered the Abbey of La Grande Trappe, and became so noted for his mortification of the flesh that he may be said virtually to have committed suicide. Before he died it was the custom of English courtiers serving either king to visit the recluse, to whose cell King James and bevies of court ladies would often go. His death, early in 1701, deprived the English court of one of its most edifying distractions.
