= Robert Graham (footballer, born 1884) =

Scottish footballer

Personal information
- Full name: Robert Graham
- Date of birth: 31 July 1884
- Place of birth: Camelon, Scotland
- Date of death: 31 May 1916 (aged 31)
- Place of death: HMS Invincible, North Sea
- Position: Inside right

Youth career
- Camelon Juveniles
- Laurieston Juniors
- Falkirk Juniors

Senior career*
Years	Team	Apps	(Gls)
1904–1908	Falkirk	11	(0)
1907–1908	→ Cowdenbeath (loan)	8	(0)
1910–1911	East Stirlingshire		
- * Club domestic league appearances and goals

Robert Graham (31 July 1884 – 31 May 1916) was a Scottish professional footballer who played in the Scottish League for Falkirk and Cowdenbeath as an inside right.

== Personal life ==
Graham worked as an engineer at Sharp & Sons Engineers, Camelon. Prior to the First World War, he married the daughter of one of the directors of Leicester Fosse. Graham enlisted in the Royal Navy c. 1909 and served on HMS Roxburgh, before attending a torpedo school. In 1912, he was attached to HMS Invincible and rose to become a chief petty officer. During the First World War, Graham saw action on the Invincible at the battles of the Falkland Islands and Jutland. He was killed in action during the latter engagement, when the Invincible was destroyed by a magazine explosion. Graham is commemorated on the Portsmouth Naval Memorial.

== Career statistics ==
Appearances and goals by club, season and competition
Club	Season	League			Scottish Cup		Total	
Club	Season	Division	Apps	Goals	Apps	Goals	Apps	Goals
Falkirk	1904–05	Scottish Second Division	8	0	0	0	8	0
Falkirk	1905–06	Scottish First Division	3	0	0	0	3	0
Falkirk	Total		11	0	0	0	11	0
Cowdenbeath	1907–08	Scottish First Division	8	0	1	0	9	0
Career total			19	0	1	0	20	0

== Honours ==
Falkirk

- East of Scotland League: 1904–05
