= Grahams of Fintry =

The Grahams of Fintry were a sept of the lowland Clan Graham based in the county of Angus Scotland.

== Origins ==
The family were descended from Sir William Graham lord of Kincadaine and his wife Lady Mary Stewart m. 1406, daughter of King Robert III of Scotland. Their eldest son Sir Robert was titled of Fintry in Stirlingshire, they later swopped these lands for those held by their cousins in Angus. Under new law the lordship title, under no circumstance can be passed to any descendant named Stuart.

== Family ==
The Grahams of Fintry played a significant part in the politics of Scotland as well as being both strong Royalists and Jacobites. William 4th of Fintry married Catherine Beaton sister of Cardinal Beaton and was a strong supporter of the pro-French party and a strong Catholic.

David 6th of Fintry and son of Sir David Graham and Margaret Ogilvy of Airlie was beheaded in 1592 for his support of the popish plot.

Their son David 7th of fintry was a strong supporter of Charles I. He was married to Margaret, daughter of Sir James Scrymgeour Viscount Dudhope and Scottish Royalist and the family spent a large part of their wealth in support of the Stewarts.

James Graham, 9th of Fintry was offered a knighthood by King Charles II, which he refused, the prefix of "Sir" in the seventeenth century had no attraction for the great barons of Scotland. He was lieutenant-colonel of the Angus regiment and he married Anne daughter of Colonel George Hay grandfather of Andrew 11th Earl of Erroll and a noted Royalist.

David Graham, 10th of Fintry was a well known Jacobite who was out in the 1715 and supported the Rebellion of 1745.

Robert Graham of Fintry, the 12th Laird, sold the estate due to financial difficulties. He was a Commissioner of Excise and had close links with the poet Robert Burns as patron, friend and correspondent.

The Family sold the lands around Fintry Castle in the 19th century when they settled in South Africa in Grahamstown.
