= Robert Graham of Fintry =

Robert Graham, 12th Laird of Fintry
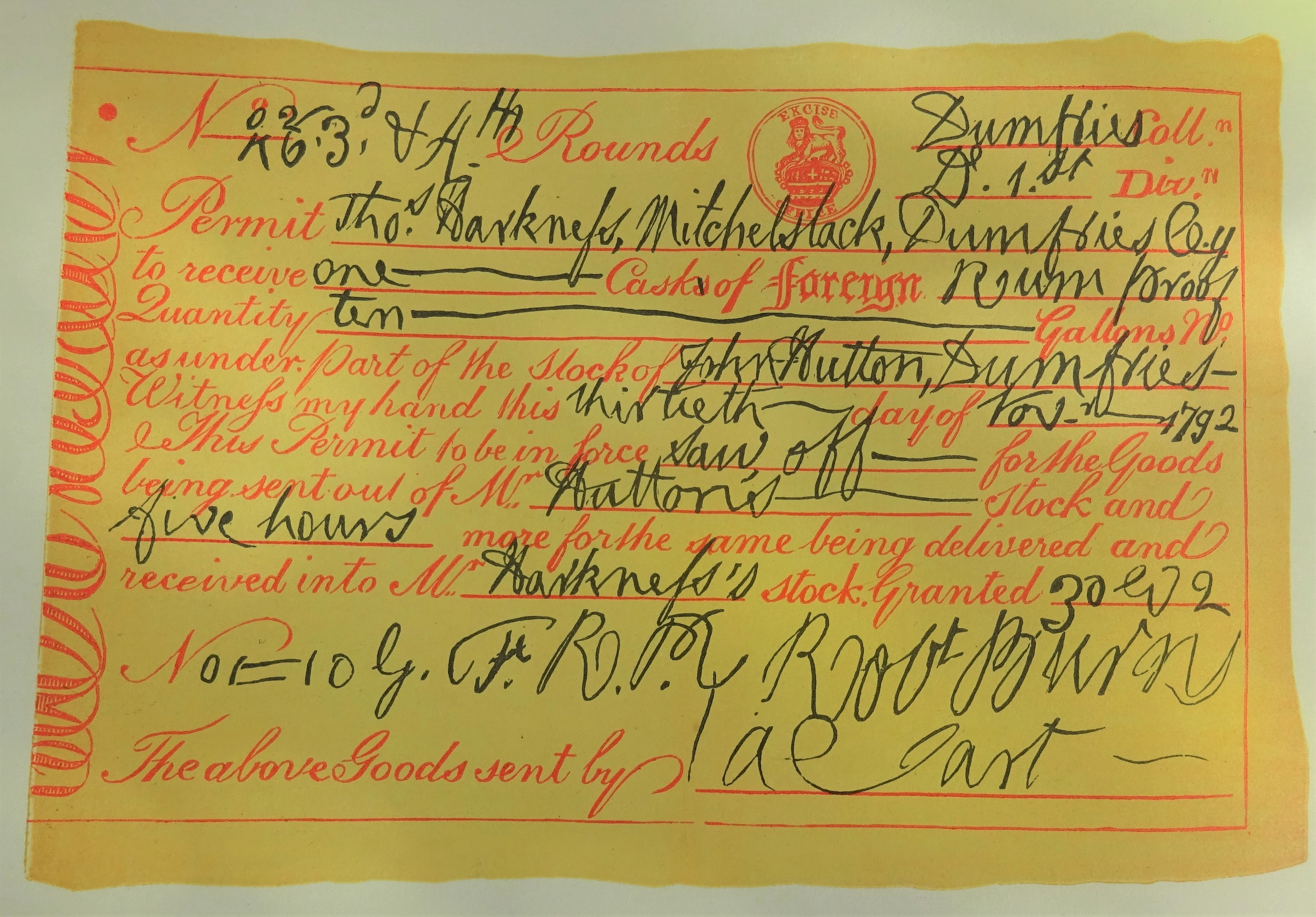
- An Excise Permit completed by Robert Burns.
- Born: 17 January 1749; Fintry
- Died: 10 January 1815
- Occupation: Commissioner of Excise

Robert Graham of Fintry (1749-1815) was the 12th Laird of Fintry near Dundee and was one of Robert Burns's most supportive patrons, correspondent and loyal associate. Appointed a Commissioner of the Scottish Board of Excise he assisted Burns with his Excise career and during his 'loyalty' difficulties. He was a great admirer of his poetry and Burns wrote several epistles to him. Burns referred to him as "Friend of my Life - True Patron of my Rhymes."

== Life and character ==
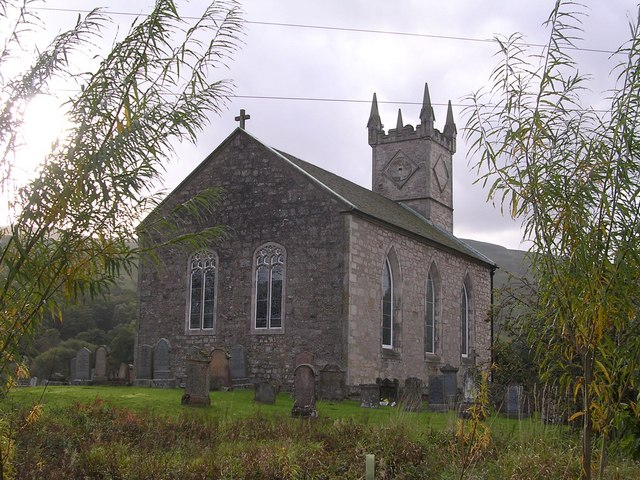
Fintry Parish Kirk

He was the son of Robert Graham, 11th Laird of Fintry who died in October 1756 when Robert junior was only seven. He was tutored and then educated in Haddington, followed by St Andrews University. In 1770 he took over and managed the family estate in the old county of Forfarshire until in 1780 he was forced to sell the property because of financial difficulties, although a condition of the sale was that he retained his title. For a time he was the factor to Archibald Douglas of Douglas and the Earl of Strathmore, managing their lands in Forfar and Perth. He was appointed in 1787 as a Commissioner of the Scottish Board of Excise.

On 12 April 1773 he married Margaret Elizabeth Mylne of Mylnfield, his second cousin, and the couple went on have no fewer than ten daughters and four sons. He died aged 65 in 1815. He was related to Sir Robert Graham of Strathcarron andJohn Graham, 1st Viscount Dundee, Bluidy Clavers, persecutor of the Covenanters. Graham was a Whig rather than a Tory and had Jacobite sentiments. His Edinburgh address was George Street.

A 1990s revelation is that Graham was in 1793 paid £26 6s 0d. from Henry Dundas's spy network funding to spread pro William Pitt propaganda. He wrote a series of letters to Robert Dundas about radical activists in the Dundee area where he ran a group of paid informers.

== Association with Robert Burns ==
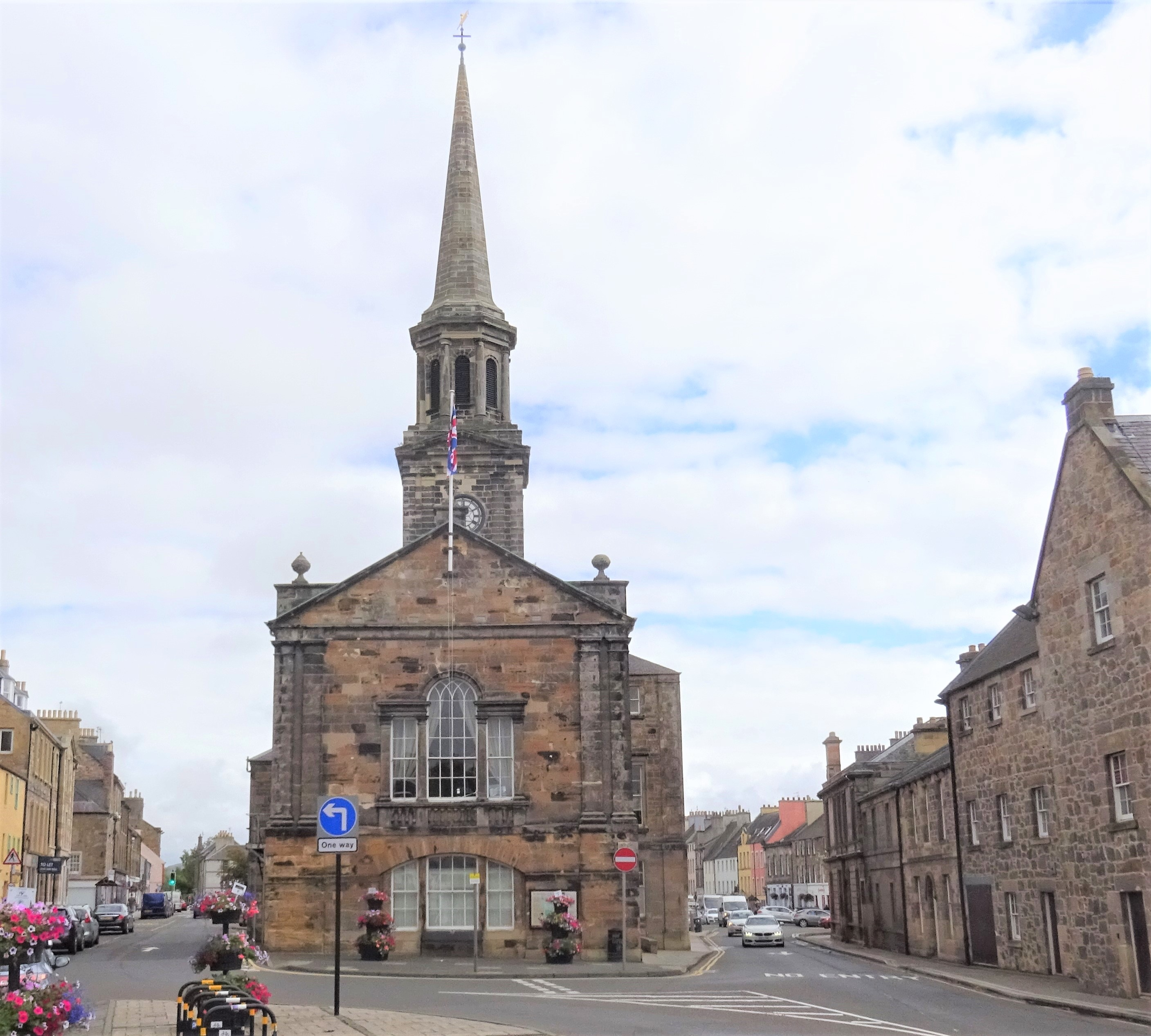
Haddington Town Hall.

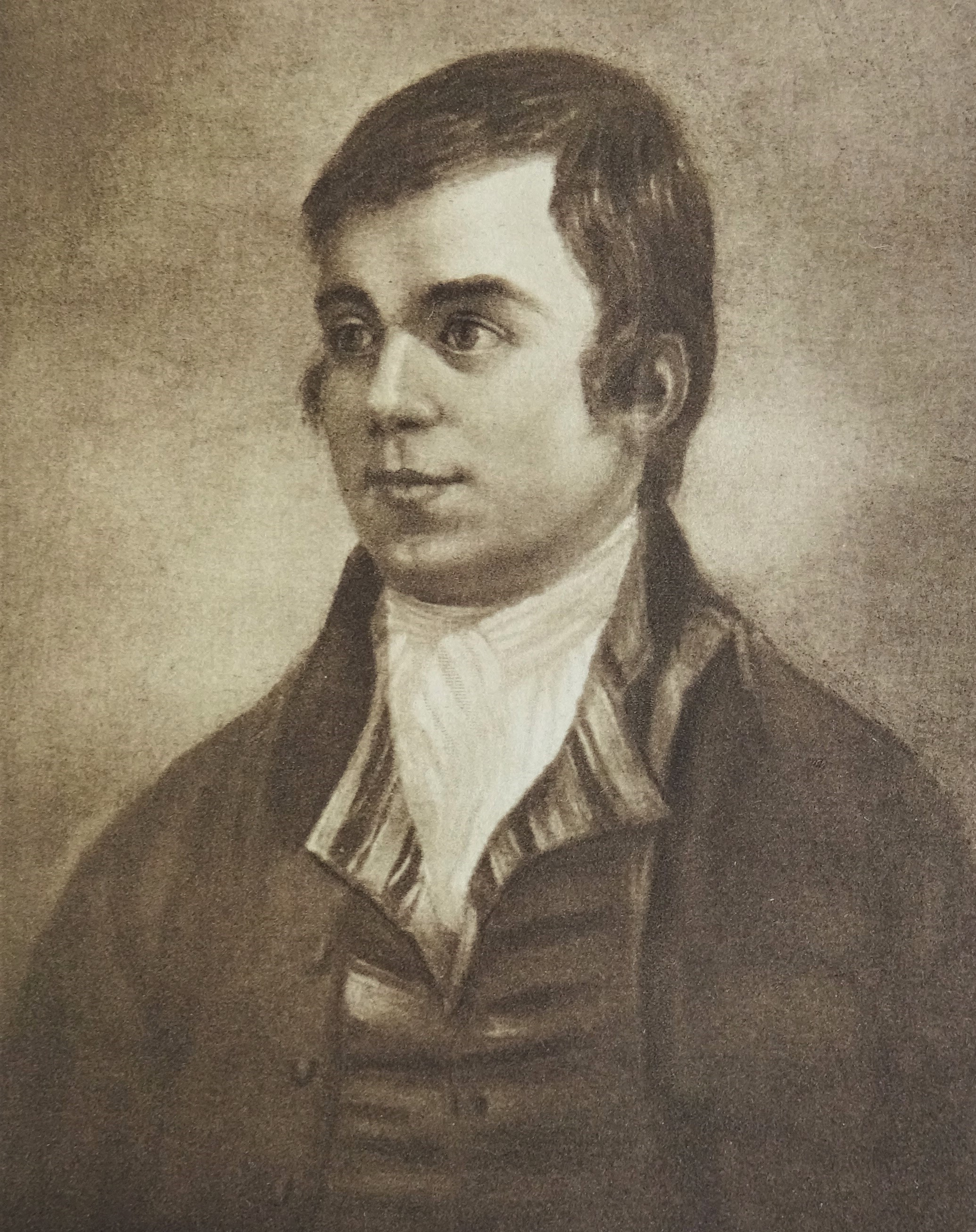
Robert Burns.

On 31 August 1787 Graham met Robert Burns in Blair Atholl at Athole House, seat of the Duke of Atholl whilst he was on his Highland Tour. In January 1788 Burns wrote to Graham requesting his patronage in his efforts to join the Excise and Graham gave his friend his full support. Later, when in December 1792 his loyalty to the crown was called into question, Graham gave him his support.

Burns's doctor in Edinburgh was 'Lang' Sandy Wood and he is said to intervened on the poet's behalf to Graham after the poet had confided his interest in joining the excise.

On 5 September 1787 Burns made his first mention of Graham in a letter to Josiah Walker. Burns described the experiences he had enjoyed at Athole House and one was "Mr Graham of Fintrie's charms of conversation".

Writing to Frances Dunlop on 2 August 1787 Burns said of Graham "Mr Graham of Fintry, one of the worthiest and most accomplished Gentlemen, not only of this Country, but I will dare say it, of this age."

Burns lost James Cunningham, Earl of Glencairn, as his principal patron due to his untimely passing in 1790 and then saw Graham as his main remaining supporter who wielded significant influence.

Burns commented that Graham was a "Friend of the Poet, Tried and Leal (loyal)." Burns sent Graham many manuscript copies of his poems and songs.

Burns's Excise training was due to take place in Edinburgh however Burns, probably assisted by Graham, had it transferred to Tarbolton. He had to pay his Ayr supervisor, George Johnston and Graham for elements of his training.

Burns in July 1789 confided in Graham that "I am deliberating whether I had not better give up farming altogether." By January 1790 he had made up his mind, making him entirely dependent on his Excise career and promotions, which he hoped his patron would assist him with.

In January 1794 Burns wrote to Graham suggesting the abolition of the Second Division of Excise. The war had resulted in a dramatic drop in imports and had lessened the Excise workload. He stated that he was concerned that no public servant should "eat the bread of idleness" but asked that he should not be revealed as the author of the suggestion.

Burns's second brief Galloway Tour in June 1794 has been seen as an attempt by him to find another patron other that Graham, who had not been able or was unwilling to find him promotion, although Graham was apparently working on a transfer to a Port Division. Patrick Heron of the Kirroughtree Estate near Newton Stewart was the personage who he hoped would assist him in his quest for promotion to Supervisor.

Graham in 1796 was unable to grant Burns's request to be placed back on full pay during his final illness and instead sent him a private donation of £5.

== Correspondence with Robert Graham and family ==
Around twenty letters survive from their correspondence. Burns's poetry sometimes covered controversial political topics and he clearly had great faith in Graham's friendship and tact. The letters are held by the Robert Burns Birthplace Museum in Alloway, South Ayrshire.

On 7 January 1788 Burns wrote to Graham regarding his application to join the Excise "I now solicit your Patronage. You know, I dare say, of an application I lately made to your Board, to be admitted an Officer of Excise. I have according to form, been examined by a Supervisor, and today I give in his Certificate with a request for an Order for instructions."

In September 1788, writing from Ellisland Farm, Burn's commented that he saw his appointment to the Excise "As my sheet anchor in life" and enclosed his "Epistle to Robert Fintry Esq., of Fintry."

On 10 September 1788 Burns wrote the following epistle "To Robert Graham of Fintry, Esq., with a request for an Excise Division":

"Why shrinks my soul, half-blushing, half-afraid,
Backward abash'd to ask thy friendly aid?
I know my need, I know thy giving hand,
I tax thy friendship at thy command."

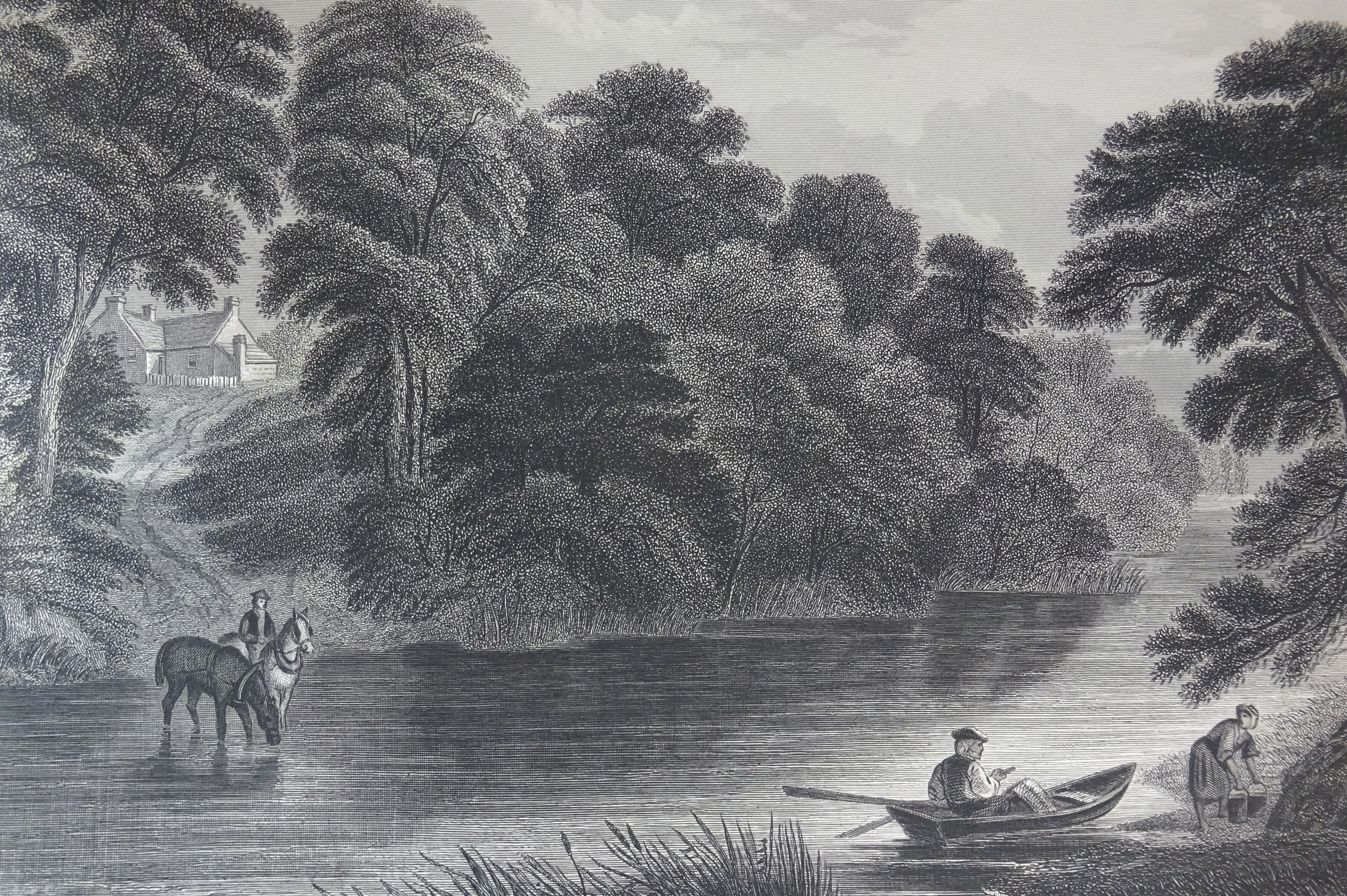
Ellisland Fam and the River Nith.

This epistle accompanied a letter to Graham telling him that his home, Ellisland Farm "does by no means promise to be such a Pennyworth as I was taught to expect". Burns also revealed that he had lent money to keep Gilbert and his sisters on a 'farm in Ayrshire' so he had no financial reserves to help him with Ellisland. Then he came to the crux of the letter: "There is one way by which I might be enabled to extricate myself from this embarrasment, a scheme which I hope and am certain is in your power to effectuate. I live here, Sir, in the very centre of a country Excise-Division; the present Officer lately lived on a farm which he rented in my nearest neighbourhood; and as the gentleman, owing to some legacies, is quite opulent, a removal could do him no manner of injury; and on a month's warning, to give me a little time to look again over my Instructions, I would not be afraid to enter on business. I do not know the name of his Division, as I have not yet got acquainted with any of the Dumfries Excise People; but his own name is Leonard Smith. It would suit me to enter on it, beginning of next Summer..."

Smith was moved, however Burns's machinations have been seen to portray the poet in the poor light of self-interest, however his experience of his father's trials and tribulations regarding farm leases and legal disputes would have preyed upon his mind. The final decision was however that of Collector Mitchell.

Burns was able to obtain the Excise area in which he lived against normal practice which was aimed at preventing local friendships developing. No Excise officer was usually employed who had more than two children which was not a problem at the times and he was still technically a bachelor. The age limit was thirty however Burns was twenty-nine.

One of the reasons for obtaining an Excise post was that the "roving life of a gauger would facilitate the collection of material for a Scottish drama he had then in contemplation."

Burns followed up on 1 September 1789 with "To Mr Graham of Fintry, On being appointed to my Excise Division.":

"I call no goddess to inspire my strains,
A fabled Muse may suit a Bard that feigns:
'Friend of my life!' my ardent spirit burns,
And all the tribute of my heart returns,
For boons accorded, goodness ever new,
The Gift still dearer, as the Giver You.

Burns wrote to Graham regarding his employment, saying; "I have found the Excise business go on a great deal smoother with me than I apprehended; owing a good deal to the generous friendship of Mr Mitchell, my Collector, and the kind assistance and instruction of Mr Findlater, my Supervisor - I dare to be honest, and I fear no labor."

Another comment shed light on his working practices; "I recorded every defaulter; but at the court, I myself begged off every poor body that was unable to pay, which seeming candour gave me so much implicit credit with the Hon. Bench that with high Compliments they gave me such ample vengeance on the rest that my Decreet is double the amount of any Division in the District."

"Epistle to Robert Graham Esq: of Fintry on the Election of the Dumfries string of Boroughs, Anno 1790":

Fintry, my stay in worldly strife,
Friend o' my Muse, Friend o' my Life,
Are ye as idle's I am?
Come then, wi' uncouth, kintra fleg,
O'er Pegasus I'll fling my leg,
And ye shall see me try him.

But where shall I go rin a ride,
That I may splatter nane beside?
I wad na be uncivil:
In manhood's various paths and ways
There's aye some doytin' body strays.

In September 1790 Burns mentioned to Graham that he would gain essential experience and a better income if he were transferred to a Port Division such as Dumfries, Port Glasgow or Greenock. He had a view to being promoted to a Supervisor post somewhere in the North of Scotland.

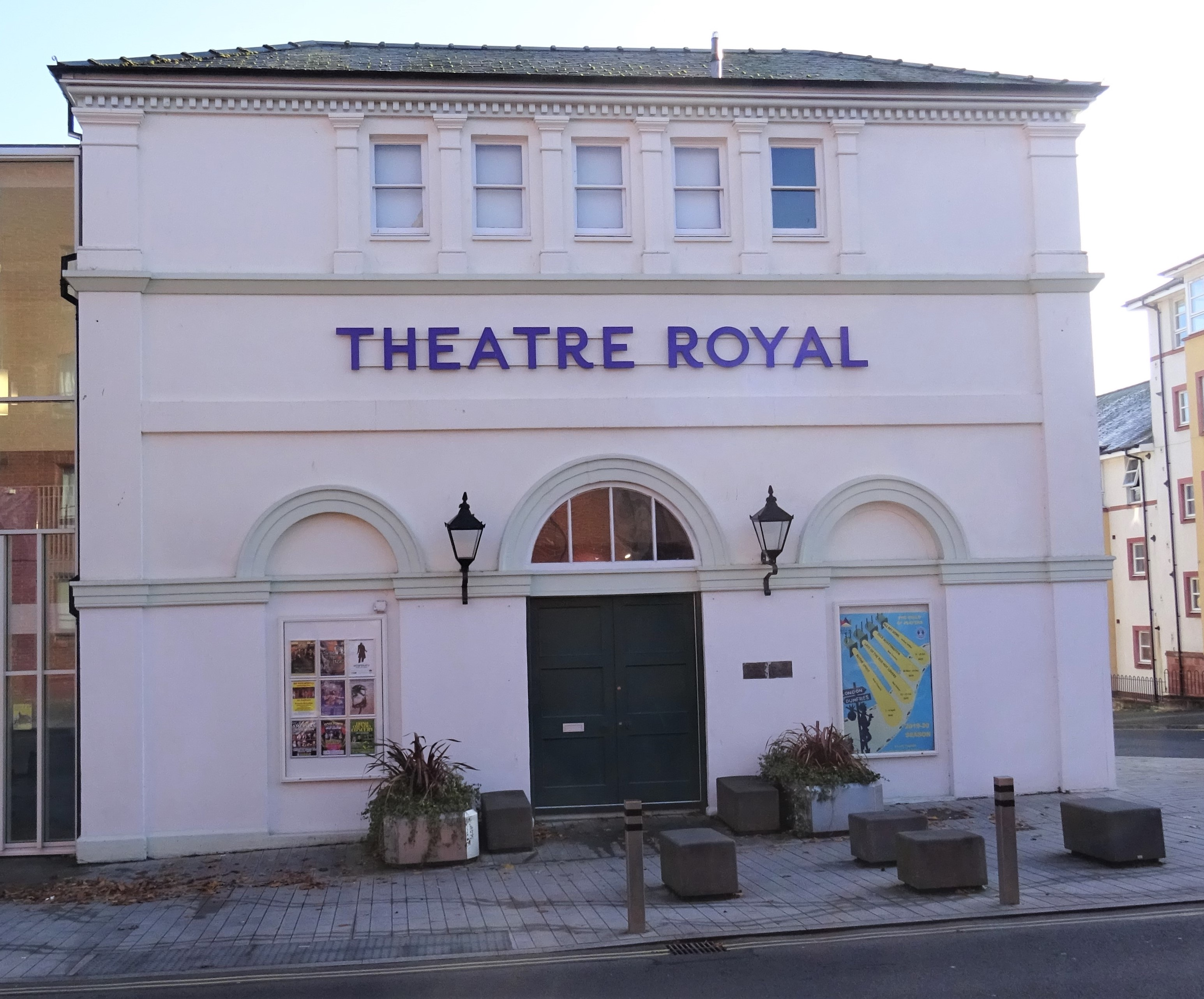
The Theatre Royal frontage, Dumfries.

In December 1792 Burns became embroiled in accusations of disloyalty to the Crown following an incident at Dumfries's Theatre Royal and he wrote to Graham and appealed for help, writing on the last day of that year: "I believe, Sir, I may aver it, and in the sight of Omnipotence, that I would not tell a deliberate Falsehood... and I say, that the allegation, whatever villain has made it, is a LIE! To the British Constitution, on Revolution principles, next after my God, I am mosy devoutly attached". a formal inquiry was set up by the Excise and he only kept his job through his bond of friendship with his more immediate superiors and his professionalism as an officer that saved him.

The first stanza of the 1791 "Epistle to Robert Graham Esq., of Fintry":

"Late crippled of an arm, and now a leg,
About to beg a pass for leave to beg;
Dull, listless, teased, dejected, and deprest,
(Nature is adverse to a cripple's rest);
Will generous Graham list to his Poet's wail?
(It soothes poor Misery, heark'ning to her tale),
And hear him curse the light he first surveyed,
And doubly curse the luckless rhyming trade?"

'Generous Graham' was the recipient of what is effectively a begging letter.

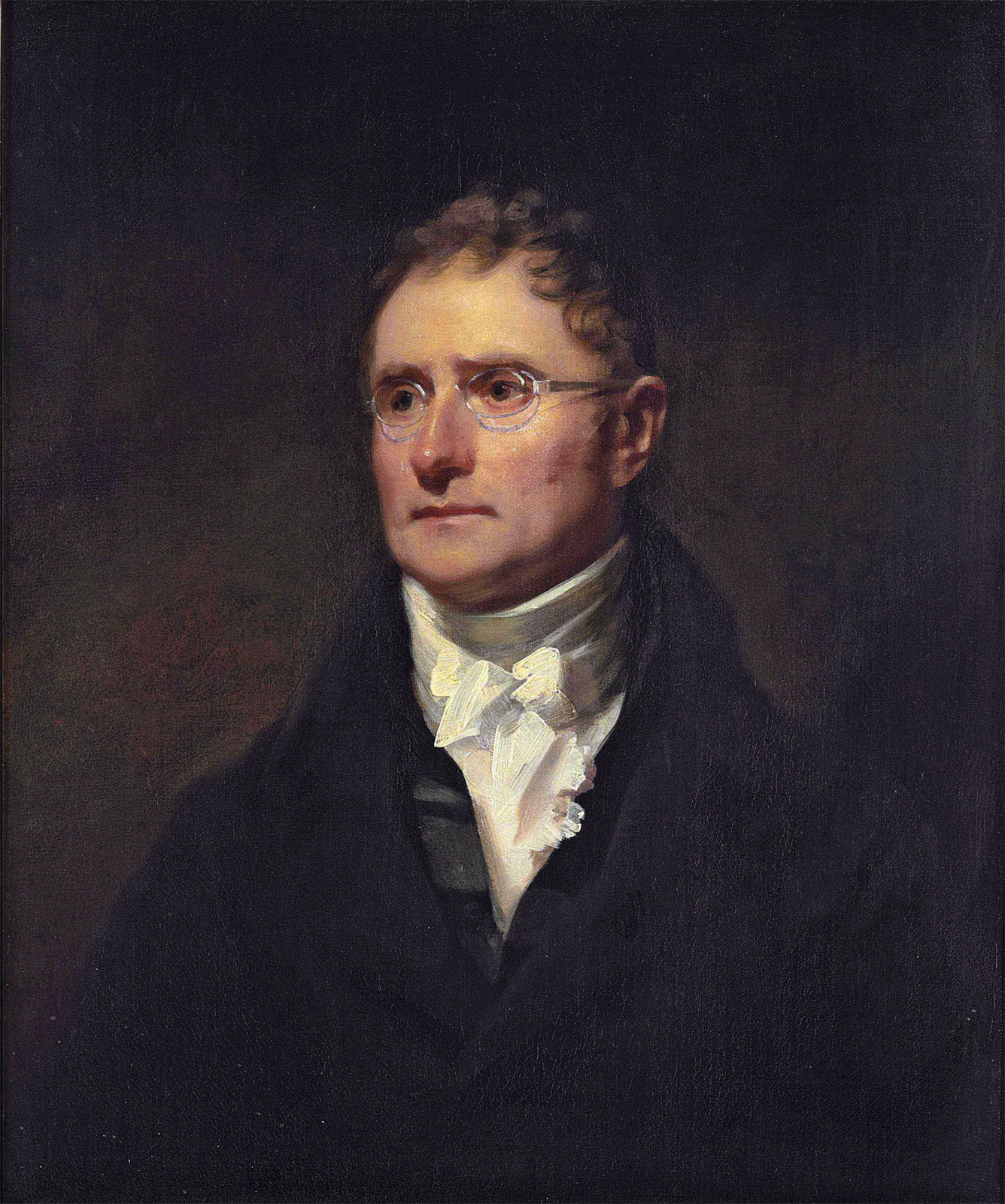
George Thomson by Henry Raeburn

In 1794 Burns wrote the last surviving letter to Graham, again urging promotion, and it finishes: "Should the Chapter of Chances and Changes, which God forbid! ever place a Child of yours in the situation to need a Friend, as I have done; may they likewise find that Generous Friend that I have found in YOU!"

Burns also corresponded with Graham's eldest daughter, Anne, sending her a copy of "Select Collection of Original Scottish Airs" published by George Thomson and inscribed on the blank side of the title page "Here, where the Scottish Muse immortal lives." He also instructed Thomson to send her a copy of his 'Sonatas'. To Elizabeth Graham, Robert's wife, he sent a copy of his "The Rights of Women" and a signed copy of the 1793 Edinburgh Edition of his poems, writing inside that "It is probable, Madam, that this page may be read when the hand that now writes it, is mouldering in the dust."

== See also ==
- Robert Aiken
- Robert Ainsslie
- Jean Armour
- John Ballantine
- Lesley Baillie
- Alison Begbie
- Nelly Blair
- Isabella Burns
- May Cameron
- Mary Campbell (Highland Mary)
- Jenny Clow
- Gavin Hamilton (lawyer)
- Helen Hyslop
- James McKie
- John Syme (lawyer)
