= Alexander Stevenson =

Alexander Stevenson may refer to:

- Alexander Stevenson (cricketer) (1901–1970), Scottish cricketer and sheriff-substitute
- Alexander Stevenson (physician) (1726–1791), Scottish physician
- Alexander Stevenson (rugby union) (1885–1963), Scottish rugby union player
- Alexander Stevenson (Scottish politician) (1860–1936), Scottish councillor and lay preacher
- Alexander Allan Stevenson (1829–1910), Canadian businessman, politician and military officer
- Alexander Campbell Stevenson (1802–1889), American farmer, physician, and politician
- Alexander Stevenson (footballer) (1903–?), Scottish football right back
- Alex Stevenson (1912–1985), Irish footballer

== See also ==
- Alexandra Stevenson (born 1980), American tennis player
