= Bickering Bush =

Scottish thorn near Caprington, linked to legend of Sir William Wallace

Coordinates: 55°35′43″N 4°30′41″W

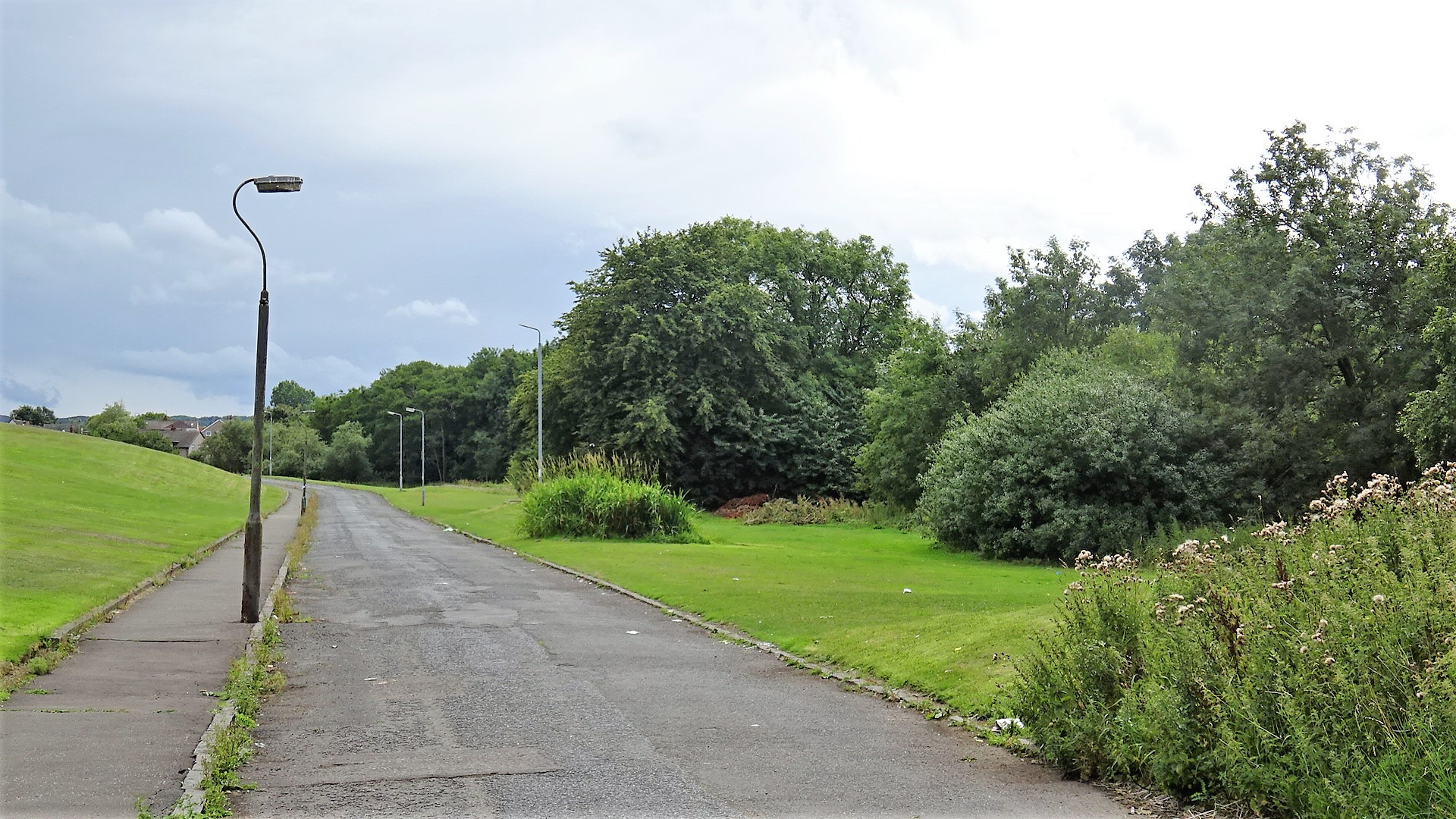
The site of the old Maxholm Farm.

The Bickering bush (NS41863635) thorn grew near Caprington on the lands of Monksholm or Maxholm, Riccarton, East Ayrshire, Scotland. The old farm house at Maxholm sat in hollow on the old Caprington Castle estate and to the north and west its fields bordered the River Irvine. The thorn was located, as recorded on the OS map, near to the confluence of the Kilmarnock Water and the River Irvine, downstream of the Simon's Burn's (aka Maxholm Burn) confluence on the south bank of the river.

Legend has it that in around the year 1292 Sir William Wallace was involved in an incident in which he killed two or three out of five English soldiers who were attempting to take his catch of fish and the 'Bickering Bush' thorn marked the spot.

== History ==
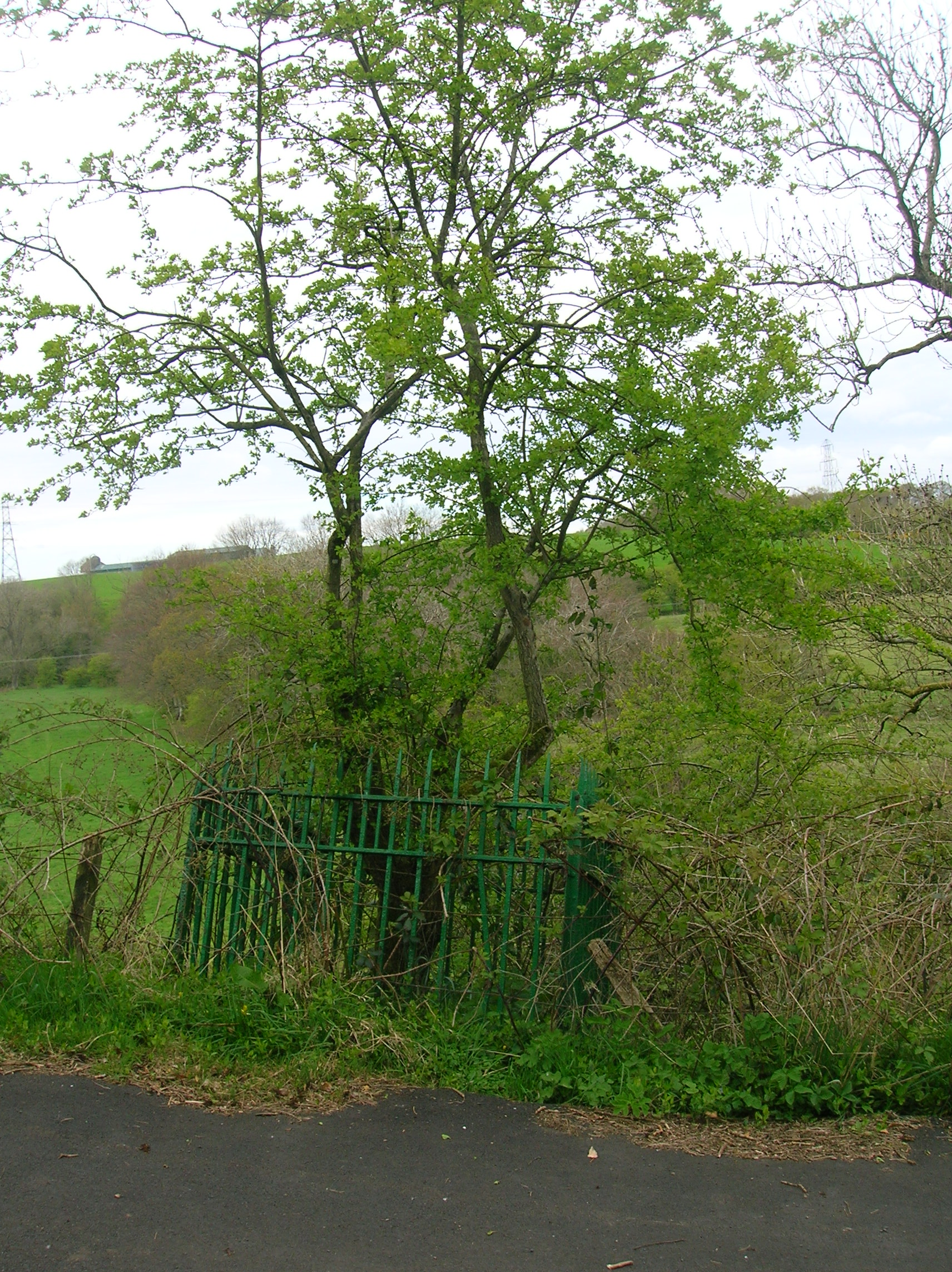
Robert Burns's Trysting Thorn at Millmannoch

Location of the Bickering Bush, East Ayrshire

One version of the story records that: "Wallace one day when fishing in the Irvine Water fell in with a party of English Soldiers 5 in number, who demanded his fish, he offered them part, but less than the whole wold not Satisfy them, unwilling to part with the whole he struck one of them with the butend of his fishing rod, Stunned him, then Snatching his Sword from him, he Soon laid two of the party dead at his feet the remainder retreated leaving Wallace Master of the field and of his fish. " Wallace, after this encounter, is reported to have Said 'I trow that was a bicker'. A bush growing near the Spot was ever after called the Bickering Bush".

Another version is that; "Sir William Wallace was fishing on the River Irvine at the old Monksholm also Maxholm Farm, about half a mile to the west of old Riccarton castle, when a troop of English soldiers dismounted and demanded that he give up his catch. He offered to share, but this was refused and he was grossly insulted by the soldiers for his temerity. He had no weapons, however he used his fishing rod to disarm one soldier and then killed him with his own sword. He similarly dispatched two others and the remaining soldiers then fled."

The tree is referred to as a 'Thorn' which in the Scots language specifically means the hawthorn or mayflower (Crataegus monogyna) rather than the sloe or blackthorn (Prunus spinosa).

The thorn survived until around the late 1820s or early 1830s when it was cut down by a 'Gothic Hand', indicating that it was still living at the time, and the wood was made into souvenirs. A snuff box engraved with its stated origins from the Bickering Bush existed in 1879 as the property of a James Paxton. A single hawthorn has a lifespan of from 150 years to 300 years however they readily set seed and develop as a thicket with trees of different ages developing more or less continuously. Ages of up to 700 years have been claimed such as with the Hethel Old Thorn.

== Riccarton Castle and the Sir William Wallace connection ==
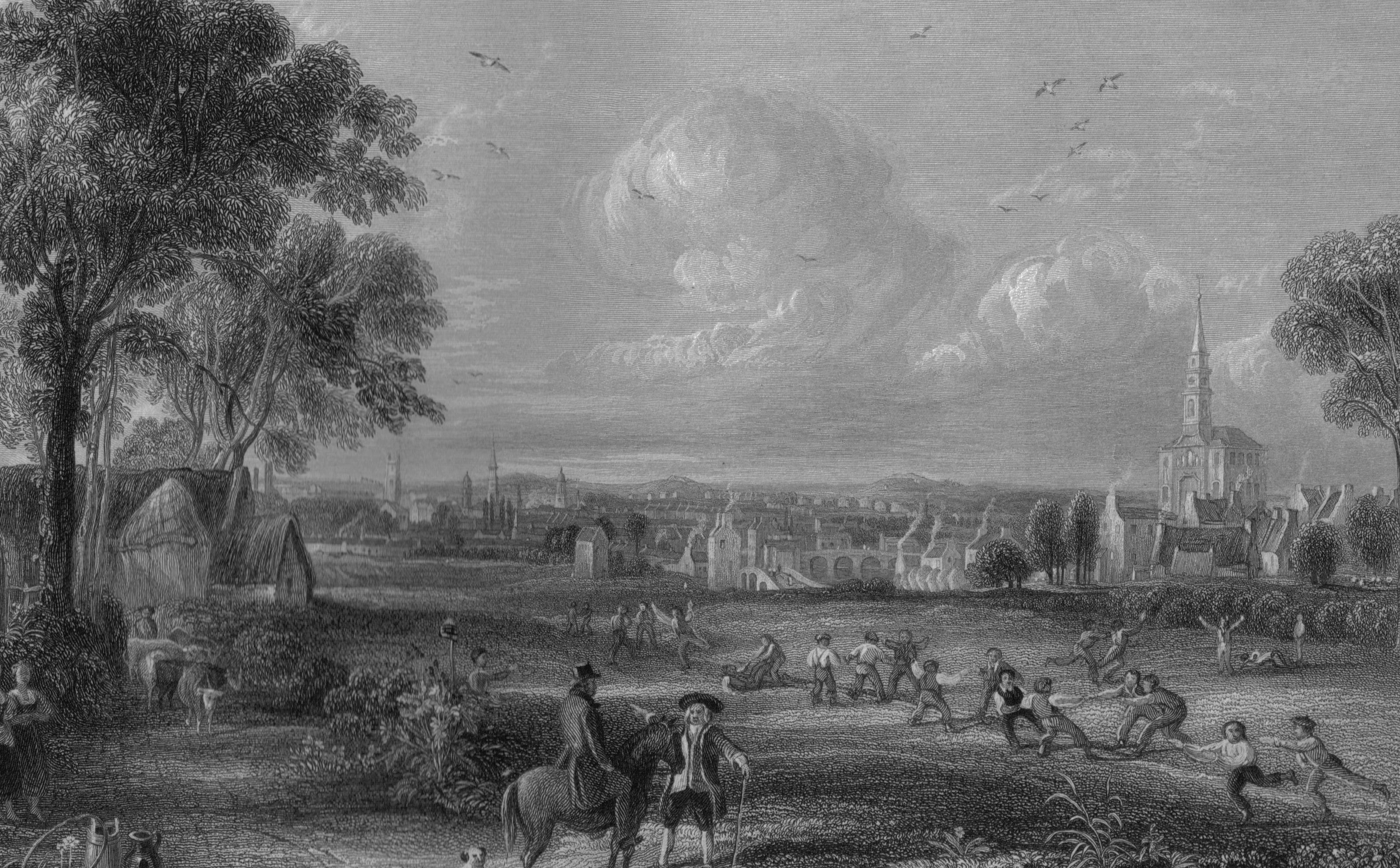
Yardside Farm to the left is said to have been the site of Riccarton castle. The "Seat of Judgement" crowned by Riccarton Parish Church is another possible location. The boys on Riccarton green are playing a game of the Scots and the English.

The Wallace family were the barons or lairds of the Riccarton barony and it is said that Wallace's father Alan was born here. Some go so far as to suggest that William Wallace himself was born in Riccarton parish. After killing Selby, Governor of Dundee, William Wallace took refuge in Riccarton Castle; another time being after he had revenged his uncle's death at the Barns of Ayr.

Blind Harry records the incident in his poem The Actes and Deidis of the Illustre and Vallyeant Campioun Schir William Wallace:

The Wallace

"Three slew he there, two fled with all their might

Unto their horse in a confounded fright;

Left all their fish, no longer durst remain,

And three fat English bucks upon the plain;

Thus in great hurry, having got their cuffs",

They scampered off in haste to save their buffs.

Local tradition states that immediately after the 'Bickering Bush' incident Wallace went to his uncle's castle and was urged by the housekeeper to take on the disguise of a woman working at her spinning-wheel, thereby managing to avoid the English troops who were there shortly after to arrest him.

Following this incident the uprising against King Edward I slowly gained ground, especially after he killed the Sheriff of Lanark in May 1297.

John Wallace of Riccarton married the heiress of Craigie Castle and this became the family's principal residence, old Riccarton Castle being left to fall into ruins to the extent that its true location is now uncertain although a commemorative plaque is located outside the fire station.

In 1875 all that remained of the old castle was some stately trees, including a pear tree at the site of the castle's old orchard, supposedly planted by William Wallace.

=== The site today ===
The location of the old thorn tree is today (datum 2018) a gently undulating field of poorly drained abandoned pasture, separated from the River Irvine on one side by a dual carriageway. Historic Environment Scotland states that "The nature of this legend may indicate a folk-lore memory of archaeological significance".

== The Bickering Bush Public House ==
A painting exists of the 'Bickering Bush Inn' circa 1958 that shows its location next to the old Riccarton and Craigie railway station in Riccarton. The pub moved to a new site in Campbell Street and after closure it was demolished around 1998. The site is now a temporary car park next to the fly over.

== Famous thorns ==
Before the days of the toll roads local distinctive landscape features such as trees, large rocks, etc. were often used as landmarks, such as with the Heart Stone on Rannoch Moor and the Trysting Thorn near Coylton in Ayrshire. Unlike Robert Burns's 'Trysting Thorn' however the 'Bickering Bush' was not replaced with one of its offspring.

The Glastonbury Thorn is probably the most famous 'thorn' and has been replaced with grafted cuttings on several occasions. The Hethel Old Thorn in Norfolk consists of one ancient hawthorn tree, which is claimed to have been planted in the thirteenth century and when measured in 1755 had a girth that was circa 9 feet.

== See also ==
- Robert Burns' Trysting Thorn
- Wallace's Cave, Auchinleck - a site on the River Lugar in East Ayrshire.
- Wallace's Heel Well - a site near Ayr.
- Wallace's Well - Robroyston, Glasgow.
