= Robroyston =

Coordinates: 55.8947°N 4.1812°W

Robroyston: Scottish Gaelic: Baile Raibeart Ruadh
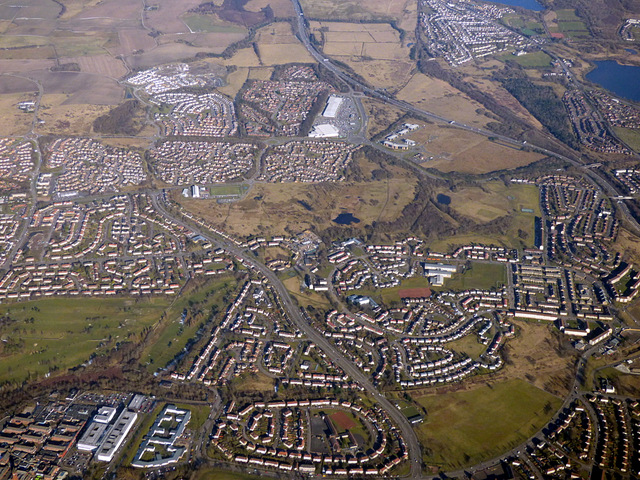
- 2018 aerial view showing Robroyston (top), Balornock (bottom left) and Barmulloch (bottom right) as well as the M80; 'Old Robroyston' is to the far centre-right of the image

- Location within Glasgow
- OS grid reference: NS637690
- Council area: Glasgow City Council
- Lieutenancy area: Glasgow
- Country: Scotland
- Sovereign state: United Kingdom
- Post town: GLASGOW
- Postcode district: G33
- Dialling code: 0141
- Police: Scotland
- Fire: Scottish
- Ambulance: Scottish
- UK Parliament: Glasgow North East
- Scottish Parliament: Glasgow Provan

Robroyston (Scottish Gaelic: Baile Raibeart Ruadh) is a sprawling suburb of Glasgow, Scotland, located around three miles (five kilometres) northeast of the city centre.

To the north, it directly adjoins Auchinairn (part of Bishopbriggs) in the neighbouring East Dunbartonshire local authority area. The Glasgow neighbourhoods of Balornock and Barmulloch lie to the west, but these are largely separated from Robroyston by a nature reserve. Land to the east towards North Lanarkshire is open countryside, which has made the area a popular location for housing developments with the subsequent loss of Glasgow's greenbelt in this area. Land to the south is also unoccupied, but is on the opposite side of the M80 motorway, Junction 2 of which directly serves the area.

== History ==
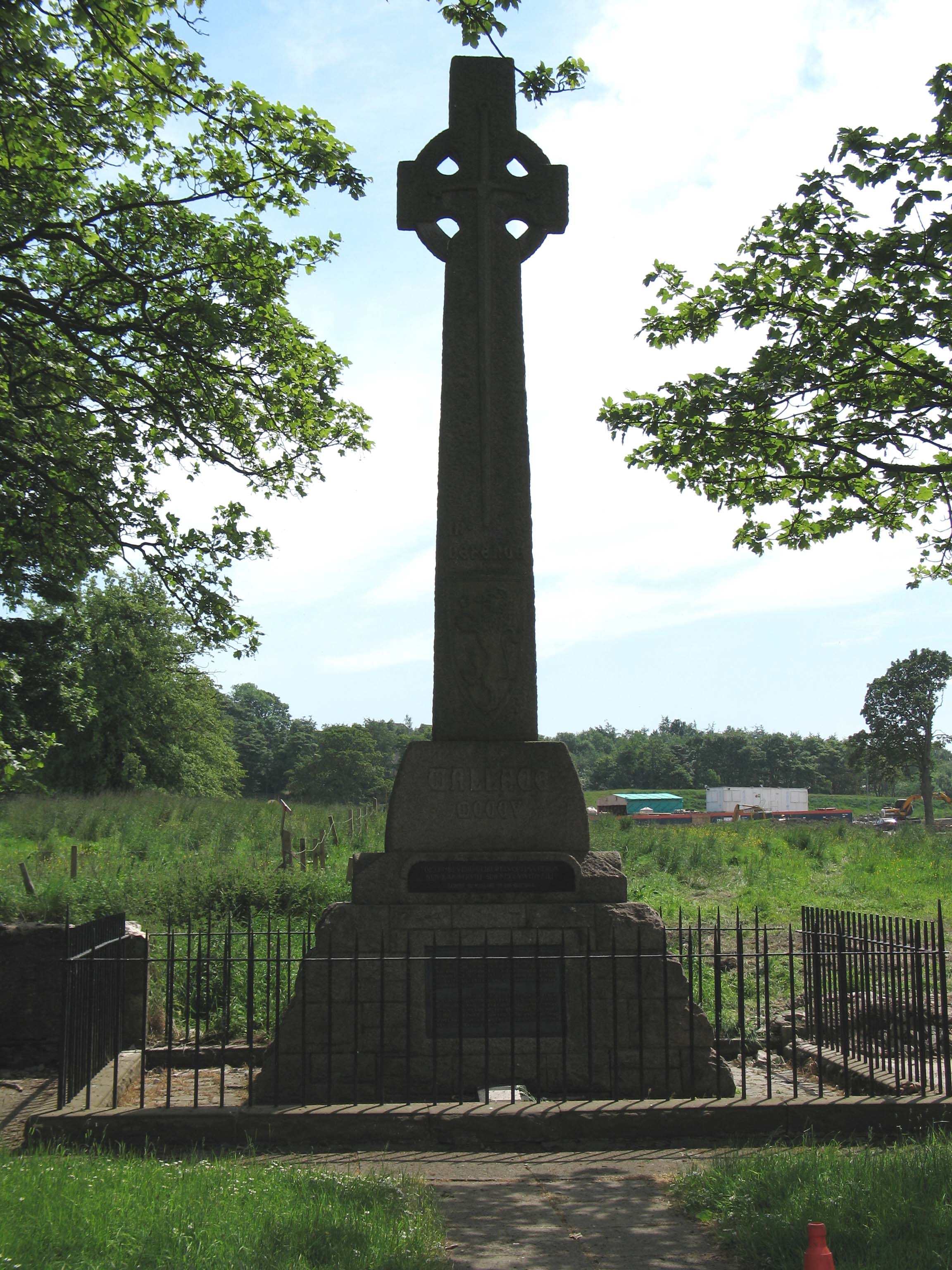
The Site of William Wallace's capture, in Robroyston

=== William Wallace ===
It was in Robroyston that the Scottish leader William Wallace was turned over to English soldiers in 1305. At the site of Wallace's capture there stands a monument — there have also been proposals put forward for a visitor's centre in the area, at the site of the monument. On the monument there is a plaque in Latin, which reads "Dico tibi verum, libertas optimum rerum, nunquam servili sub nexu, vivito fili", which translates to 'I tell you the truth, the best of all things is freedom, never son, live under the bonds of slavery' which was taught to William Wallace in his boyhood.

Auchinairn Instrumental Band at the unveiling of the Wallace Memorial on 4 August 1900

Wallace's Well is located around 500 metres (1,600 ft) from the monument.

=== Hospital ===
Robroyston Hospital was built as a municipal smallpox and tuberculosis hospital and opened in 1918. It was temporarily used as a military hospital in 1918–19. By 1925, 450 beds at Robroyston were devoted to tuberculosis patients, almost half of Glasgow's total complement. In 1945 a maternity unit was added. In 1948, Robroyston joined the National Health Service under the Board of Management for Glasgow Northern Hospitals. In 1974 it was placed in the Northern District of the Greater Glasgow Health Board. It closed in 1977.

=== Housing developments ===
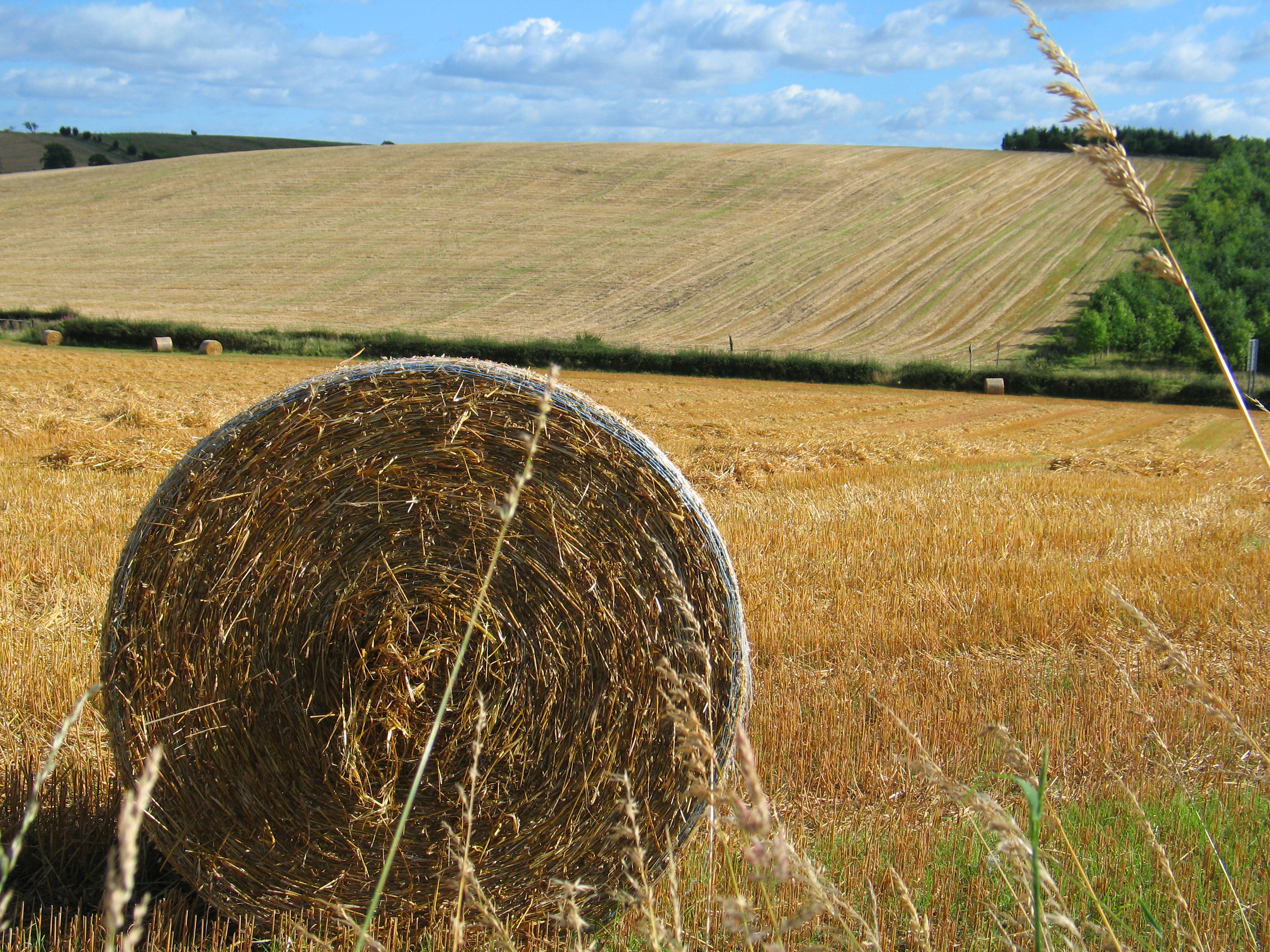
A view of the countryside around Robroyston

A small housing community of mainly miners' rows formed the village of Robroyston c. 1929 to the east of the Barmulloch estates. The row houses were replaced in the 1930s by a development of cottage flats (comprising Zena Street, Earnock Street, Olive Street, Sheila Street, Winifred Street and Hilda Crescent). At that time an open cast mine and a brick works occupied the land to the north of the housing (nowadays this is Robroyston Park) and these homes were occupied mostly by workers. The larger Barmulloch housing estate was constructed during the 1950s and in turn this original Robroyston village became associated with its newer neighbour.

Throughout the 1990s, large-scale housing developments were undertaken to the north east of the original village on the site of Robroyston Hospital and on land that was commonly known as Robroyston Mains in this part of the outskirts of Glasgow. The houses in the initial phase were within four clusters: Brookfield, Briarcroft, Glendale and Louden Hill. This drastically increased the population of the suburb to some 8,300 people. As a result of the boom in population, the area became chronically deficient in infrastructure and provision of many local services, although this problem has been lessened somewhat by the construction of Asda, Lidl and Aldi superstores.

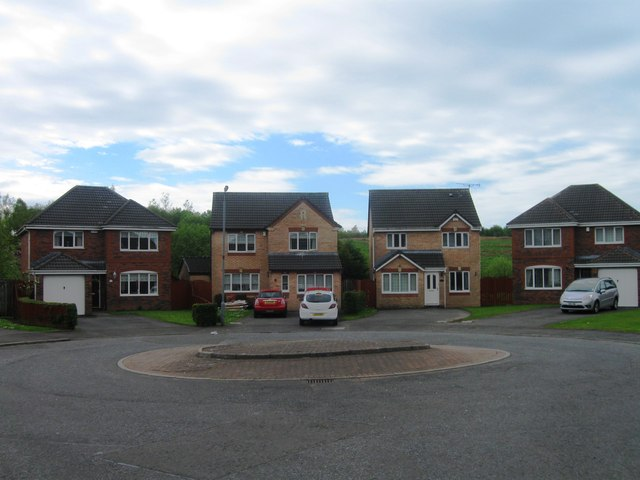
Typical group of small detached houses

Robroyston is underdeveloped in terms of community facilities, but a newly opened primary school (Wallacewell Primary) with community access out of hours is nearby. The Church of Scotland has responded to the growing needs of this new community by establishing Robroyston Church behind Asda at Saughs Drive in the Glendale Estate. Robroyston Church runs both Girls' and Boys' Brigades and employs two youth workers to work with the local teenagers. The church building is also used by a number of other organisations including a parent and toddler group.

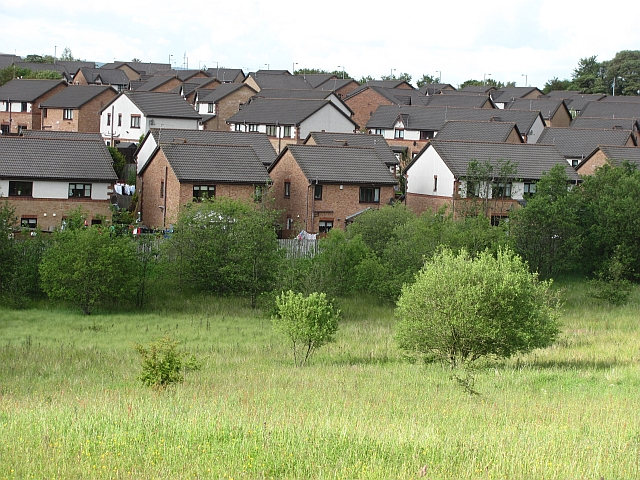
Housing on Auchenbothie Crescent

The development of the Nova Technology Park also looks to boost the local economy and jobs market. Currently, the area is dependent on neighbouring Bishopbriggs, however, a new development which will bring many new homes and leisure and health facilities, as well as a new train station, worth £300 million has been approved by Glasgow City Council, so this should address the lack of facilities in Robroyston.

== Current status ==
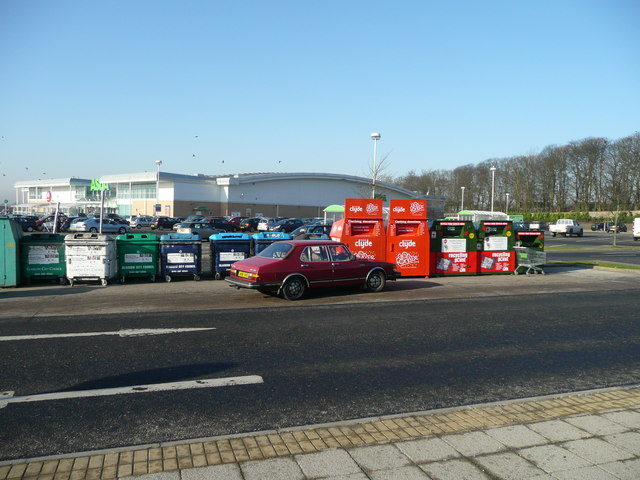
Asda Robroyston store

=== Transport ===
Robroyston's proximity to the M80 motorway permits easy access to Glasgow city centre as well as direct commuter routes to Falkirk, Stirling and Edinburgh. Development is continuing at Robroyston, and demand is expected to be high for new properties at the Stewart Milne Campsie Meadows development (near the site of the local mansion, Robroyston House) Cala Homes Wallacefield and Dickie Homes Robroyston Estate which are situated close to the original modern Robroyston development and near the site of the Wallace Memorial.

Robroyston railway station opened in December 2019.

A pedestrian bridge is planned that will cross the M80 and link the north and south areas of Robroyston.

== Bibliography ==
- Old Glasgow and Its Suburbs in their Celtic Gard: Also Parish of Baldernock – Kirkintilloch to Stirling – Robroyston by Neil Thomson with 80 pages.

== See also ==
- Wallace's Well - Robroyston, Glasgow.
- Wallace's Heel Well - Ayr
- Noddy housing
