= Wallace's Heel Well =

Petrosomatoglyph in South Ayrshire, Scotland

Coordinates: 55°27′25.9″N 4°36′10.3″W

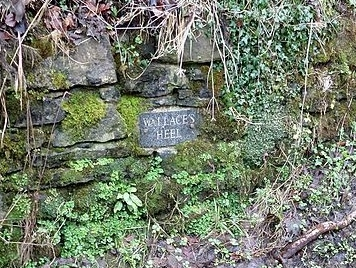
Wallace's Heel Well plaque.

Wallace's Heel Well or Wallace's Heel is located beside the River Ayr (NS35502122) near the old Holmston lime kiln, Ayr, Scotland. It is a petrosomatoglyph said to represent the imprint of a heel and is associated with the story of an escape from English soldiers made by the Scottish hero William Wallace.

== Description ==
The well or spring lies on the river bank below the footpath and has been reached by steps since at least Victorian times as witnessed by postcards from that era. A freshwater spring flows from a 'heel shaped' cavity in the bedrock. A drystone dyke forms the boundary with the footpath and this carries a plaque that reads Wallace's Heel. In 2017 the ladle is no longer present, the well is partly obscured by plant growth and most of the garden flowers are absent. The well is flooded by river water when the river is in spate.

A postcard dated circa 1888 show a brass ladle attached by a chain with the handle pushed into the dyke allowing visitors to take a drink. Postcards of the late 1940s show that the area was planted up with garden flowers. The Holmston lime kiln stands nearby and is known locally as the 'keep' or 'castle'.

Location of Wallace's Heel Well, Ayr, South Ayrshire

== History ==
Following an incident in Riccarton in which an unarmed William Wallace had single handedly killed or injured several English soldiers the Scottish hero and patriot was forced into hiding and he chose Leglen Wood near Auchencruive as the most suitable site of concealment. However, he made several expeditions to Ayr and on one occasion he encountered a group of English troops who were challenging all comers to try their strength against one of their number in return for the payment of one groat (four pence), a significant sum at the time. The challenge was to strike the man's back with a staff and William did so with such great force that he broke the soldier's spine and as a result the remaining soldiers were determined to capture and imprison this Scotsman who had demonstrated his superior strength.

William immediately set off eastwards towards Leglen Wood along a path that lay above the bank of the River Ayr and after a while it became clear that the hounds being used by the English troops were rapidly making ground on him and that his scent trail would be his undoing. William reached Holmston where he jumped down onto the rocks at the edge of the river and in doing so the heel of his boot is said to have left an imprint from which a spring began to flow. His next act was to dive into the river and swim across to the opposite northern bank where his horse had been tethered. William made it safely back to the tree lined gorges of Leglen Wood and Wallace's Heel Well has continued to flow into the Ayr from that day to this.

=== Petrosomatoglyphs ===
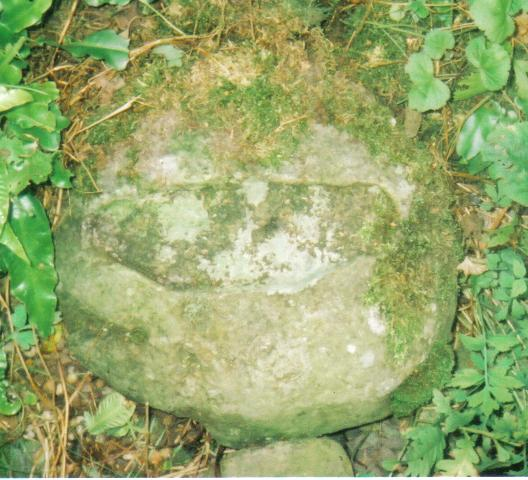
An unclothed footprint on a boulder at Trewithen in Chapeltoun, Ayrshire

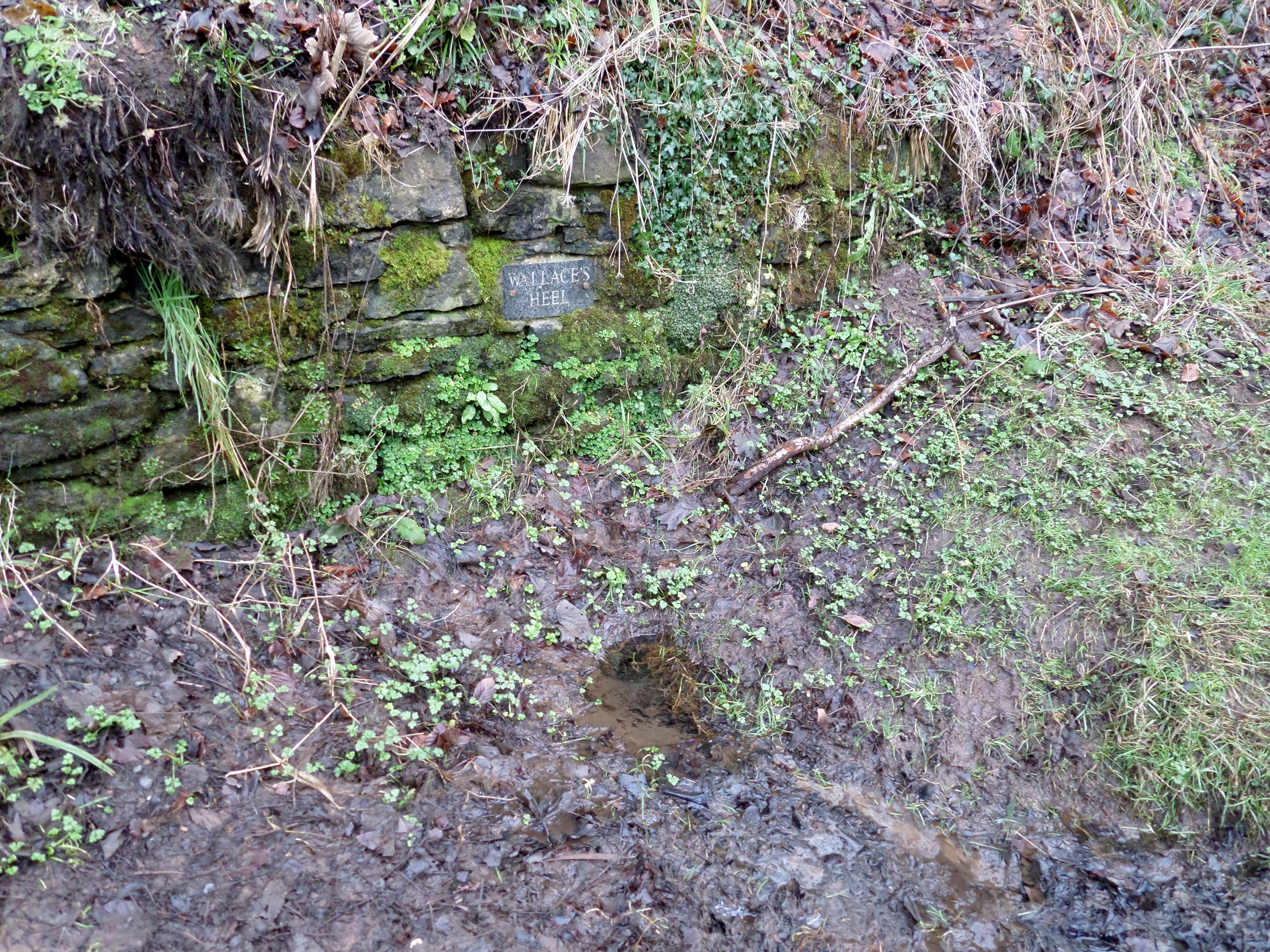
Wallace's Heel and spring.

Wallace's Heel is a good example of a petrosomatoglyph defined as "a supposed image of parts of a human or animal body in rock. They occur all over the world, often functioning as an important form of symbolism, used in religious and secular ceremonies, such as the crowning of kings. Some are regarded as artefacts linked to saints or culture heroes." Another example of a petrosomatoglyph heel prints is to be found at Stonehenge on stone number 14 in the outer circle. Footprints are amongst the most common petrosomatoglyphs however other examples include elbows, knees, the head, hands, horses hooves, dogs feet, etc.

== Micro-history ==
Wallace's Cave was located nearby on the opposite side of the river and it is said that William Wallace also on occasion used it to hide from English troops.

A monument to William Wallace and his great admirer Robert Burns is located in the remnant of Leglen Wood on the west side of the Auchencruive/Belston Road, just south of Oswald's Bridge over the River Ayr. The Cairn was erected by The Burns Federation in September 1929. The site was gifted by Mr. John Hannah of Girvan Mains and the costs covered by the Reverend J. C. Higgins, Minister of Tarbolton Parish.

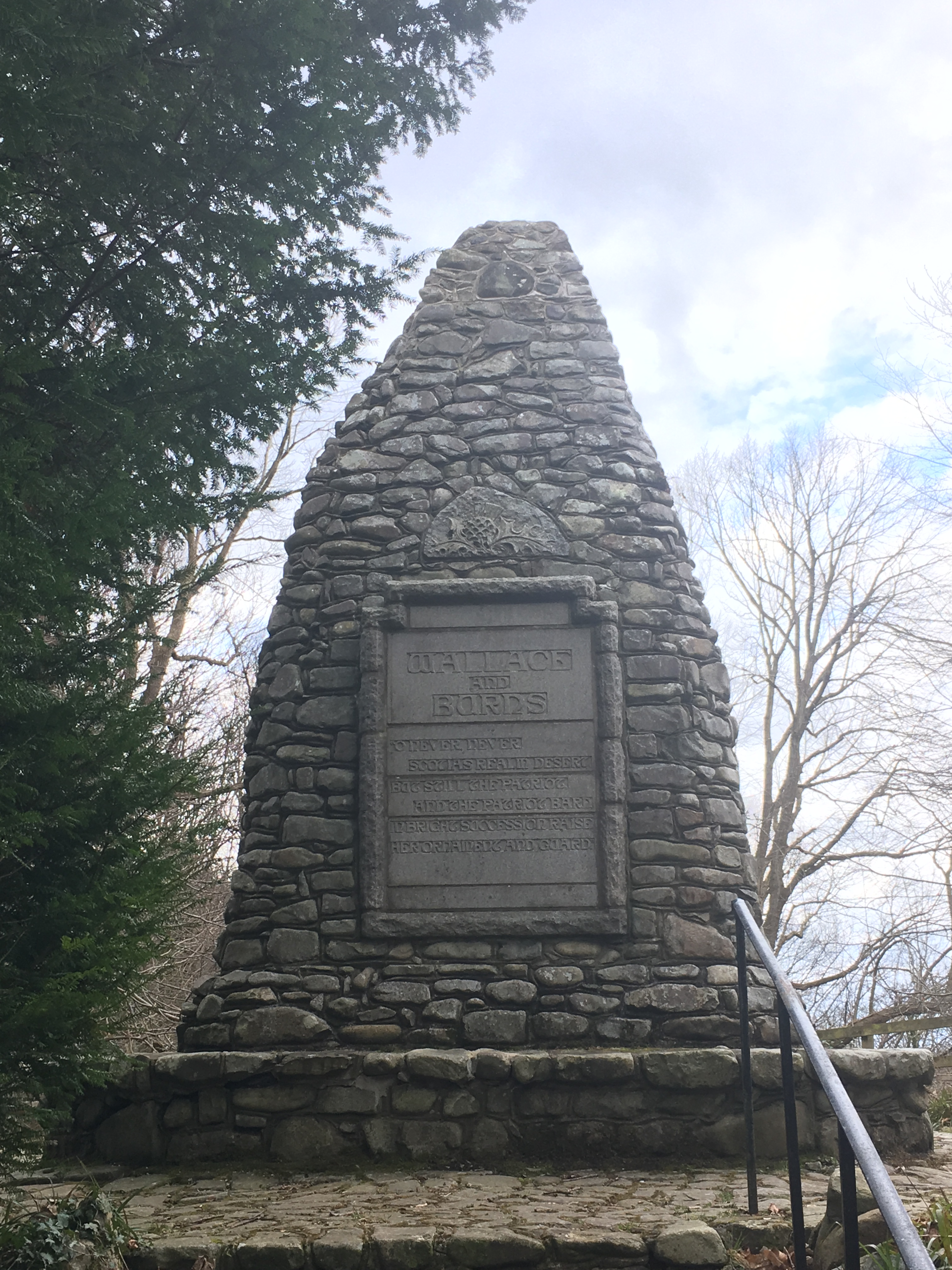
The Wallace Burns Cairn at Auchencruive

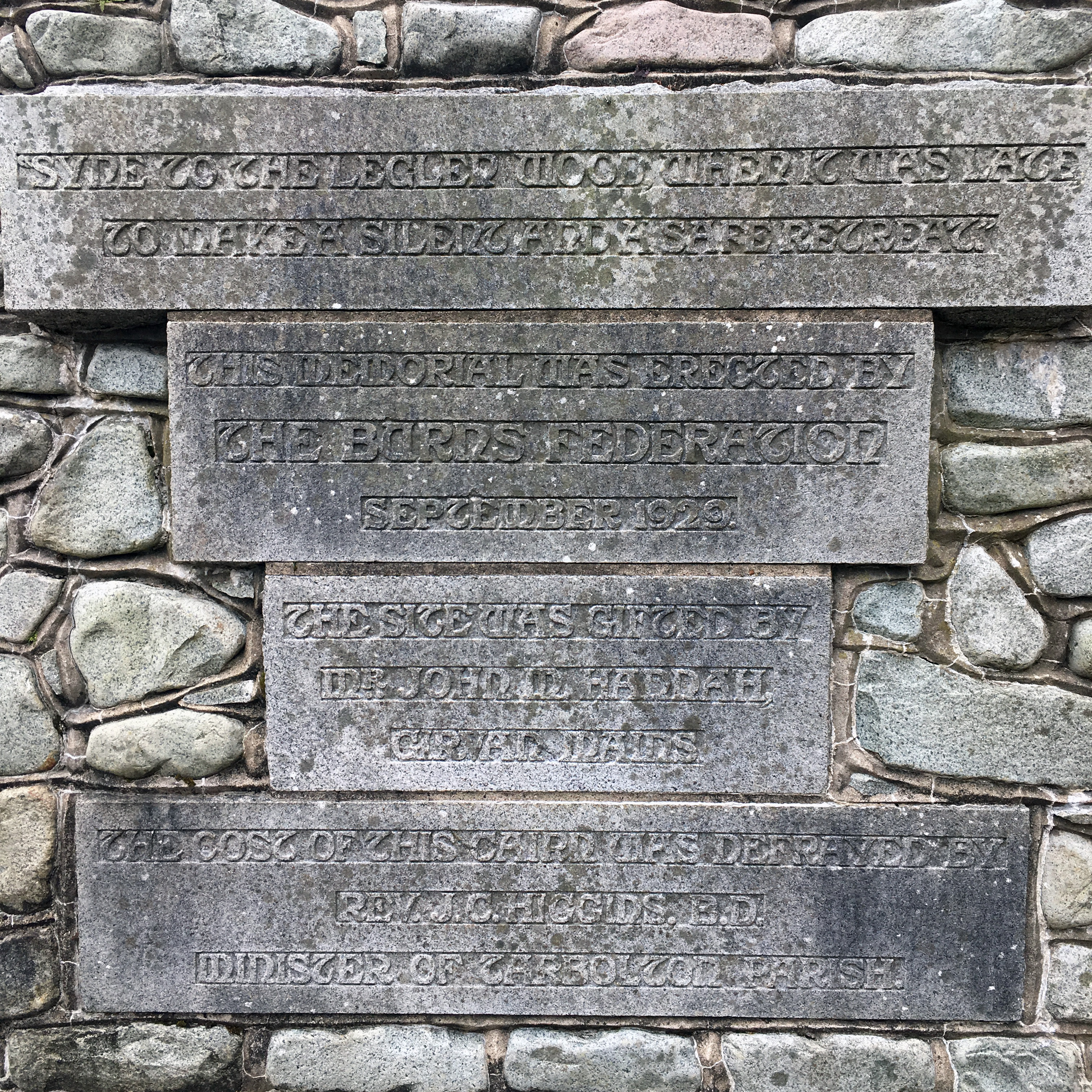
Wallace Burns Cairn - Inscription on the Rear

The inscription on the front of the cairn contains the last lines of Burns's poem "The Cotter's Saturday Night":

WALLACE AND BURNS

O NEVER, NEVER
SCOTIAS REALM DESERT

BUT STILL THE PATRIOT
AND THE PATRIOT BARD

IN BRIGHT SUCCESSION RAISE
HER ORNAMENT AND GUARD

== See also ==
- Bickering Bush
- Riccarton, East Ayrshire – the incident in which an unarmed William Wallace killed English soldiers who were trying to steal the fish that he had caught.
- Wallace's Cave, Auchinleck – a site on the River Lugar in East Ayrshire.
- Wallace's Well – Robroyston, Glasgow.
