= Wallace's Well =

Well in Glasgow, Scotland

Coordinates: 55.900302°N 4.179763°W

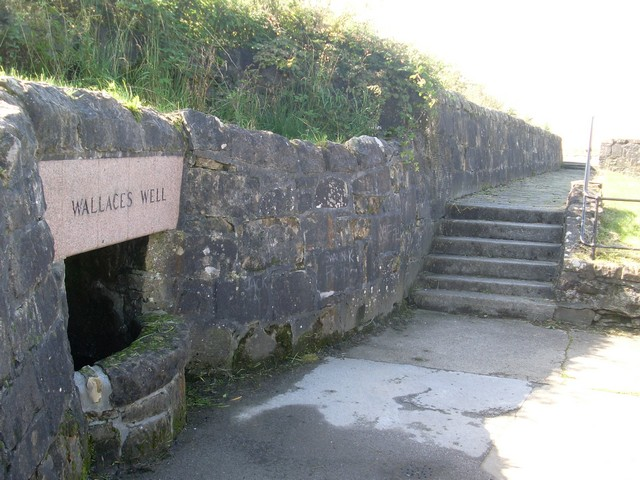
Wallace's Well

Wallace's Well or Auchinleck Well is a historic well which in present times is a monument and tourist attraction, located on Langmuirhead Road near Robroyston (NS 6382 6960) in the Glasgow City council area, Scotland (sited almost exactly on the local authority boundary with North Lanarkshire, and historically in the Parish of Cadder). William Wallace is said to have drunk from the well whenever he visited the area and also just before his capture by English troops commanded by Sir John Mentieth.

== History ==
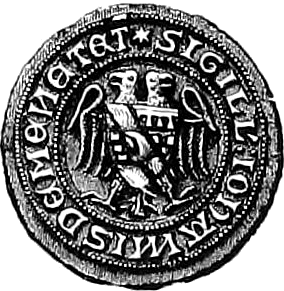
Seal of John de Monteith (c.1297)

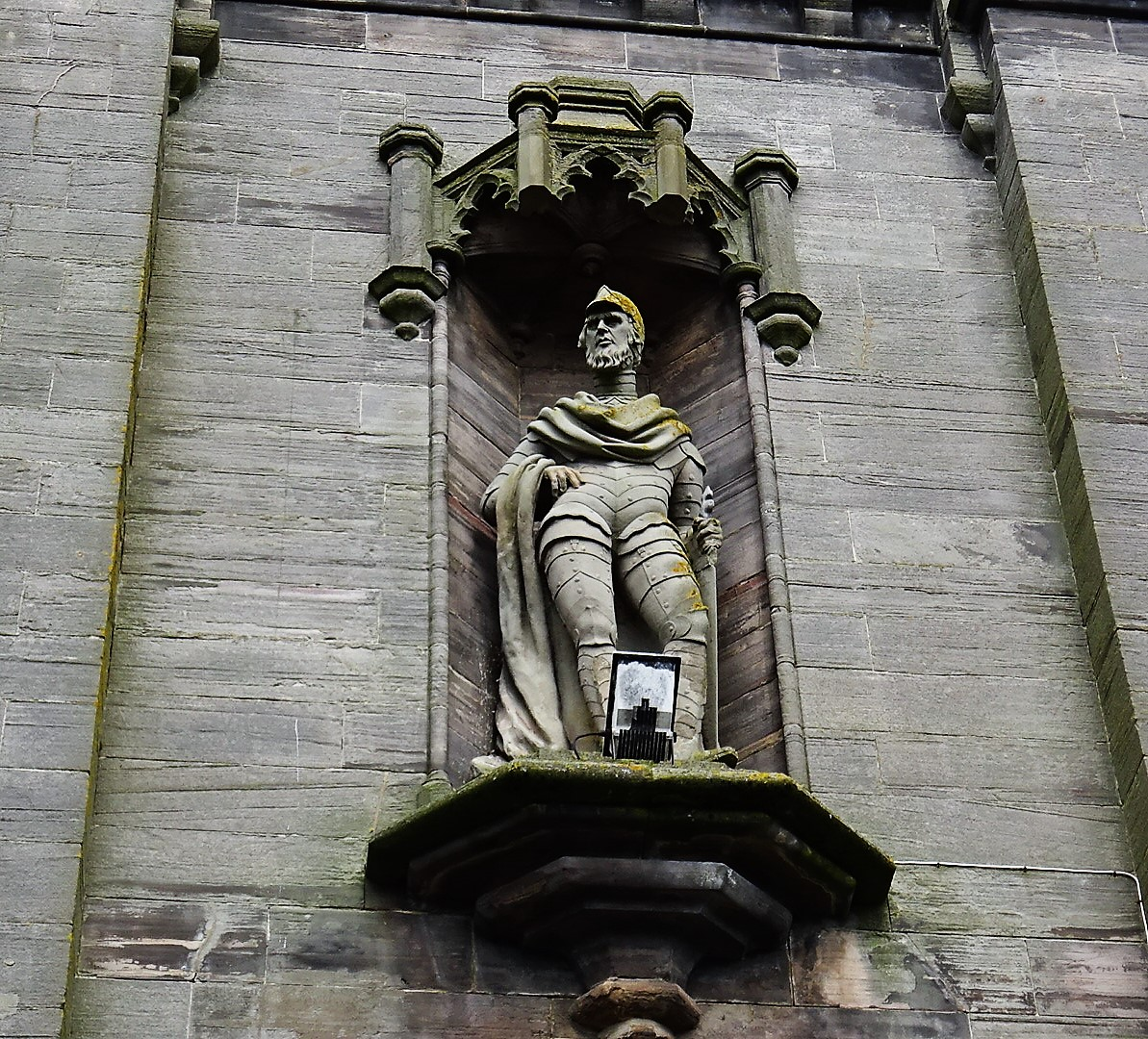
Statue of William Wallace in Ayr.

The Scots bard Blind Harry first mentioned the Wallace Well in his poem, The Actes and Deidis of the Illustre and Vallyeant Campioun Schir William Wallace, better known as The Wallace. The well stands close to the barn where, on the 3rd of August 1305, Wallace was passing through 'Rab or Ralph Rae's Toun', now Robroyston, on a journey to Glasgow, possibly to meet the Bishop of Glasgow, Robert Wishart, in connection with the need for funds to continue the fight for Scottish Independence. The farm's owner, Rab or Ralph Rae, may have been the one who betrayed William Wallace to Sir John Menteith (aka Sir John Stewart of Menteith) who had made an arrangement with Sir Aymer Vallance, the commander of the English troops. After his capture by English troops, he was taken via Dumbarton Castle to London, where he was tried and executed.

Another version by the English chronicler Piers Langtoft records that Sir John captured Wallace through the treacherous information of Jack Short, Wallace's body servant, and that he came in the dead of night and seized him in his bed. Wallace is said to have killed Jack Short's brother and this act of betrayal was his revenge. However, another source states that it may have been Ralph Haliburton, one of his men who had been released from prison and who was later rewarded for spying on Wallace.

Kerlie, a faithful friend and follower, was killed near the well.

Some people think that the well was where that he was taken prisoner. The alternative name 'Auchinleck Well' refers to the farm of Auchinleck rather that the Laird of Auchinleck who was a supporter of William Wallace.

=== Other Wallace's Wells ===
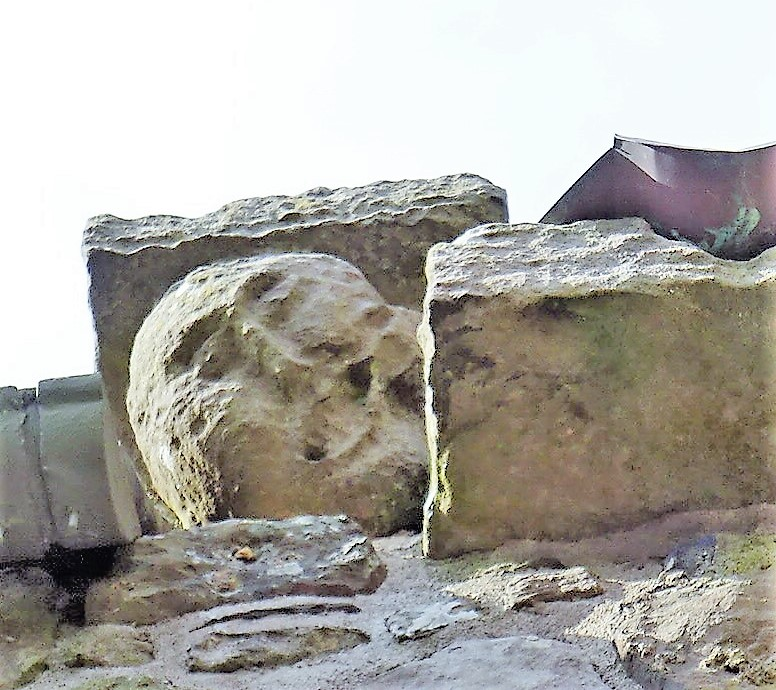
A gargoyle of 'False Menteith' at Dumbarton Castle.

Another Wallace's Well near Elcho Castle in Perth and Kinross got its name from the water from it being Sir William Wallace's favourite drink while he was residing at the castle.

Dunfermline has a Wallace's Well in which he is said to have hidden briefly from English troops after the Battle of Falkirk. In 1303, he visited Dunfermline, accompanied by his mother, with the intention of praying at the shrine of St Margaret.

Ayr has Wallace's Heel Well that derives from an incident that occurred when Wallace was hiding in the Leglen Woods near Auchencruive.

== Description of the well site ==
An old photograph shows the well with a hand-operated cast-iron water pump on the right-hand side of the well opening, indicating that it was a regular and dependable source of water for those living locally, and a gap in the low wall shows that a flow existed at the time. However, now (datum 2018) it is very shallow and partly exposed mud. In 1923, a line drawing shows the well much as it is today (datum 2019); however, the low wall at the entrance was a low metal railing with three vertical supports.

The well has seen many changes over the years, the present appearance originating from around 1911, the previous structure having had a stone with an inscription commemorative of the crucial year 1305. The well is set in a curved alcove in a simply built stone wall by the roadside with the Gadburn flowing in front. A pink granite lintel over the well now reads 'Wallace's Well'.

The well was listed in 1970. However, the listing was removed in 2001, as the association with William Wallace is held by some to be of quite recent origin. The well site came under threat from a housing development of more than 800 houses.

Restoration of the site was undertaken in June 2011 with re-turfing of the Wallace Well area.

Location of the Wallace or Auchinleck Well, Robroyston

== Wallace's Cross ==
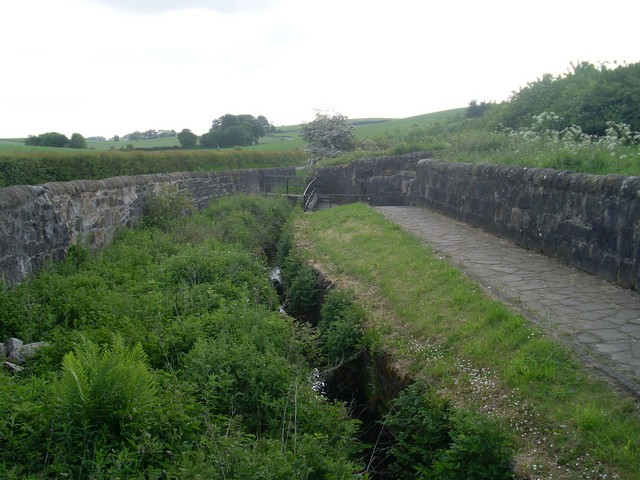
Wallace's Well and the Gadburn

The building where the capture of William Wallace, previously the Guardian of Scotland, traditionally took place was demolished in the 19th century and a cross erected on the site (NS 63415 69338) on August 4, 1900. This barn or cottage at Robroyston reportedly survived until around 1826 and the buildings foundations could be seen for a time after, located to the east of the present day monument. Roof timbers from the building were however rescued and made into a chair by Sir Walter Scott and can be seen at Abbotsford House.

The tall pink granite cross was carved by McGlashen, sculptors, Edinburgh and has the same form as St Martin's cross, Iona. The monument is elevated high up on a granite plinth and surrounded by plain iron railings. It was unveiled by Miss Emmeline McKerlie, a direct descendant of Kerlie, Wallace's faithful companion. Cadder Parish Council were the guardians of the monument and around a thousand people were present at the opening. John B. Calder, of Muirhead was responsible for the ancillary work including laying the foundations, erecting the railings, and building the boundary wall with its little stone ball ornamentation. The wall around the Memorial Cross was rebuilt and a commemorative plaque was also added by Convener, David R. Ross. A bench has been placed at the site that is a double seater version of one said to have belonged to Wallace and now (datum 2018) at Balnagowan Castle, Ross-shire.

== See also ==
- Bickering Bush
- Wallace's Heel Well
