= Riccarton, East Ayrshire =

Coordinates: 55.583°N 4.484°W

Riccarton: Scottish Gaelic: Baile Riocair; Scots: Riccartoun
- Location within East Ayrshire
- OS grid reference: NS434349
- Council area: East Ayrshire
- Lieutenancy area: Ayrshire and Arran
- Country: Scotland
- Sovereign state: United Kingdom
- Post town: KILMARNOCK
- Postcode district: KA
- Police: Scotland
- Fire: Scottish
- Ambulance: Scottish
- UK Parliament: Kilmarnock and Loudoun
- Scottish Parliament: Kilmarnock and Irvine Valley
- Website: http://www.east-ayrshire.gov.uk/

Riccarton is a village and parish in East Ayrshire, Scotland. It lies across the River Irvine from Kilmarnock, this river forming the boundary between Riccarton and Kilmarnock parishes, and also between the historical districts of Kyle and Cunningham. The name is a corruption of 'Richard's town', traditionally said to refer to Richard Wallace, the uncle of Sir William Wallace. The parish also contains the village of Hurlford.

== History ==
The village became a Burgh of Barony in 1638, but its civic powers were never exercised. Riccarton is also sometimes called Ellerslie. In 1875 Riccarton had a population of 1,889, but by 1951 that had increased to between 7,000 and 8,000; many of whom were employed at the Glenfield Works in Kilmarnock.

Riccarton has effectively been absorbed into Kilmarnock, partly through the growth of council housing estates at Shortlees, Witchknowe and Burnpark, and later by the improvements to the A71 (T) road, the building of which, together with associated interchanges, effectively made the old village centre into a large traffic island.

=== The Barony of Riccarton ===
The ancient 109 merkland barony included 54 separate landholdings, including the coalheughs of Riccarton and all the buildings, orchards, woods, mills, and fishings (salmon and others). Riccarton and Shaws mill were included. Also the £17 lands of Kaimshill, Auchindinane and Hunthall, oddly also the £5 land of Elderslie in Renfrewshire, the 4 merklands of Inchgotrig and the 2 merklands of Holme.

=== The churches ===
A pre-reformation Riccarton parish church stood in the centre of the old burial ground; first noted, as a chapel, in 1229, sub-ordinate to the church of Dundonald. It was granted by Walter, High Steward of Scotland, to the short-lived independent Gilbertine convent of Dalmulin. This convent was dissolved in 1238, and the 'chapel' given to the monastery of Paisley, becoming the parish church, which still belonged to the monks. The last patrons were the Cuninghames of Caprington, whose impressive memorial still stands; some of the Campbells of Treesbank are also interred here.

The old cemetery in 2007

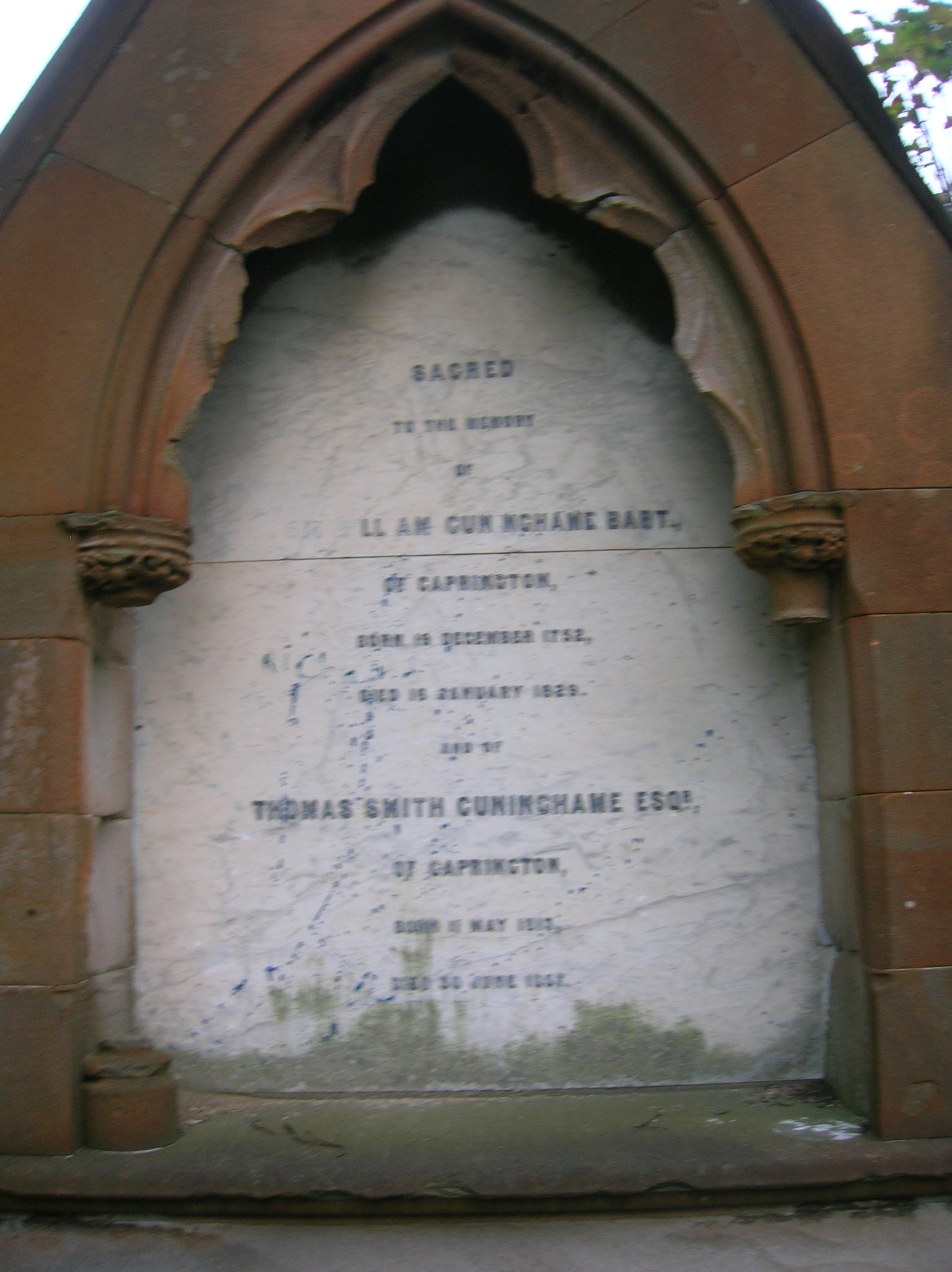
Detail of memorial to Caprington Cuninghames.

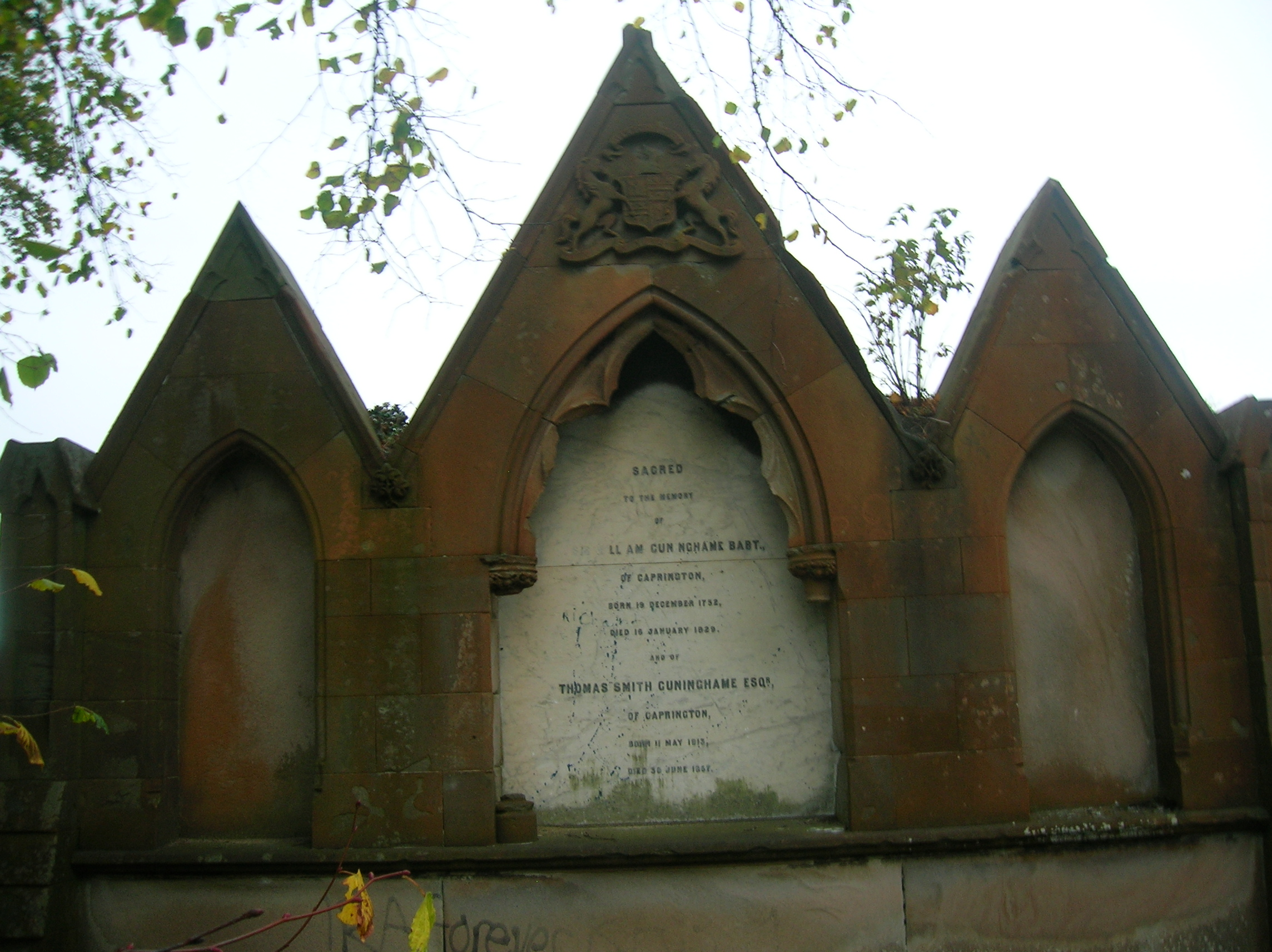
A memorial to Caprington Cuninghames.

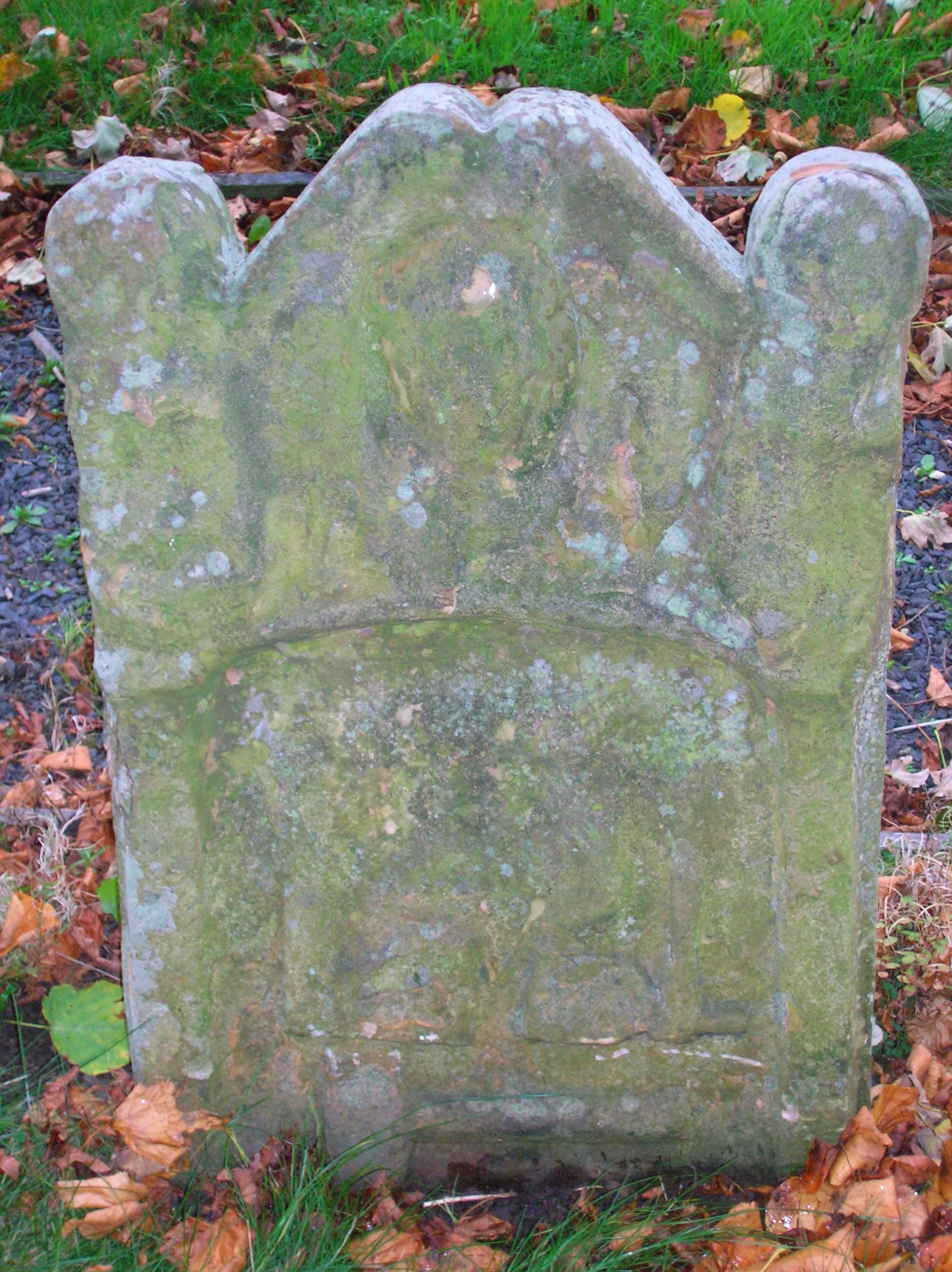
A memorial bearing a bodkin, shears and an iron.

The old cemetery has a number of interesting pre-reformation style gravestones, ornamented with scenes of men ploughing with oxen, one with a bodkin, shears and iron, another with millstones, wheels, and other gearing, and even a few with Garden of Eden scenes. The oldest discernible stone is marked 1641. Unfortunately many are very worn and heraldic devices, etc. can no longer be made out with any certainty.

From the presbytery records it would appear to have been rebuilt in 1725. It was replaced by the present church (at NS 4282 3639) in 1823, which was built on the old Judgement or Moot hill of the barony of Riccarton. Of the old church in the small churchyard nearby, nothing now remains above ground, the stones being used to build a single story house close to the old bridge.

The manse no longer exists, however it had a claim to significance in that it had a mantelpiece in its kitchen which came from the dining room of Riccarton castle.

==== Sawney Moodie ====
Alexander Moodie (1728–1799) was the Auld-Licht Protestant minister of Riccarton lampooned by Robert Burns. Burns has him preaching with hell-fire roaring, enough to send the Devil himself back to his hot hell in fright. He was educated at Glasgow University and starting his ministry at Culross in 1759. He was buried in the Riccarton churchyard, but the present church wasn't built until 1823.

Alexander had a hyperactive and deafening preaching style. Burns also references him in the Holy Fair with :

His lengthen'd chin, his turned-up snout,
His eldritch squeel an' gestures,
O how they fire the heart devout..

This was followed by a lampooning in "The Kirk's Alarm" where his swarthy complexion earned him the title of Singet Sawnie. Burns wrote The Holy Tulzie in 1784 in response to a verbally violent dispute over parish boundaries between Alexander Moodie and the John Russel, minister of Kilmarnock's High Kirk.

=== Local worthies and eccentrics ===
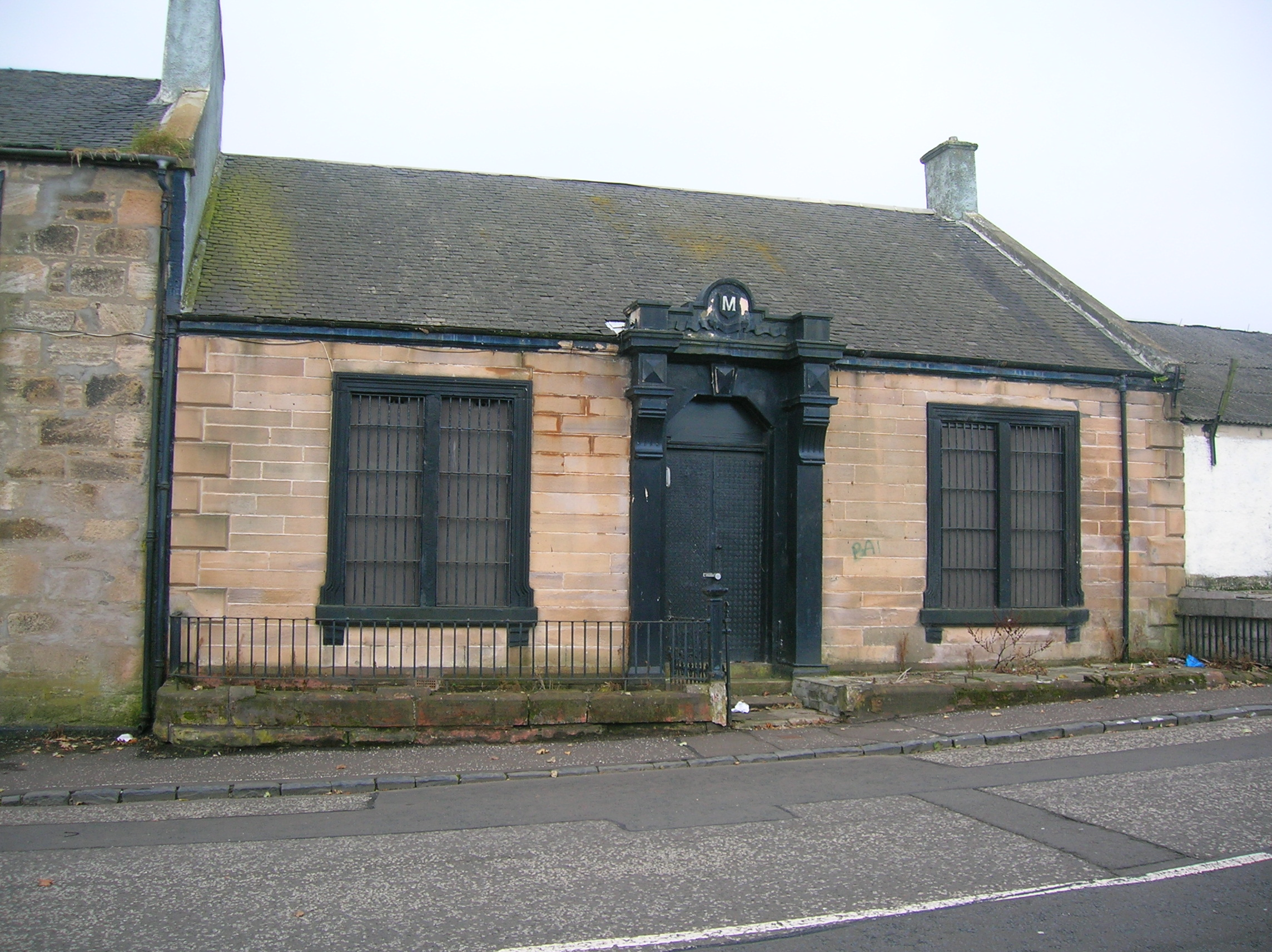
The house built at the old bridge from the ruins of old Riccarton Kirk.

Gilbert de Grimsby was born at Riccarton and would have known William Wallace during his childhood. Gilbert's Scots nickname was 'Jop' and as a man of great stature and generally impressive appearance he was chosen by Edward I to carry the sacred banner of Saint John of Beverley at the head of the English army at the Battle of Dunbar in 1296 after voluntarily joining the English army. He had served under Edward in Flanders and Picardy and had been selected as a pursuivant or herald. On hearing of William Wallace's insurrection Gilbert deserted Edward and joined William's rebellion, bringing invaluable intelligence about the English army and being rewarded with the position of standard-bearer.

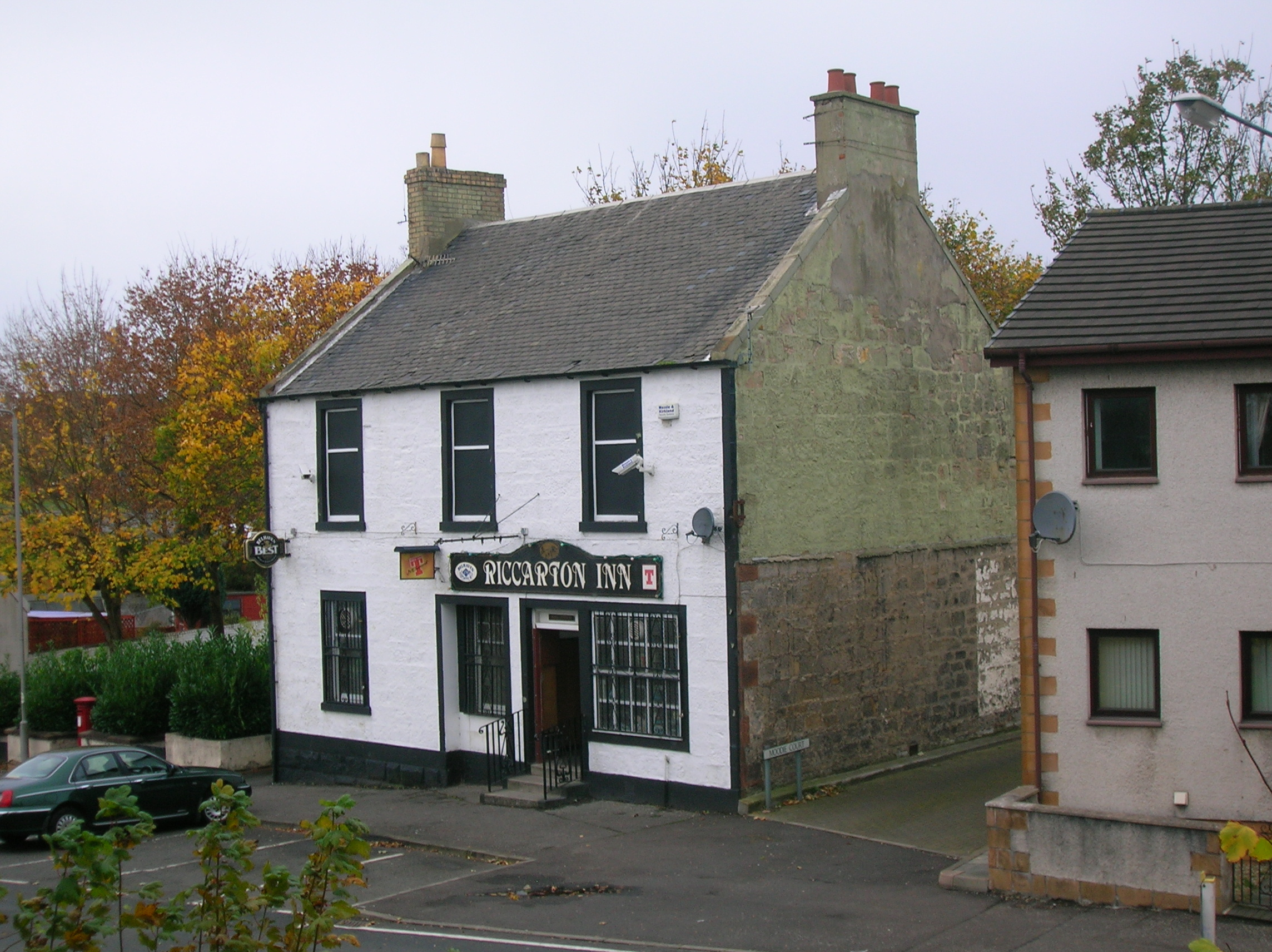
Riccarton Inn from the old cemetery.

Parts of Riccartoun with Kilmarnock in 1880.

The Rev. Alexander Moodie, minister of the parish, is buried in the old cemetery. Robbie Burns mentions him in The Holy Fair.

Sandy McCrone was a blind fiddler who is remembered for having climbed to the top of the new church when the scaffolding was still in place and placed a potato on the beak of the weathercock.

William Stevenson was a local beggar who came from Dunlop. About 1787 he separated from his wife and made the unusual pledge that if either of them were to make an attempt at reconciliation then that person was to pay the other a £100; a considerable sum in those times. When he died it was found that he was worth around nine hundred pounds. He set aside money for all the beggars in Ayrshire to come and see his body lying in state and then enjoy a great feast in his honour.

Sir James Shaw, Bart., a Lord Mayor of London was born at Mosshead farm on the Treesbank estate in 1764. His statue now stands outside the Dick Institute in Kilmarnock. Sir James endeared himself to Scotland by the active part which he took in raising money in London for the widow and children of Robbie Burns.

=== The Seat of Judgement ===
The present 1823 parish church of Riccarton stands on a mound which is partly natural and partly artificial and which was formerly called "Seat of Judgement", having been a court or moot hill where justice was administered by the old baron court of Riccarton. Paterson in 1863 called it the "Moat." Soil from the foundations of the new church on the old moot hill was used to fill up part of the river bed when its course was changed at East Shaw Street, and this area though north of the Irvine still lies in Riccarton parish. Witchknowe is an area of Riccarton named after a low hill. No definite site for the 'Gallow's hill' associated with the Moot hill has been identified and this is a candidate, together with the 'Castle hill.'

The 'Castle Hill' in 1895 was a round-topped mound with an oval base close to Damhead House. It was 26 paces in its longest diameter at the base, 15 feet (4.6 m) high on one side and 4-foot-6-inch (1.37 m) on the other. It was covered with trees and had a seat and a path to the top.

=== Riccarton Castle and the Sir William Wallace connection ===
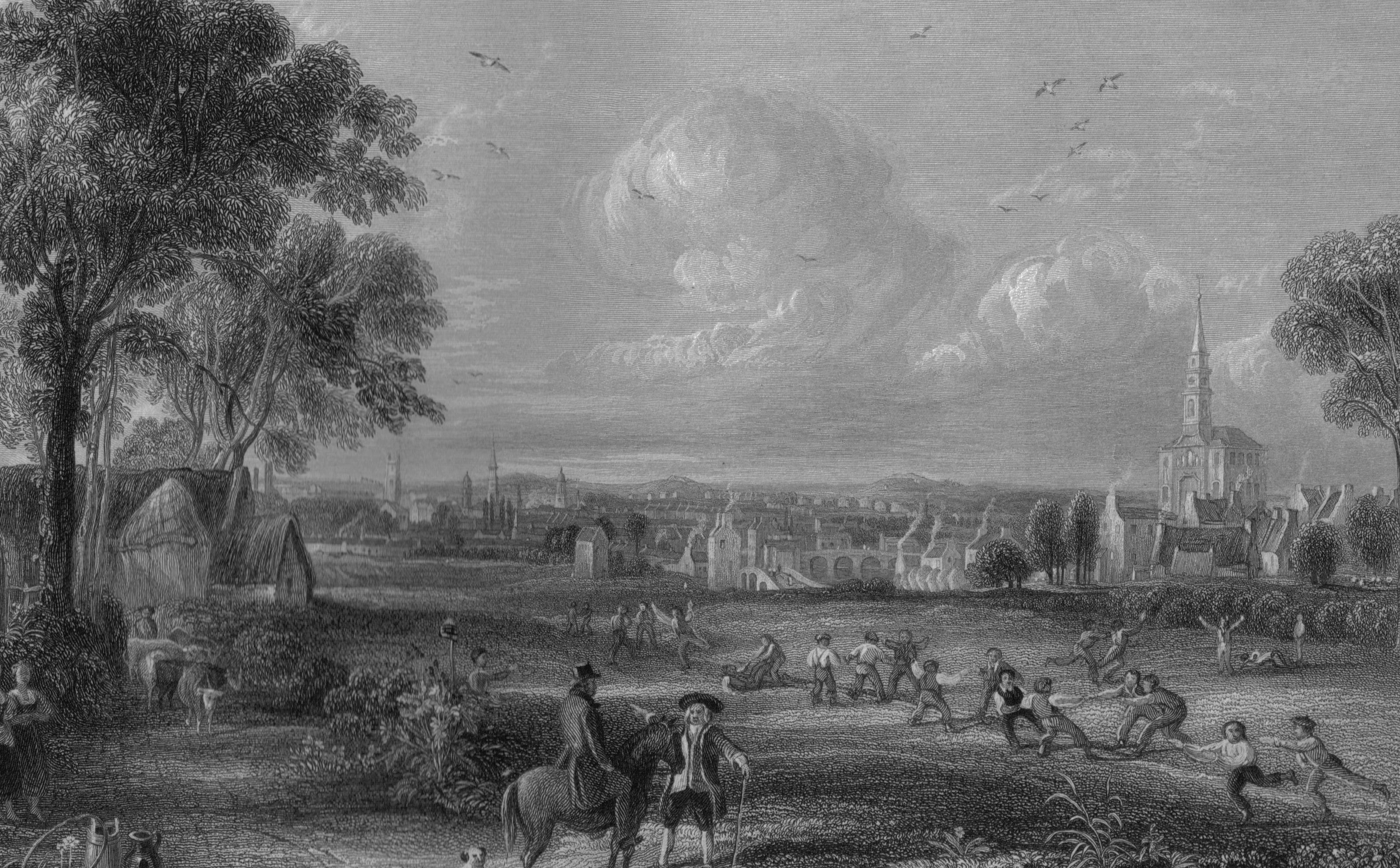
Yardside farm to the left was the site of Riccarton castle. The boys on Riccarton green are playing a game of the Scots and the English.

The name Wallace was spelled in various ways, such as 'Waleys', 'Walensis', 'Walays', etc. The family were the barons of Riccarton and it is said that Wallace's father was born here. Some go so far as to suggest that William Wallace himself was born in Riccarton. After his murder of Selby, Governor of Dundee, William Wallace first sought refuge in Riccarton castle; another time being after he had revenged his uncle's death at the Barns of Ayr.

A little below the watermeetings of the Irvine and the Kilmarnock Water took place a pivotal incident in 1297 which led to the Scottish Nation regaining its independence following what was effectively its conquest by Edward I of England.

Sir William Wallace was fishing on the Irvine at Monksholm also Maxholm farm, about half a mile to the west of old Riccarton castle, when a troop of English soldiers dismounted and demanded that he give up his catch. He offered to share, but this was refused and he was grossly insulted by the soldiers for his temerity. He had no weapons, however he used his fishing rod to disarm one soldier and then killed him with his own sword. He similarly dispatched two others and the remaining soldiers then fled. The Bickering Bush commemorated the site of the incident until the 19th century.

He went to his uncle's castle, the nearby Riccarton castle and took on the disguise of a woman working at her spinning-wheel, thereby eluding the vengeful English troops. In the following months an uprising slowly gained impetus through the example of one unarmed Scotsman killing three armed soldiers. A thorn tree called the "Bickering Bush" stood nearby and its site is marked on the 1860 OS map and a public house by that name used to stand in Riccarton, although another still exists in Bonnyton, Kilmarnock.

John Wallace of Riccarton married the heiress of Craigie Castle and this became the principal residence, the old castle being allowed to fall into ruins. In 1875 all that remained of the castle was some stately trees, including a pear tree supposedly planted by William Wallace.

=== Death at Riccarton's Nether ford ===
At the Nether Ford on the Irvine near Riccarton, Robert the Bruce in 1307 sent Sir James Douglas to intercept the English soldiers commanded by Sir Philip de Mowbray. The English were ambushed as they crossed the ford on the Irvine and sixty lay dead before the survivors fled.

Views of Riccarton kirk

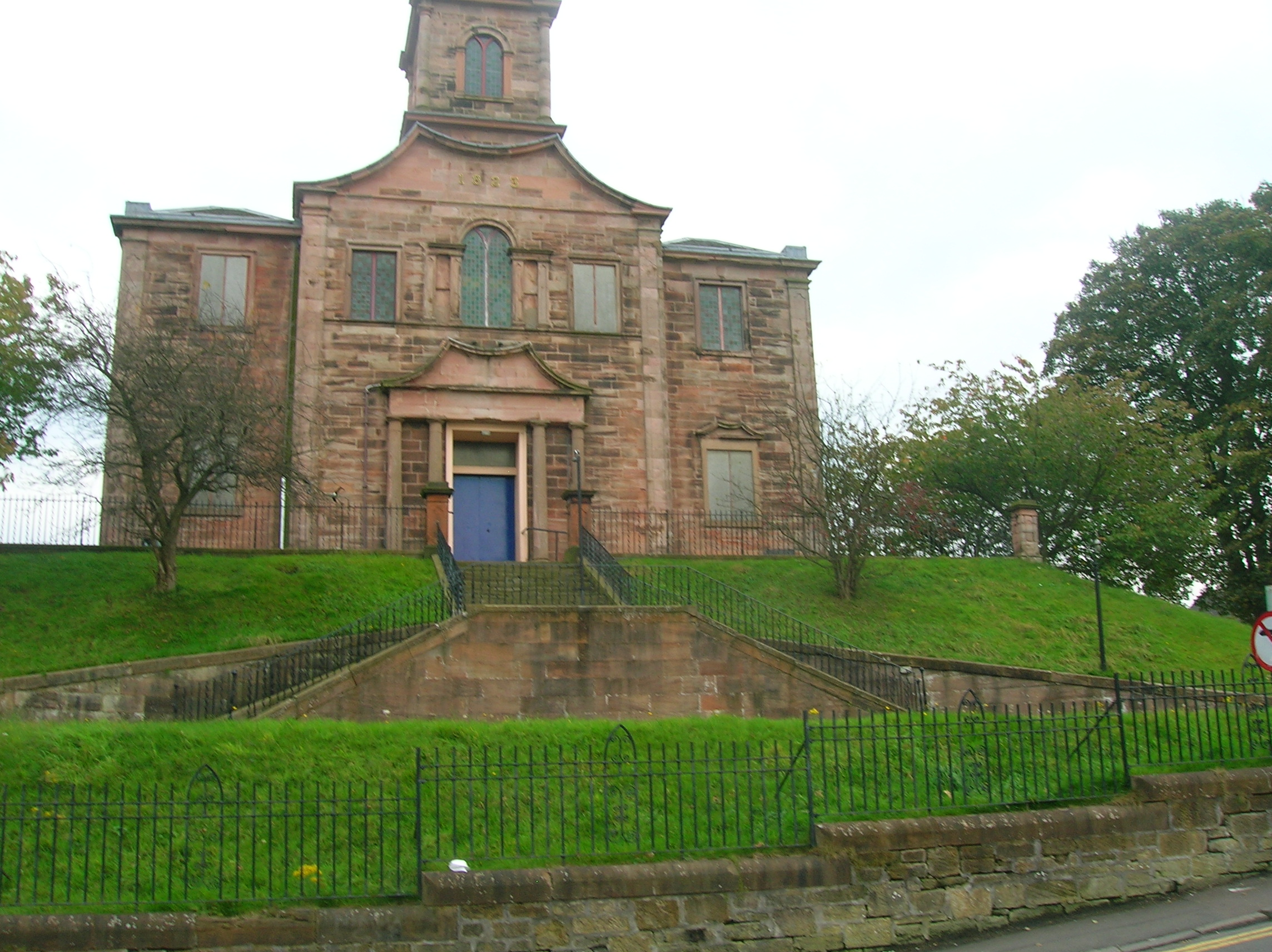
The old judgement hill at Riccarton, now topped by a church.

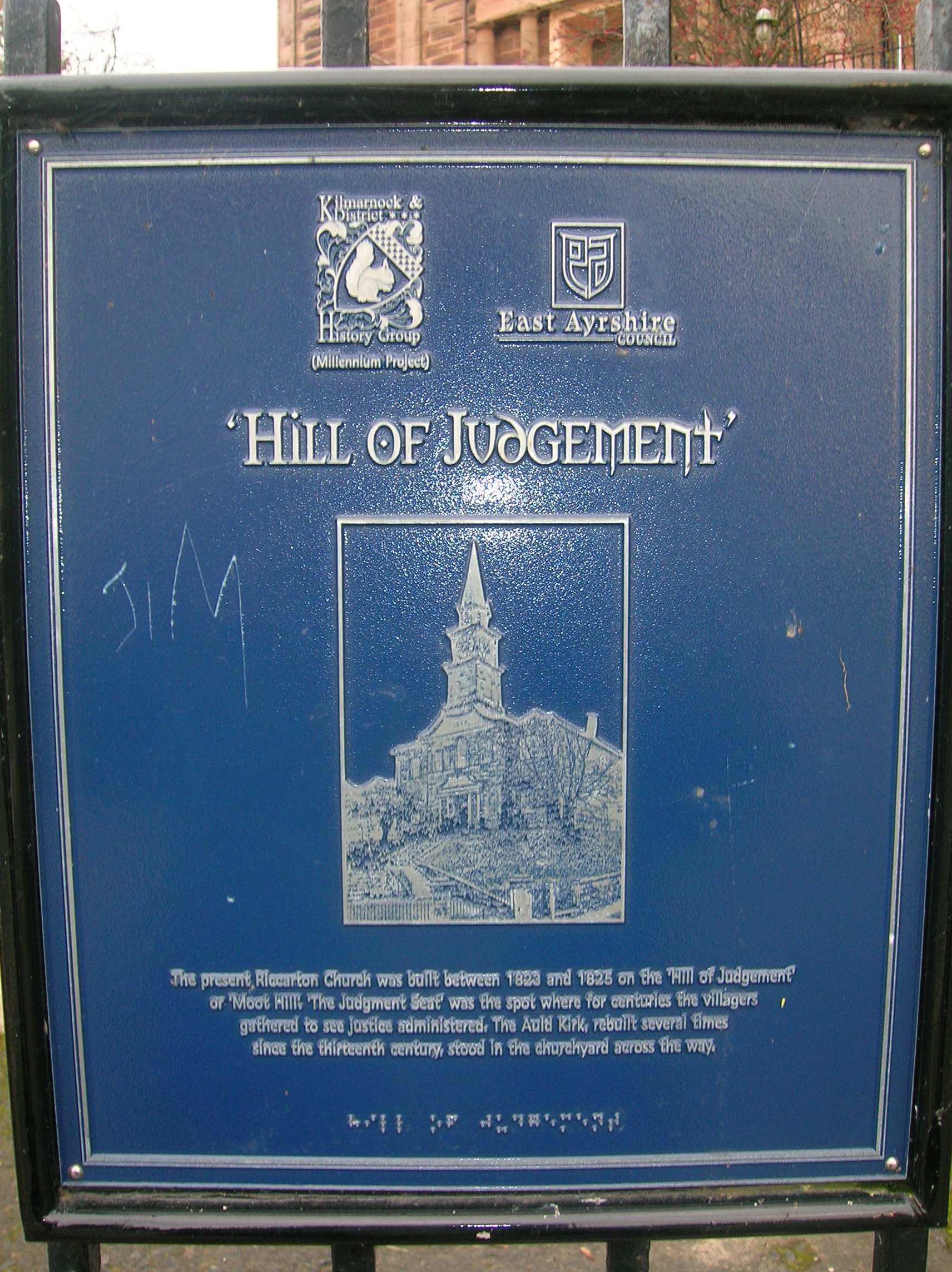
The historical plaque for the old judgement hill at Riccarton.

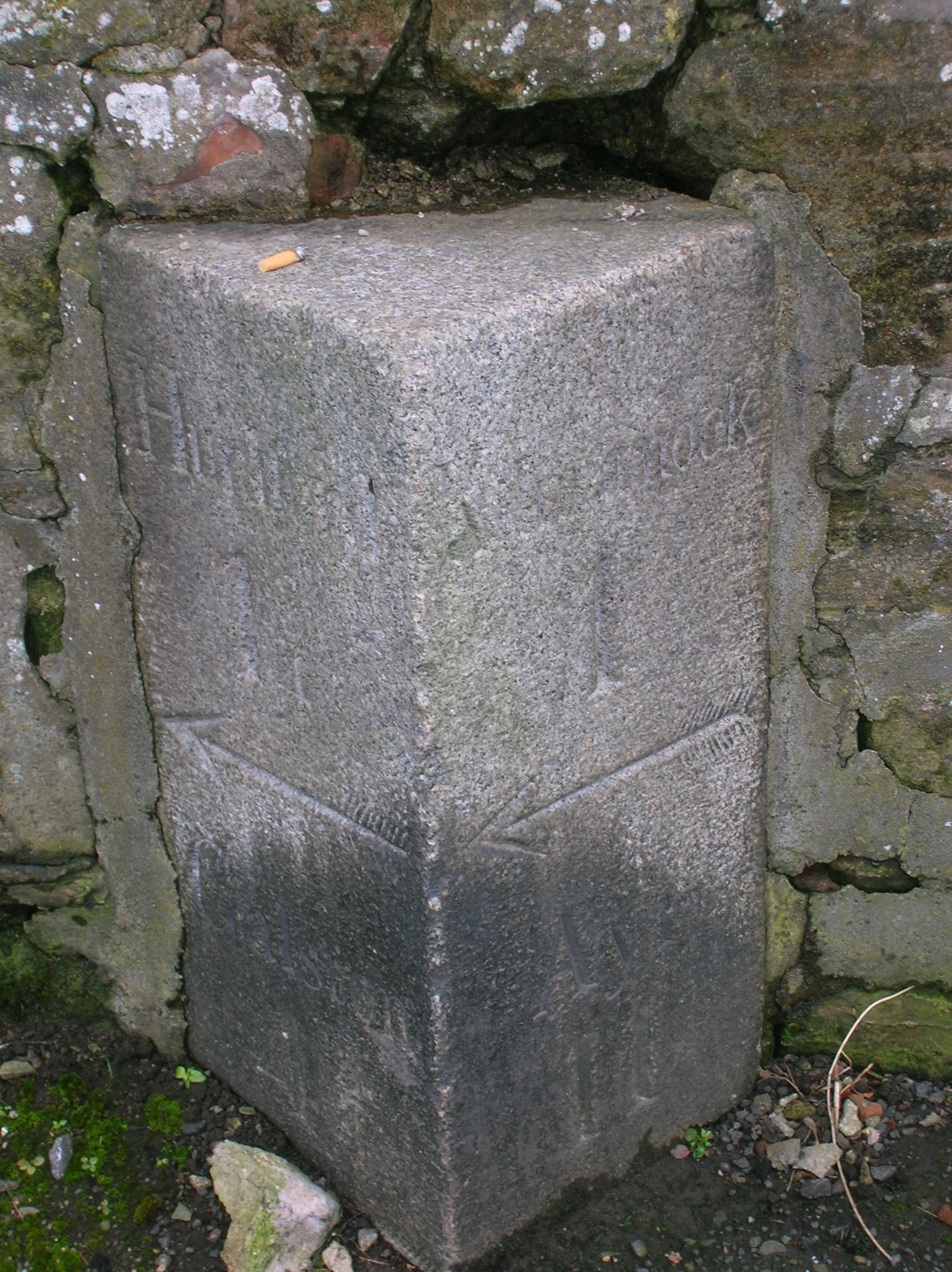
A milestone at the lazy corner near the parish kirk with directions to Kilmarnock, Hurlford, Galston and Ayr.

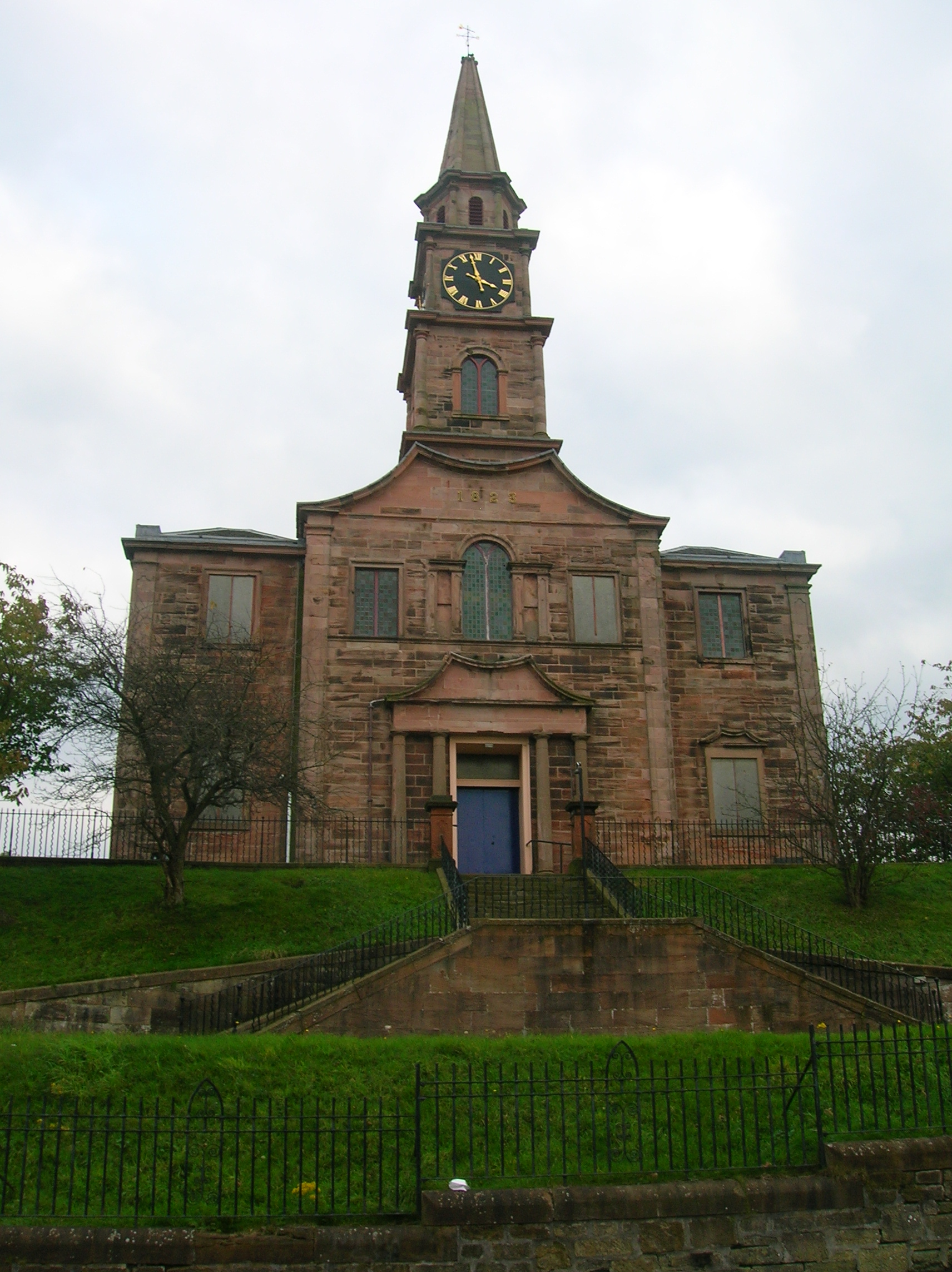
The Parish kirk on the moot hill.

=== Riccarton old bridge ===
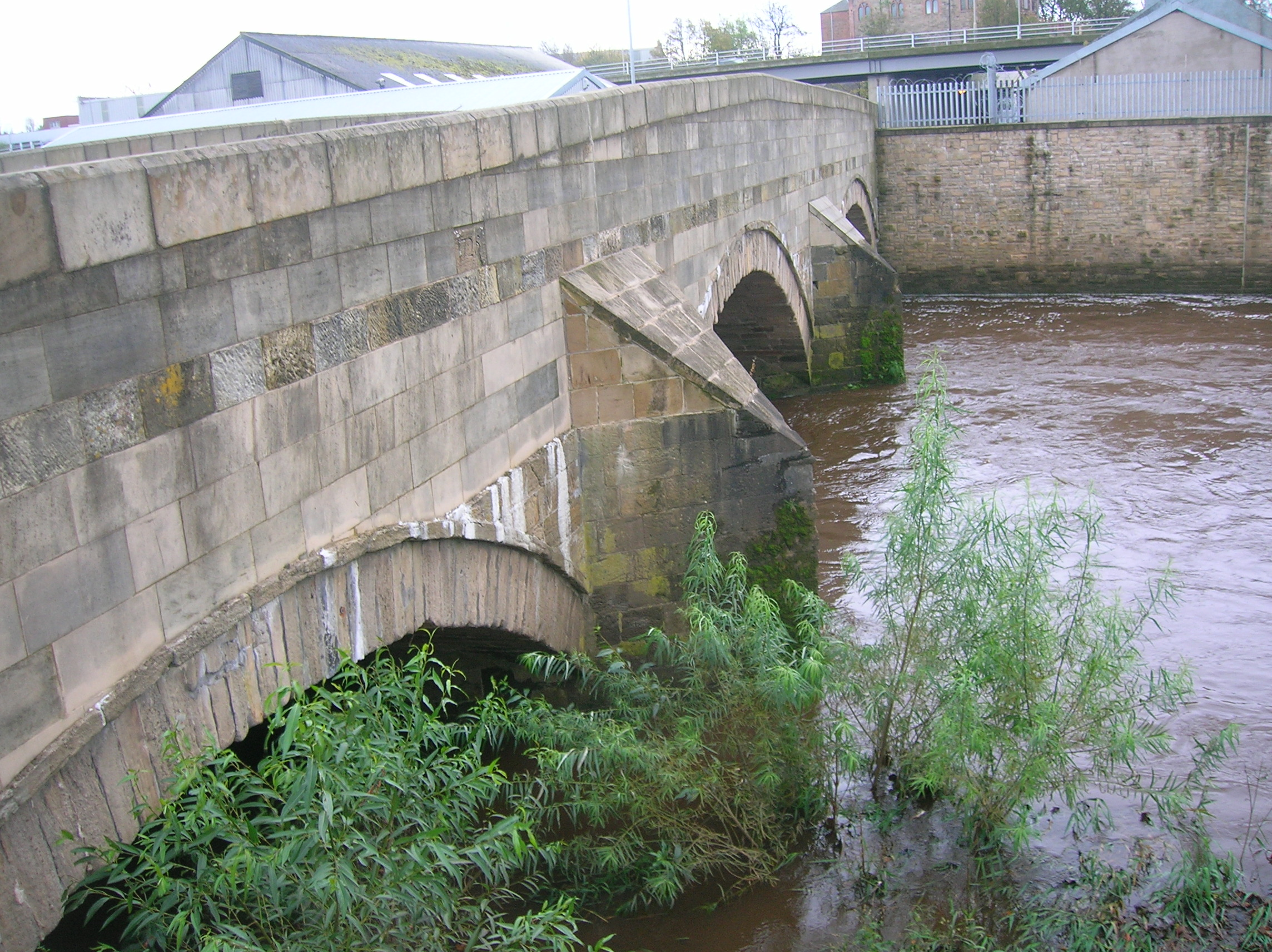
Riccarton old bridge.

Riccarton Bridge is an 18th-century 3-span, segmental arched bridge, with dressed stone arch rings, rubble spandrels and triangular cutwaters. The bridge was widened in 1806. The first recorded wheeled vehicles to be used in Ayrshire were carts offered gratis to labourers working on Riccarton Bridge, Kilmarnock, in 1726, and even then some of the labourers refused them. The 1860 OS map shows that stepping stones crossed the River Irvine just upstream of the old bridge and just before the confluence of the Kilmarnock water with the river Irvine. The 'New' Riccarton Bridge lies just downstream and dates from 1839 and was also widened.

=== The Toll Road ===
Riccarton parish was often in dispute with the Kilmarnock to Cumnock committee over the payment of so-called 'conversion' money for the Toll Road maintenance. Even after recourse to law the committee still failed to obtain any money from Riccarton and Galston parishes.

=== Riccarton mill and cottages ===
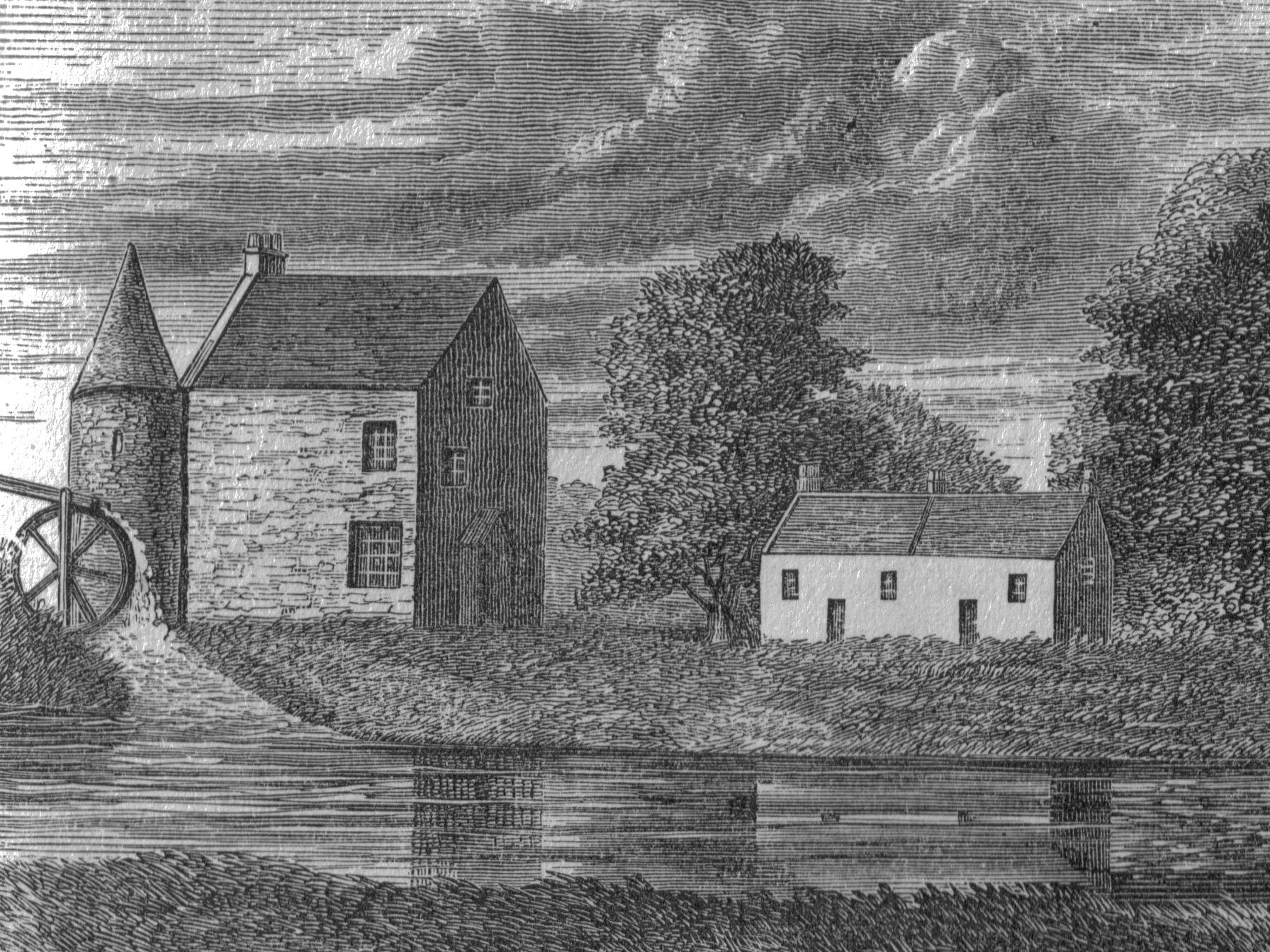
Riccarton Mill in the 1860s.

At Map reference: NS 4463 3701 lies the old Riccarton mill with its associated cottages. The mill wheel has gone and the building has been converted into a private house. One miller was named Goudie and his son was likewise a miller in Alloway until he took a lease on Burns's Cottage and ran it as a pub.

=== Riccarton Institute ===
John Galloway, Esq., of Barleith and Dollars Collieries built an institute in New Street Riccarton for the use of the working-men in the locality. The building still survives as a Community Centre run by East Ayrshire Council.

=== Riccarton and Craigie railway station ===
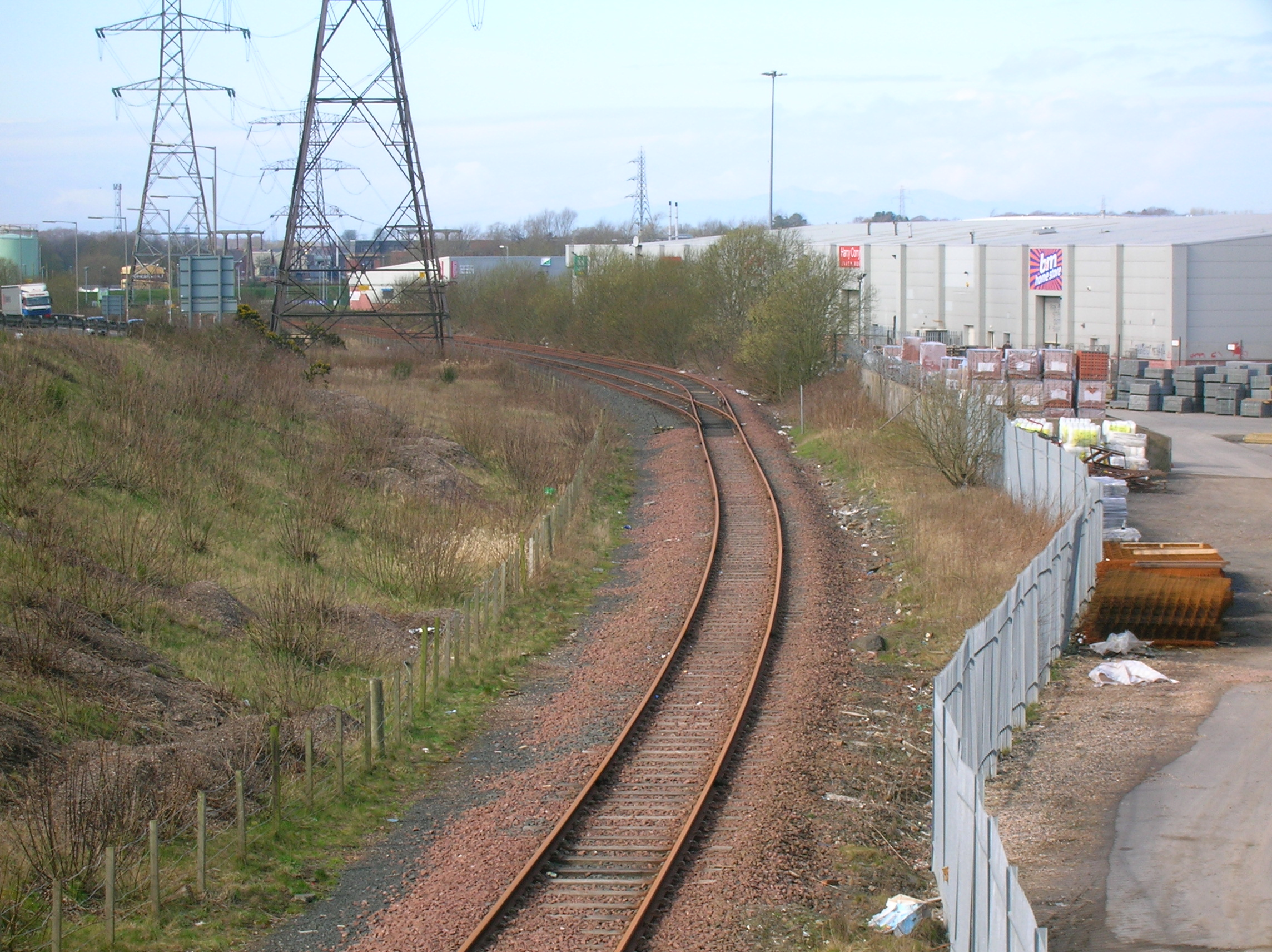
The branch leading towards the Scotfuels Depot

The village had a railway station by this name on the Gatehead and Hurlford branch of the Glasgow and South Western Railway. Part of the line remains open to supply a petrol depot in Kilmarnock. The remains of the station were extant until the new Kilmarnock bypass removed all traces. It was a goods only station (no passengers) as the line never had a publicly advertised passenger service. It is listed in 1929 as 'Riccarton and Craigie' by the London, Midland and Scottish Railway, one of the stations which the company conveyed goods to. It closed officially on 5 July 1965, originally just called Riccarton and renamed in 1905.

=== Bellfield Estate ===
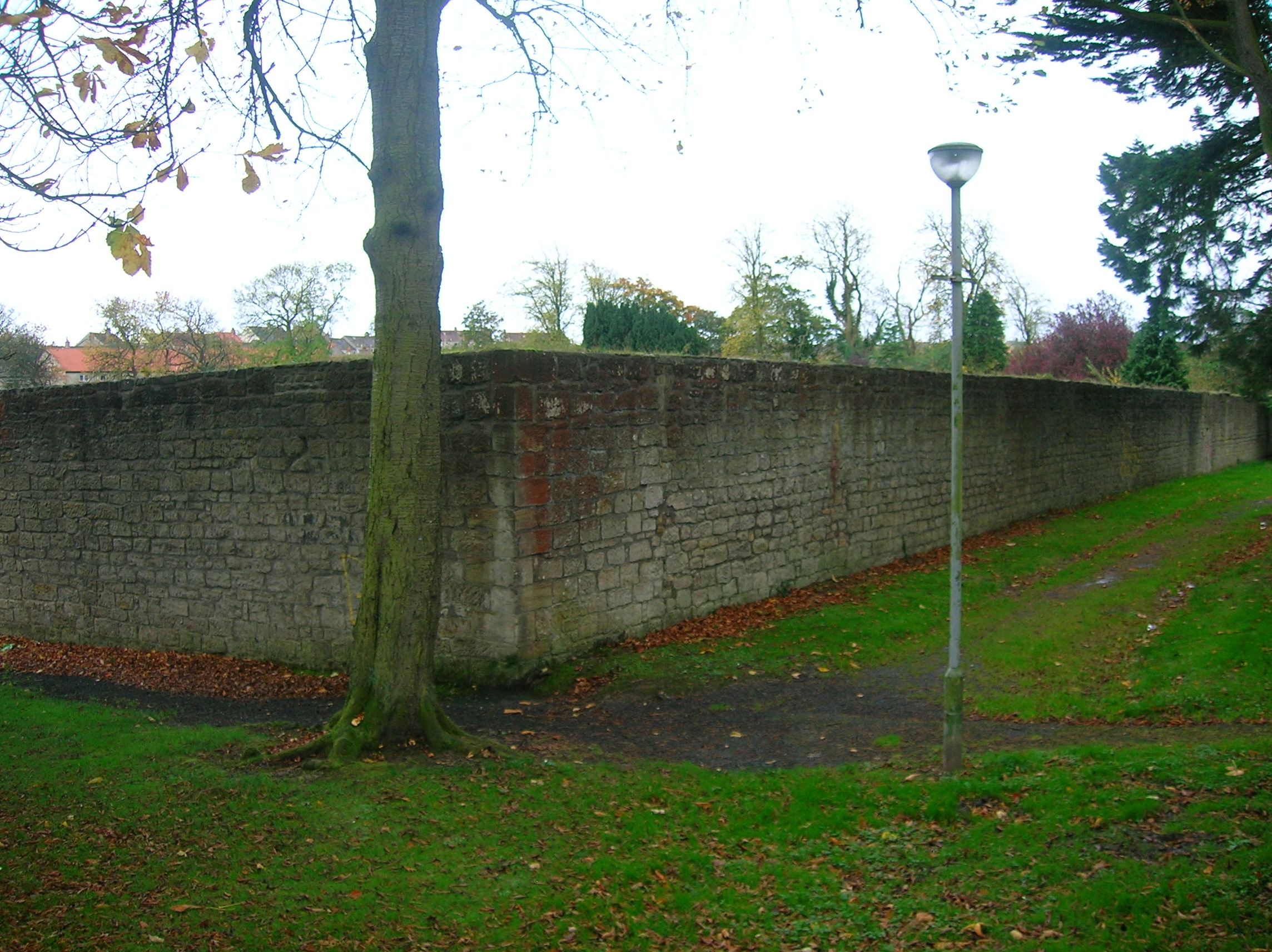
The old walled garden.

This grand Georgian mansion and its 240 acres (0.97 km^{2}) of woodlands and gardens, including a notable rock garden, were given to Kilmarnock by the Misses Buchanan, Elizabeth, Jane and Margaret, in around 1879. The ladies were the daughters of George Buchanan, a Glasgow merchant. Bellfield housing scheme borders it.

The Buchanan Bequest was donated by the Buchanan Family from Bellfield House. It contains only 100 titles, from the original 1,500 books donated, dating from 1759 to 1856; these can be found in the Ayrshire Collection at the Dick Institute. The Museum Service also has a number of items, including those on history, biographies, dictionaries, reference works, periodicals, general literature, poetry & theology, industry, agriculture & natural history, travel, topography & illustrated works.

In the 1900s Walls recalled that the Bellfield Park, adjoining, the beauty and beneficience of which touches every heart. Here flowers and plants are grown to perfection and every shrubbery cultivated and tree pruned to a nicety.

The house was demolished in 1970, much of the land was used for building council housing and the remainder is now used as a public park and playing fields.

Views of Bellfield in 2007

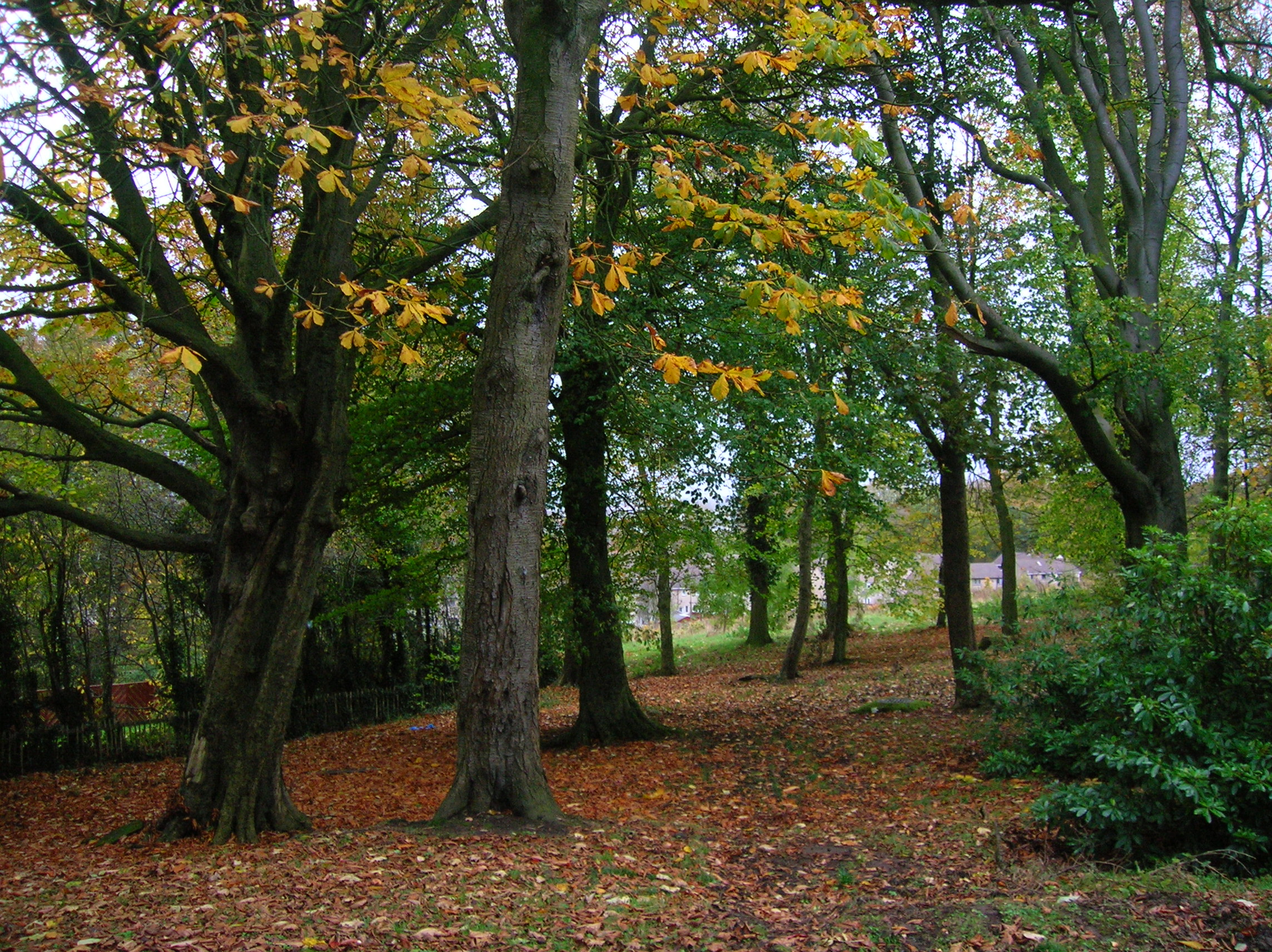
Woodlands near the old mansion house.

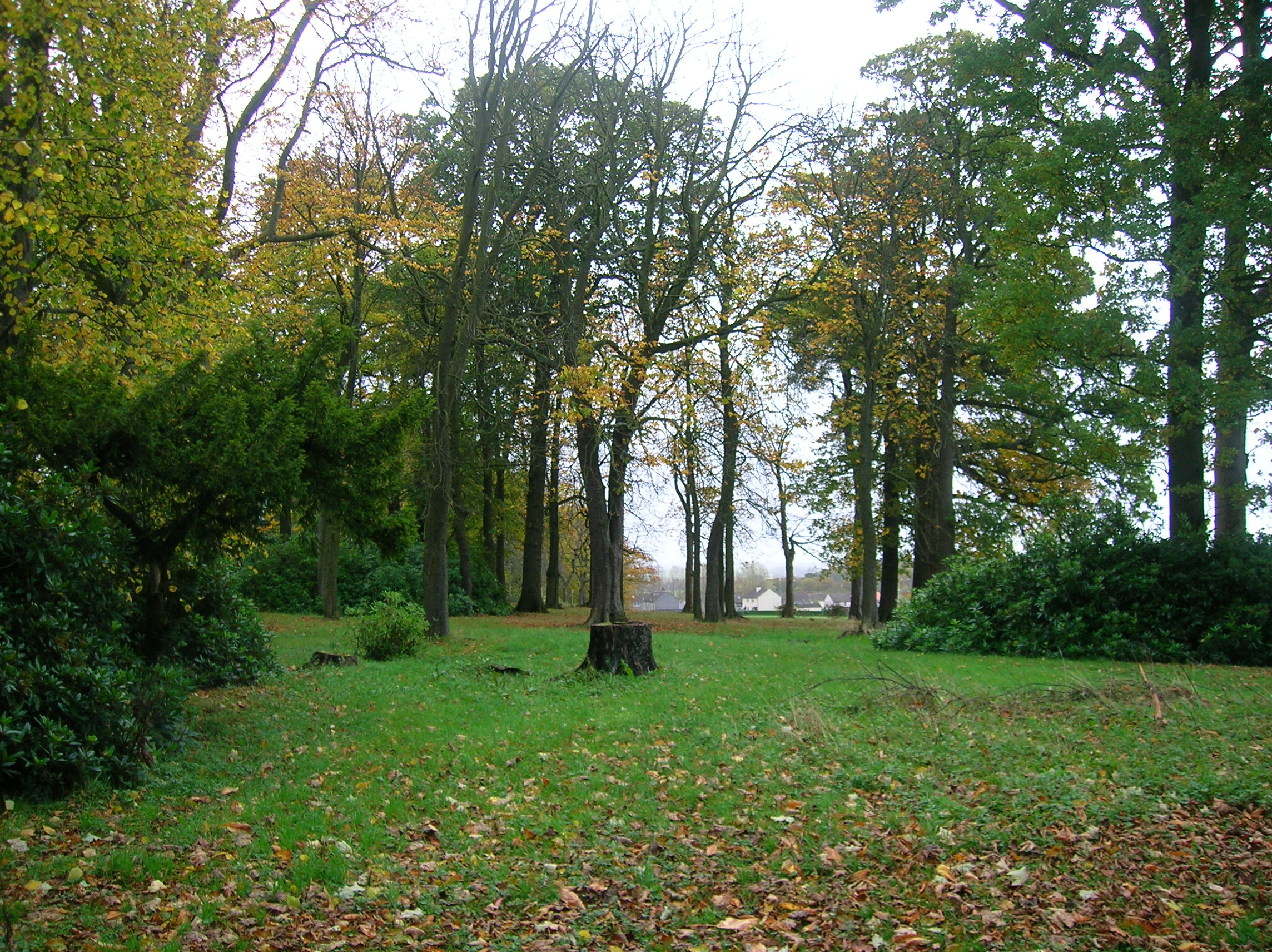
Woodlands in the old estate.

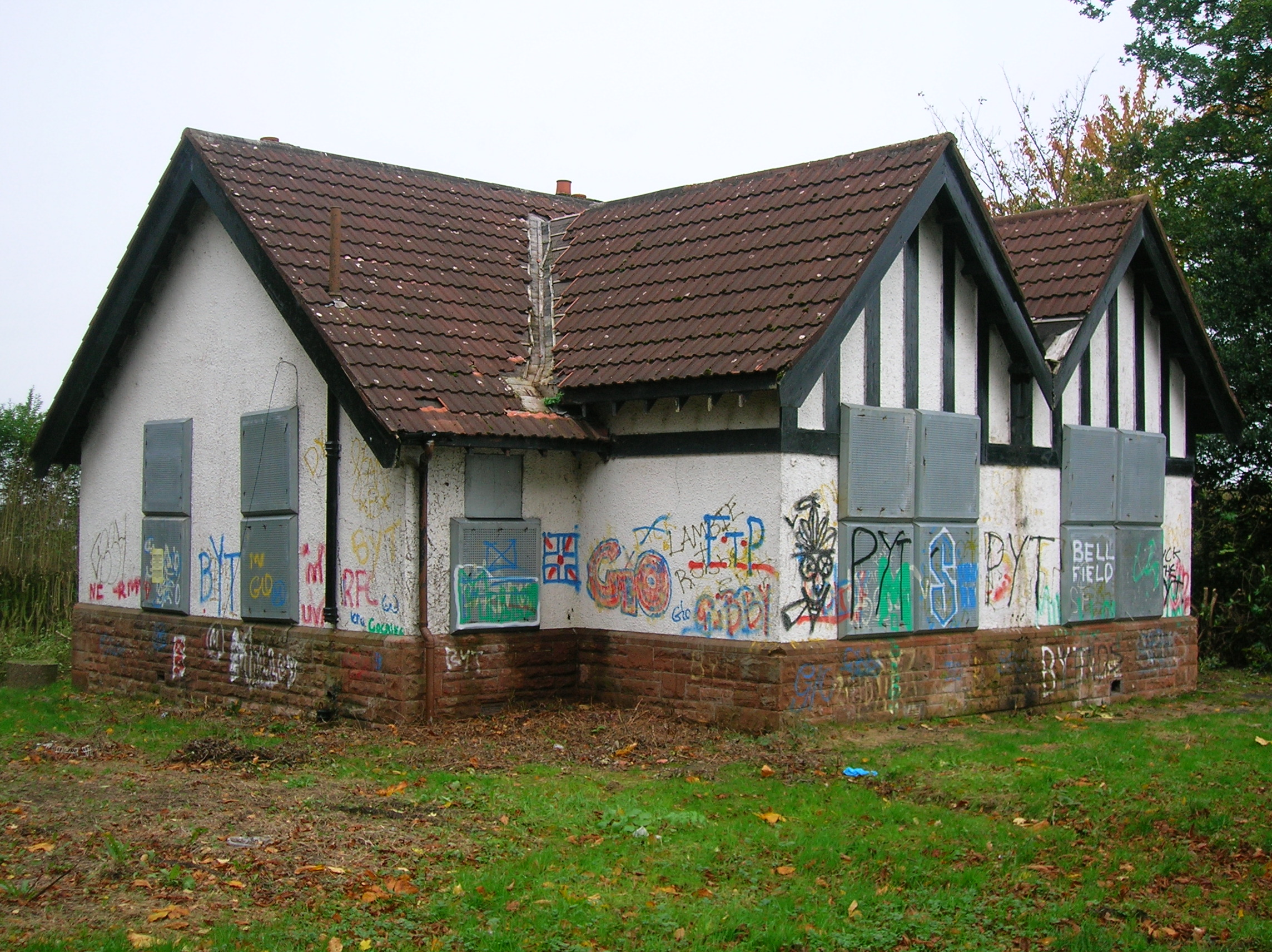
The old lodge on one of the main driveways.

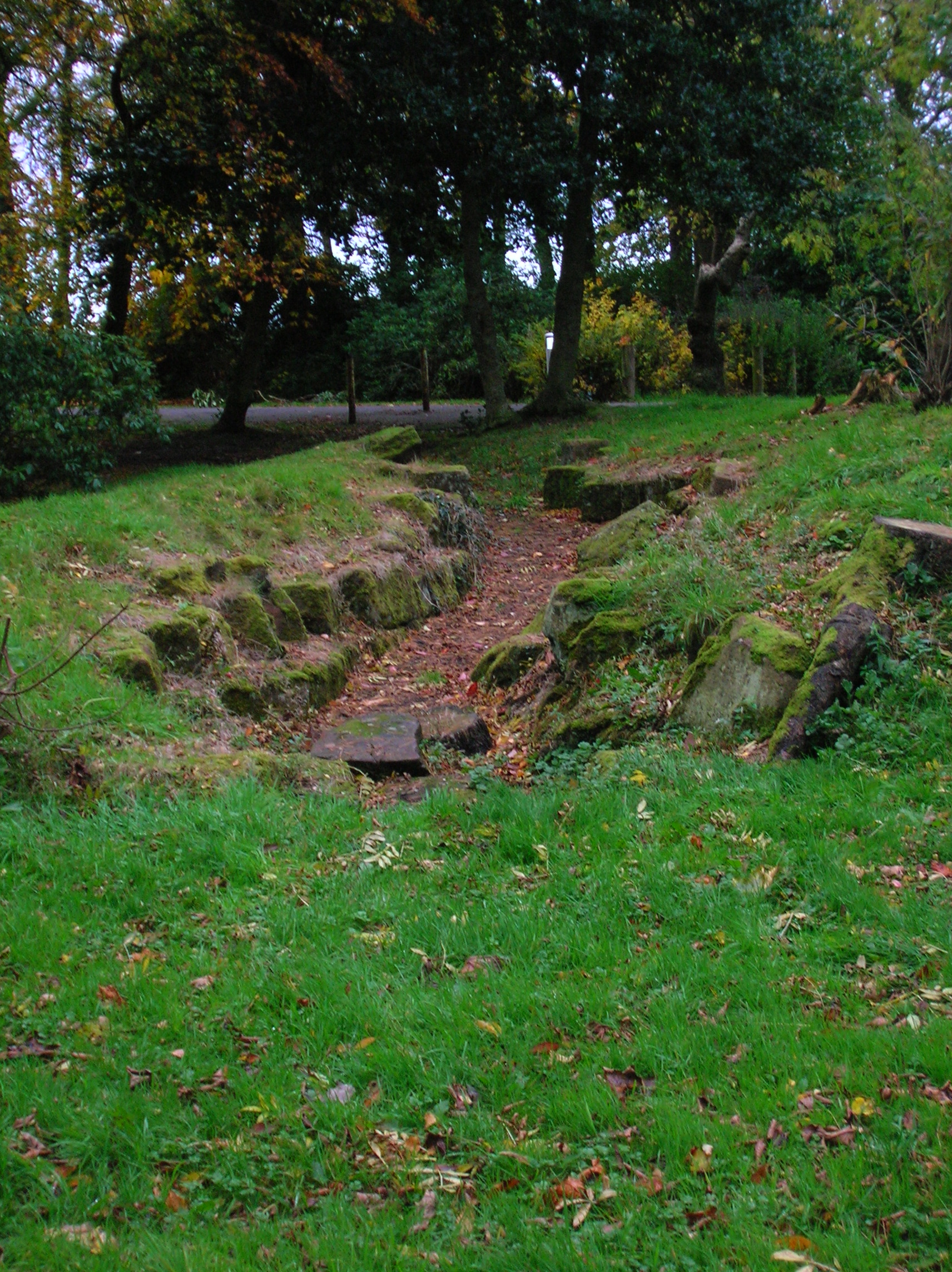
The old rockery near the demolished mansion house.

== Water courses ==
The Simon's burn runs down from near High Coodham, through the grounds of Treesbank House and then runs underground through the village and finally enters the Irvine. The Todgrige burn runs from near Muirmill Equestrian centre to join the Irvine at the Caprington Castle estate. Ainslie's map of 1821 shows a loch near Earlston, with a farm named Lochside.

== Coal and limestone mining ==
Coal existed in great abundance and was mined from a very early date. Anthracite or blind coal was chiefly mined and limestone was quarried for use as a 'manure' on the fields as well as for making mortar.

== Whitehill Loch ==
Whitehill or Hillhouse loch was located in a glacial kettle-hole above Whitehill Farm and although largely drained by the early 18th century it was used a curling site in the 19th century. A dwelling, now demolished, called Lochouse sat on the loch's outflow into the Little Sorn Burn.

== Micro-history ==
In 1848 James Young from the farm or small holding at Knowehead was murdered near Fortacres Farm by James McWheelan. He was killed whilst returning to the farm after a visit to his parents and family at Knowehead.

Riccarton is also a locality to the south-west of Edinburgh, the site of Heriot-Watt University's main campus

Riccarton Junction railway station was on the Waverley Route line built by the North British Railway. It closed in 1969.

Mr & Mrs. Campbell from Treesbank attended the Eglinton Tournament of 1839.

The 'Peace and Plenty' was a tavern on the road to Ayr near Treesbank, sitting amongst a group of cottages. The pub and cottages have long gone, however the name remains. The publican was famous for providing a free kebbuck of cheese and a scone with lunchtime pints; a custom that was quite prevalent in various parts of Scotland and England up until the 1914-1918 war.

Temple Riccarton, Temple Croft, and Temple Easter Knowhead were parts of the Lainshaw, Kirkwood, and Bridgehouse Estate. The estate had rights of peat extraction from Riccarton Moss.

== Notable residents ==
- John Deans, pioneer farmer in Canterbury, New Zealand
- Alexander Allan Stevenson, Canadian businessman, politician and military officer

== See also ==
- Blacksyke Tower
- Caprington Loch
- Craigie Castle, Ayrshire
- Earlston, East Ayrshire
- Riccarton, New Zealand
