= Alexander Allan Stevenson =

Lt. Col. Alexander Allan Stevenson (January 15, 1829 – April 9, 1910) was a Canadian businessman, politician and military officer.

Stevenson was born in Riccarton, Ayrshire, Scotland, the son of James Stevenson and Janet Francis Allan (September 10, 1786 – 1840) who married on September 23, 1814. His mother was a cousin of Robert Burns, the Scottish national poet and the aunt of Sir Hugh Allan. He was educated at local schools in Riccarton. He moved to Montreal, in 1846, and was apprenticed into the printing business. The latter half of his apprenticeship was served at the Montreal Herald. In 1853, in partnership with two others, he established a new newspaper, the Montreal Sun. Later that year, the three founded a general printing company, Moore, Owler and Stevenson, and Stevenson remained active in that business until merging it with the Montreal Printing Company in 1879.

== Military service ==
In 1855, he helped establish a local militia unit, the Montreal Field Battery (now the 2nd Field Regiment, Royal Canadian Artillery), and was promoted to lieutenant in 1856. By April 1857, he had become the artillery unit's commanding officer. In 1858, the Battery was invited to march through New York City and Boston with its flags flying—the first time British troops had been permitted to do so since the Revolution. He was commanding officer of the Battery during the Fenian raids of 1866 and 1870 and received the Canada General Service Medal. He retired as lieutenant-colonel on April 24, 1891.

== Political service ==
Stevenson was active in municipal politics, serving on the Montreal City Council (1861–67), included serving as acting mayor for a period of time. He later served as a Montreal City Alderman (1882-1898). One of his main interests in municipal government was the Montreal Fire Brigade and he supported a number of improvements including the establishment of a fire alarm system for the city. He was Chairman of the Fire Committee and in 1896 he accompanied a detachment of the Fire Brigade to London where it partook in the World Fire Congress.

Stevenson is perhaps best known for his efforts in securing Mount Royal as a public park for the city of Montreal. Since the mid-1850s, Stevenson had been a proponent of the creation of a park to protect the nature environment on Mount Royal. At the time, there were no roads to the crest of the mountain and most of the land was owned by some of the most affluent and influential businessmen in Montreal. In 1862, then Major Stevenson was ordered to stage a 100 gun salute to recognize the birthday of the Prince of Wales, the future King Edward VII, who had visited Montreal two years earlier. His orders didn't specify the locale for the salute, so Stevenson decided to use the occasion to demonstrate that Mount Royal was accessible. On November 10, 1862, the members of the Montreal Field Battery were ordered to haul four cannons through the forests that covered Mount Royal and, exactly in time for the noon-hour Royal salute by all the churches in the City, the battery fired a volley. One hour later, the full 100 gun salute was made. One year later, Stevenson ordered the battery to repeat the event, in order to keep the idea of a hill-top park alive. Mount Royal Park was formally dedicated on Queen Victoria's birthday, May 24, 1876, and Stevenson, by now a Lt. Colonel, commanded another 100-gun salute by the battery to mark the occasion.

In 1874, without his knowledge or consent, his name was submitted as the Conservative candidate for the riding of Montreal West for the federal election that year. The Liberal candidate, Frederick Mackenzie won the election but, on appeal by Stevenson, Mackenzie's election was overturned on the grounds of bribery by his agents.

In 1883, Stevenson was appointed to a Commission studying the Public Service in Quebec.

== Civic work ==
He was active in a variety of civic organizations and societies. A curling enthusiast for over 50 years, he taught the game to Prince Arthur of Connaught when the Prince resided in Canada in 1880. He was one of the founders of the Caledonia Club and went on to serve as its President for many years. In 1870, he was part of the convention in New York City that created the North America United Caledonia Association to coordinate the activities of all the clubs in Canada and the U.S. He was President of the Board of Arts and Manufactures in Lower Canada, which later became the Provincial Council of Arts and Manufacturers. He held a variety of positions, including President, on the Mechanics Institute of Montreal and the St. Andrew's Society of Montreal.

He was a Presbyterian by religion and a Conservative in politics.

He died in Montreal and the Grand Lodge of Quebec was well represented at his funeral with over 500 Masons in attendance.

== Masonic career ==
He was initiated into St. George's Lodge, No. 13 GRC (now No. 10 GRQ), Montreal, on June 15, 1856, and was WM in 1859-60 and 1862. He served in various Grand Lodge offices and was elected as Grand Master of the Grand Lodge of Canada for the 1868–69, 1869–70 and 1870–71 terms, being only thirty-nine years of age when first elected as Grand Master. He was elected an honorary member of Stevenson Lodge, No. 218 GRC, Toronto; the Lodge being named in his honor. He became a member of the Grand Lodge of Quebec after 1869.

M. W. Bro. Stevenson was thus the Grand Master at the time that a number of Quebec brethren met and formed the Grand Lodge of Quebec – a movement which paralleled the formation of the new Dominion of Canada and its several Provinces as well as the movement for independent Grand Lodges in the Maritime Provinces. Balancing disparate forces, which in the case of ten Lodges, saw them split in two over the question of remaining faithful to the Grand Lodge of Canada or supporting a new Grand Lodge in their Province. At this time there were 39 Lodges in what had become the Province of Quebec, 32 holding Warrants from the Grand Lodge of Canada, 5 from United Grand Lodge of England and 2 from the Grand Lodge of Scotland. It was not until 1874 that the long-pending difficulties between the two Grand Lodges had been settled.

M. W. Bro. Stevenson was a member of Carnarvon Chapter, No. 21 GRC (now No. 5 QR), Montreal, and was marked on May 16, 1861, taking his MEM and RAM degrees immediately thereafter. He was elected as a Past First Principal for 1862 and Grand Superintendent in 1863, when he recommended the Petition for the formation of Mount Horeb Chapter, No. 25 GRC (now No. 6 QR), Montreal. When the Grand Chapter of Quebec was formed in 1876 (following receipt of approval from the Grand Chapter of Canada) R. Ex. Comp. Stevenson served as the Grand Representative of the Grand Chapter of Pennsylvania near to the Grand Chapter of Quebec.

In Knights Templary, he was a member of Richard Coeur de Lion Preceptory, No. 7 KT, Montreal and held the office of Presiding Preceptor. He was a member of the Sovereign Great Priory of Canada, Knights Templar.
