= Wanlockhead beam engine =

Beam engine in Dumfries and Galloway, Scotland

- Straitside Lead Mine, Wanlockhead, Dumfries and Galloway, Scotland; UK grid reference NS873125
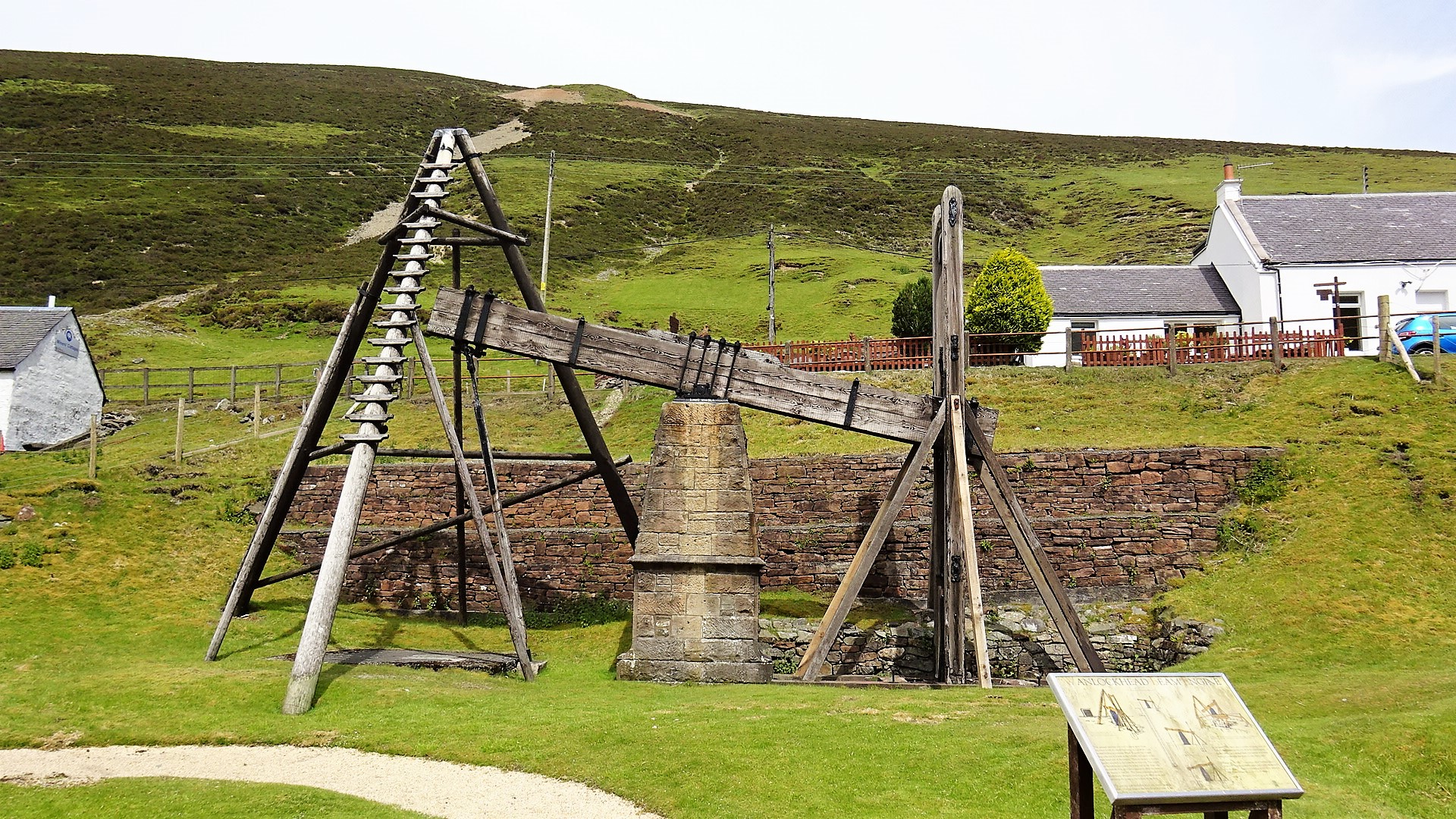

Site information
- Type: A 19th century water pumping beam engine
- Owner: Historic Environment Scotland
- Open to the public: Yes
- Condition: Restored as a stationary exhibit

Location
- Water-bucket Pumping-engine
- Location within Scotland
- Coordinates: 55.393464°N 3.7808569°W
- Height: 13 ft.

Site history
- Built: 19th century
- In use: 19th and 20th centuries
- Materials: Stone, wood and iron

The Wanlockhead beam engine (also known as the Wanlockhead water-bucket pumping-engine or Straitsteps beam engine) is located close to the Wanlock Water below Church Street on the B797 in the village of Wanlockhead, Parish of Sanquhar, Dumfries and Galloway, Scotland. The site is in the Lowther Hills above the Mennock Pass, a mile south of Leadhills in the Southern Uplands. This is the only remaining original water powered beam engine in the United Kingdom and still stands at its original location. It ceased working circa 1910 after installation circa 1870.

It is a Scheduled Industrial Monument (SM90310), considered to be of national importance and the principles by which it functioned were originally derived from attempts at producing a perpetual motion machine.

== History ==
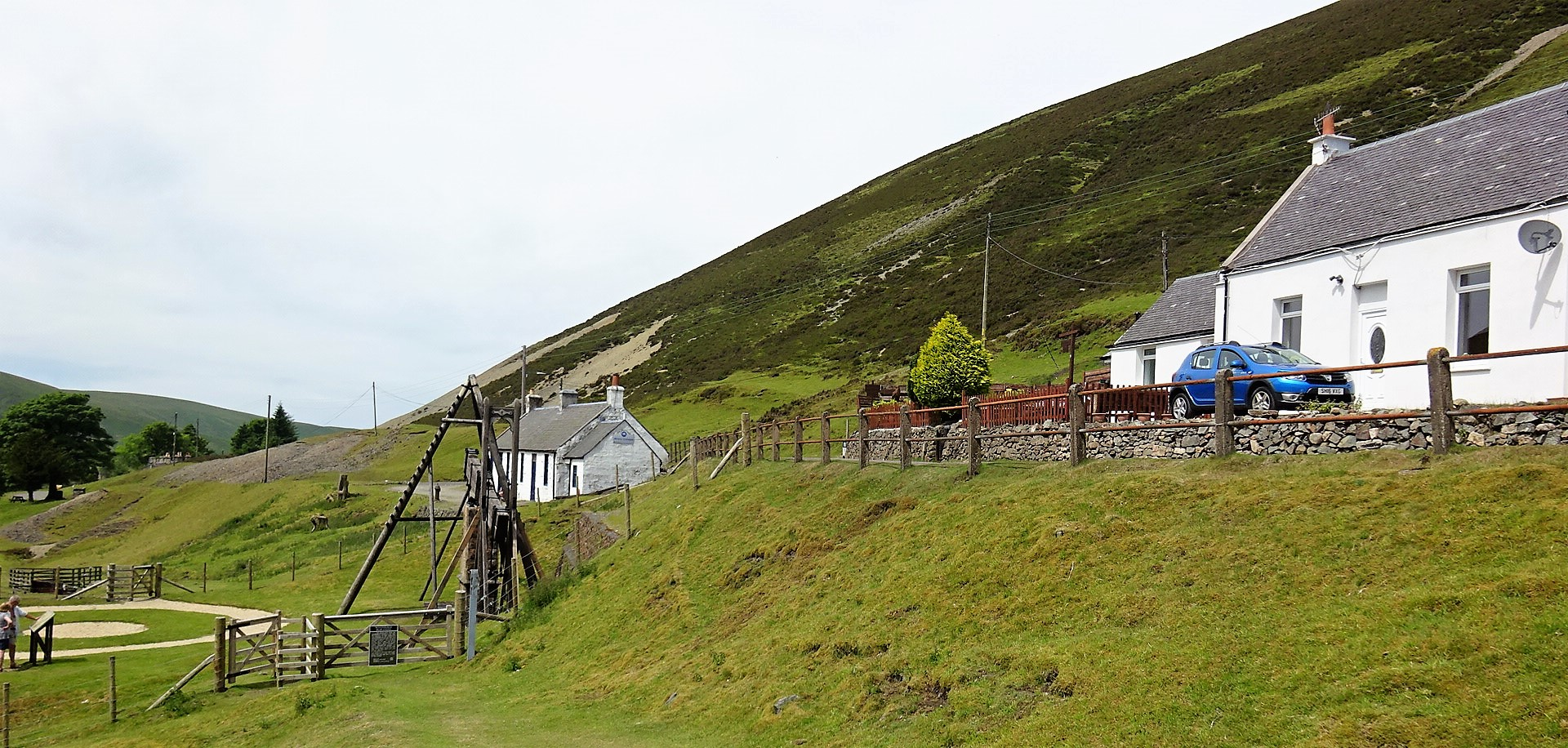
The water-bucket pumping engine and Straitsteps miners cottages

Similar water powered water pumping engines are known from as early as 1745 and an example in the 1790s is known to have been used to drain a coal mine at Canonbie, Dumfries and Galloway. They were progressively replaced by steam powered water pumps such as the 1780s example once at Earlston in East Ayrshire and now preserved in the National Museum of Scotland.

Sir James Stampfield installed hand rag-pumps that were used manually at the Straitsteps Mine between 1675 and 1684, water being drawn up by rags attached to a continuous length of rope inside a pipe that opened below the water level. Later on water power was used to work drainage pumps and then two waterwheel-powered pumping engines, known as ‘bab-gins’ were installed at Straitsteps in 1710.

By 1779 the Straitsteps mine that ran under Wanlock Dod was drained using a Boulton & Watt steam pumping engine, later replaced by a more economic and efficient Watt engine.

From 1870 until circa 1910 the Wanlockhead beam engine water pump is thought to have acted as a supplementary pump for draining water from the disused parts of Straitsteps lead mine that had first been worked as far back as 1675 and in doing so prevented the flooding of the nearby Bay Lead Mine. Traditional lead mining ceased in 1928 however lead and zinc extraction from the settling ponds only ended in 1968.

=== The Beam engine ===
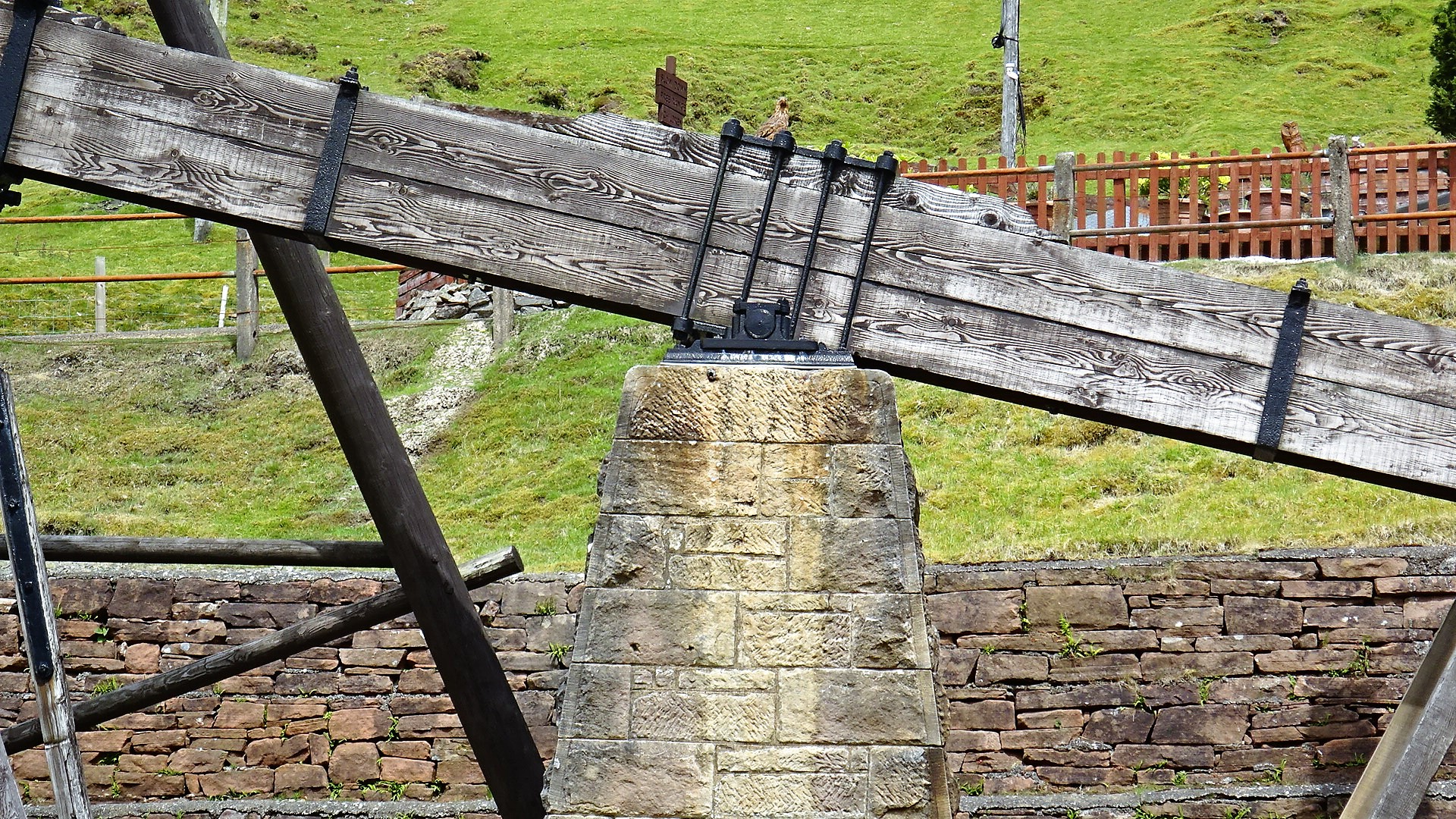
The beam, pivot and bearings.

The horizontal circa 8.5 m (27 ft) long pitch-pine beam pivots on cast-iron step plummer blocks with brass bearings and a wrought iron axle. The blocks are secured to the pillar by metal tie rods which pass right through the stone column and are tied in at the base. The aforementioned supporting column is 14 ft high and built from well dressed freestone ashlar block masonry. Two baulks of pitch pine are held together by wrought iron straps and reinforcing pads are located at the centre and beam ends.

The stone column has a decoratively carved cornice and has the general appearance of a typical 19th century railway bridge pier. A number of small locking screws can be seen and the brass bearings were clearly turned on a lathe. Wedges and cotter pins are used to hold some parts of the mechanism together. The machining of the bearings, etc. confirms the late 19th century construction of the beam engine.

The wooden parts of the structure have been replaced over the years however remains of ladders, platforms and the rest of the pumping rod may remain within the capped mine shaft. The wooden bucket on the eastern end of the beam has long since rotted however the 2m deep stone lined pit, once draining into the Wanlock Burn, still survives. The prominent wooden tripod frame with a ladder was used for maintenance of the pump rod and for adjusting or trimming the weight of the pumping rod end of the beam using smelted lead bars. This is a more recent replacement feature.

The lead tank or cistern that formed the head of water once stood on the hill above the site and was fed by a launder from the Wanlock Burn.

The stone column of another beam engine is recorded at the Bay Mine (NS868137) as well as the wheel pit of a sizable waterwheel. It is thought that the stone column is part of the atmospheric beam engine built by William Symington. It is possible that the Straitsteps beam engine had been used elsewhere before being assembled at Straitsteps.

=== Operation ===
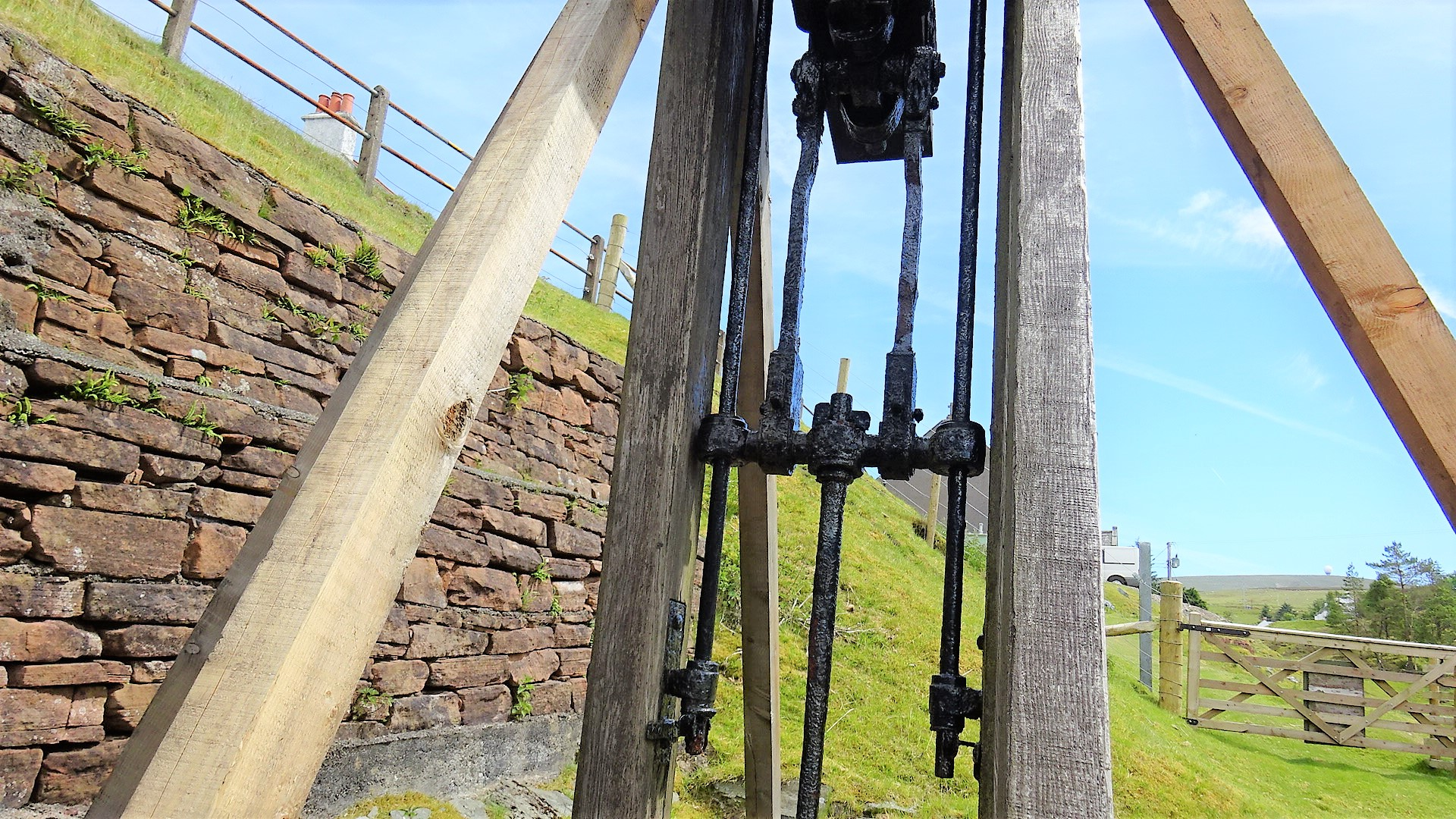
Detail of the pumping gear on the bucket end of the beam.

The ongoing running costs were minimal as the only 'fuel' was free in the form of water and therefore construction costs were the only significant outlay. Water was fed into a lead tank or cistern above the beam engine from the Wanlock Water and then passed under the road to the square bucket that was attached to the eastern end of the wooden beam. The weight of the water would eventually overcome the weight of the pumping rod attached to the western end of the beam and the upward movement would draw water up via flap valves at the rate of two to three oscillations a minute and lift around 7000 litres per hour that was released back into the Wanlock Water via a wood-lined culvert which ran underground. The water within the bucket was likewise released via a valve that was activated when the stroke reached its maximum and then the cycle was repeated. This simple operation was very reliable and ran 24 hours a day with minimum attention or maintenance.

A working model of the water-bucket pumping-engine is on display within the lead mining museum's exhibition area.

The characteristic nodding motion of the beam engine gave rise to the 'Bobbin John' nickname coined by the miners.

In front of the beam engine a double circle walkway indicates where a horse gin once stood, predating the beam engine and once used to haul miners and ore from the mine.

== Straitsteps and the miners cottages ==
A number of the original single storey miners cottages are still in use or are preserved by the Museum of Scottish Lead Mining and a semi-detached example, East and West Straitsteps Cottages, stand above the beam engine site. The name 'Straitsteps' refers to a barren section between Straitsteps and the Bay Mine of the galena vein that runs from Mennockhass through the Dod Hill and on to the Limpen Rig.

== See also ==
- Blacksyke Tower
