= Blacksyke Tower =

Blacksyke Tower Engine House
- Riccarton, East Ayrshire, Scotland; UK grid reference NS415352
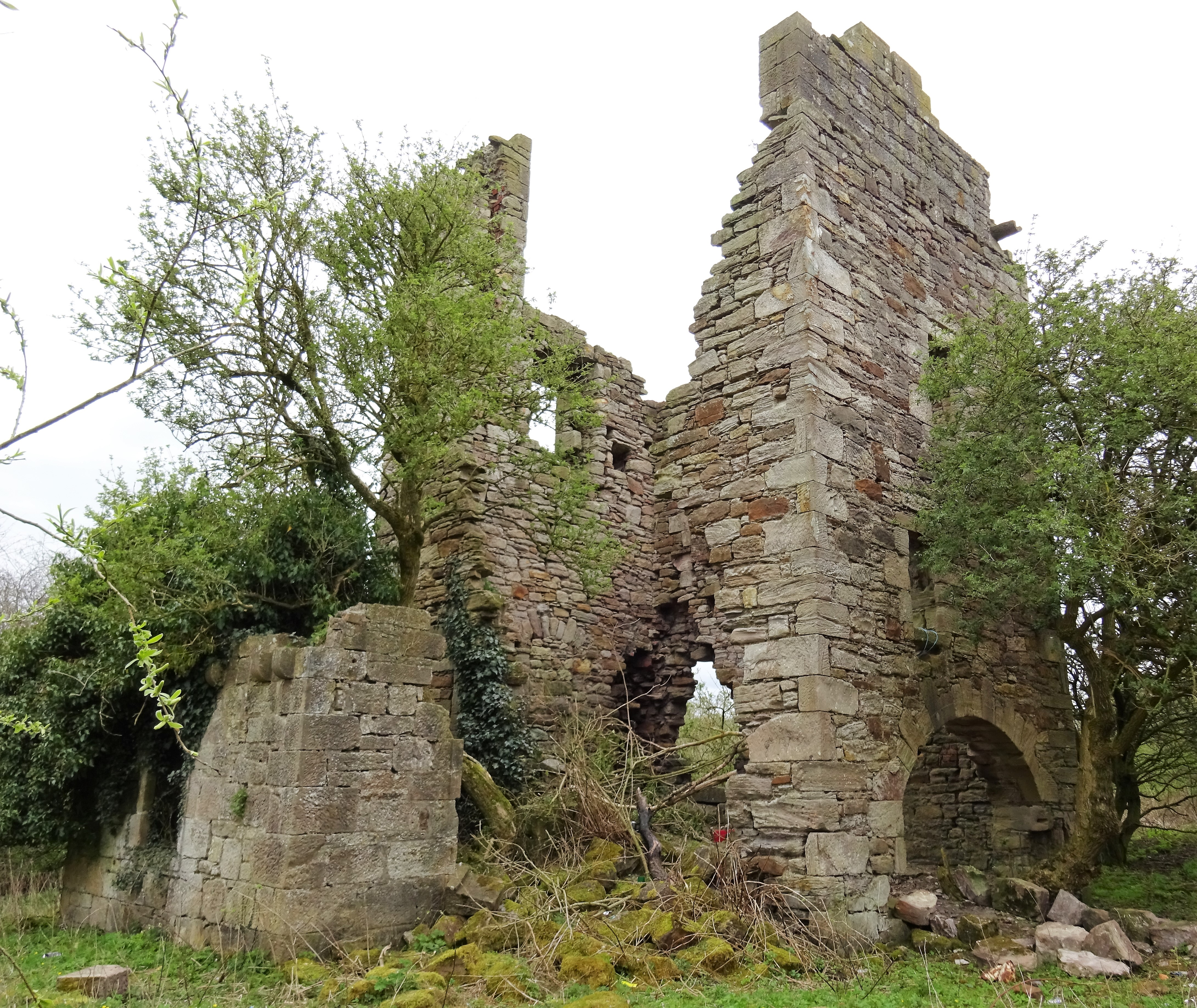
- Remnants of Blacksyke Tower

Site information
- Type: A mock Scottish Tower house or castle
- Owner: Caprington Golf Club
- Open to the public: Yes
- Condition: A ruin

Location
- Blacksyke Tower
- Location within Scotland
- Coordinates: 55.5851°N 4.5151°W

Site history
- Built: 18th century
- Built by: Cuninghames of Caprington Castle
- In use: 18th and 19th centuries
- Materials: Stone

The 1781 Blacksyke Tower, Blacksyke Engine House, Caprington Colliery Engine House or even Lusk's Folly is a Scheduled Monument associated with a double lime kiln complex in the Parish of Riccarton and is a building of national importance. The Blacksyke site is a significant survival of early coal and lime industries. The engine house's mock Gothic tower house style is very unusual and rare survival of its type. This late-18th-century engine house would be one of the oldest surviving examples of its kind in the United Kingdom. The track bed of the waggonway and several sidings that linked the complex with the Kilmarnock and Troon Railway can still be clearly made out.

== History ==
In Scots a 'syke' is a small stream, often drying up in summer, that meanders through a hollow or across flat or boggy ground and the 'black' component may suggest peaty ground. A fair description of this low-lying area prone to flooding.

=== The Blacksyke Tower ===
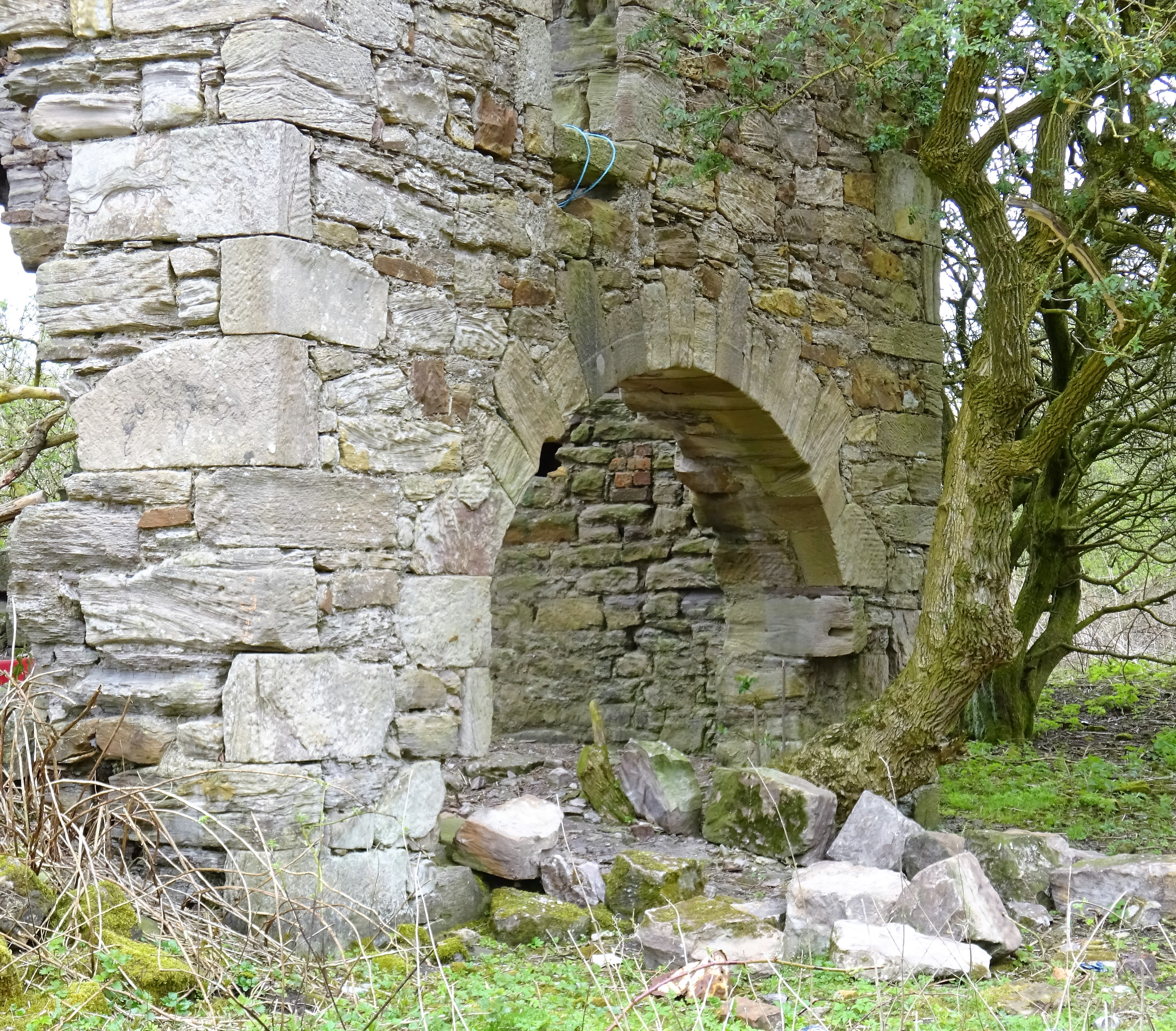
The ground floor and access arch

A Newcomen atmospheric pumping engine was installed here in 1781, used to remove water that entered the workings in this low-lying area and owing to its prominent location in the Caprington Castle estate grounds it was camouflaged to look like a folly of a typical Scottish tower house although the wooded nature of the estate and its distance from Caprington Castle would not have necessarily interfered with the view from the home of the estate owners. The upper part of the building is thought to have been added to add the effect of a romantic ruin and the change in stone can be seen at the two gable ends.

The Carron Iron Works supplied the engine at a time when the more efficient Boulton and Watt steam engines were available however coal was plentiful on site and an annual patent payment was not required for Newcomen engines. The Newcomen engine drained the mine to a depth of around 50 metres which was sufficient to allow the miners to work the Blind Coal seam.

The engine house ruins show that a considerable amount of attention to detail was undertaken to build the tower house with an authentic appearance, although the walls are not unduly thick, with a reportedly vaulted ground level, a water spout; randomly placed windows; a corbelled parapet on the east and south side; crow-stepped gables and on the north-east a turret that was once a chimney as evidenced by soot within and two access flue, one from within the main building. The four walls of this rectangular structure (6.0 by 8.0m and only 0.7m thick) were rubble-built and the corners have dressed stone quoins. The south-facing gable end has a crow-step feature which is slightly offset from the main wall and has the roof angle trace marked upon it. The stone type and quality of the crow-step feature and the side building to the west suggest that they were later structures and that the castle-features were a later addition to a previously normal engine house. The iron supports for a drainpipe are located on the south-facing gable end.

A similarly built lower lean-to building, with corbels, adjoins the western side of the tower, which may have later housed the supply of coal or a boiler and furnace. The lean-to building to the west shows evidence of being a later addition as it encloses has a blocked up window in the main tower. An entry to the soot-stained chimney flu is also present here indicating the presence of a fire producing waste gases. A more powerful replacement James Watt steam engine would require a much larger boiler and this would require the later addition of a new building with a connection to the chimney as is found here. James Watt's patent expired in the year 1800.

A substantial arch gives access to the south-facing ground floor level, typical of many engine houses. A lean-to building is shown on the east side in the 1850s and two rectangular water bodies with a path running from the intersection of the engine house and the supposed farm building to a detached small square roofed building.

It is recorded that a flag pole on the tower was used to signal that coal was waiting to be uplifted and wagons would be hauled to the colliery along the railway, making it an early form of signal box and it is also suggested that tokens were given in at the tower for each wagon as a way of keeping a tally of the number of loads of coal produced. A coal pit lay just to the east of the tower.

A number of alterations have taken place over the years with several windows and a door blocked up with stone and it was used as a store. The tower stands close to a set of buildings that included a school, later becoming a Sunday school and the changes it exhibits suggest that a later use was found for the building. The building is stated to have served as a workshop for the coalfield and the nearby buildings were offices. The remains of a flag pole are still present on the north-east turret. The school may have also been used for pupils from Earlston that is located near by and easily reached via the trackbed of the old railway.

=== The Earlston Newcomen Atmospheric Beam engine ===
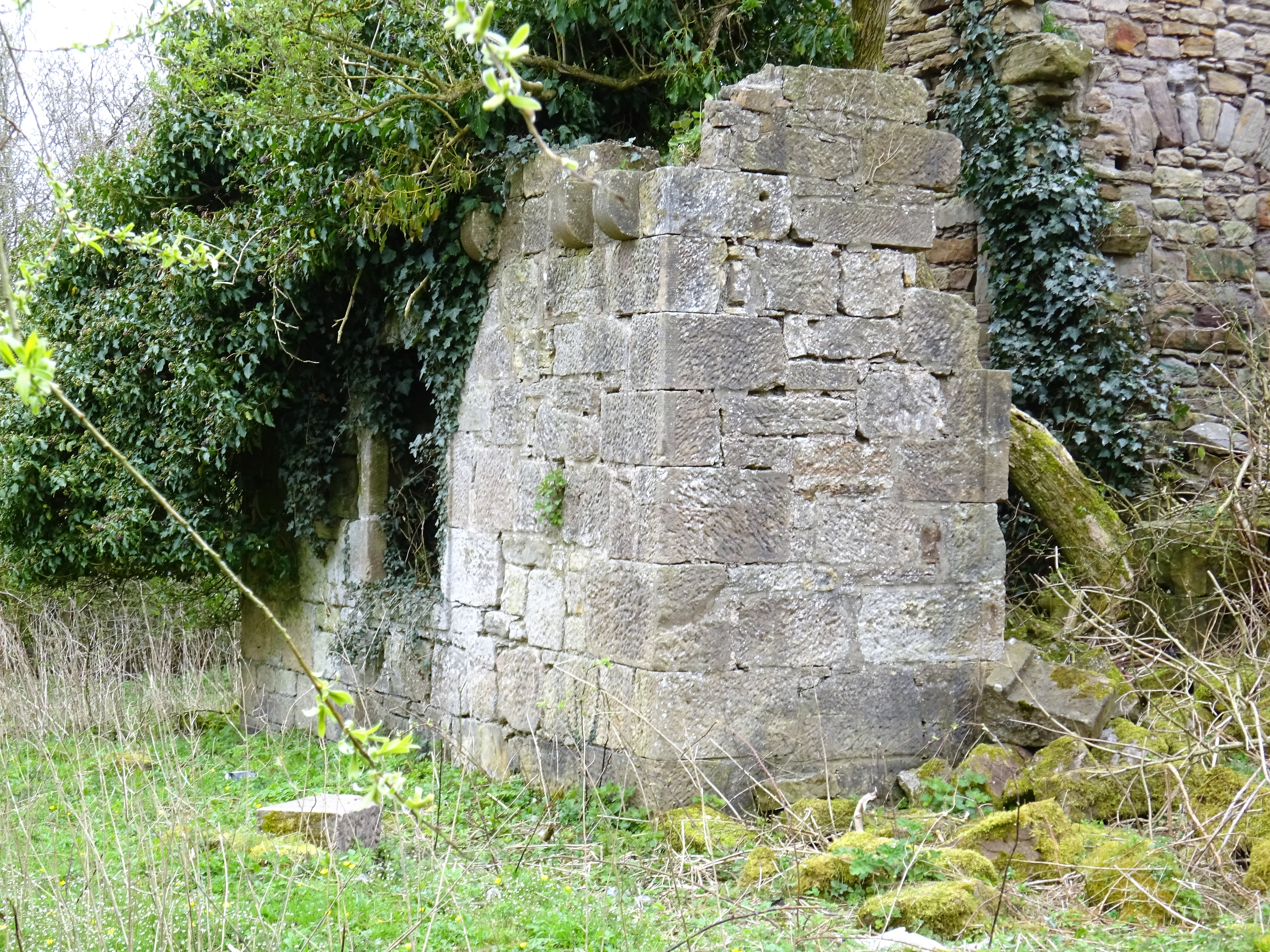
The added side building with castellated features

The location of the site from which the 1770s Newcomen Atmospheric Beam engine now housed in the National Museum of Scotland originally came was the 'Caprington Colliery' with its numerous pits and the pumping engine located in Earlston and an old photograph of that engine house that does not resemble the Blacksyke Tower. This engine was donated by Colonel Cuninghame of Caprington to the town of Kilmarnock in 1901 after it had worked for 95 years and after some restoration work by Glenfield and Kennedy it was housed in the Dick Institute for many years until it was considered unsafe and donated to the National Museum of Scotland in 1958. In 1998 it was restored and placed on display with a partial replica engine house and powered by electricity (see videos).

The engine had its wooden beam replaced by a cast-iron one in 1837 and the 96-inch-long cast iron cylinder had a 30-inch bore and a stroke of 54 to 60 inches. It is not clear where the water was pumped to as no streams are shown in the immediate area although two artificial water bodies or tanks are shown near by.

== The Lime Kilns ==
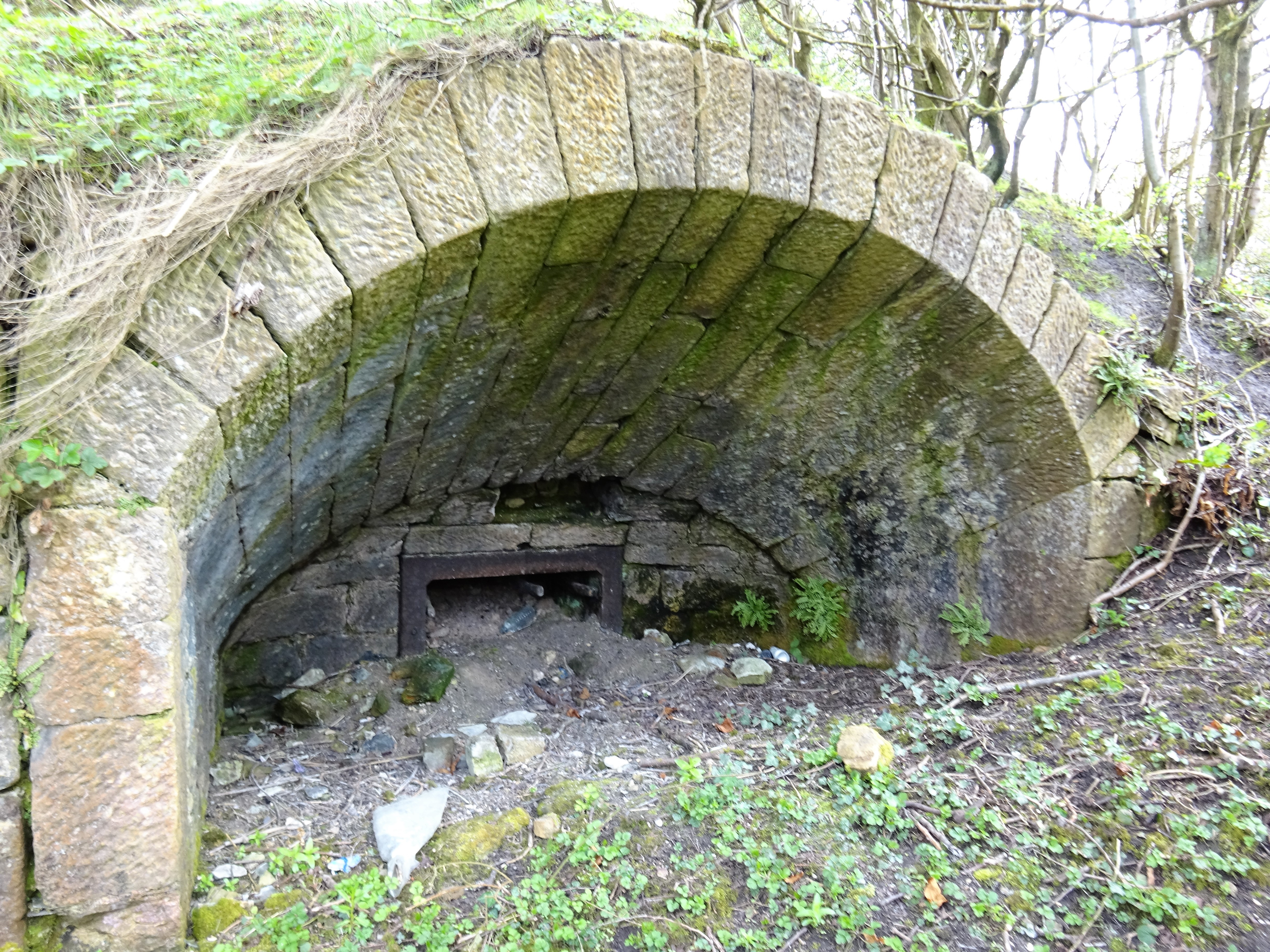
The kiln eye, metal box and bars

The twin lime kiln is shown on the first 1860 OS map, but was disused and the waggonways lifted by the time of the OS Second Edition map of 1897. An inclined embankment runs up to the top of the lime kilns up which wagons would have carried coal and limestone to charge the kilns. The kiln eyes are still in good condition and unusually the rectangular iron box and grate bars from which the quicklime was removed, a hazardous procedure, especially in wet weather. A railway line ran to the north-west and north-east so that the lime kiln sat in a V-shaped area between them.

Poor-quality coal was often used, and the smoke from the kilns was very polluting, a constant hazard as the kilns were operational continuously for a week or so at a time. Water was added and the resultant slaked lime was used for lime-washing walls or for spreading on acid ground to reduce acidity and improve soil structure. Quicklime could also spread directly on the ground and in the eighteenth century, its use was often a requirement set down in farm leases.

== The rail network ==
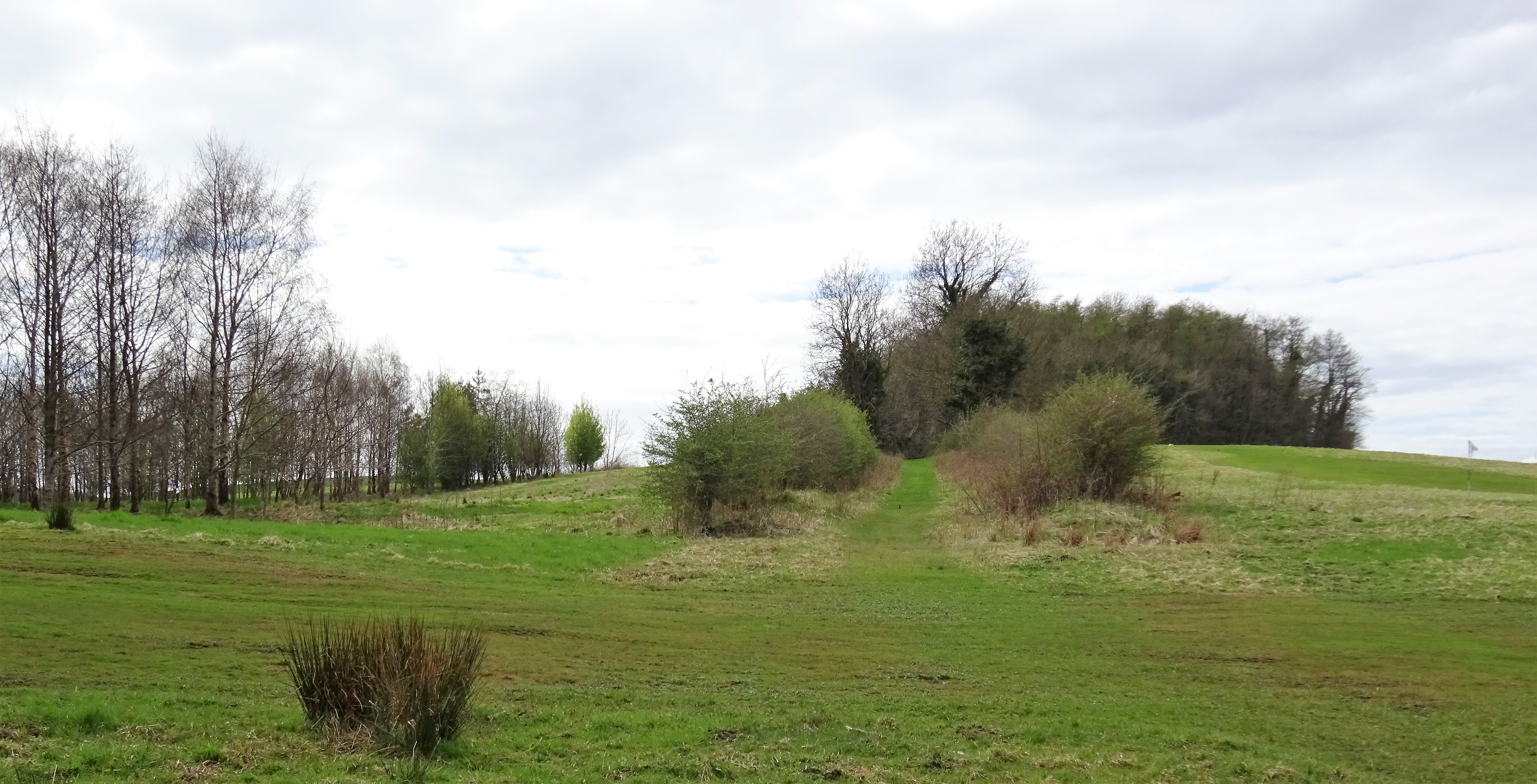
The route of the old railway running west from the tower.

Sir William Cuninghame of Caprington Castle opened the 4-km or 2.5-mile long horse drawn mineral Fairlie Branch off the Kilmarnock and Troon Railway that ran across the River Irvine to the collieries in the Fairlie area in 1818. The tower was built before this time although it may have undergone alterations. This line became the standard gauge Fairlie Branch of the Glasgow and South-Western Railway with an extensive network of lines serving a number of coal pits, at least nine, one line running on through Earlston to Blacksyke and beyond.

By 1896 the rail network had been lifted on the 'Earlston' branch although it remained in use as far as the Earlston sawmill. Part of the old line is a public footpath and its course is marked by single or double hedgerows.

== Blacksyke and the miners Rows ==
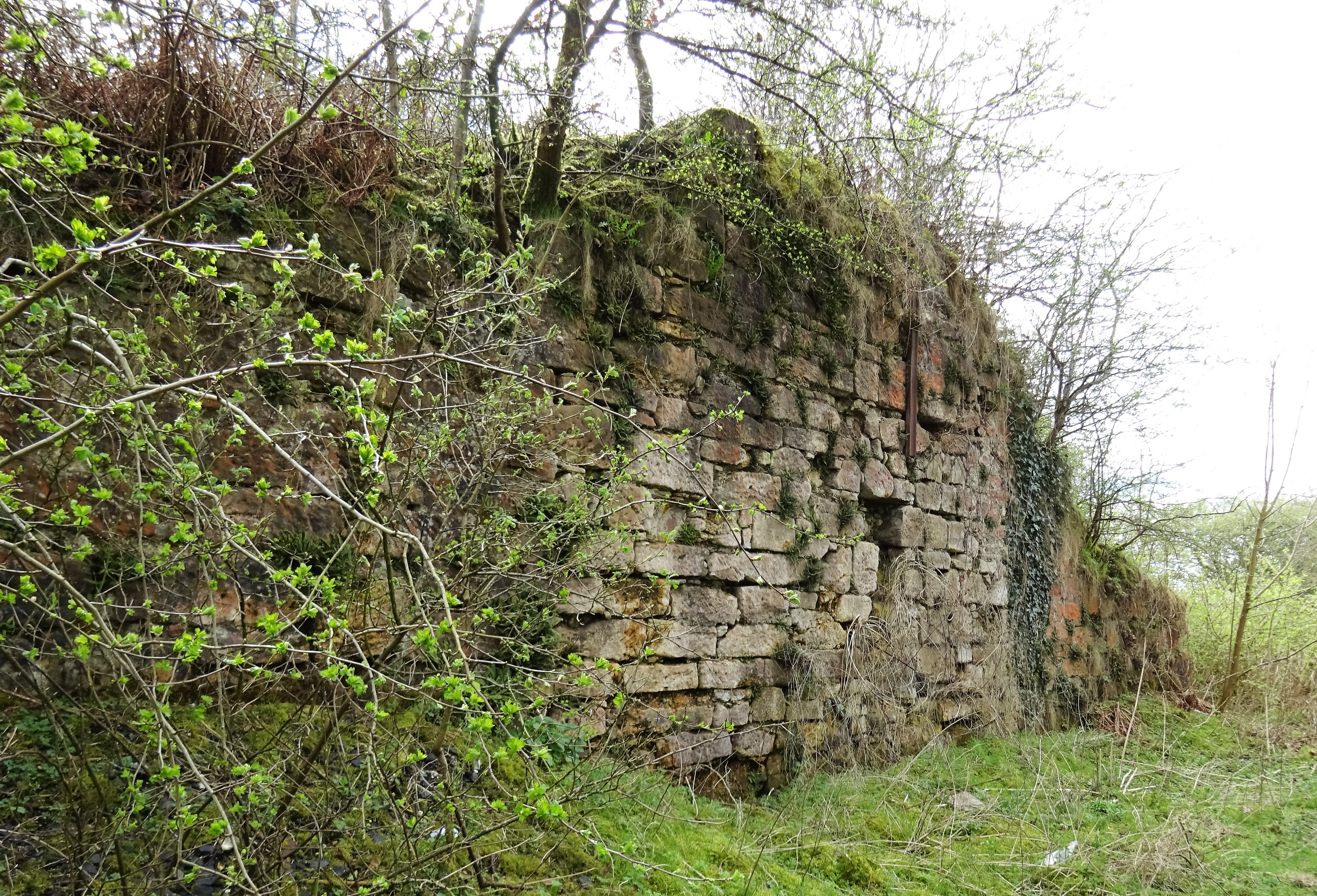
The north-western end wall of the lime kilns

The ruins of a fairly substantial and basically U-shaped building, probably once a farm, survives at Blacksyke, located close by and slightly to the south-east of the tower and once connected by a lane to the nearby Ayr Road. An attached building is recorded on the 1896 OS maps as a school for the children of the colliers, estate workers, etc. and in 1908 it is shown as a Sunday School as by this time the local pits had closed. The OS Name Book of 1855-57 records that the old farm was occupied by labourers employed by the then proprietor Thomas Smith Cunningham Esq. of Caprington Castle.

The Burnbank miners or colliers row known as the 'Peace and Plenty' stood on the Ayr Road opposite Loreny. Blacksyke is shown on the 1832 map by Thomson. The small miners' row at Laputa once lay further down on the west side of the road to Ayr. This unusual name may relate to the flying island of Laputa in the 1726 book Gulliver's Travels by Jonathan Swift.

== See also ==
- Caprington Loch
