= Caprington Castle =

Castle in East Ayrshire, Scotland

Coordinates: 55.5938°N 4.5283°W

Designations

Inventory of Gardens and Designed Landscapes in Scotland
- Official name: Caprington Castle
- Designated: 30 March 2006
- Reference no.: GDL00084

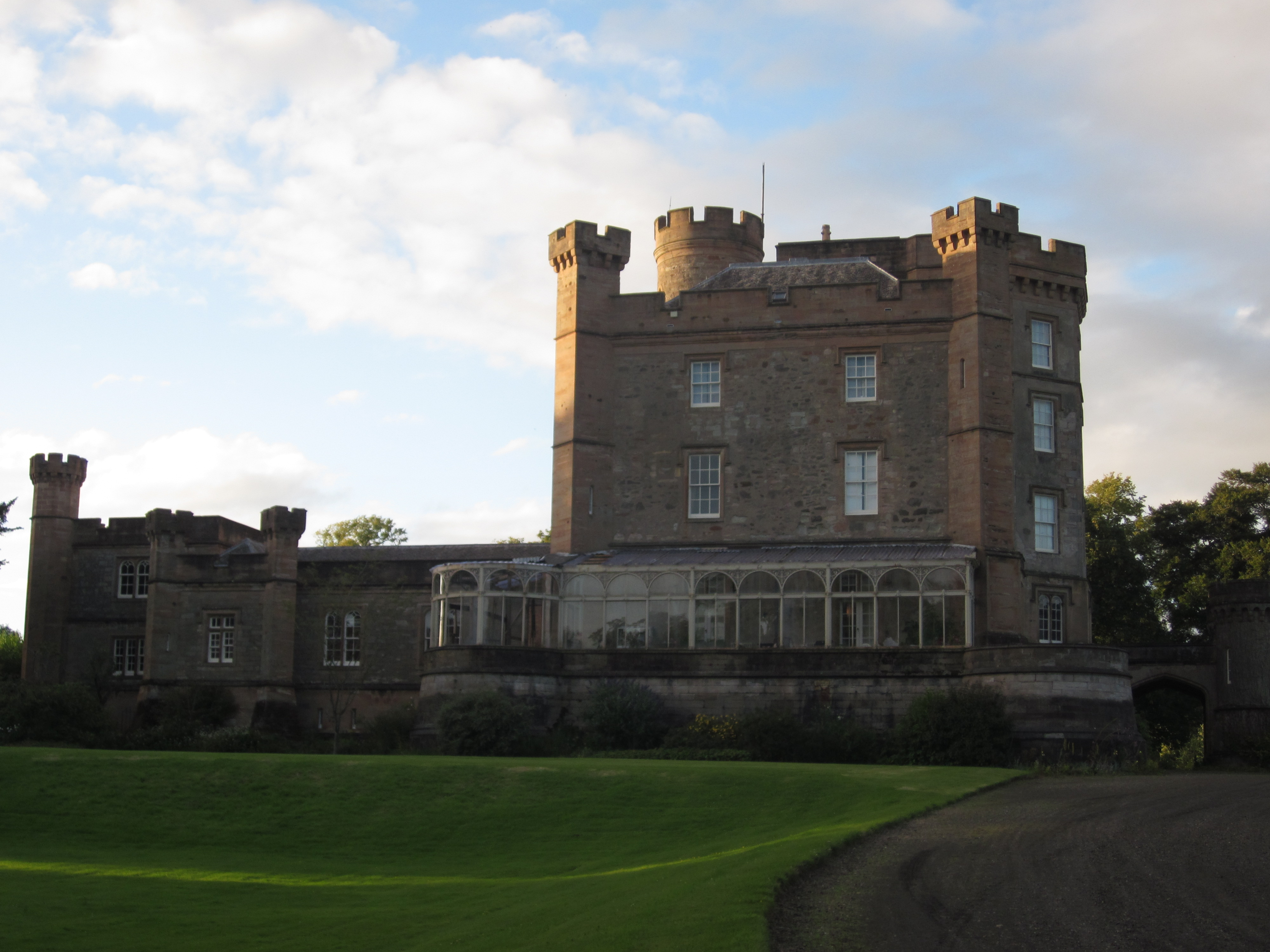
Caprington Castle.

Caprington Castle is a 15th century keep, incorporated in a castellated mansion, about 2 miles (3.2 km) south west of Kilmarnock, East Ayrshire, Scotland, south of the River Irvine.

The castle is still occupied.

== History ==
The Wallaces of Sundrum owned the property from 1385, but it passed by marriage to the Cunninghams in 1400. The Cunninghams were members of the Baronetage of Nova Scotia between 1669 and 1829. The castle was included in the refurbished mansion in about 1829.

== Structure ==
The original castle had a massive keep with a small stair-wing and a larger wing built later.

The walls of the current dining-room correspond to the original keep.

The principal façade is now dominated by a four-storey centre tower, which has a parapet and machicolations. There are square-headed drip moulds. Corner turrets are square; there is a porte-cochere; the building stands on a terrace, with round corner bastions. The internal hall and staircase have plaster ceilings and other Gothic decoration. The owners possess drawings of the castle prior to the modernisation.

It is a category A listed building and the grounds are included in the Inventory of Gardens and Designed Landscapes in Scotland.

== See also ==
- Blacksyke Tower
- Caprington Loch
- Earlston, East Ayrshire
