= John Kelso Hunter =

Scottish portrait artist (1802–1873)

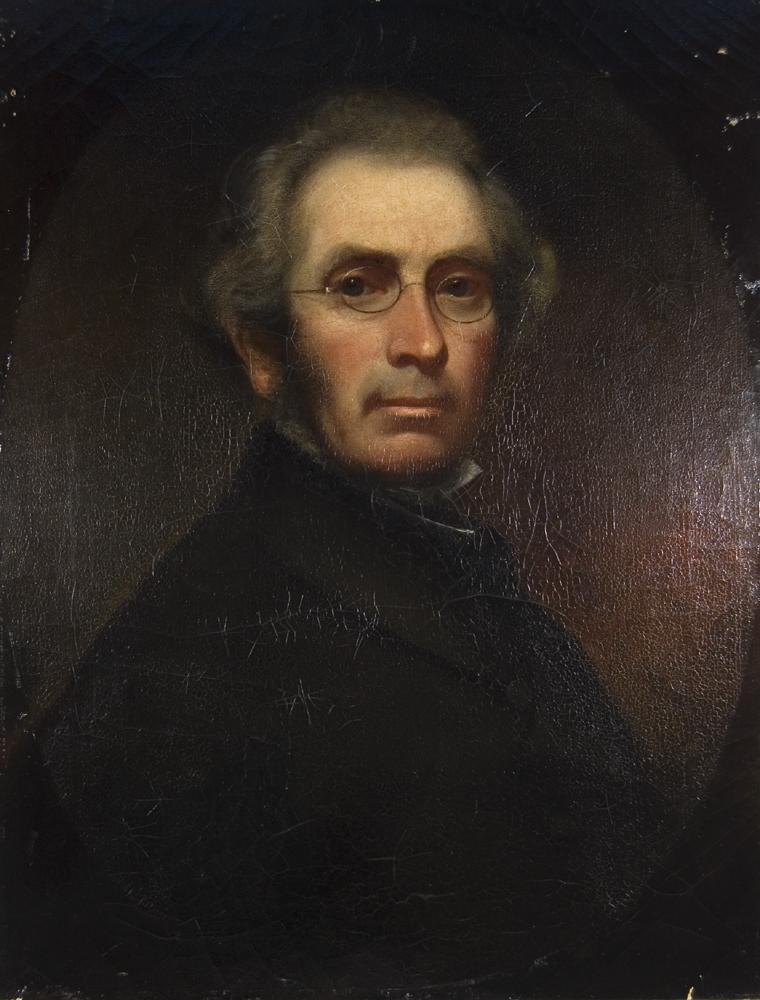
Self Portrait, 1858

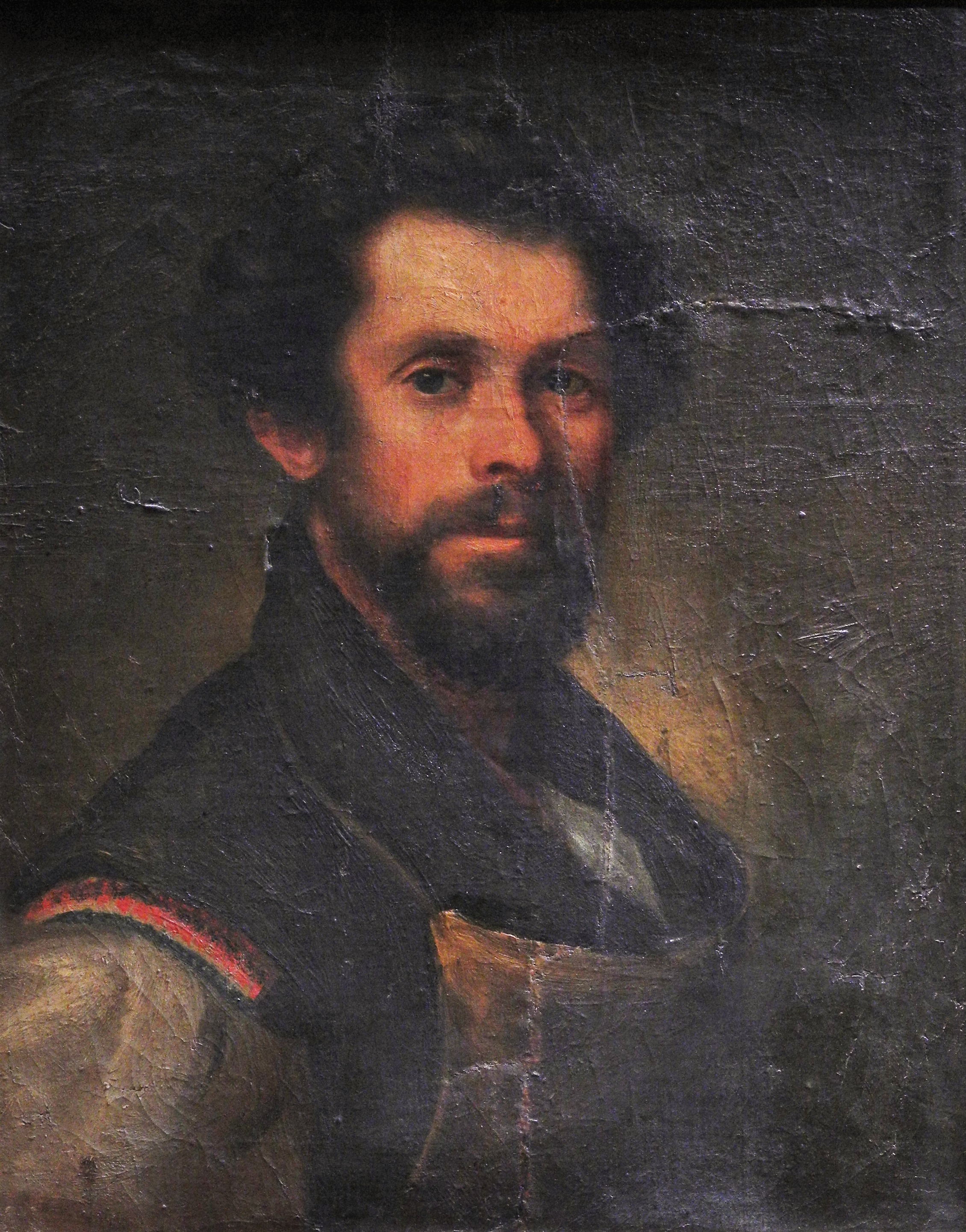
The Cobbler to his Last, JKHunter, 1849.

John Kelso Hunter (15 December 1802 – 3 February 1873) was a Scottish portrait artist, 'Boot and Shoemaker' and author of two books; Retrospect of an Artist's Life: Memorials of West Country Men and Manners of the Past Half Century; Life Studies of Character (1870, various Publishers.)

== Memorials of Character ==
Hunter was one of four children born to George Hunter and Isabella Logan; he had an elder brother George 'Geordie' (born: 14/10/1801,) a younger sister Susannah (born: 27/10/1805); as well as his wee brother, Davie. There is some suggestion that his sister died as he writes "my older brother and I represent the family now."

John was born at Dankeith, Ayrshire. His father was a gardener on the estate owned by Lieutenant-Colonel William Kelso, he died when Hunter was 8 years old. The Hunters came from Churnside and would have lived near the philosopher David Hume, before George migrated to the West Coast.

As a young child, Hunter was employed as a herd-boy on the Kelsos' estate, and he was then apprenticed to a shoemaker. When his indentures expired, he settled at Kilmarnock. He taught himself portrait painting while continuing his work as a shoemaker.

Hunter moved to Glasgow, where he was employed alternately as an artist and a shoemaker. In 1847 he exhibited a portrait of himself as a cobbler at the Royal Academy, London; it was the only piece of his to be displayed there. He exhibited his painting "A Man's Head" at the Annual Exhibitions of the Royal Scottish Academy in 1849. After 9 years, he gave the Academy his formal self-portrait piece. He contributed three other works, "A Roadside Inn, Ayr" in 1868 and "From Above Port-Glasgow" and "Self Portrait as a Shoemaker" in 1872.

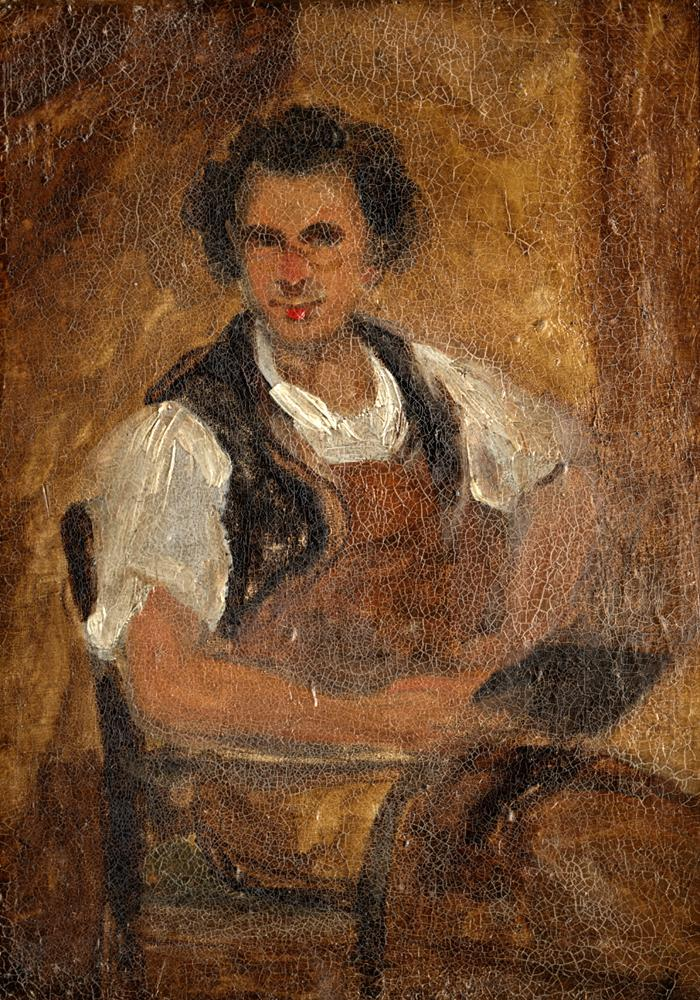
Self Portrait as a Shoemaker, 1847

During 1861 and 1873, Hunter exhibited seven paintings at the Royal Glasgow Institute of Fine Arts:

- 1861 - 'Self Portrait'
- 1862 - 'Dreghorn, Ayrshire'
- 1871 - 'The Reader'
- 1872 - 'Loch Lomond, from Mount Misery' and 'Gourock - looking up the Clyde'
- 1873 - 'Self Portrait as a Shoemaker' and 'From Above Port-Glasgow'

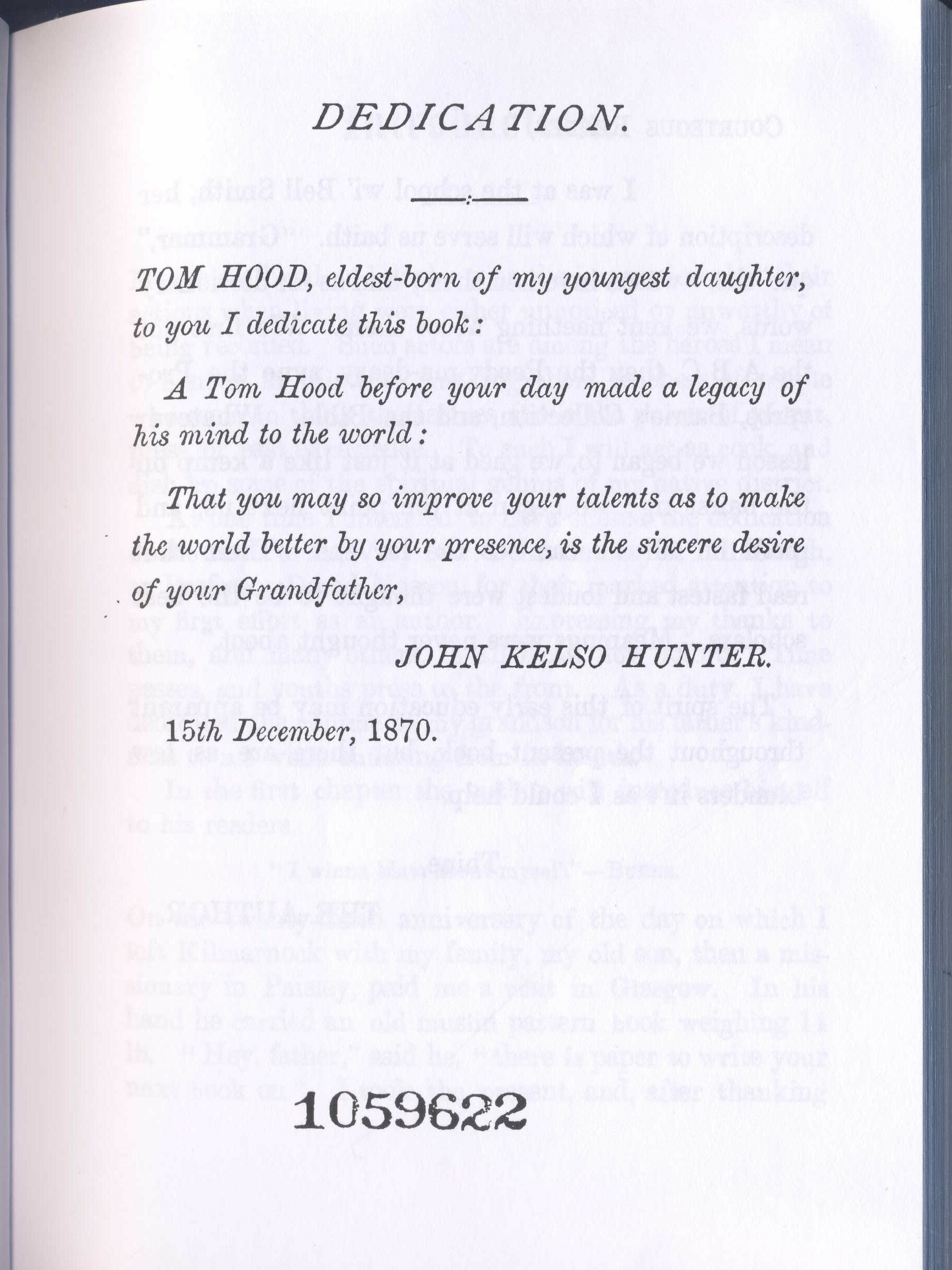
Dedication of Life Studies of Character (Pollock, 1871)

In 1868 he published his first book, The Retrospect of an Artist's Life, subtitled Memorials of West-Country Men and Manners of the Past Half Century. Acquainted in his youth with many who had known Robert Burns, and with some of the heroes of the poet's verse, Hunter embodied these recollections in a volume entitled Life Studies of Character, printed in 1870.

== Tarbolton Lodge, the ==
The book throws much light on the works of Burns, especially on the origins of 'Death and Dr. Hornbrook,' and faithfully describes the society into which the poet was born. Hunter writes that Robyn Burns made the "gowd o' folk."

Valuable notices are supplied of the song writer, Tannahill, and other minor poets of the north; every chapter is prefaced by a quote of verse, or other axiom.

== Family ==
On 9 August 1822 Hunter married Agnes Willock in Low Church, Kilmarnock. The couple had 13 children over a period of 22 years. John Kelso remarried after Agnes died in 1861. On 1 September 1862, John Kelso married Elizabeth Bain in Tradeston, Glasgow:

I have parted with a wife and eight of my family, and have a wife and seven children alive at this date.

Should any one think that I am inexperienced in family matters, when has faced so much he will be apt to change his mind.

JK.- Roal, 1867

Children with Nanny:

1. William Hunter - Birth: 26 January 1823 (Kilmarnock, Scotland) Death: Unknown
2. Isabella Hunter - Birth: 14 April 1824 (Kilmarnock, Scotland) Death: 29 December 1836 (Kilmarnock, Scotland)
3. John Kelso Hunter - Birth: 4 June 1826 (Kilmarnock, Scotland) Death: 2 March 1858 (Glasgow, Scotland)
4. Helen Hunter - Birth: 29 December 1827 (Kilmarnock, Scotland) Death: Unknown
5. George Hunter - Birth: 9 June 1828 (Kilmarnock, Scotland) Death: 12 May 1838 (Kilmarnock, Scotland)
6. Anne Hunter - Birth: 22 November 1830 (Kilmarnock, Scotland) Death: 1898 (Beechworth, Victoria, Australia)
7. David Hunter - Birth: 19 May 1832 (Kilmarnock, Scotland) Death: Unknown
8. James Hunter - Birth: 21 January 1834 (Kilmarnock, Scotland) Death: 7 June 1841 (Kilmarnock, Scotland)
9. Agnes Hunter - Birth: 28 November 1835 (Kilmarnock, Scotland) Death: 18 April 1837 (Kilmarnock, Scotland)
10. Isabella Hunter - Birth: 8 December 1838 (Kilmarnock, Scotland) Death: Unknown
11. George Hunter - Birth: 9 September 1840 (Glasgow, Scotland) Death: Unknown
12. Willie Hunter - Death: Sudden infant Death 1873

Hunter's son John Kelso Jr was employed as a teacher and died at 33, Hunter wrote 'he fell into bad health'. He also wrote that his son's wife died shortly after him and his three sons were left to their maternal grandmother.

Isabella Hunter married Andrew Bryce on the fifth June 1857 at Eglinton st 'according to the establish Church of Scotland.' The street has since been named Queen st.

== See also ==
- Caprington Loch
