= Charlotte Dundas =

World's second successful steamboat

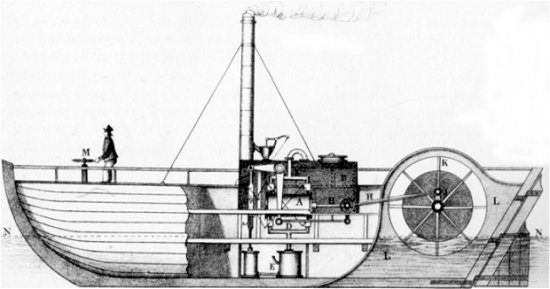
- Charlotte Dundas cut-away drawing by Robert Bowie

History

United Kingdom
- Name: Charlotte Dundas
- Namesake: Lady Charlotte Dundas (daughter of Lord Dundas)
- Owner: Lord Dundas
- Builder: John Allan
- Maiden voyage: 4 January 1803
- Fate: Broken up, 1861
- Notes: Designed by William Symington (1764–1831) Model of Charlotte Dundas kept in Victoria Museum, Melbourne, Australia

General characteristics
- Type: Paddle steamer
- Length: 56 ft (17 m)
- Beam: 18 ft (5.5 m)
- Depth of hold: 8 ft (2.4 m)
- Propulsion: Carron Company steam engine; Single central paddle wheel
- Speed: 2 mph (3.2 km/h)

Charlotte Dundas is regarded as the world's second successful steamboat, the first towing steamboat and the boat that demonstrated the practicality of steam power for ships.

== Early experiments ==
Development of experimental steam engined paddle boats by William Symington had halted when the sponsor, Patrick Miller of Dalswinton, abandoned the project. Symington had continued building steam pumping engines and mill engines. In 1793 he had developed a drive using a pivoted crosshead beam above the vertical cylinder to transmit power to a crank.

Miller's project and Captain John Schank's unsuccessful attempt at a canal steam tug had come to the attention of Thomas, Lord Dundas, Governor of the Forth and Clyde Canal Company, and at a meeting of the canal company's directors on 5 June 1800 approved his proposals on the basis of "a model of a boat by Captain Schank to be worked by a steam engine by Mr Symington".

The boat was built by Alexander Hart at Grangemouth to Symington's design with a vertical cylinder engine and crosshead transmitting power to a crank driving the paddlewheels. Trials on the River Carron in June 1801 were successful. This first boat may have been named Charlotte Dundas and the trials apparently included towing sloops from the river Forth up the Carron and thence along the Forth and Clyde Canal. There was concern about wave damage to the canal banks, and possibly the boat was found to be underpowered on the canal, so the canal company refused further trials.

== Charlotte Dundas ==
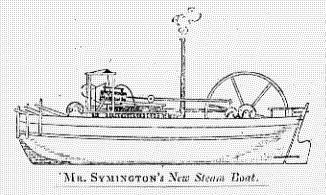
Charlotte Dundas, drawing by William Symington

In 1801 Symington patented a horizontal steam engine directly linked to a crank, and got the support of Lord Dundas for a second steamboat which would become famous as Charlotte Dundas, named in honour of his Lordship's daughter.

=== Construction ===
Symington designed a new hull around his powerful horizontal engine, with the crank driving a large paddle wheel in a central upstand in the hull, aimed at avoiding damage to the canal banks. The new boat was 56 ft (17.1 m) long, 18 ft (5.5 m) wide and 8 ft (2.4 m) depth, with a wooden hull. After a model of the boat was made and shown to Lord Dundas, the boat was built by John Allan, and the engine by the Carron Company.

=== First sailing ===
The first sailing was on the canal in Glasgow on 4 January 1803, with Lord Dundas and a few of his relatives and friends on board. After some improvements, in March 1803 Charlotte Dundas towed two 70-ton barges 30 km (19 mi) along the Forth and Clyde Canal to Glasgow, and despite "a strong breeze right ahead" which stopped all other canal boats it took only nine and a quarter hours, giving an average speed of about 3 kilometres per hour (1.9 mph). This demonstrated the practicality of steam power for towing boats.

=== End of the project ===
Plans to introduce boats on the Forth and Clyde canal were thwarted, largely by fears of erosion of the banks, and a project to build tug boats for the Bridgewater Canal had ended with the Duke of Bridgewater's death a few days before the March trial. Charlotte Dundas was left in a backwater of the canal at Bainsford until it was broken up in 1861. Symington was not paid all he had invested in construction of Charlotte Dundas and was left disappointed, but the development of steamboats was continued by others including Robert Fulton in the United States and Henry Bell in Scotland.

== See also ==
- Steamboat
- Paddle steamer

== Sources ==
- B.E.G. Clark, Symington and the Steamboat ISBN 978-1-4457-4936-5 (Amazon)
- B.E.G. Clark, Steamboat Evolution; A Short History ISBN 978-1-84753-201-5 (Amazon)
