= Earlston, East Ayrshire =

Coordinates: 55.5862°N 4.5305°W

Earlston: Scots: Earleton
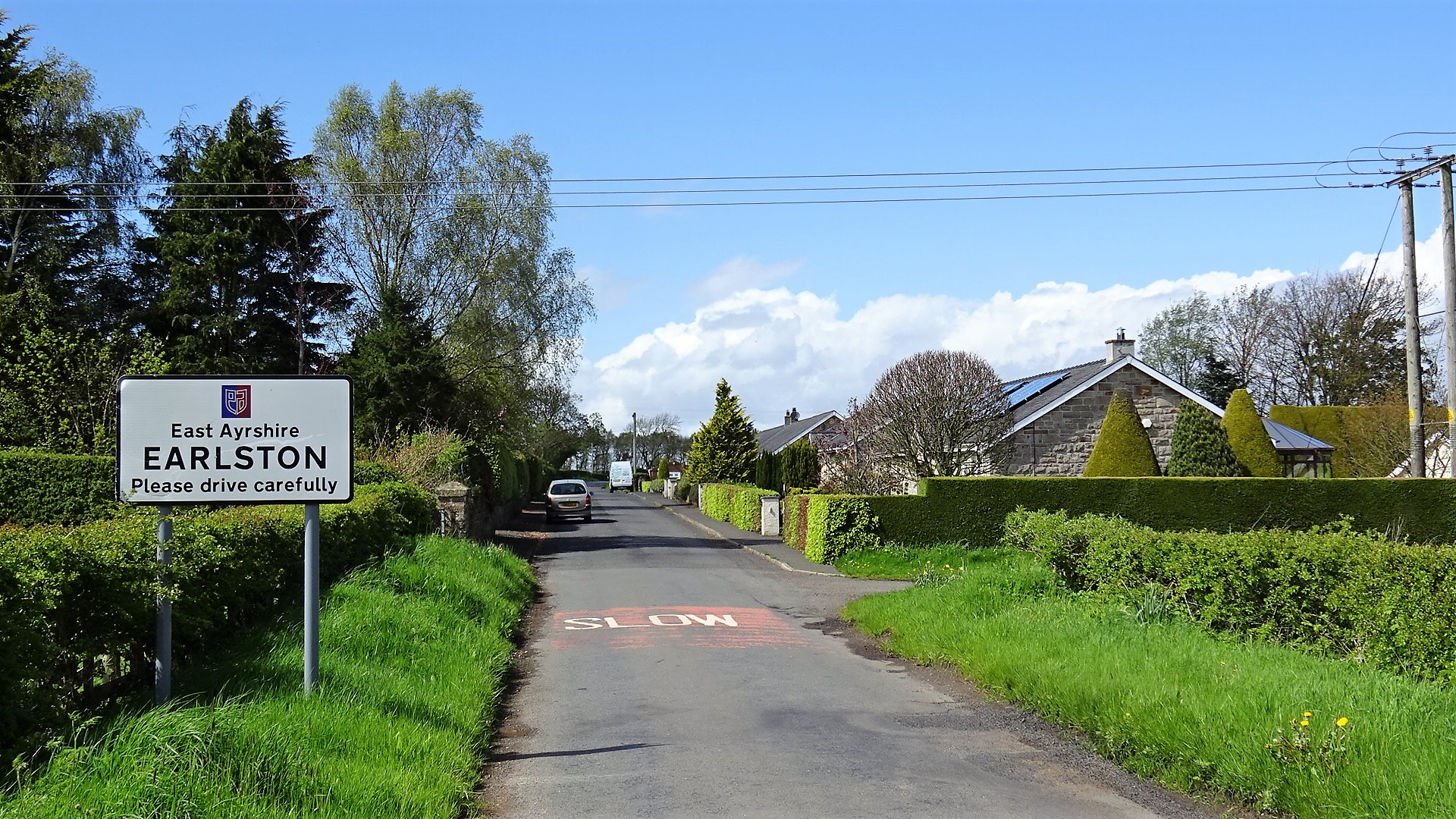
- Earlston hamlet

- Location within East Ayrshire
- OS grid reference: NS 4060 3541
- Council area: East Ayrshire
- Lieutenancy area: Ayrshire and Arran
- Country: Scotland
- Sovereign state: United Kingdom
- Police: Scotland
- Fire: Scottish
- Ambulance: Scottish

Earlston is a hamlet in Riccarton, East Ayrshire, Scotland. The habitation dates from at least the early 18th century and is near Caprington Castle and Todrigs Mill. It was for many years the site of a large sawmill and a mine pumping engine, and had sidings of the Glasgow and South-Western Railway's Fairlie Branch.

== History ==
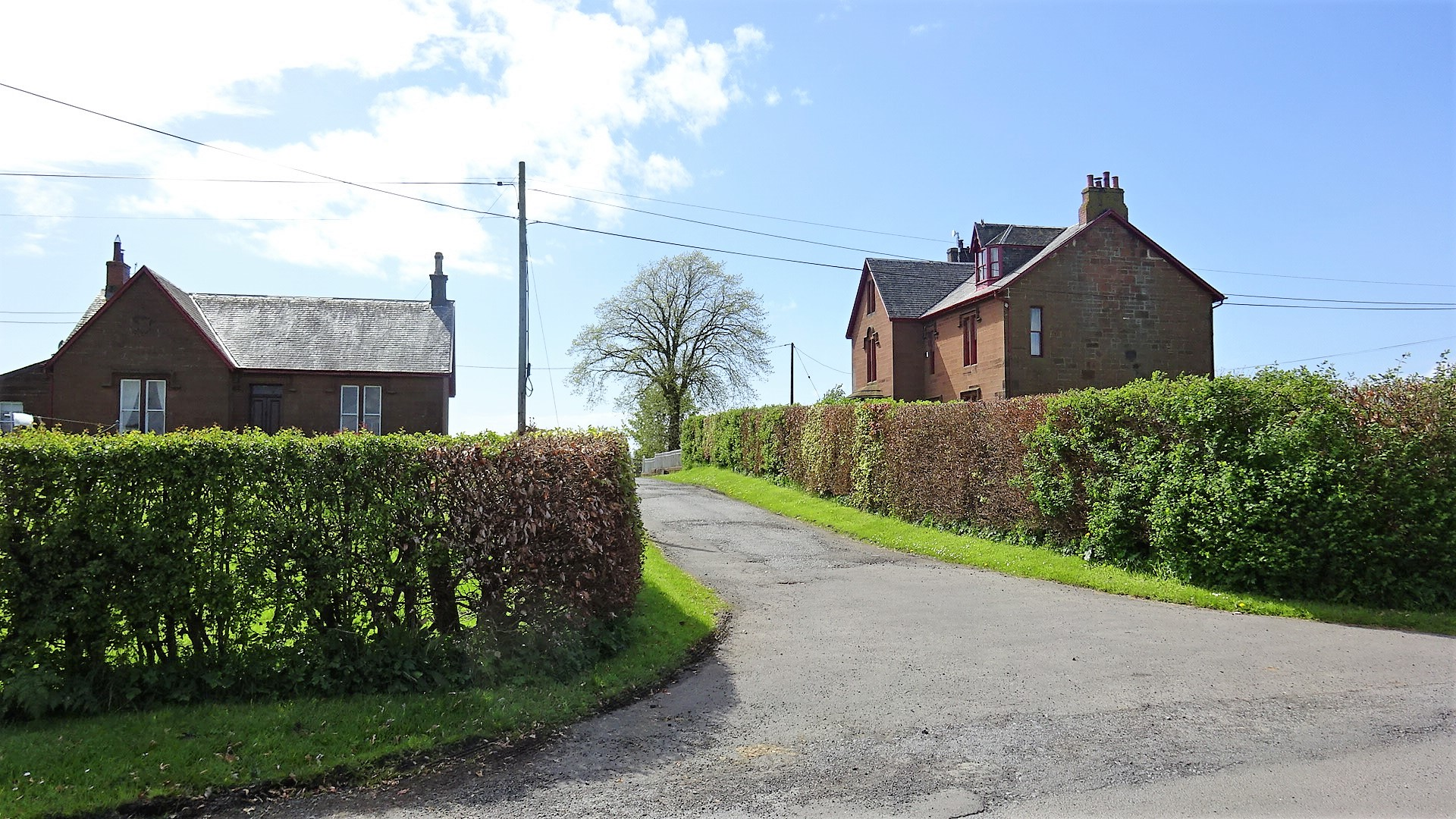
The lane to Todrigs Farm or kennels off Earlston's mainstreet. Old factor's house on the right.

The present day name suggest a link with an earldom such as that of Dundonald or Glencairn, the latter holding the Barony of Caprington until 1683, however in the mid 18th century the spelling is recorded as 'Earle town' and in Scots this can also refer to a person who is hired "To engage for service by payment of a sum" and the expression 'earle-penny' was a "A coin given as a token of engagement of service." Earlston may have been a place where dwellings were provided for Caprington estate workers, many of whom were hired annually at the Dudsday, also Duds' day, or Dud's day hiring fair, a holiday, held at Kilmarnock, originally held at Martinmas that falls on November 11. At this fair farm servants etc would be hired. The name comes from the custom of farm Labourers purchasing new clothes or 'Duds' having been paid their wages for the previous half-year.

Caprington had been held by the Wallace's of Craigie Castle however it passed into the hands of the Cuninghames who held the barony as baronets from 1669 to 1829 when the line became extinct and John Smith assumed the name Cuninghame on behalf of his wife who had inherited the estate.

The hamlet was once the location of the Eglinton Hunt kennels located at the old Todrigs Farm. A fine Ballochmyle red sandstone building was constructed for the factor of the Caprington Estate in 1873. Todrigs Farm was the birthplace of Johnnie Walker of the Johnnie Walker whisky fame. It was sold to finance the purchase of the family's first grocer shop.

The old road from Ayr to Kilmarnock and Glasgow ran quite close by so the site was not as isolated as it is today.

A corn mill, later a thrashing mill used to thrash grain, separating the cereal's seeds from the husk and stalks by a beating action that made all the seeds drop out. Located on the Todrigs Burn it was located to the north of the hamlet with a mill pond standing close to Todrigs Farm however this has been infilled. A large irregular shaped curling pond was located at West Todrigs Farm, west of the farm house and shown in 1897 and 1908 served by the Todrigs Burn is all that survives of the old Caprington Loch (datum 2018). The Todrigs Burn rises in the Coodham area and is also fed by the Slough Burn that rises in the Dankeith Estate.

Earlston lies in a low lying area at 35m above sea level. The 1892 - 1913 OS map shows a new group of four semi-detached houses on the north side of the road facing the older houses that are arranged below the sawmill complex.

A school may not have existed in Earlston however a school and /or Sunday School was located in the 19th century attached to the likely farm building located next to the Blacksyke Tower.

=== Sawmill and railways ===
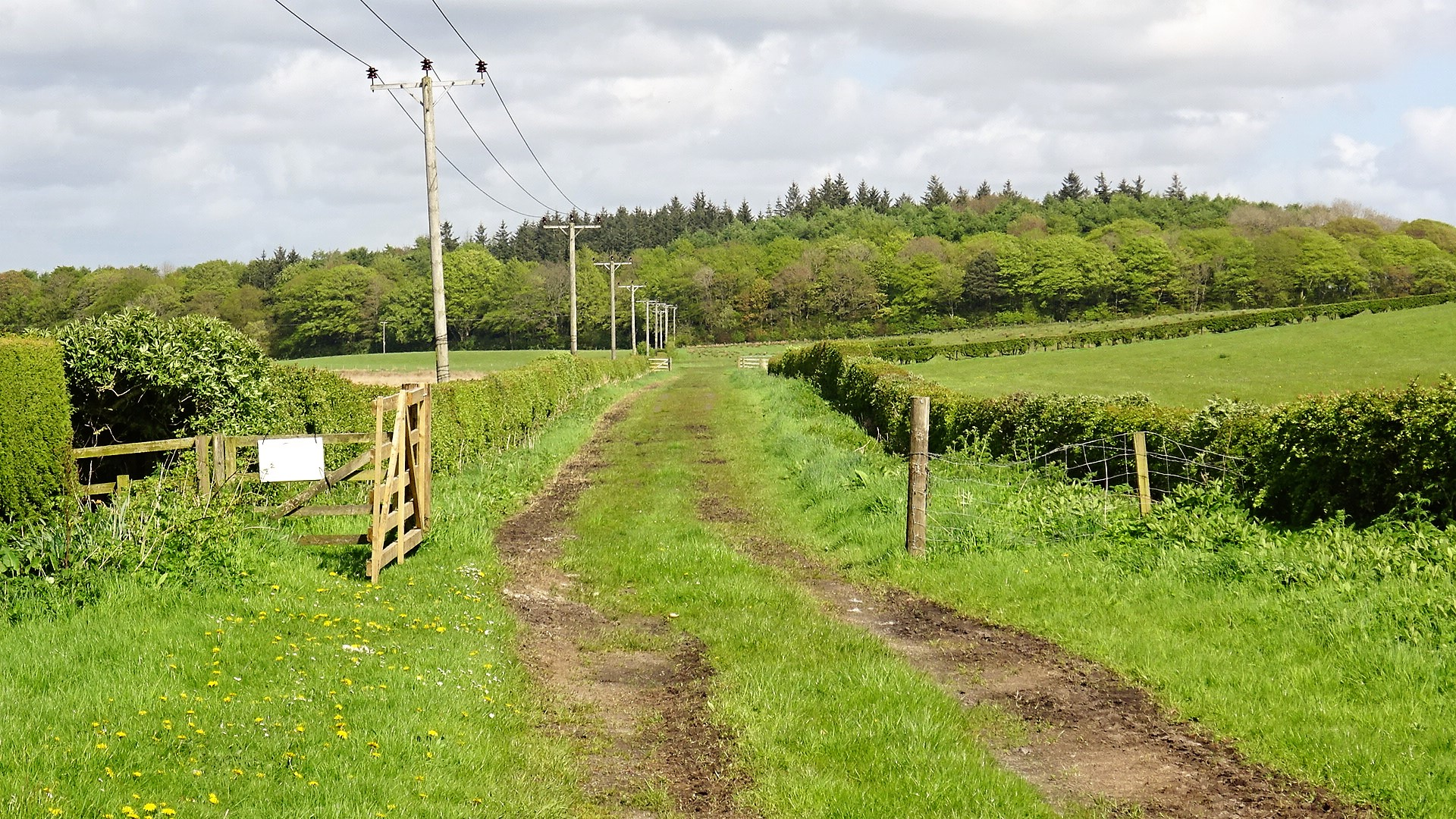
A view along the old railway trackbed towards Blacksyke Tower on the Caprington Golf Course.

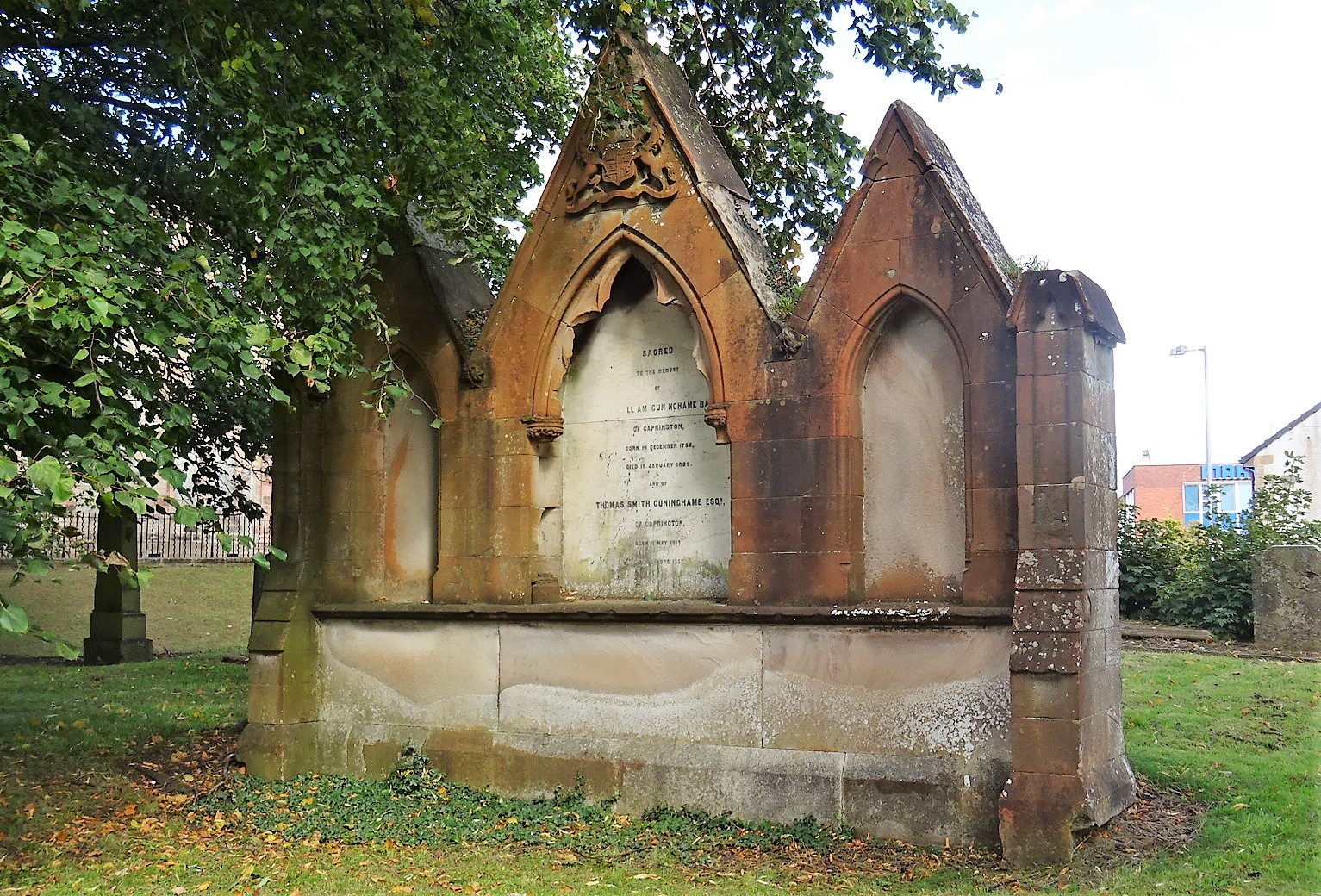
Memorial to the Cuninghame's of Caprington Castle at Riccarton churchyard.

In 1857 the branch to the Caprington Colliery No.40 pit had yet to be built. A building to the east of the railway at the junction to the sawmill is suggestive of a signal box but is later marked as a water meter. The railway continued towards Blacksyke Tower and to several other pits in the area at this time, the line being standard gauge and worked by locomotives by this date.

In the 1855-57 Name Book of the Ordnance Survey the Earlston Cottages and workshop are recorded as being the property of Thomas Smith Cuninghame Esq. of Caprington Castle.

In 1895 the sawmill was a complex of buildings with a network of railway sidings. A series of buildings ran parallel to the railway nearly as far as the road and internally several buildings were present, one with a siding running into it. The sidings may have also brought coal for use by the pumping engine as rails ran close to the site of this building.

The 1892 - 1913 OS map shows several sidings running into the sawmill, a passing loop, a branch running down to the Caprington Colliery No.40 pit and two sidings running into an old pit site that may have been for disposal of coal waste. A short head shunt ran across the road on the trackbed of the old mineral line to Blacksyke, Loreny, etc.

By 1908 the railway had been truncated and no longer ran across the level crossing at the road and the passing loop had become sidings. The network within the sawmill had been simplified and the building opposite the sawmill junction is marked as a water meter. Caprington Colliery Np.40 pit is shown as disused with the line lifted and a new Caprington Colliery No.42 pit with a railway link is shown.

By 1926 the sawmill is no longer marked and Todrigs is shown as being the site of kennels. The railway at this point runs only as far as the old sawmill and no collieries or their branches remain. In 1955 the railways had all been lifted. By 2018 the sawmill buildings had mostly been demolished.

=== Mining ===
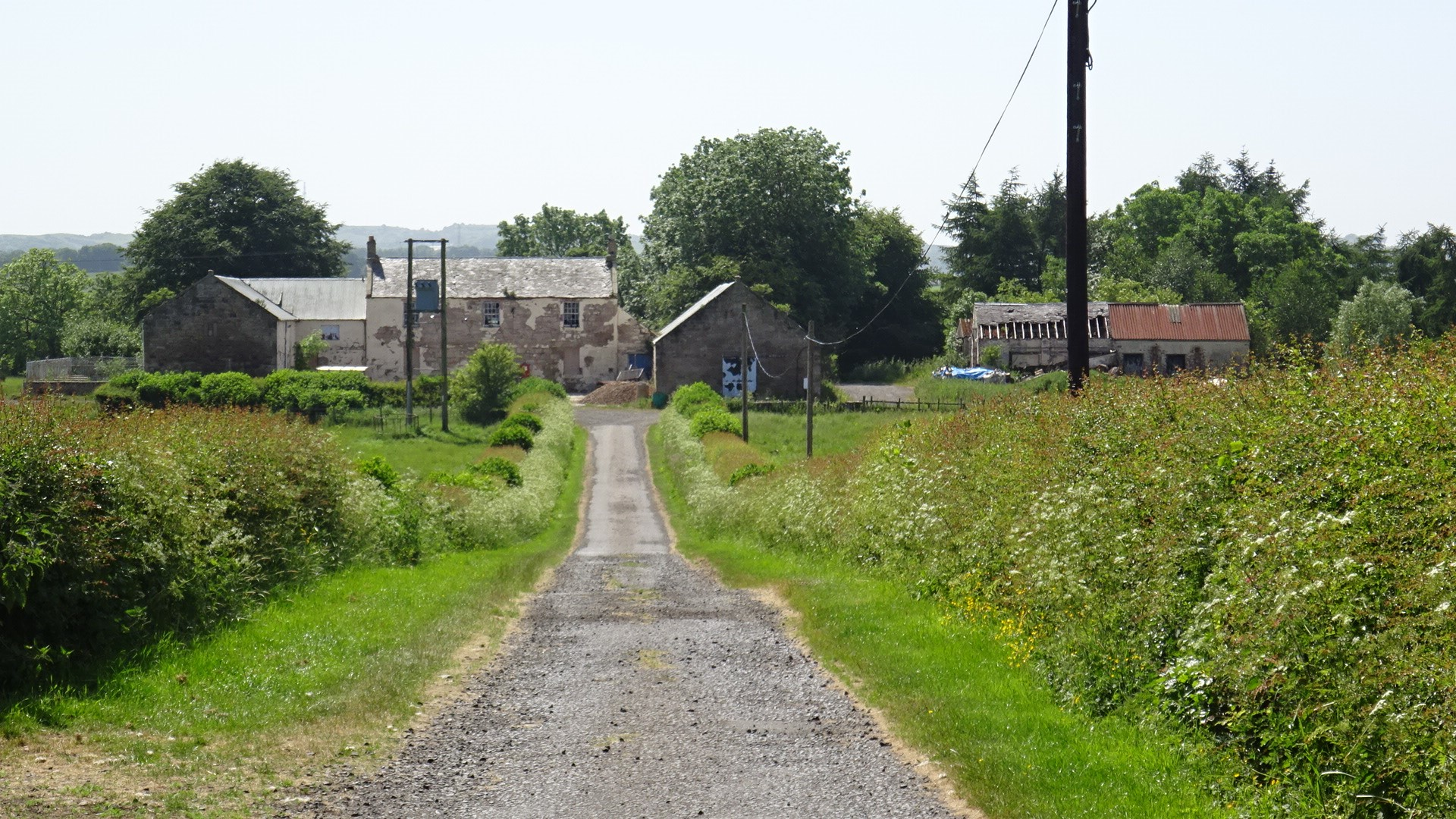
Todrigs Farm or 'The Kennels'.

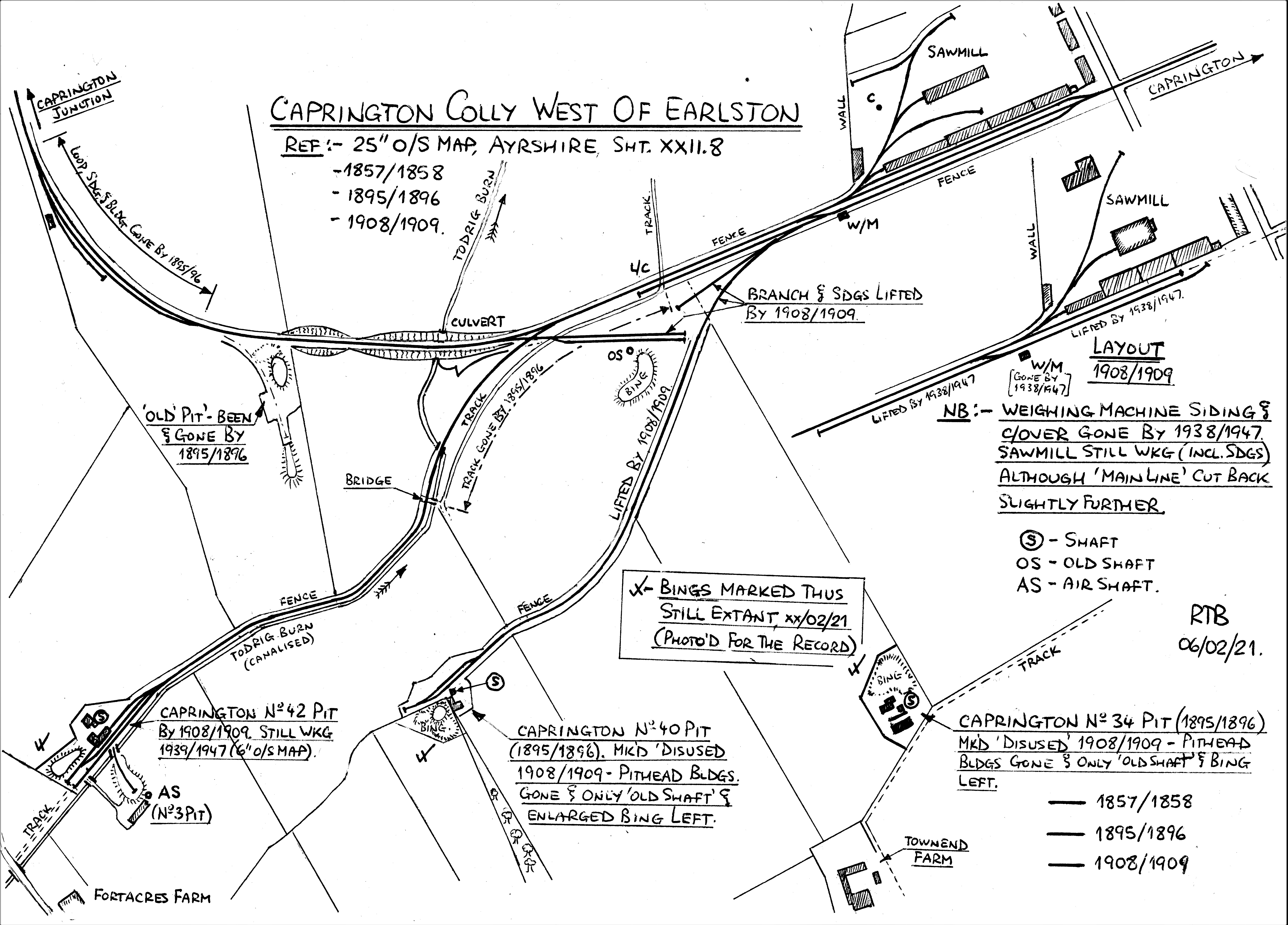
Plan of line and pits at Caprington by Robert Blane

No colliery pits were in the hamlet, however the 1908 OS map shows the location of two shafts close to a square raised water tank that represents the site of the 1770s Caprington Newcomen atmospheric pumping engine that helped drain the coalfield. The location of the site from which the 1770s Newcomen Atmospheric Beam engine now housed in the National Museum of Scotland originally came was the 'Caprington Colliery' with its numerous pits and the pumping engine located in Earlston, an old photograph shows its appearance at the time. This engine was donated by Colonel Cuninghame of Caprington to the town of Kilmarnock in 1901 after it had worked for 95 years and after some restoration work by Glenfield and Kennedy it was housed in the Dick Institute in Kilmarnock for many years until it was considered unsafe and donated to the National Museum of Scotland in 1958. In 1998 it was restored and placed on display with a partial replica engine house and powered by electricity (see videos).

The engine had its wooden beam replaced by a cast-iron one in 1837 and the 96 inch long cast iron cylinder had a 30-inch bore and a stroke of 54 to 60 inches. It is not clear where the water was pumped to for disposal as no streams are shown in the immediate area, however a square and embanked tank once stood near by.

No traditional miners' row existed at Earlston however given the number of pits and collieries in the area it is likely that some were resident in the hamlet.

== See also ==
- Caprington Loch
