= Caprington Loch =

Coordinates: 55°35′04″N 4°32′09″W

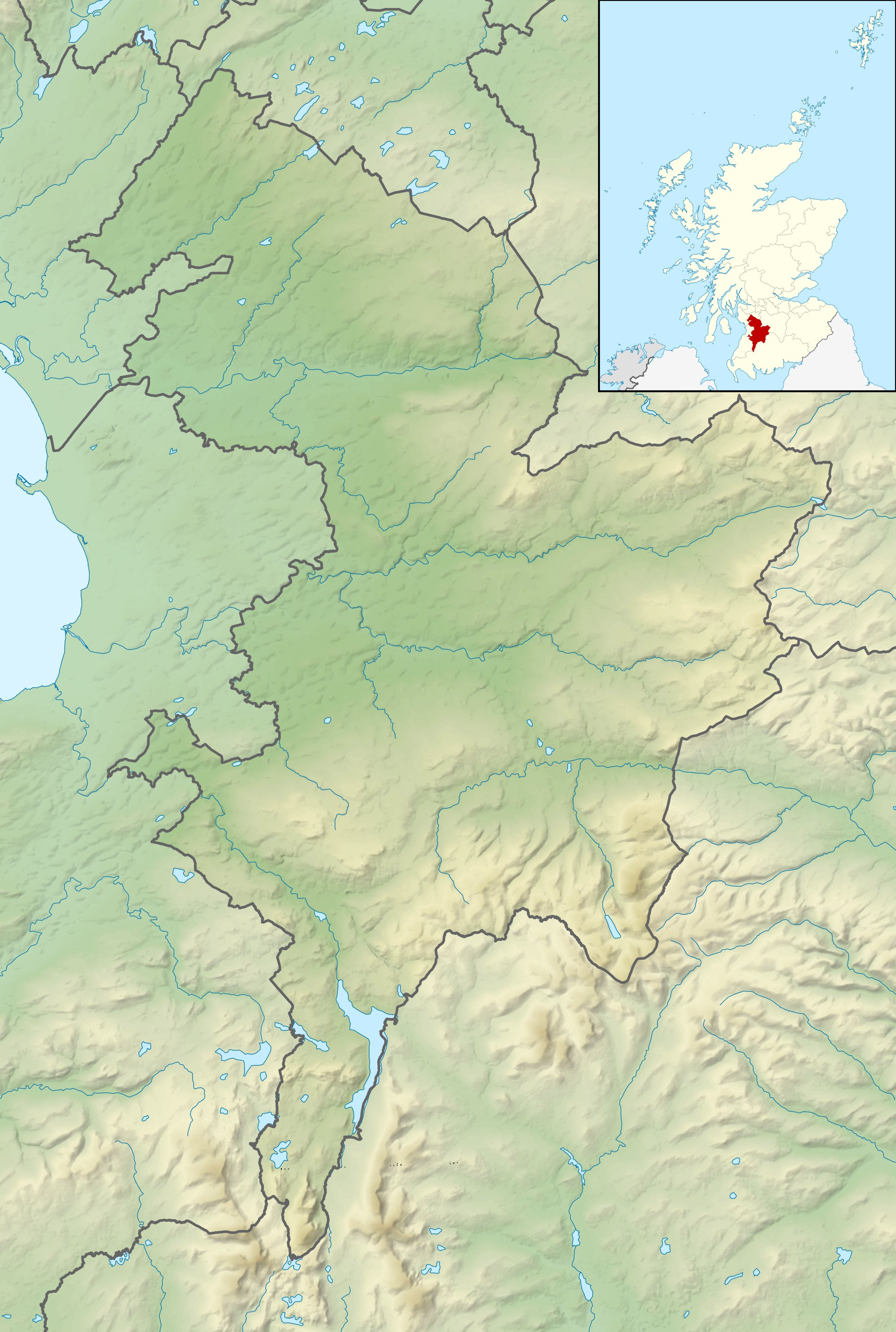
- Location within East Ayrshire
- Location: Earlston, East Ayrshire, Scotland
- Type: Freshwater loch
- Primary inflows: Slough & Todrigs Burn, Rainwater & surface drainage
- Primary outflows: Todrigs Burn
- Catchment area: Coodham and Dankeith
- Basin countries: Scotland
- Surface area: 0.749 acres (0.303 ha)
- Islands: None
- Settlements: Kilmarnock

What now survives of the old Caprington Loch (NS402352) is situated near Earlston, Riccarton, East Ayrshire, Scotland. The loch was a natural feature, sitting in a hollow on the old Caprington Castle estate. The loch waters drain via the Todrigs Burn that flows into the River Irvine to the east of Gatehead village. It was partly drained, probably sometime after the 1820s, as were so many other lochs, as part of 18th and 19th centuries extensive agricultural improvements and the only area of open water that remains does so as it was once used as a curling pond for the Caprington Castle Estate owners and their employees or tenants.

== History ==
=== Place names ===
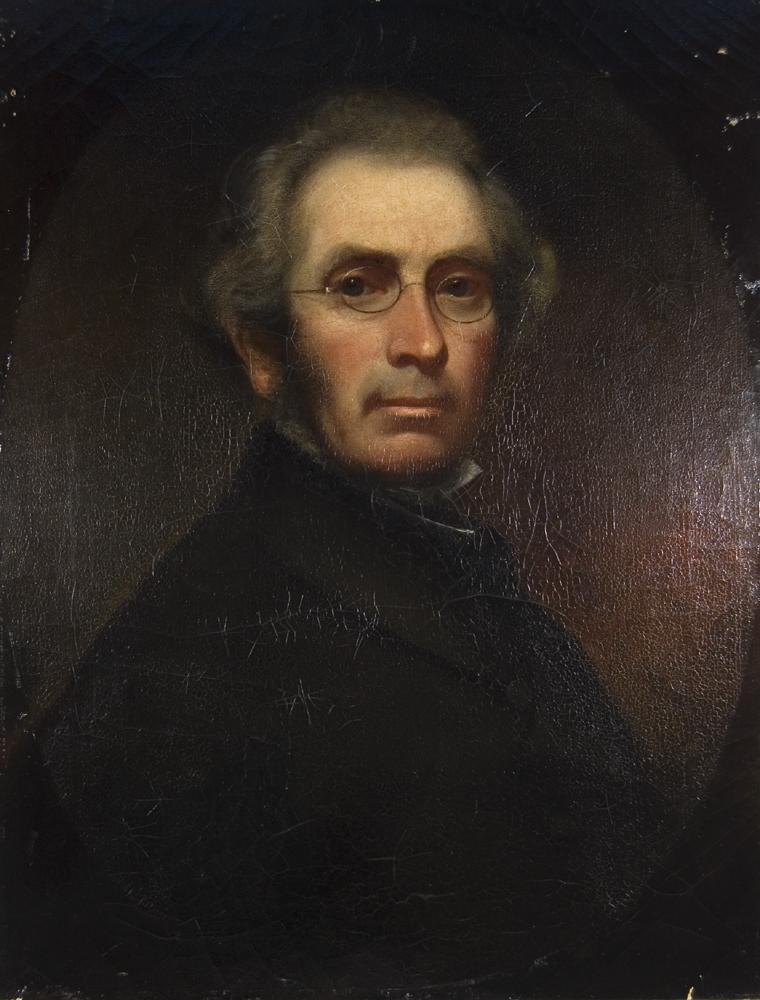
John Kelso Hunter visited and described the loch in the 1820s.

A habitation named 'Lochside' is recorded in 1775 and again in 1821 to the east of the loch not far from the old Treesbank House and estate, but is no longer present or its old location known. Tod-holes, tod-strips, tod-rigs were places frequented by foxes.

The original 'Tothiricks' (sic) farm was located near Peatland, to the north of Caprington Loch.

=== Caprington Loch ===
William Roy's map of 1747-55 does not show the loch however two mills are shown, one possibly a windmill. In 1775 the loch is shown with a 'Tode' habitation marked near to Caprington Castle. West Todrigs Farm may well incorporate this place name element. Todrigs Farm was the birthplace of Johnnie Walker of the Johnnie Walker whisky fame. It was sold to finance the purchase of the family's first grocer shop.

In 1821 a sizeable loch is shown with the farm of Templeton to the south and a single burn running down from the Dankeith estate. As stated the remnants of the loch are located near Earlston close to the old West Todrigs Farm that was used for many years as the Eglinton Hunt Kennels. The loch was mainly fed by the Todrigs Burn which arises on the old Coodham Estate and by the Slough Burn that arises in the Dankeith estate.

In around 1820 the Dankeith born artist John Kelso Hunter (15 December 1802 – 3 February 1873) records a visit to Caprington Loch in his biography, writing: "Passing Caprington Loch I made the first artistic halt, took my position on the margin of the lake with my face toward Kilbirnie Hills. Their azure purity was mirrored in the still water. Towards the front of the picture a stunted hedge and part of a dilapidated paling ran into the lake, out of which sprang up a bold old saugh tree. Its graceful form was massively mirrored in the crystalline liquid. There I stood, as much inspired as ever artist was."

Location of Caprington Loch, East Ayrshire

Caprington Castle and estate had been held by the Wallace's of Craigie Castle however it passed into the hands of the Cunninghames who held the barony as baronets from 1669 to 1829 when the line became extinct and John Smith assumed the name Cunninghame on behalf of his wife who had inherited the estate.

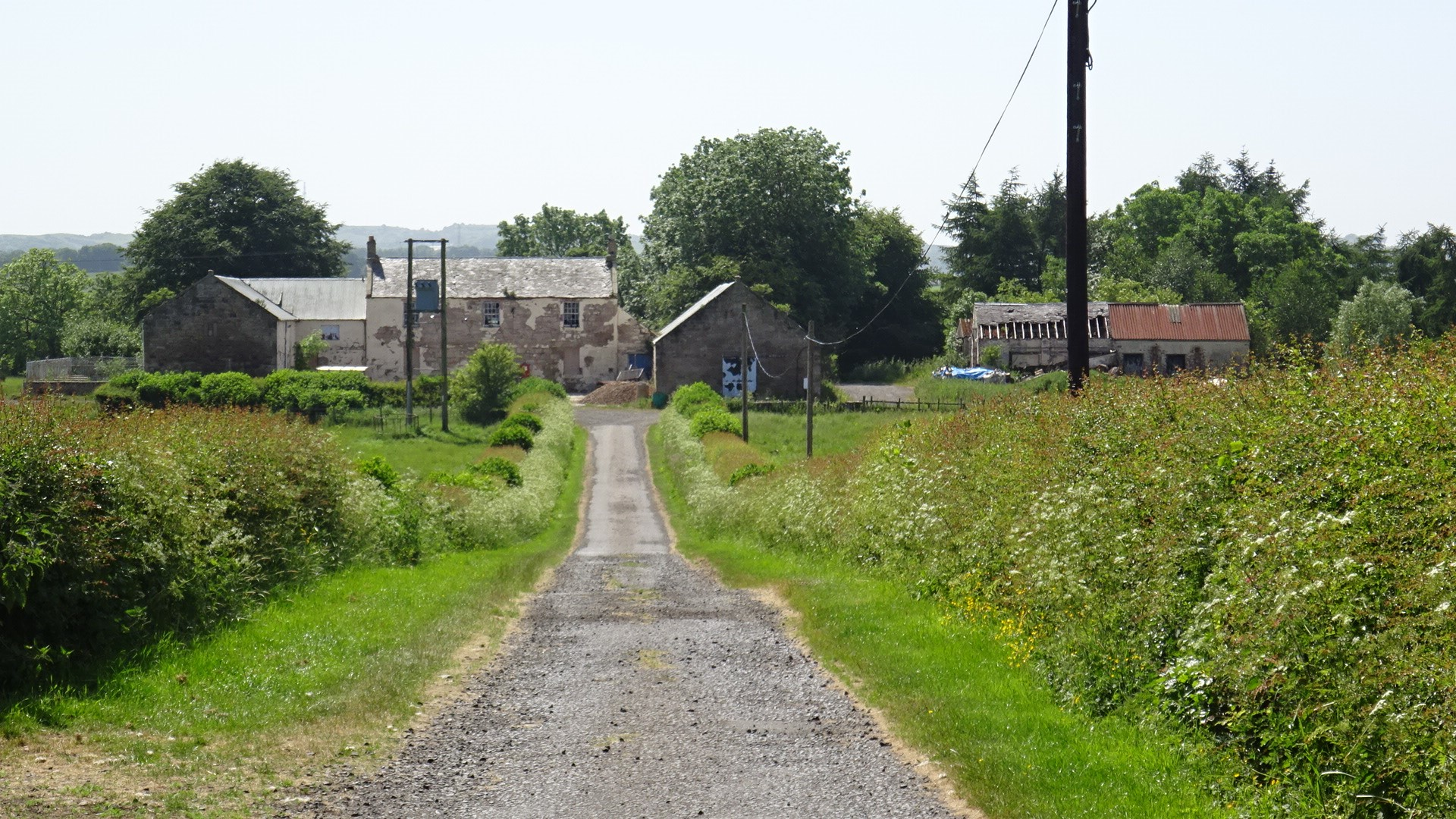
West Todrigs Farm or 'The Eglinton Kennels'.

Todrigs was a corn mill and later a thrashing mill that stood on the Todrigs Burn to the north of the Earlston hamlet with a head of water supplied by a mill pod located close to West Todrigs Farm that has been infilled. The curling pond at West Todrigs Farm was a little unusual in being an irregular shape as it was the lowest lying part of the old loch and sits close to the farm house. It is shown in 1897 and 1908 was served by the Todrigs Burn that either fed the mill pond or ran past the mill via a separate lade.

The old road from Ayr to Kilmarnock and Glasgow ran quite close by so the site was not as isolated as it is today.

== Mining ==
The 1908 OS map shows the location of two shafts close to a square raised water tank that represents the site of the 1770s Caprington Newcomen atmospheric pumping engine that helped drain the Caprington coalfield. The location of the site from which the 1770s Newcomen Atmospheric Beam engine originally came was the 'Caprington Colliery' with its numerous pits and the pumping engine itself located in Earlston. The engine is now displayed in the National Museum of Scotland.

The engine worked more or less continuously for around ninety years and had its wooden beam replaced by a cast-iron one in 1837. It is not clear where the water was pumped to for disposal, however a square and embanked tank once stood near by and this may have been piped down to the old loch site to enter the burn.

== See also ==
- Bickering Bush
- Galrigs Loch, Ayrshire
- Helenton Loch
