= Glenfield (company) =

- Industry: Hydraulic engineering
- Founded: 1865 in Kilmarnock, Ayrshire
- Successors: Glenfield and Kennedy; Glenfield/AVK; Glenfield Invicta
- Headquarters: Kilmarnock, Scotland
- Key people: Thomas Kennedy (snr); Thomas Kennedy
- Owner: AVK Holdings A/S

Glenfield is a large industrial manufacturing company based in Kilmarnock, Ayrshire, Scotland. At its height it was reckoned to be the largest company of its type in the Commonwealth.

== Company history ==
Thomas Kennedy (senior) was a watch and clockmaker, who moved to Kilmarnock in 1824 from Argyleshire. At around that time, he patented the Kennedy Water Meter, which he designed with the help of John Cameron, another watchmaker in Kilmarnock. A valve directs water entering the meter into a cylinder of known volume containing a piston. As the piston rises and falls, the measured quantity of water is expelled and the mechanism is connected to recording dials to track the volume of water used.

In 1863, the Kennedy Patent Water Meter Co Ltd was established on a site formerly used by the Glenfield Printing Works. Two years later, Kennedy established Glenfield Co Ltd on the same site, which specialised in the supply of castings and general foundry work. Kennedy's nephew, also called Thomas Kennedy, directed both companies between 1871 and 1904, when they experienced a period of significant growth. The companies were merged in 1899, to become Glenfield and Kennedy, and became an important hydraulic engineering concern in Britain, with substantial export orders to most parts of the world. The company was affectionately known as ‘The Glen'.

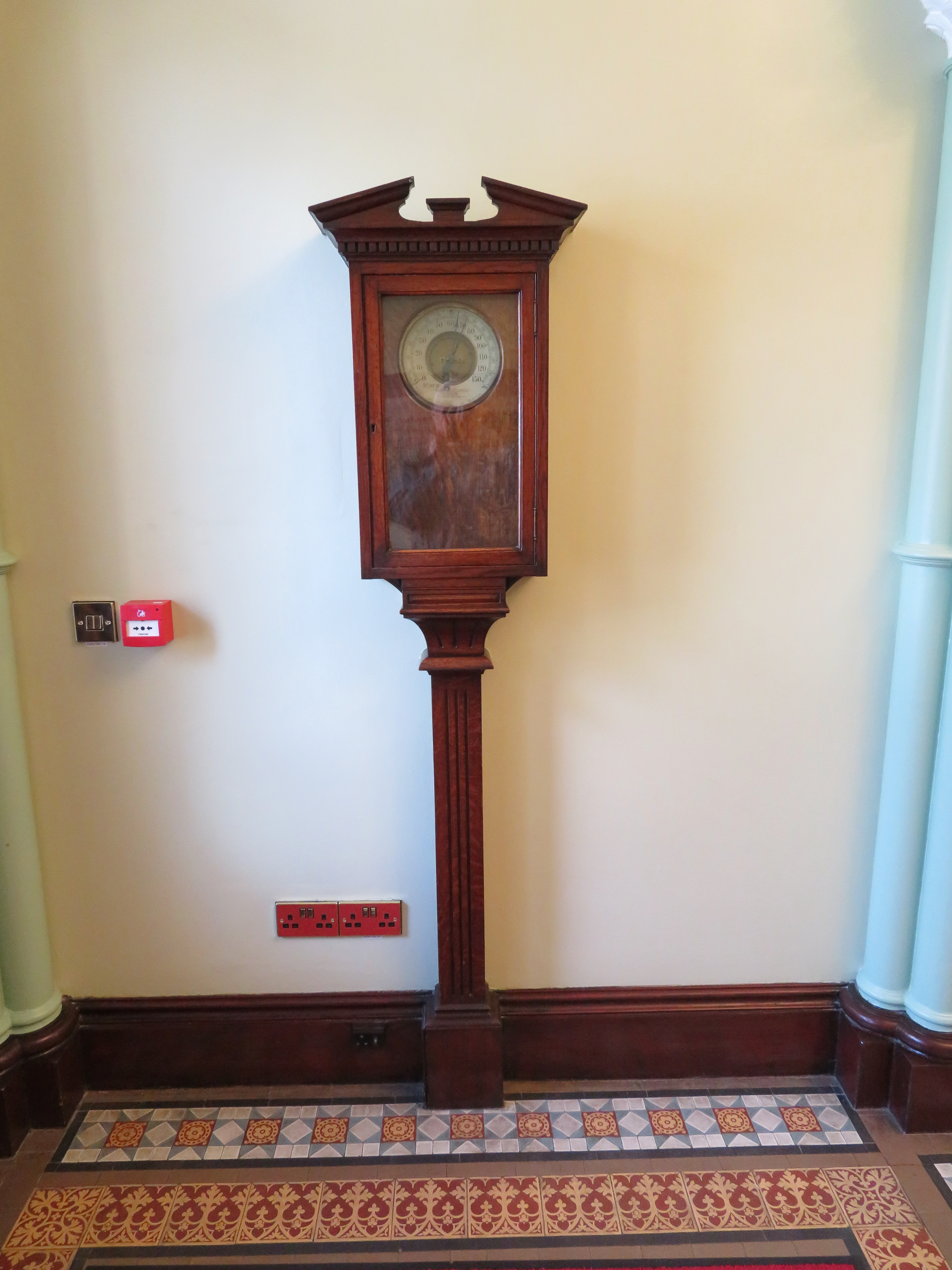
19th century Glenfield water meter

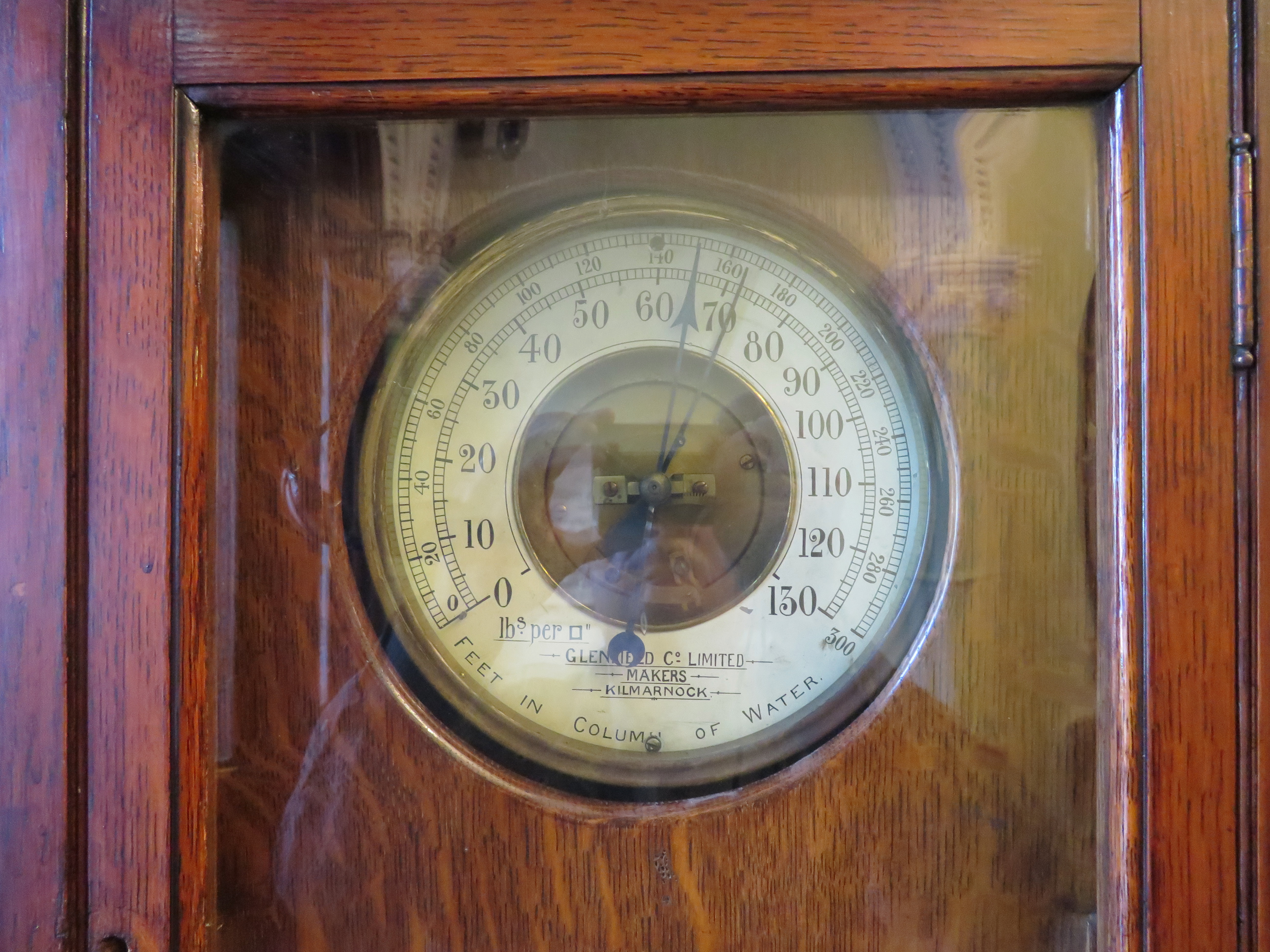
19th century Glenfield water meter closeup of meter face

A subsidiary company, the British Pitometer Co Ltd, was established in 1921 and was also based in Kilmarnock. Another subsidiary, Hydrautomat Ltd, was established in 1924 and was based in London. The company was liquidated voluntarily in 1931, and reformed to become Hydrautomat (1931) Ltd. The parent company continued to expand, and acquired Alley & MacLellan Ltd in the 1940s. This company had been founded in 1875 in Bridgeton, Glasgow, and initially manufactured valves. They later diversified into making compressors, vacuum pumps and steam engines, before being taken over by Glenfield and Kennedy.

In 1982 the manufacturing site on Low Glencairn Street was demolished, after a new site had been established on Queens Drive, Kilmarnock.

In 1985, Glenfield and Kennedy was acquired by Biwater, a company which had been founded in 1968 by Adrian White CBE. The name reflected the fact that the company was involved in the treatment of two types of water, clean water for drinking and waste water from sewers. Originally located at Beckenham, once part of Kent but now in Greater London, they transferred to Dorking in Surrey in 1971. The takeover was part of Biwater's policy of buying up established companies in the UK water industry. However, this was a relatively short phase in Glenfield's history, as Biwater sold the valves operation in 1996 and the penstocks and pumps business in 1998.

In 2001, Glenfield Valves became a member of AVK Holdings A/S, and traded as Glenfield/AVK. AVK Holdings is a Danish company founded by Aage Valdemar Kjaer. They are now known as Glenfield Invicta, although they are still owned by AVK Holdings. Invicta were known for site solutions, penstocks and flood defence solutions, while Glenfield produced valves for dams, reservoirs and hydro-electric schemes. Both companies were subsidiaries of AVK Holdings, and they merged their operations on 6 January 2020.

== Major projects ==
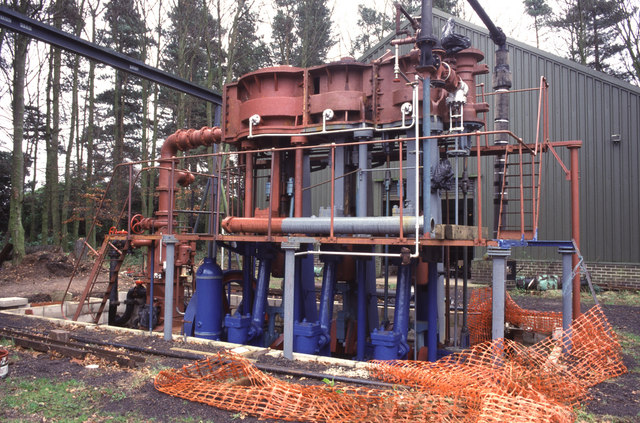
This inverted triple expansion pumping engine was supplied to Stanton Ironworks in 1897. It is now at Papplewick Pumping Station, where it is steamed regularly.

Glenfield and Kennedy were involved in a number of major projects through the years. In the early 1930s they won the contract for the design and construction of Kinloch Rannoch weir for the Grampian Electricity Supply Company. This consists of three flood gates, each 40 feet (12 m) wide, designed to regulate the depth of Loch Rannoch at its outlet to a maximum of 8 feet (2.4 m). The impounded water is used to generate hydro-electric power at Tummel power station, which is located further downstream on the River Tummel.

When the outbreak of war was distinctly possible in 1938, they were approached to manufacture flood gates for the London Underground, as there were fears that bomb damage could result in flooding of the tunnels and the complete disruption of the system. The first floodgate was installed on 1 September 1939, coinciding with the date of the German invasion of Poland. A total of 25 floodgates were quickly installed to protect the nine stations most at risk of serious flooding. These were South Kensington, Embankment, Charing Cross, Waterloo, London Road, London Bridge, Wapping, Bethnal Green and Bank. Fifty stations were identified as needing protection, and Glenfield successfully fitted floodgates at 31 of them without disrupting the train service. Services had to be temporarily suspended while the gates were fitted at the remaining 19 stations, as the engineering work was more extensive. Glenfield used tilting, radial, sliding or lift gates, depending on the requirements of each site. The gates were closed during air raids, and re-opened when the danger of flooding had passed.

They were also involved in the supply of valves for PLUTO, the Pipe Line Under The Ocean associated with World War II's Operation Overlord. The pipelines carried petrol across the English Channel to support the allied invasion of France towards the end of the war.
