= Helenton Loch =

Coordinates: 55°33′1.4″N 4°32′52.6″W

Helenton, also Ellingtone
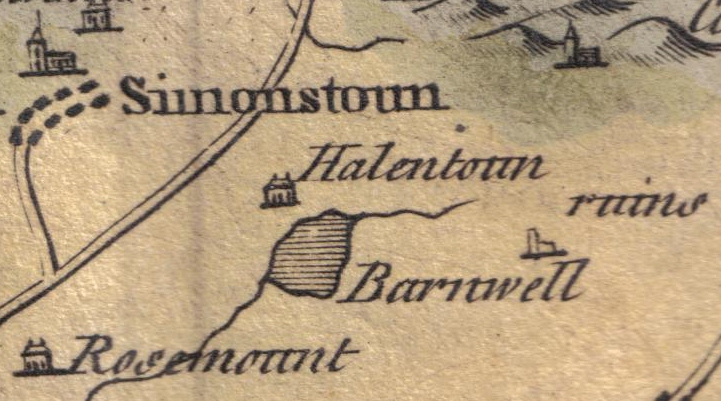
- The site of Helenton Loch in 1811

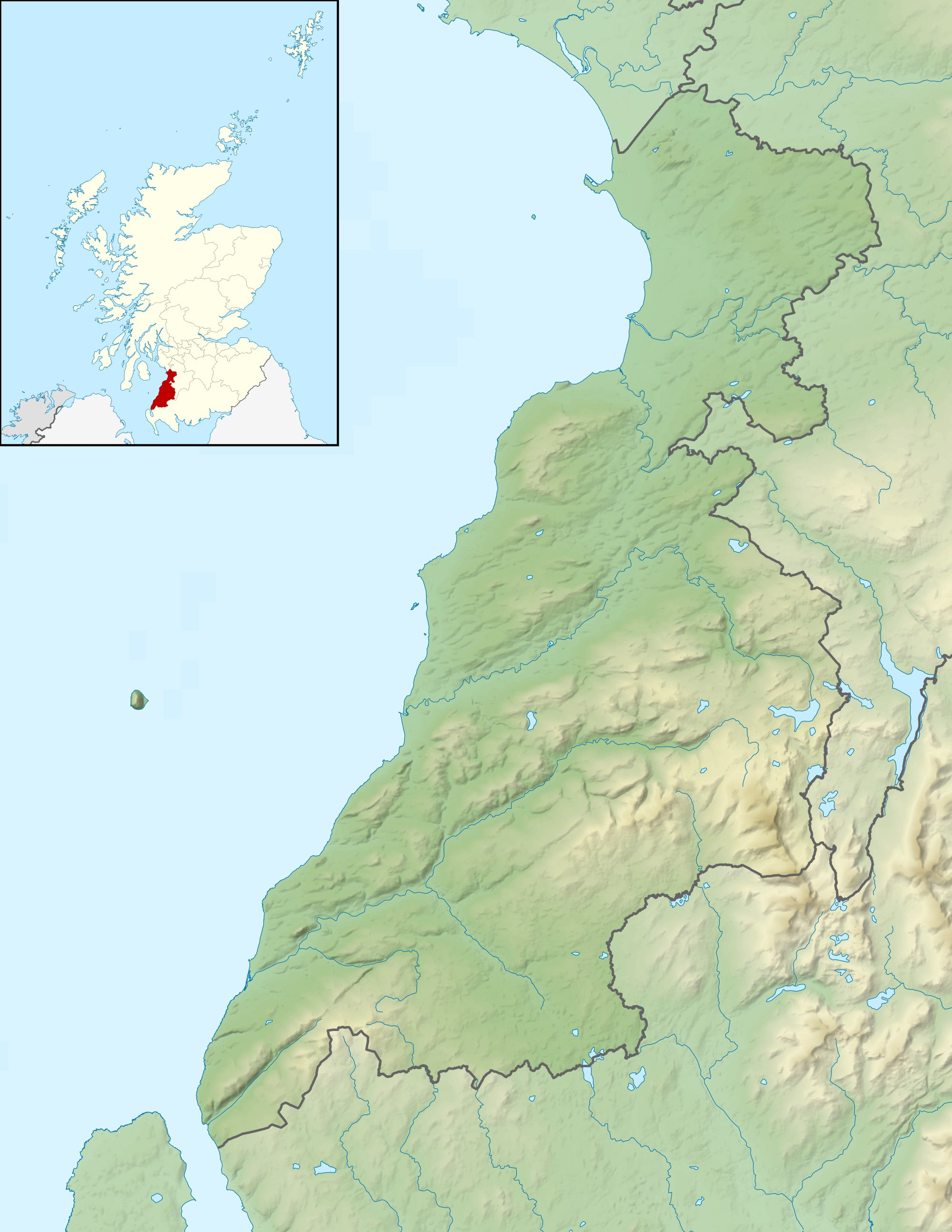
- Location within South Ayrshire
- Location: Symington, South Ayrshire, Scotland
- Type: Drained freshwater loch
- Primary inflows: Damhead and Pow Burns
- Primary outflows: Pow Burn
- Basin countries: Scotland
- Islands: None
- Settlements: Kilmarnock

Helenton Loch was situated in a low lying area between the farms and dwellings of Helentongate, Mains, and Burnbank in the Parish of Symington, South Ayrshire, Scotland. The loch was natural, sitting in a hollow, a kettle hole, created by glaciation. The loch waters ultimately drained via the Pow Burn. Helenton Hill is a prominent landmark to the west of the old loch site. The nearby lands of Rosemount were in 1549 known as 'Goldring' and were the property of the Schaws of Sornbeg.

== History ==
=== The Loch ===
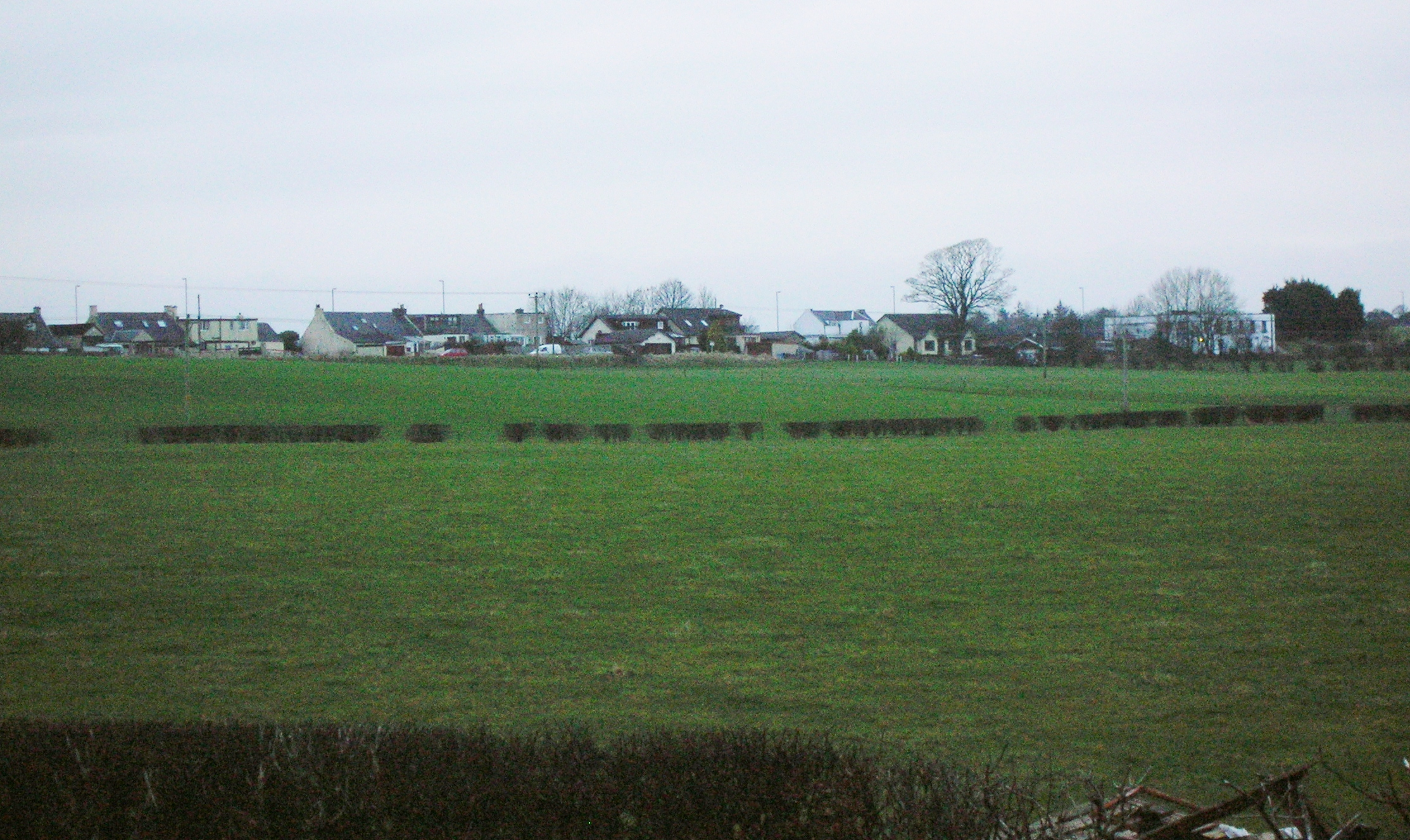
A view over the loch site and of the hamlet of Whitelees.

The loch is recorded as Ellingtone Loch on Roy's survey of 1747-55, and Elintoun Loch on Blaeu's map of 1654, surveyed by Timothy Pont in the early 1600s, with an 'Elintounmur' nearby. Ainslie's map of 1821 records the name 'Helenton'. Aitons map of 1811 records the house and loch clearly and uses the spelling 'Halentoun'. Thomson's map of 1832 shows the loch and a mill pond serving Helenton Mill.

Armstrong's Map of 1775 shows a substantial loch bordering the mansion house and wooded policies of Helentoun. The 1857 OS map records only a small loch at the site. The 1860s OS map shows a lane running up to the 'mill pond' or loch remnant from the Helentongate to Helenton Road in the 1860s.

The loch was drained to provide land for agriculture and a mill pond substituted. The loch remnant is now a well-drained area in the fields of Helentongate Farm.

=== Helenton Mill ===
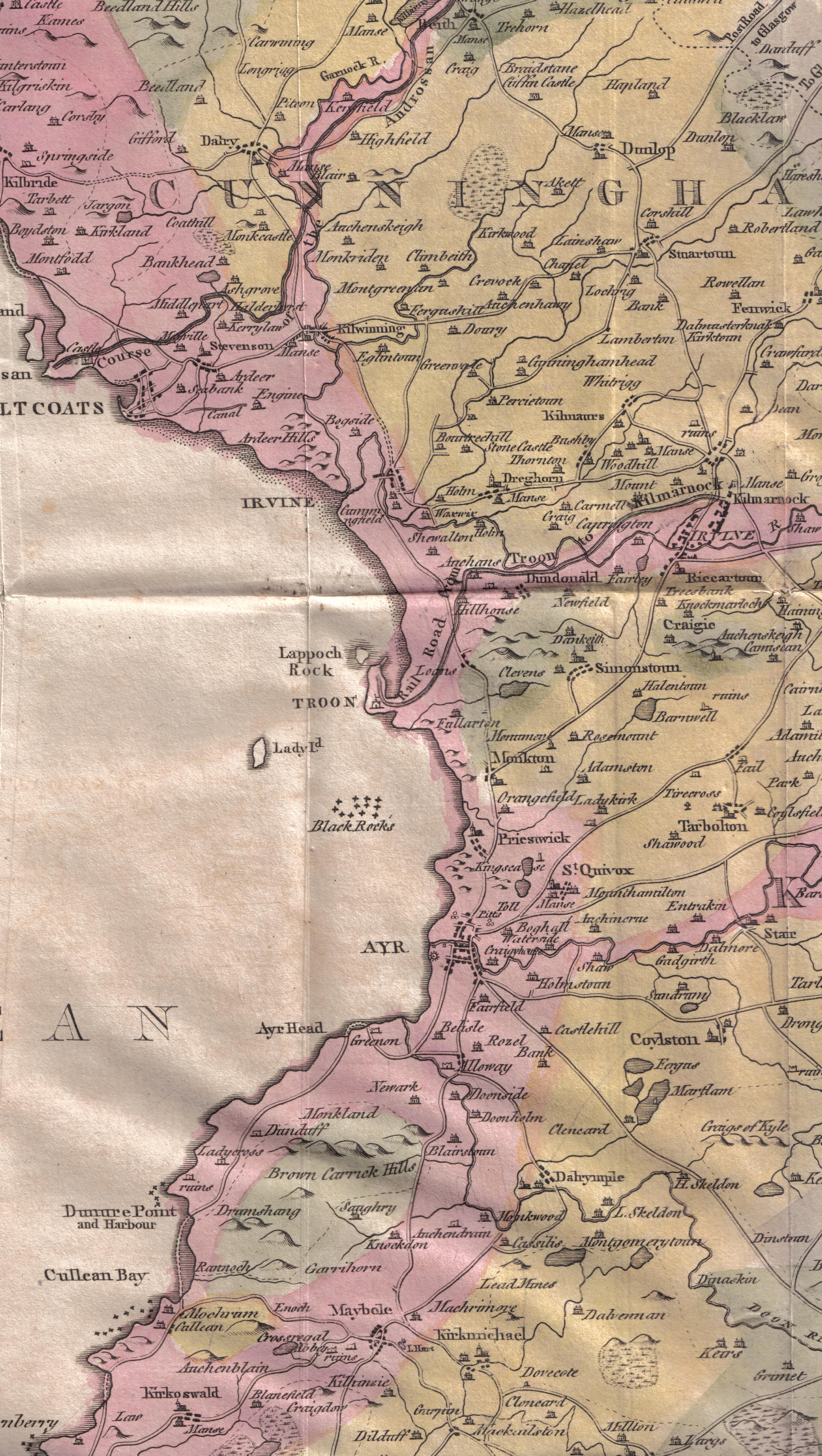
Aiton's map of 1811 showing Helenton Loch.

Previous location of Helenton Loch, South Ayrshire

The loch may have served as the head water for Ellingtone or Helenton Mill which is dated from 1583 in one source and 1549 in another. Two dams provided the head of water and the fall was around eleven feet powering a breast wheel and driving the two pairs of stones from Kameshill at West Kilbride. Half a ton of oatmeal per hour was the maximum milling rate. Provender for cattle was produced in addition to oatmeal. The mill had been built for the benefit of the tenants by the Montgomeries of Eglinton and one half of the machinery belonged to the miller.

In 1583 William Wallace of Ellerslie held half the mill. In 1875 Adamson records the old corn and saw mill as being ruined when he passes this way when walking from Underhill, crossing the footbridge over the Pow Burn to the mill and then continuing on to the lane to Helentongate and Symington. It had closed in 1858.

A Robert Calderwood, aged 68, is shown as living at Helenton Mill in 1841. He was a miller who married Margaret Wilson 1799. The couples children were Elizabeth born Symington, and siblings were born in Craigie - James, Janet, Andrew, Adam, Margaret, Jean, John, William, David, Alexander and Walter who died at Perclewan, Dalrymple in 1903.

The OS maps show that a cottage once sat in the field opposite the mill entrance, most probably the miller's dwelling.

The mill pond is now an infilled area near Helenton Mote, following the closure of the mill in the late 19th century. A footpath is shown on OS maps as running down from Underhill and then crossing the Pow Burn at the old mill.

In 1884, three-quarters of a mile of the Catcraig Road was removed from Helenton Mains to Benacres, thereby truncating the route following the closure of the corn and sawmill at Helenton.

Helentongate is recorded as a curling site by the Royal Caledonian Curling Club.

=== Land ownership ===
In 1549 Andrew Schaw of Sornbeg is recorded as holding the lands of Goldring (Rosemount), Knockindail, and Helentoun Mains with the mill.

Johne Schaw of Polkemmet next held the lands of Helentoun with its tower, mains, mill, and part of the lands of Helentoun Muir. In 1582 John Schaw, son and heir, inherited the five pound lands of Helentoun. He also inherited the lands of Goldring after they had both been held by the King for a period of three years.

Helenton was a part of the Lands of Symington until it came to lie within the Barony of Sanquhar-Hamilton, named for the family of Hamilton of Sanquhar.

James Stewart, Earl of Arran held the lands for a time, however they passed to the Wallaces of Craigie and in 1583-4 it is recorded that William Wallace of Ellerslie held the lands of Mains of Helentoun and Bogend, together with the tower, fortalice, and manor place of Helenton, together with half of the mill.

William Wallace of Helenton is recorded as having married Elizabeth Cunningham of Kilmaronok (sic) in the mid 17th century.

=== Etymology ===
The derivation of the name is far from clear as 'Helenton' does not appear as a spelling on the maps until the late 16th century, variations of the name 'Ellington' being used by cartographers prior to that date. The village of Ellington in Northumberland may derives its name from the Saxon first name 'Ella'. The Scots word 'Elenge' means remote or lonely. The name 'Pow' or 'Poll' refers to a slow-moving ditch-like stream.

== Rev William Auld ==
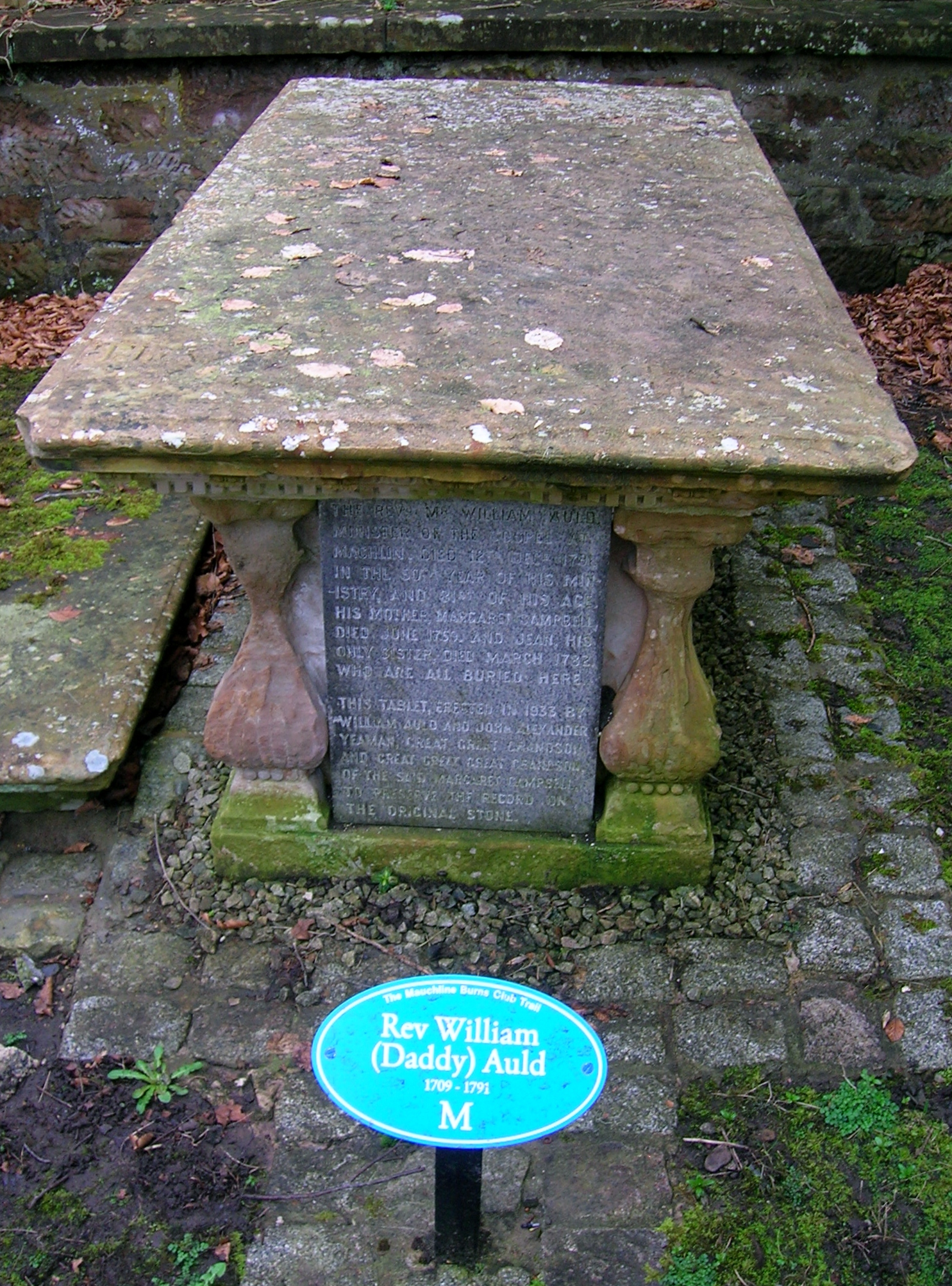
William Aulds gravestone at Mauchline.

The minister at Mauchline Kirk at the time of Robert Burns was the somewhat fanatical 'Auld Licht' Rev William 'Daddy' Auld, born at Auld Ellanton or Helenton Farm in 1709. He was the younger son of the Laird of Ellanton (sic), his mother being Margaret Campbell. The poet and Jean Armour appeared before him for 'irregular behaviour' and he baptised their eldest son Robert as well as his sister Jean.

William Aulds family held a pew within Symington church, shown on the 1797 church seating plan as 'Laird Auld'. His gravestone records that he died aged 81 in the 50th year of his ministry, that his mother was Margaret Campbell and he had an only sister, Jean. He died unmarried.

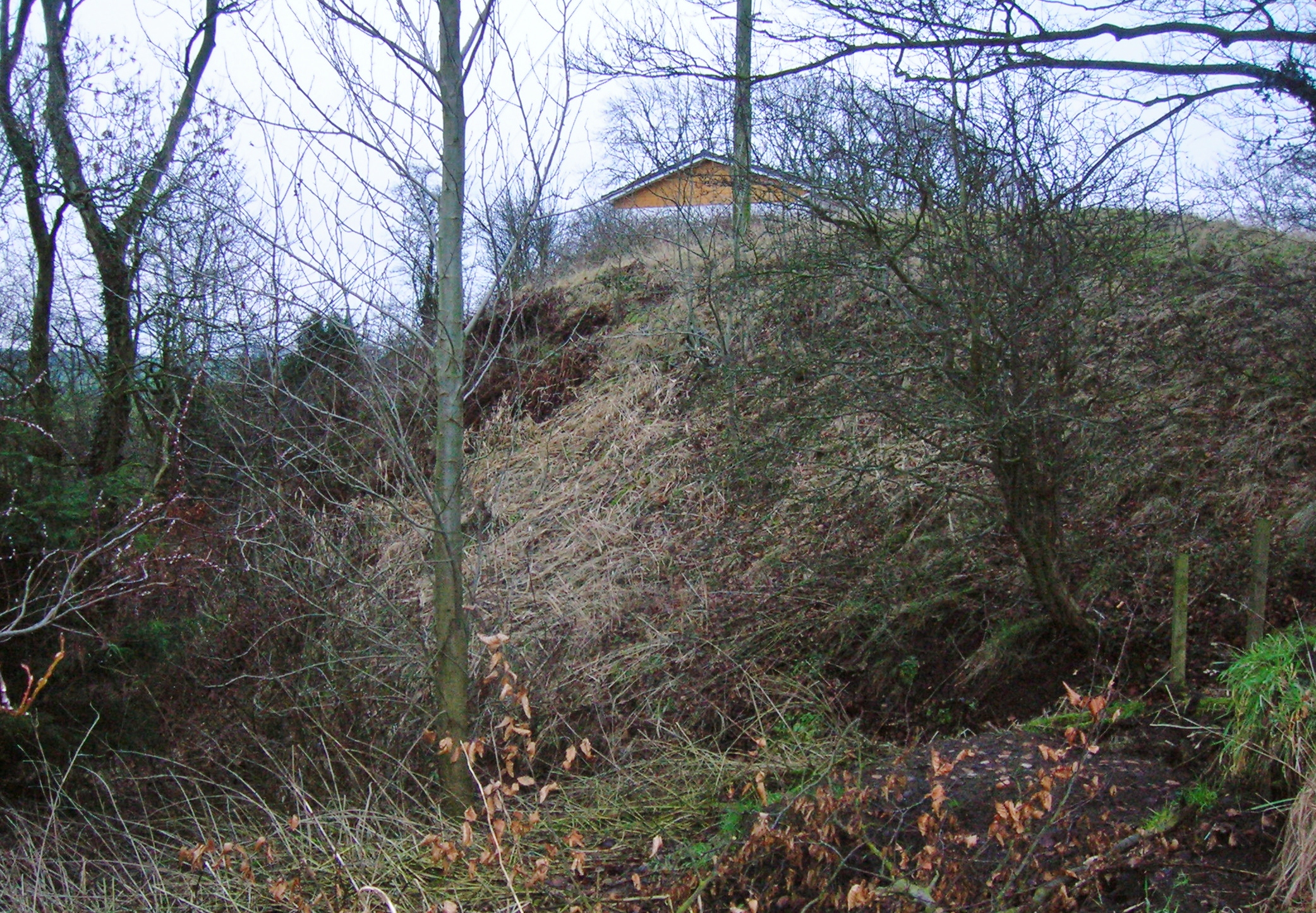
A view of the Helenton Motte and Moot Hill.

== Helenton Motte ==
A motte or Moot hill was located at Helenton, once surmounted by a building and acting as the 'Justice Hill' of the barony of . Smith sees it as a fort with a ditch on the south side but altered in shape due to a lade running close to one side and a road lying on the other.

== See also ==
- Pow Burn

=== References ===
Notes

Sources

1. Archaeological & Historical Collections relating to the counties of Ayrshire & Wigtown. Edinburgh : Ayr Wig Arch Soc. Vol. VI. 1889.
2. Adamson, Archibald R. (1875). Rambles Round Kilmarnock. Kilmarnock : T. Stevenson.
3. McQueen, Colib Hunter (2009). Hunters' Illustrated History of the Family, Friends and Contemporaries of Robert Burns. Messrs. Hunter McQueen and Hunter.ISBN 978-0-9559732-0-8
4. Nimmo, John W. (2003). Symington Village, Church and People. Darvel : Alloway Publishing. ISBN 0-907526-82-9.
5. Paterson, James (1863–66). History of the Counties of Ayr and Wigton. V. - II - Kyle. Edinburgh: J. Stillie.
6. Smith, John (1895). Prehistoric Man in Ayrshire. London : Elliot Stock.
7. Strawhorn, John (1994). The History of Prestwick. Edinburgh : John Donald.ISBN 0-85976-405-2
8. Westwood, Peter (2008). Who's Who in the World of Robert Burns. Kilmarnock : Robert Burns World Federation. ISBN 978-1-899316-98-4
9. Wilson, James Pearson (2000). The Last Miller : The Cornmills of Ayrshire. Ayrshire Monographs No.23. Ayrshire Archaeological & Natural History Society. ISBN 0-9527445-6-2.
