= Craigie Castle =

Ruined fortification in South Ayrshire, Scotland

- Craigie, South Ayrshire, Scotland; UK grid reference NS4084831699
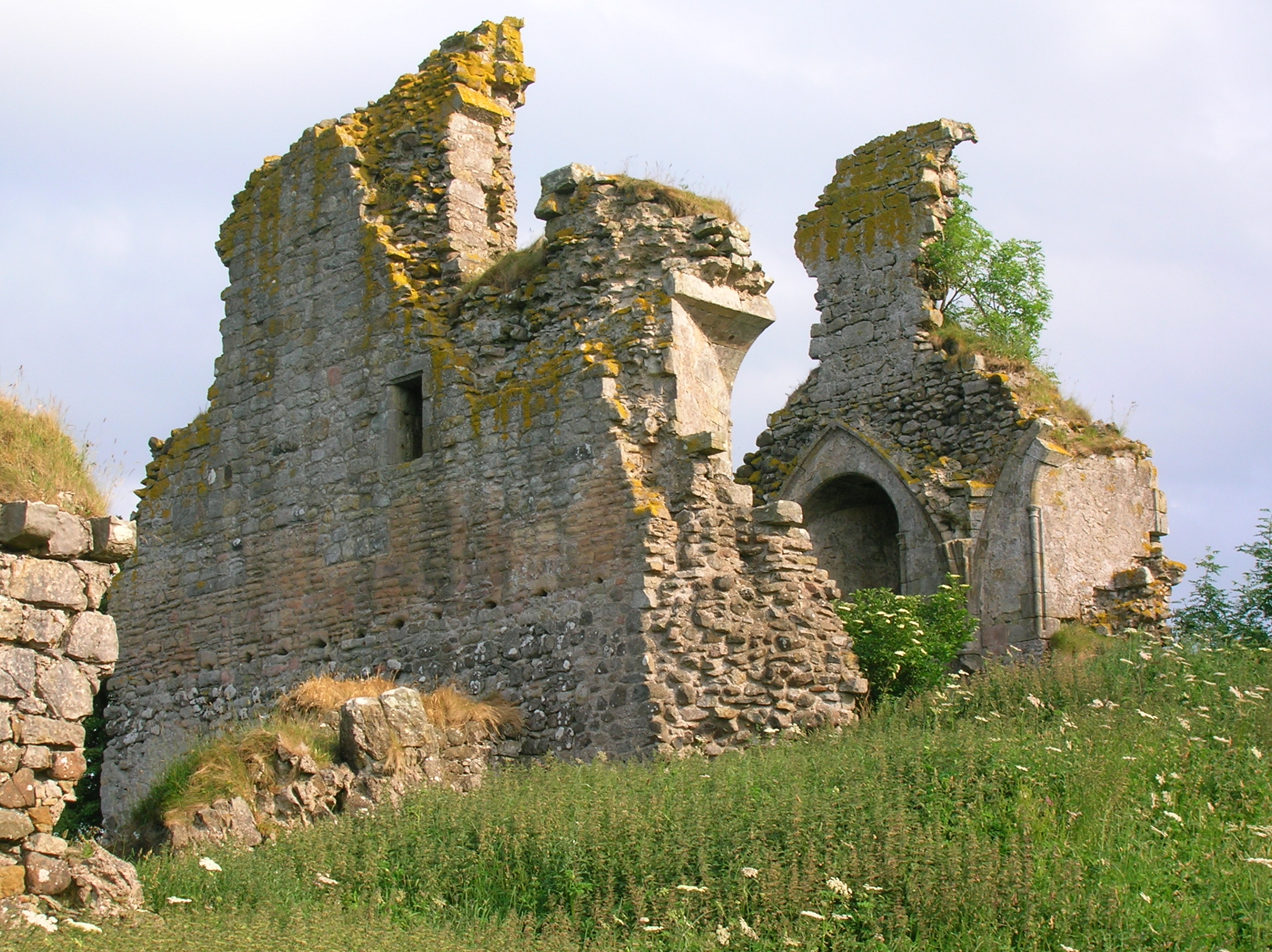
- The keep of Craigie Castle

Site information
- Controlled by: Lindsay clan
- Open to the public: No
- Condition: Ruined

Location
- Location within South Ayrshire
- Location within South Ayrshire
- Coordinates: 55.5529°N 4.5246°W
- Grid reference: grid reference NS408316

Site history
- Built: 12th century
- In use: Until 17th century
- Materials: Stone

Craigie Castle, in the old Barony of Craigie, is a ruined fortification situated about 4 miles (6.4 km) southeast of Kilmarnock and 1 mile (1.6 km) southeast of Craigie village, in the Civil Parish of Craigie, South Ayrshire, Scotland. The castle is recognised as one of the earliest buildings in the county. It lies about 1.25 miles (2 km) west-south-west of Craigie church. Craigie Castle is protected as a scheduled monument.

== History of Craigie Castle ==
Craigie Castle, Gaelic Caisteil Chreagaidh, was originally built for the Lyndesay or Lindsay clan. The castle passed to John Wallace of Riccarton through marriage about 1371 as the last heir was a daughter. This line of the Ayrshire Wallaces then lived at Craigie Castle until they moved to Newton Castle in Ayr in 1588. Craigie Castle was then left to fall into ruin. It was the belief of Mrs Frances Dunlop of Dunlop, a lineal descendant of William Wallace, that he was born at his grandfather's home of Craigie Castle. William only moved away after a number of years had passed due to the burgeoning size of the family and the lack of space at Craigie.

=== Descriptions of the castle ===
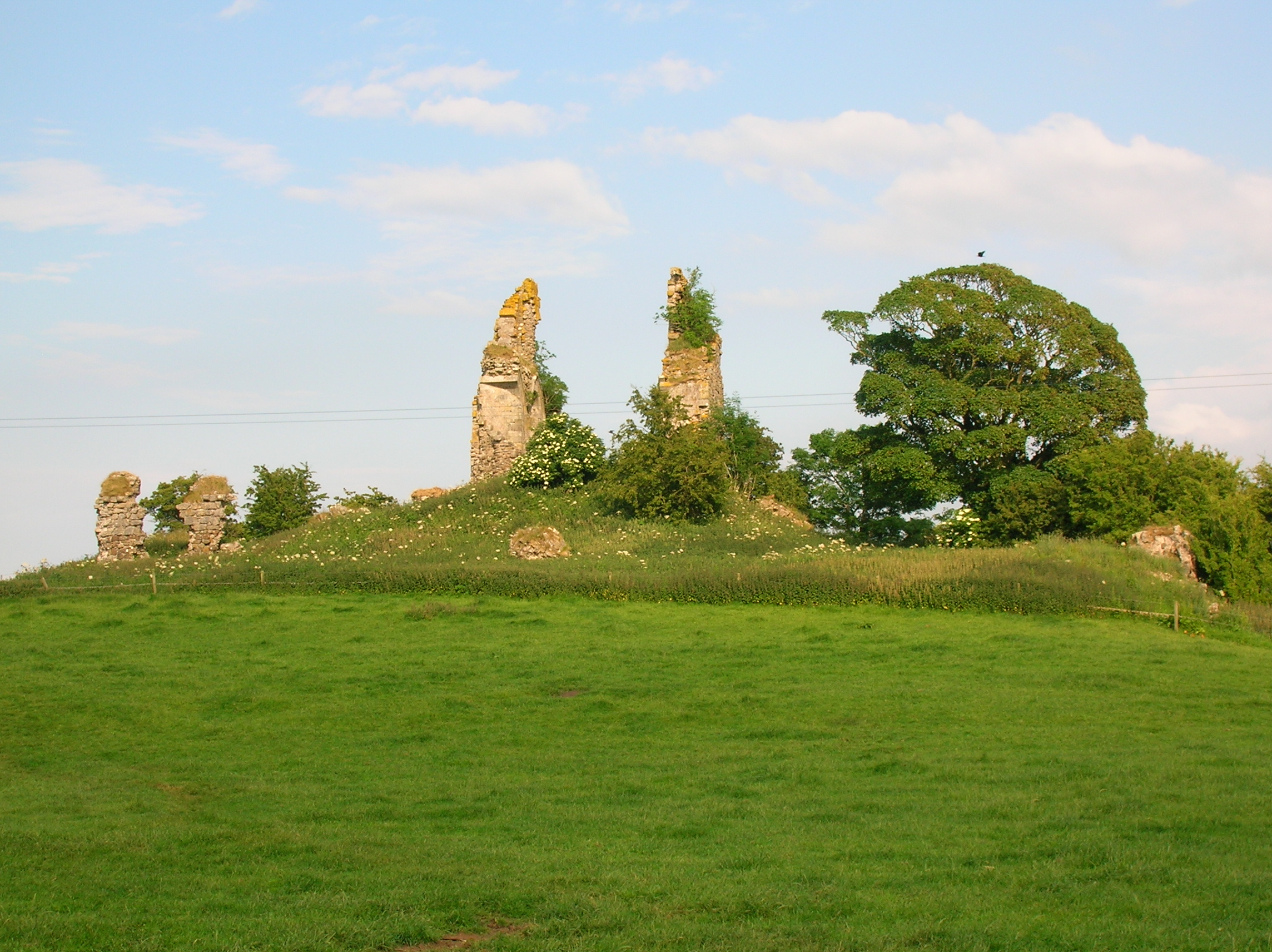
Craigie Castle from Craigie Mains farm

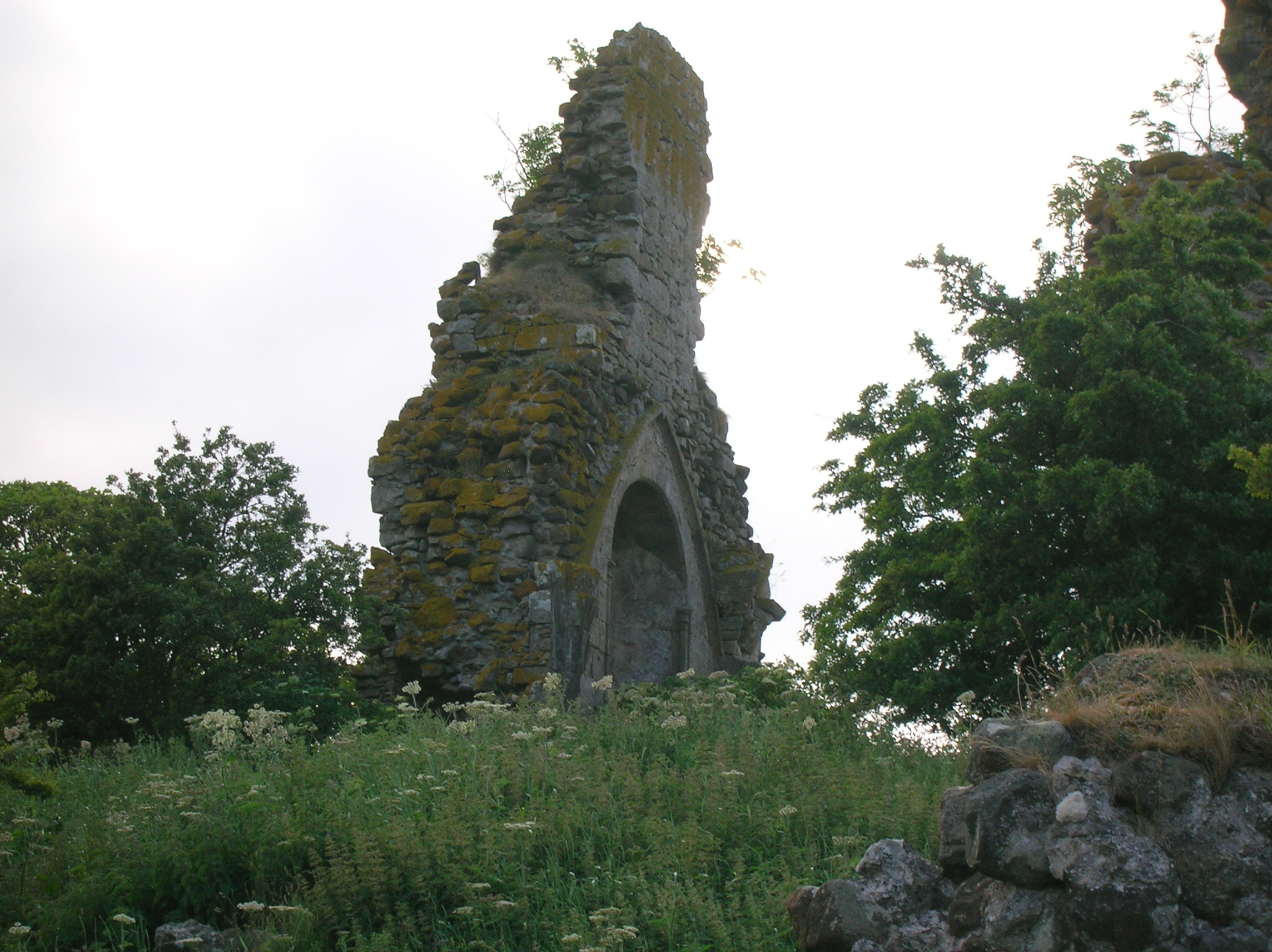
The south facing wall of the keep showing high quality stonework

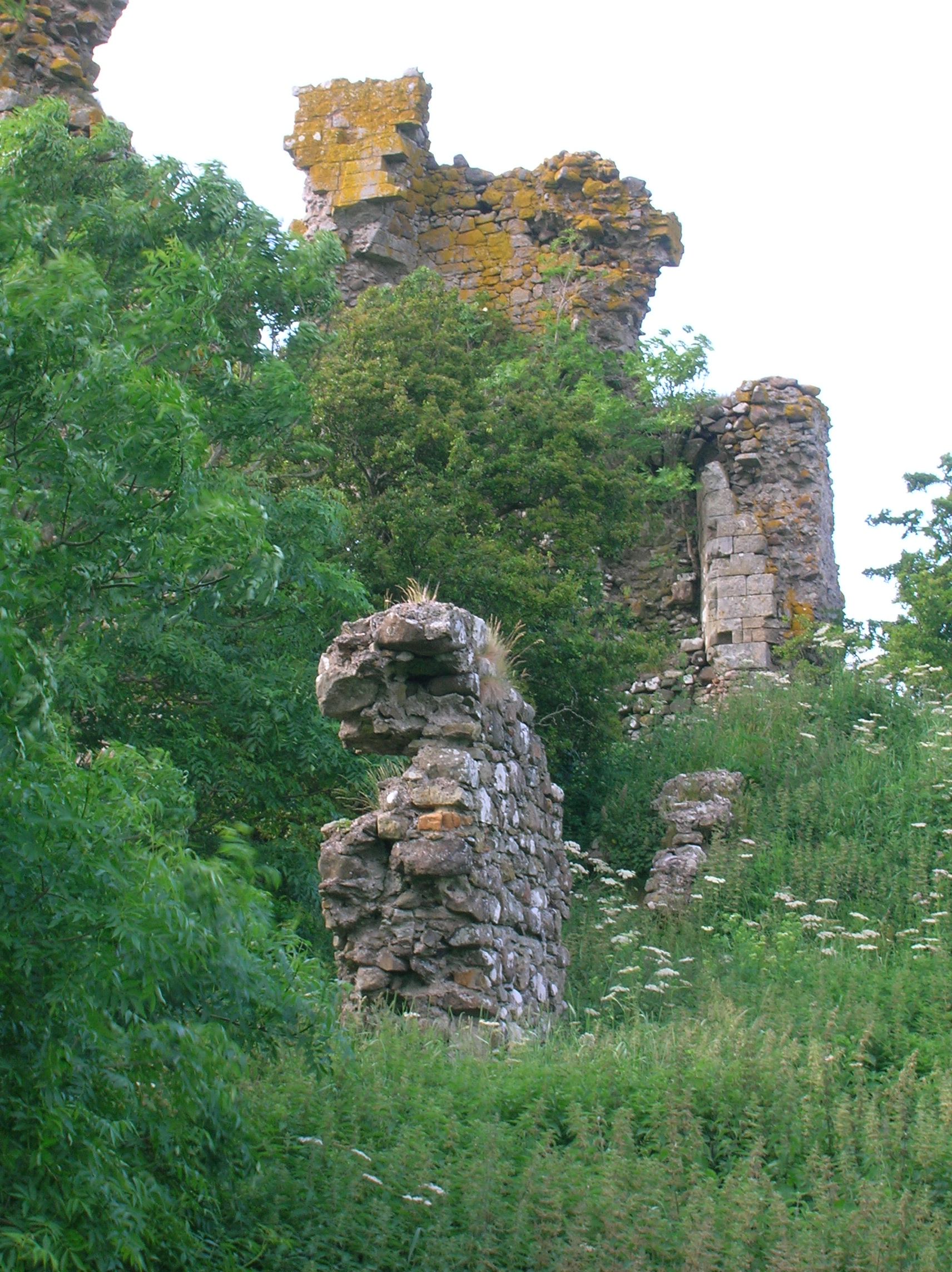
Part of a courtyard wall.

The present Gothic castellated ruins date mainly from the 15th century, with some 12th or 13th century work. Another view is that the main part of the building was a hall house dating from the 12th or 13th century, incorporating an even earlier building which may have been built by the predecessors of Walter Hose who held sway prior to Anglo-Norman control.

The buildings were surrounded by ditches and natural lochans; enclosing an area of about 4 acres (16,000 m^{2}). It had a high quality rib-vaulted hall consisting of three bays over an unvaulted basement, but architectural historians have found traces of an earlier hall which had a crenellated parapet rising flush with the main wall-face. In the centre of one wall was a round-arched doorway, and opposite this a late medieval fireplace, added in the 15th century, was built over another round-arched opening.

The castle contains one of the finest examples of a vaulted hall in Scotland, easily equal to any Scottish abbey or church. The only rivals of the same period are Tulliallan, Bothwell, and Auchendoun. It has been stated that in its time Craigie was the most impressive building of its kind in Ayrshire.

Due to the condition of the structures it has proved difficult to determine the original plan, but the remains suggest that it was originally a simple rectangle of suitable size for a building such as an early hall-house. Craigie Castle may originally have been a hall-house of the late 12th or early 13th century with a wide crenellate parapet enclosing a saddleback roof. During the 15th century it seems that these crenellations were built over and a new hall fashioned on the walls of its predecessor.

The ruins stand upon a knoll rising out of a plateau, between what appears to have been two marshes or lochans, and the ditches were originally cut between them. One ditch cuts the ridge 117m NE of the castle to form an outer bailey. The castle would have been effectively isolated from the 'mainland', and a significant barrier raised by the water to any potential besiegers at the period when the use of gunpowder was unknown. Two crumbling gables, portions of walls, and shreds of battlements remain, and in the 19th century several underground vaulted chambers survived, although partly filled with rubbish, and home to foxes and bats. The entrance to the castle was at the south-west side by a drawbridge, of which the abutment still survives. The entrance pend or arched passage had a circular watch-tower or bastion to defend it. Within the closing wall was a courtyard surrounded by buildings, and from this courtyard there was an entrance into the great hall, long blocked up.

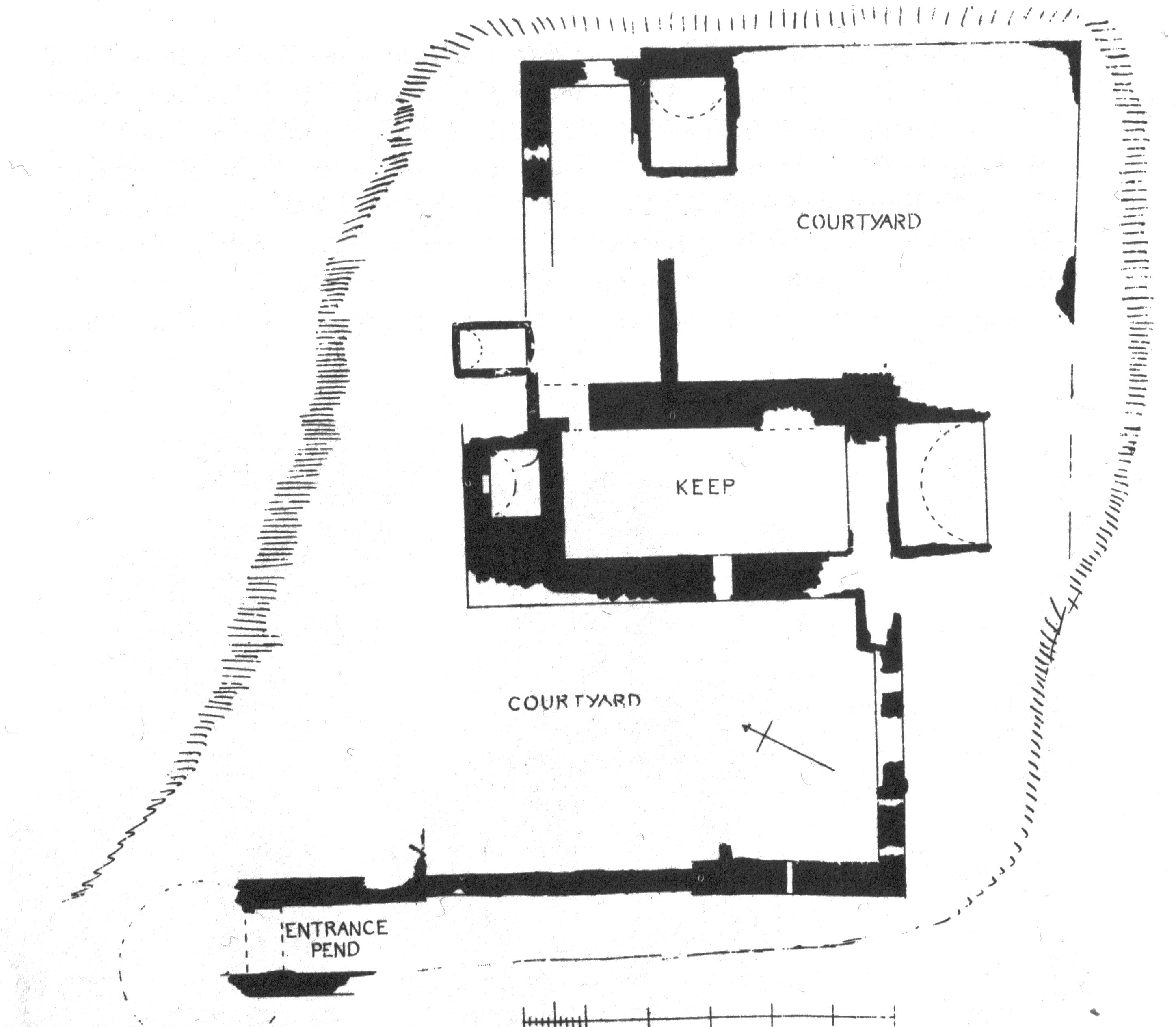
A plan of the castle.

In 1895 Smith records that at a distance of 145 paces from to the north-east of the castle a deep trench has been cut in a north-west and south-east direction for a distance of 162 paces, to connect the two lochans. Near the south wall of the castle there is another trench, and a section of building is to be seen on the outside of it. On the west side there are the remains of a third trench.

In 1863 Paterson records that the tower was undergoing some repairs at the end of the 17th century when a part of the roof fell in, after which the castle was completely abandoned. He praises the high degree of military science employed in the construction of the castle where besiegers would be exposed to raking crossfire even after crossing the ditches / moats and would be outflanked on nearly all sides.

A 'Kragy' castle is marked on Timothy Pont's map of c.1600. It is shown on an elevated area with a prominent entrance way, wooded policies and a surrounding pale.

Although now a minor road, the road running near the castle (B730) was the main route from Irvine to Dumfries via Sanquhar, with a nearby link to the Ayr–Kilmarnock road; Craigie was therefore on one of the few reasonable standard communication routes in the area in the 18th and earlier centuries. The numerous rigs on Roy's 1752 map show that the whole area was intensively cultivated at the time.

=== Crannog ===
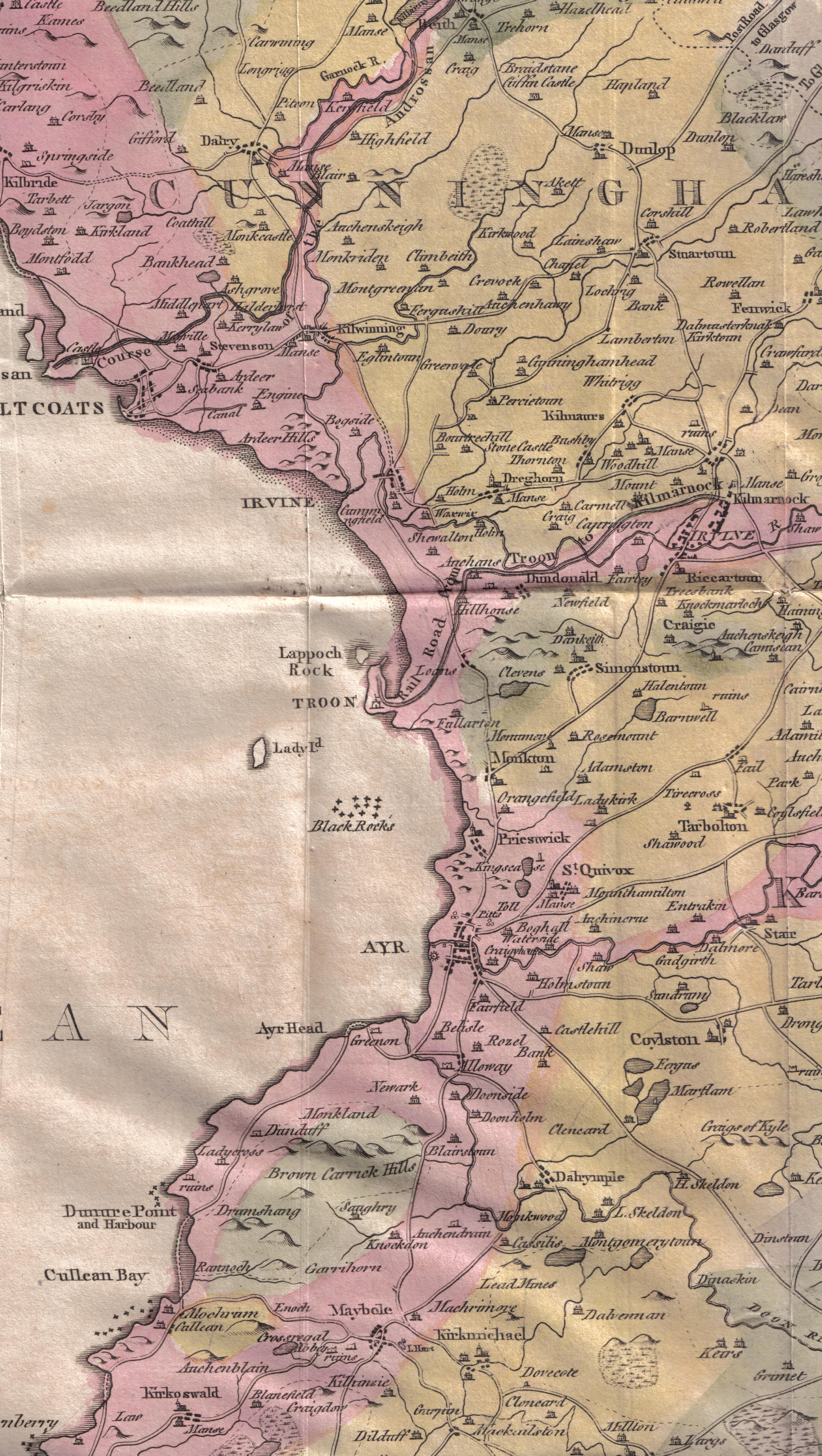
William Aiton's map of 1811 showing Craigie.

As late as the 19th century a likely crannóg was visible in the boggy hollow 'just to the south-west' of Craigie Castle; it was described as a slight rise in the meadow...mostly composed of stones. When the hollow was drained an oar was found.

=== Moot hills ===
Smith records moot hills near Craigie village, Knockmarloch and Highlangside. The barony would originally have had a Moot or Justice Hill and a gallows hill.

=== Borland Farms ===
Three Borland Farms have been recorded near Craigie village and this may relate directly to Craigie Castle. The name 'Boarland' could refer to the presence of wild boar, however a more likely origin is that a 'Boor' also meant a serf and Norman lords often apportioned lands near their castles for their servants. The Borland or Bordland also meant the land that was specifically used to furnish food for a castle. A 'Boirland' is marked on the Timothy Pont map as far back as the late 16th / early 17th century.

== Craigie Mains farm ==
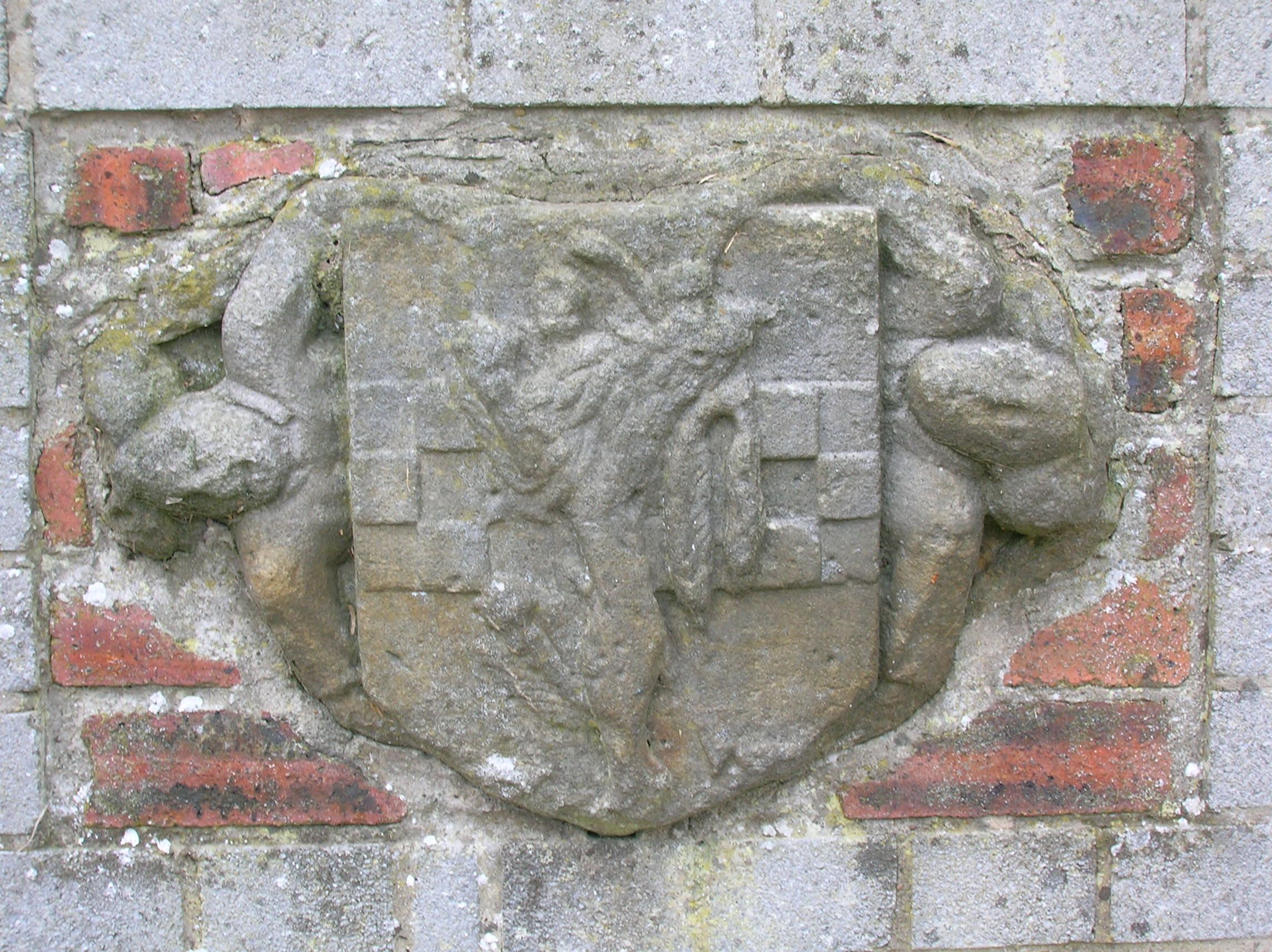
The conjoined Lindsay and Wallace Coats of Arms with supporters.

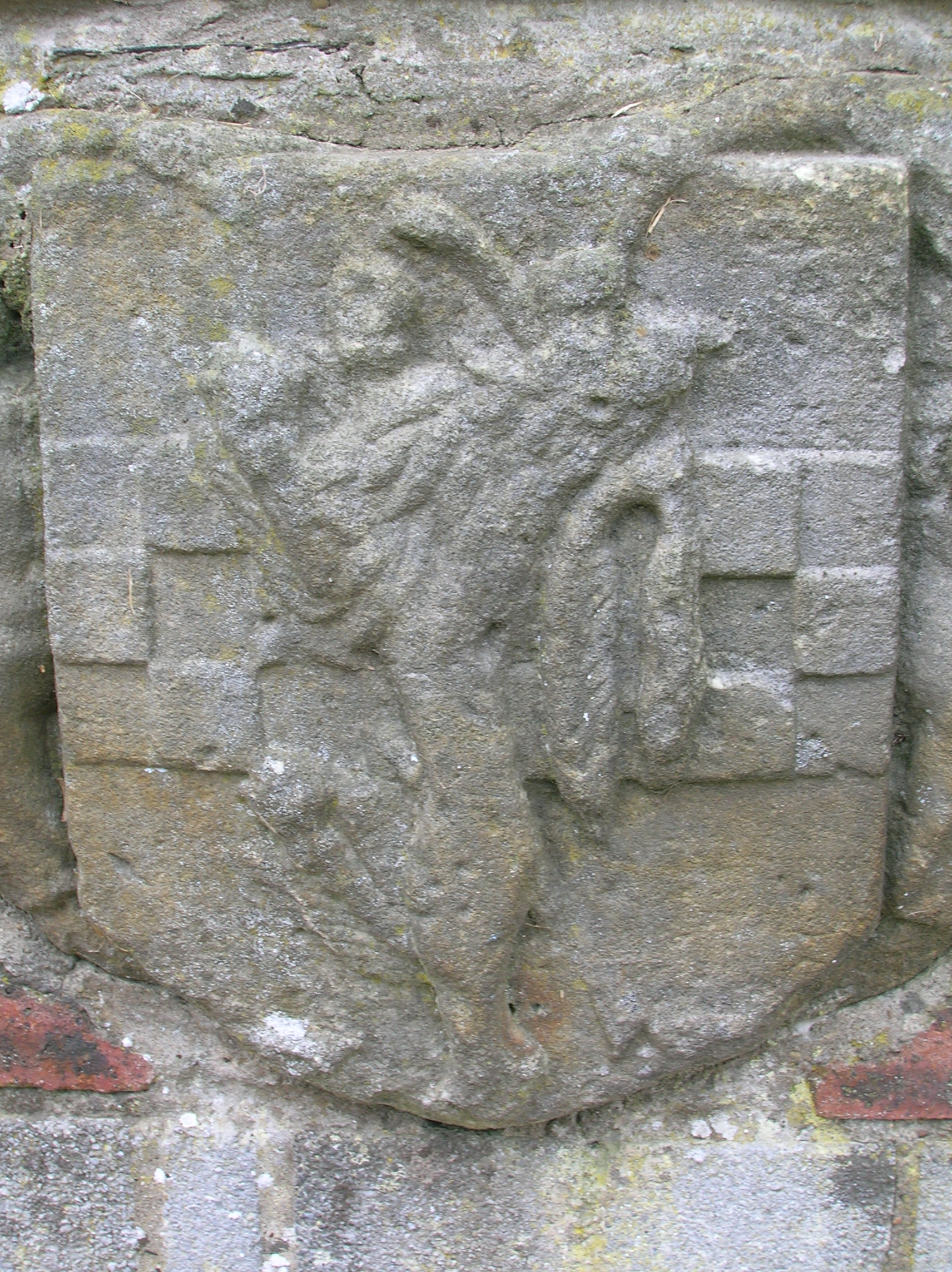
Detail of the conjoined Wallace and Lindsay arms.

An armorial plaque from the castle ruins is set in the wall of the steading (NS 4 062 3174). The naive peasantry at one time believed that the stone showed two wild men playing at draughts. It bears the impaled arms of the Lindsays and Wallaces.

James Kilpatrick of Craigie Mains was a great horseman who considerably improved the breeding lines of the Clydesdale horse and was famous throughout Britain and the World. Some his champions were: 1918, Craigie Litigant; 1921, Craigie Excellence; 1924, Craigie McQuaid; 1925, Craigie Exquisite; 1929, Craigie Winalot; 1930, Craigie Beau Ideal; 1933, Craigie Realisation; 1935, Craigie Magnificent; 1939, Craigie Independent; 1941, Craigie Topsman; 1942, Craigie Chieftain; 1947, Craigie Supreme Commander; 1948, Craigie True Form. In 1951 Craigie Mains had about 80 head of horses. James Kilpatrick regularly exhibited his Clydesdales, colts and fillies in all their finery at the annual Craigie Agricultural Show in the 1900s.

The famous 'Baron of Buchlyvie' was purchased for £700 by Mr Kilpatrick in 1902 and was the stud horse at the mains in 1903. Mr William Dunlop of Dunure Mains had a half share and after much disagreement the 'baron' ended up at Dunlop Mains, having been sold at auction or £9,500; an unheard of sum for a Clydesdale at the time. The mounted skeleton of this horse is now on display at the Kelvingrove Art Gallery and Museum in Glasgow.

Matthew Anderson the 'Policeman Poet' wrote a poem in honour of Symington and Craigie.

This is an extract –

"The greatest place beneath the sky,
For Clydesdale horse and Ayrshire Kye,
In all the bliss of perfect joy,
They roam the fields sae lovely.
There's Craigie Mains and Laigh Langside,
In them we feel a special pride,
Their name and fame are World wide.
Then hip, hurrah for Craigie!"

== The Hoses and Lindsays of Craigie ==
In the 12th century Walter fitz Alan, Steward of Scotland, held these lands and Walter Hose held his fief from the Steward. In 1177 Walter Hose of Cragyn had given the church of Cragyn to the monks of Paisley. John, probably Walter's son, inherited and his son Thomas had no heir, resulting in his sisters Christiana and Matilda inheriting. Walter de Lyndesay, Knight, was the son of Christiana, the father being William Lyndesey of Crawfurd. The male line ended with John de Lyndesey, whose daughter married John Wallace of Riccarton.

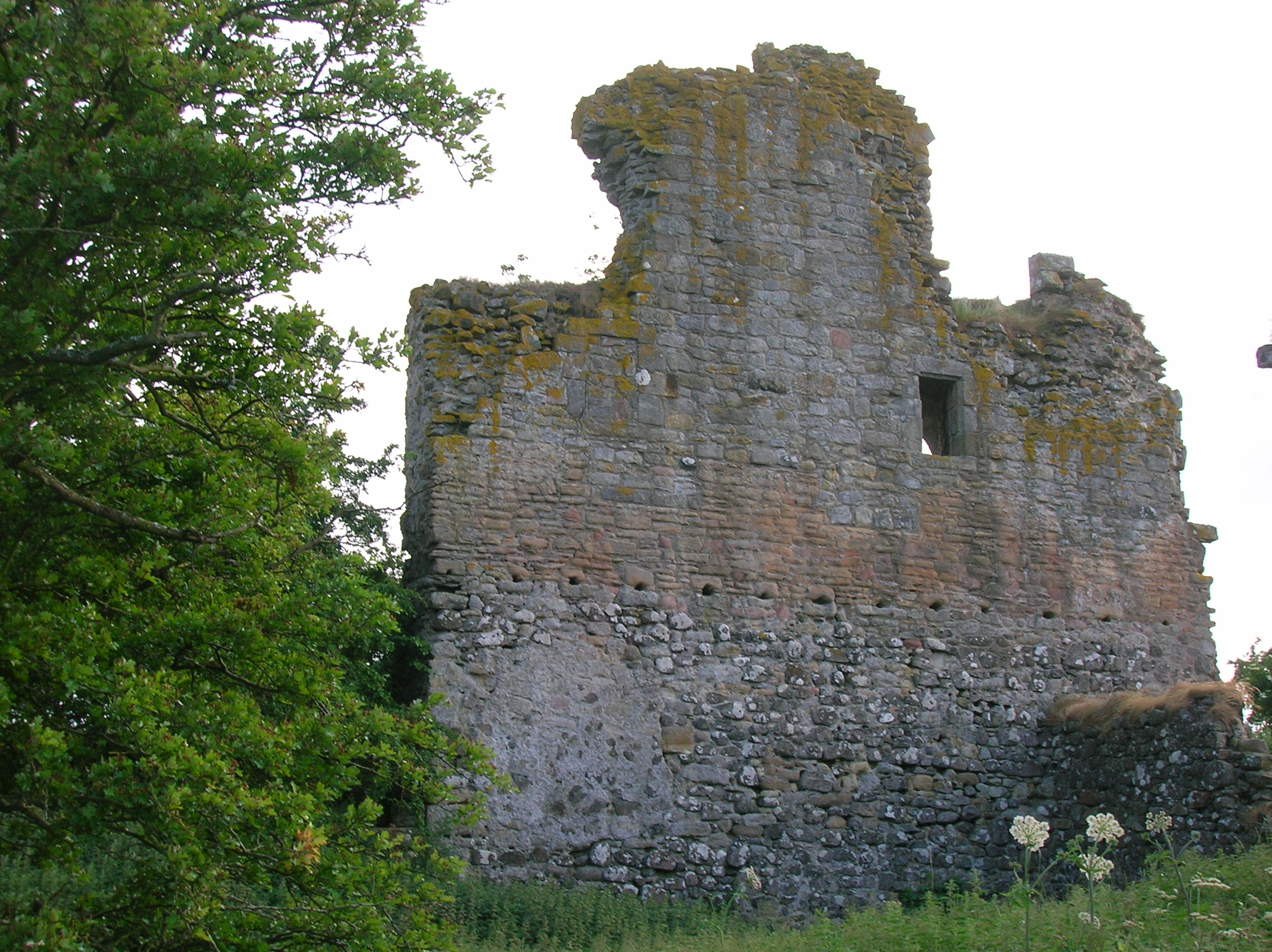
A view of the keep facing North

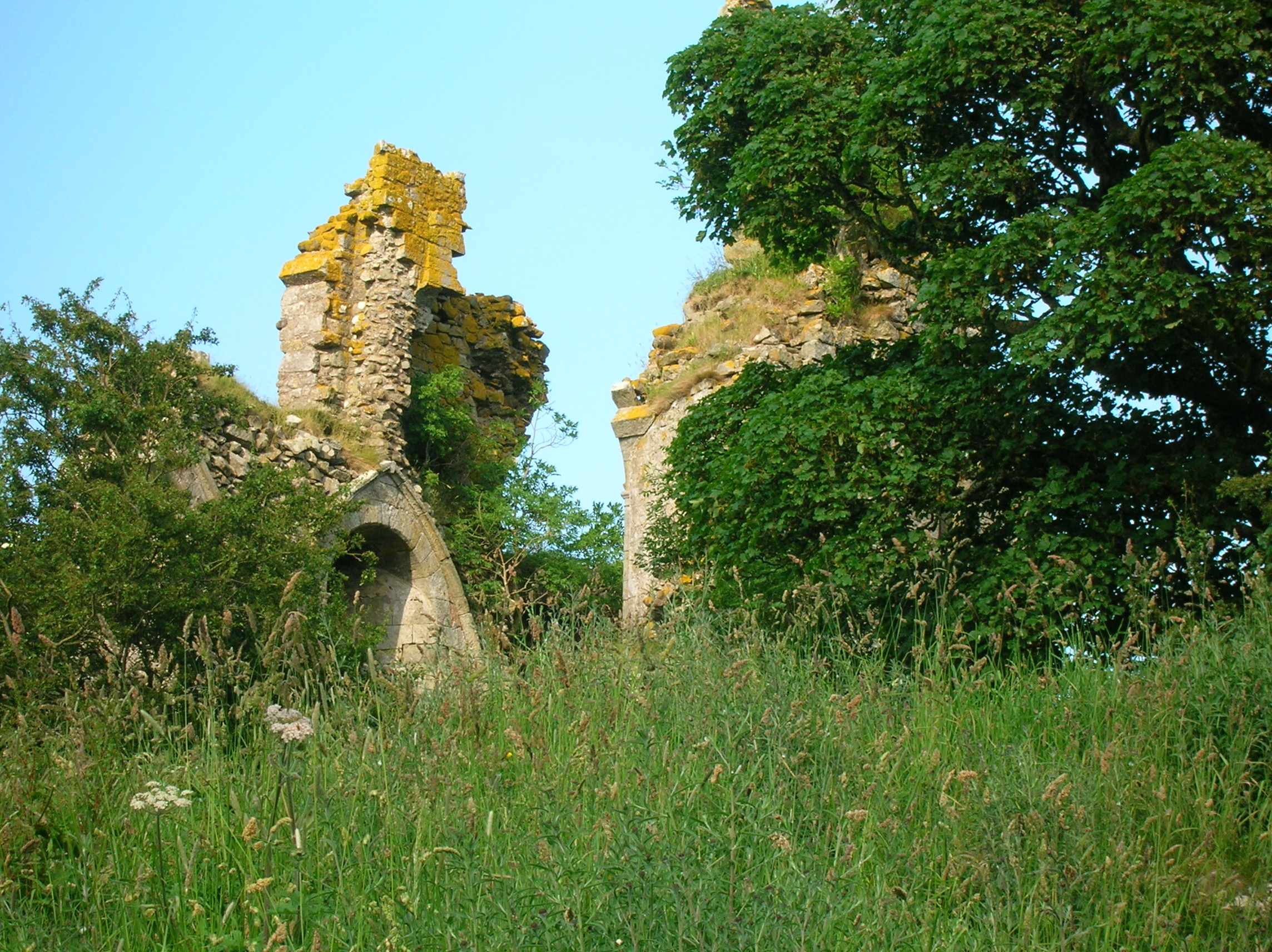
The keep from the South East

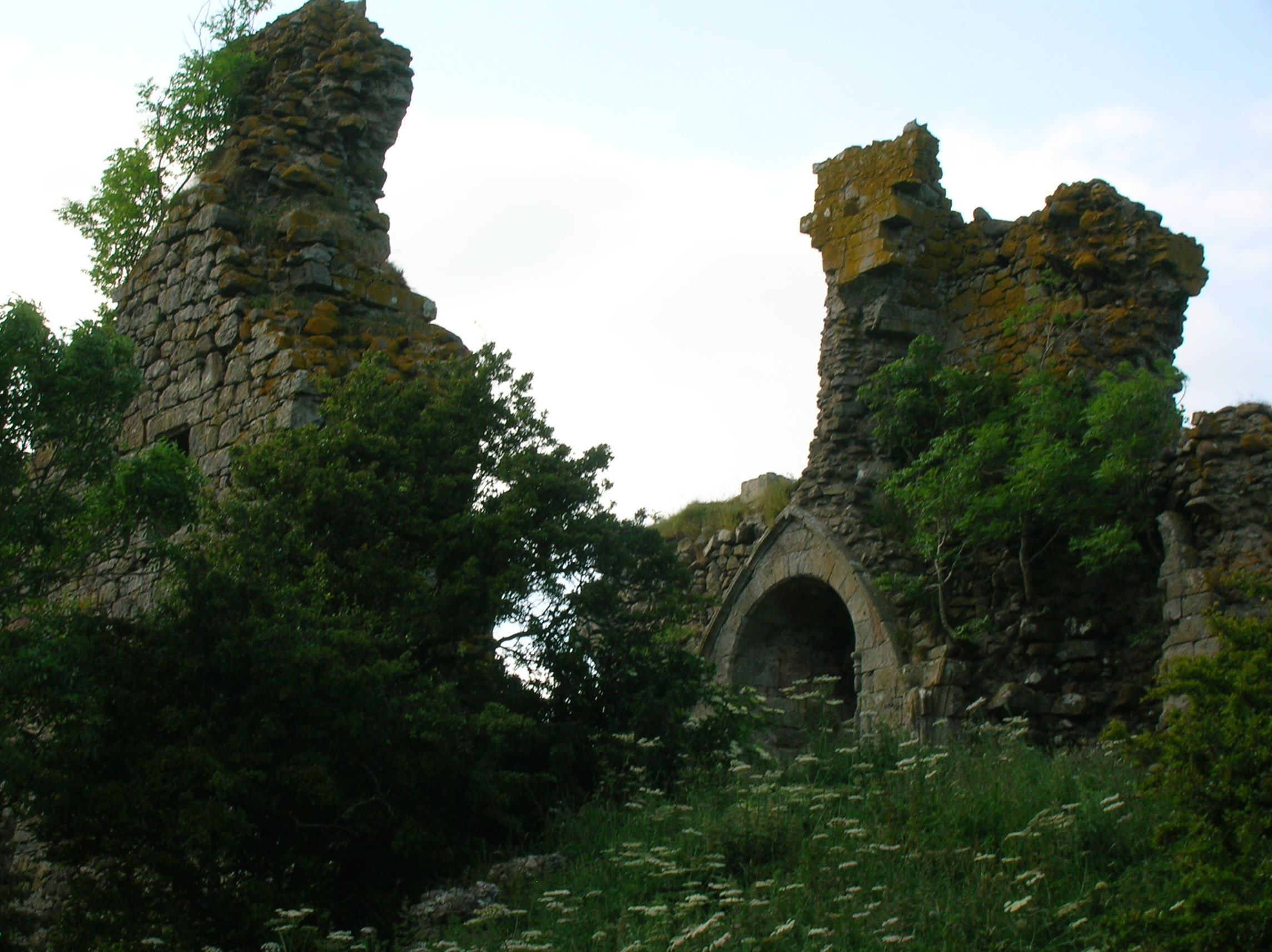
The keep and great hall

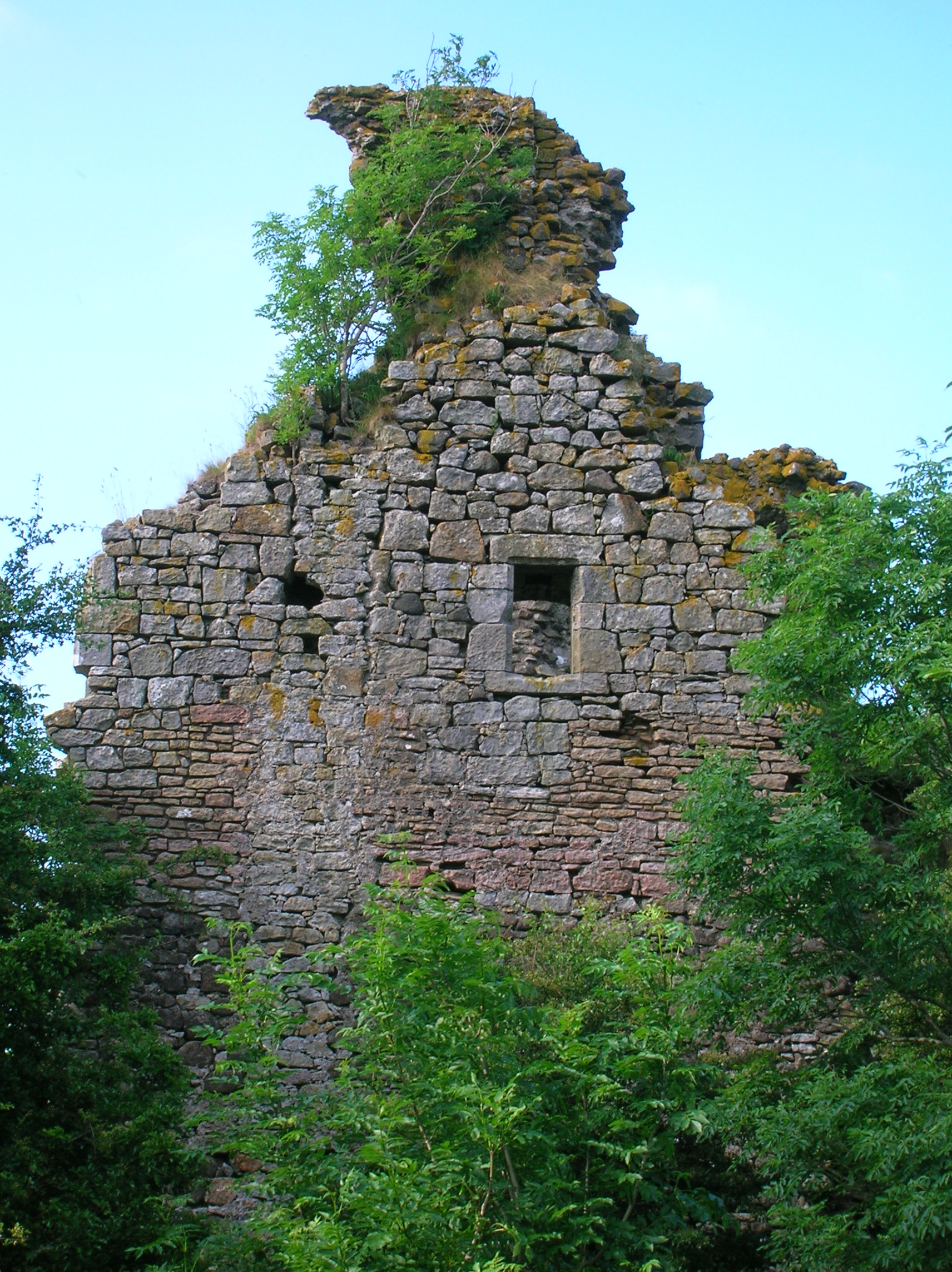
The South facing wall of the keep

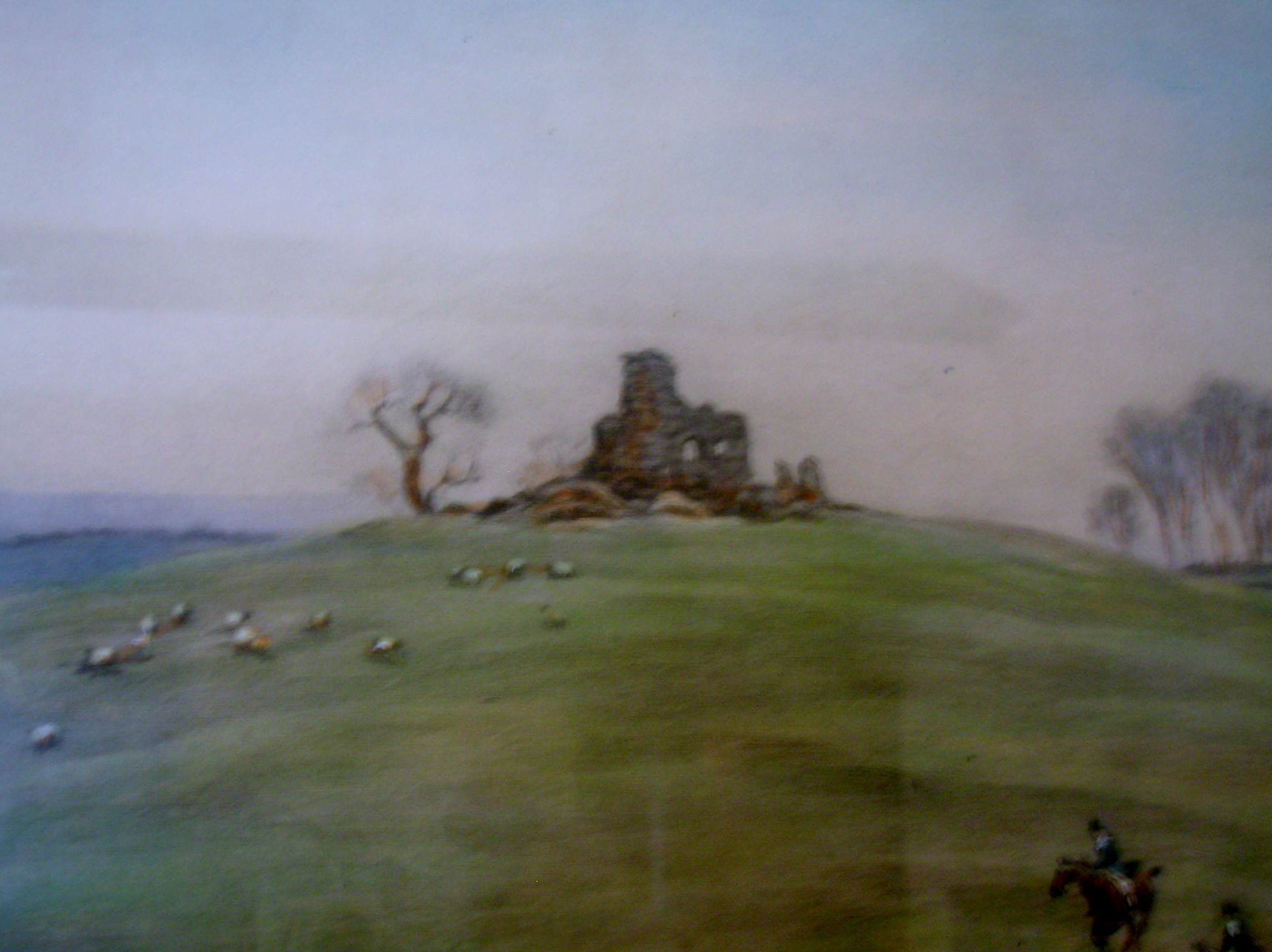
Craigie Castle in 1850

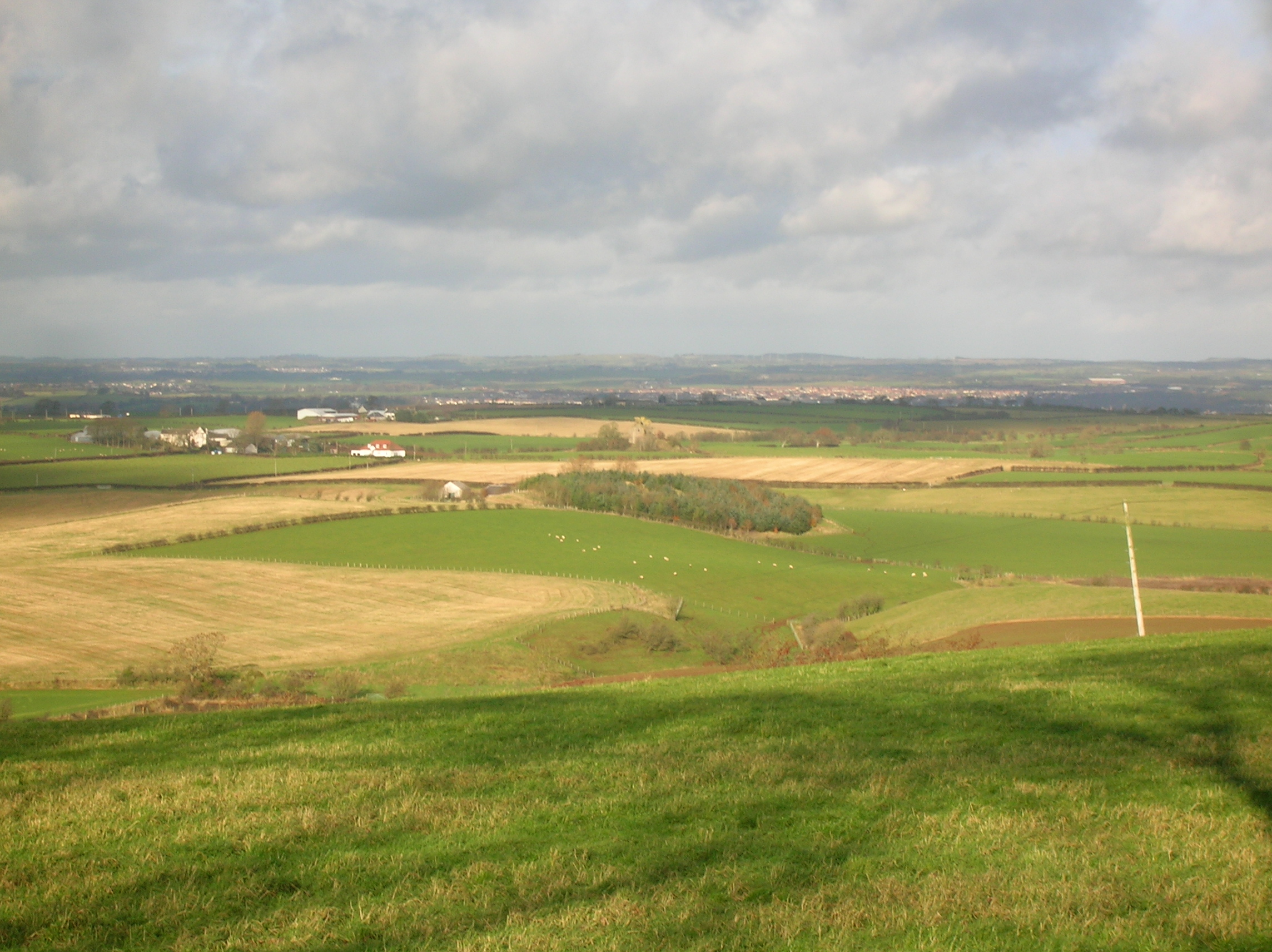
A view of Craigie Castle in its landscape from Barnweill Kirk ruins.

== The Wallaces of Craigie ==
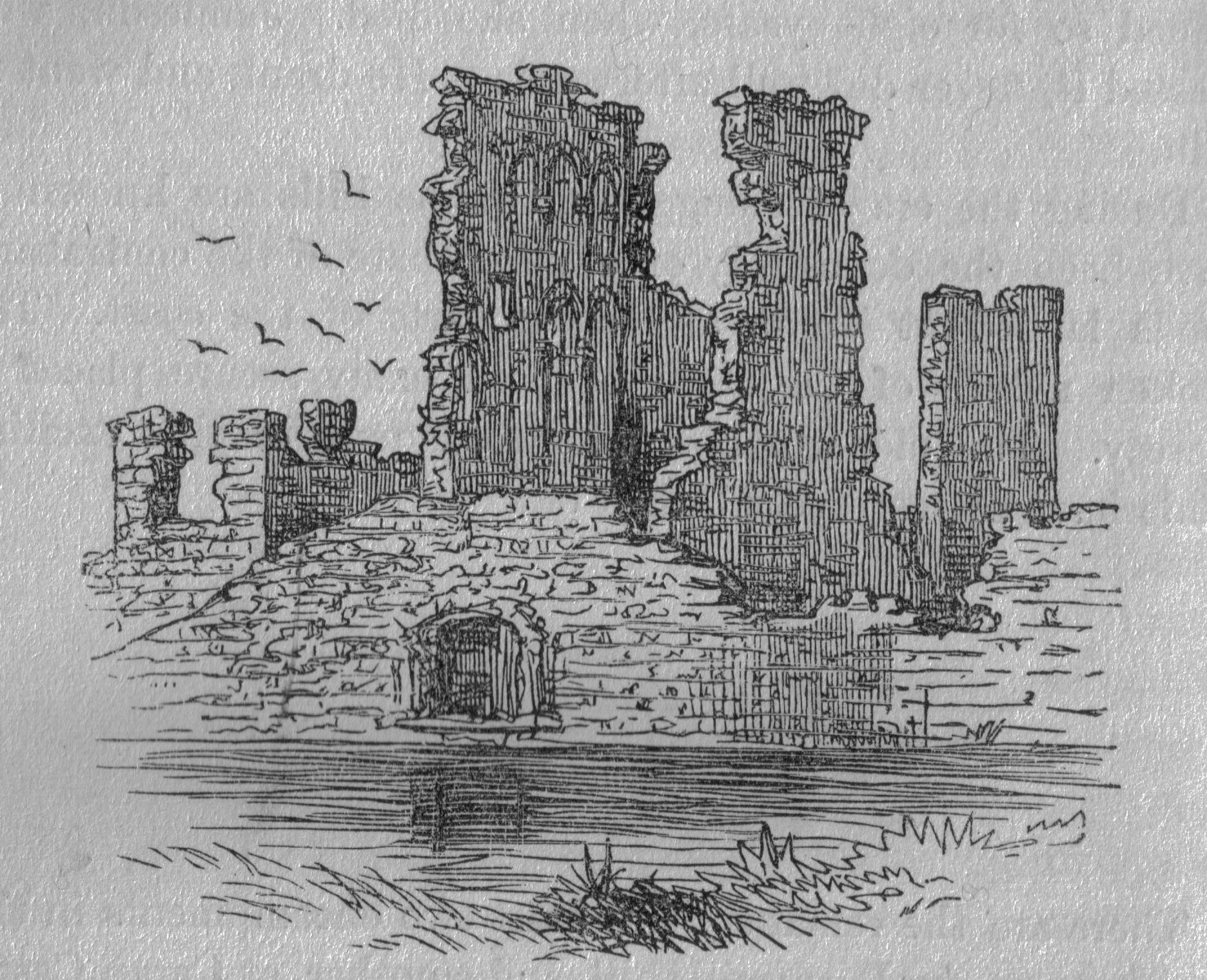
Craigie Castle in the 1860s

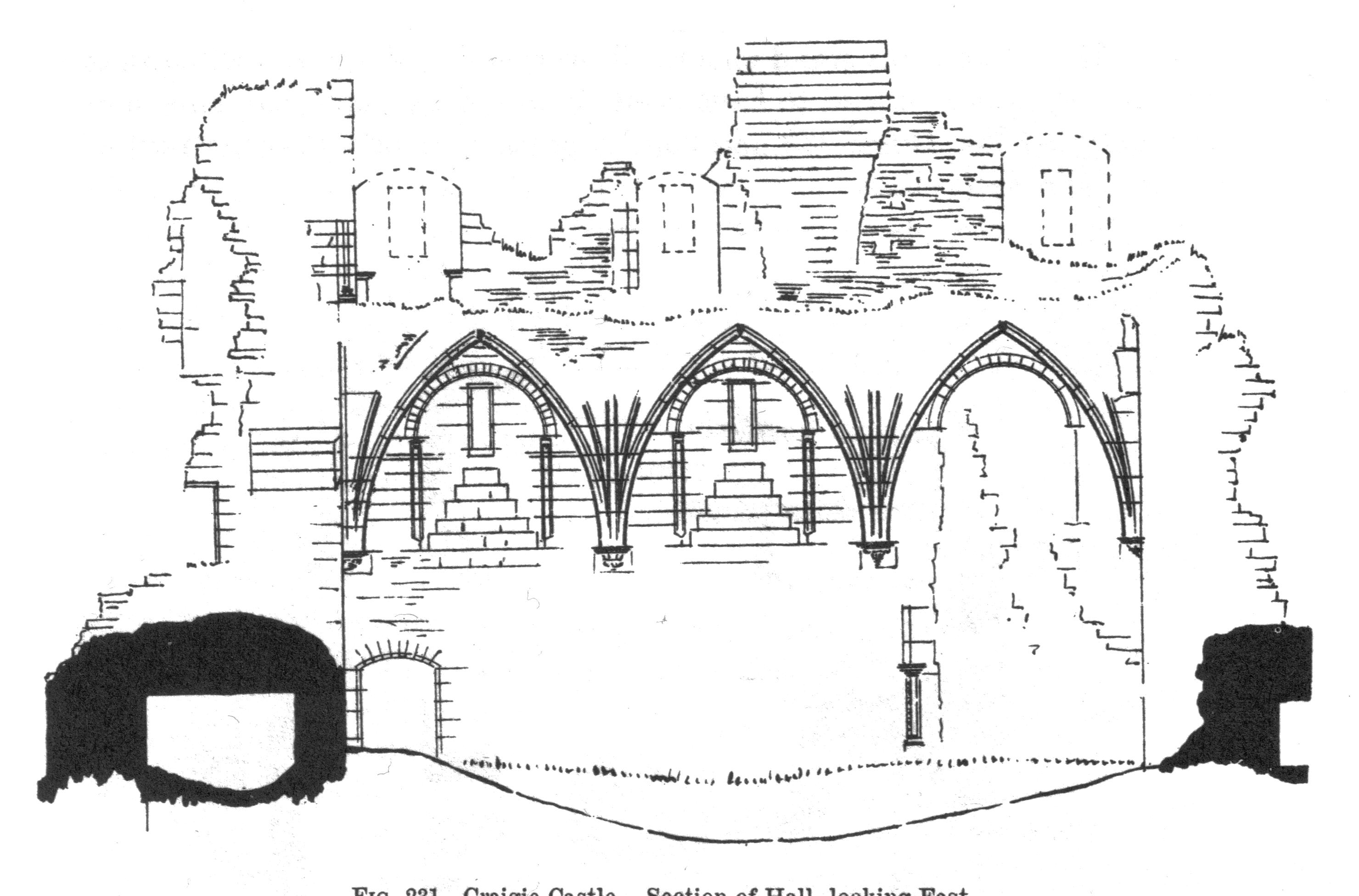
An east view of the Great Hall

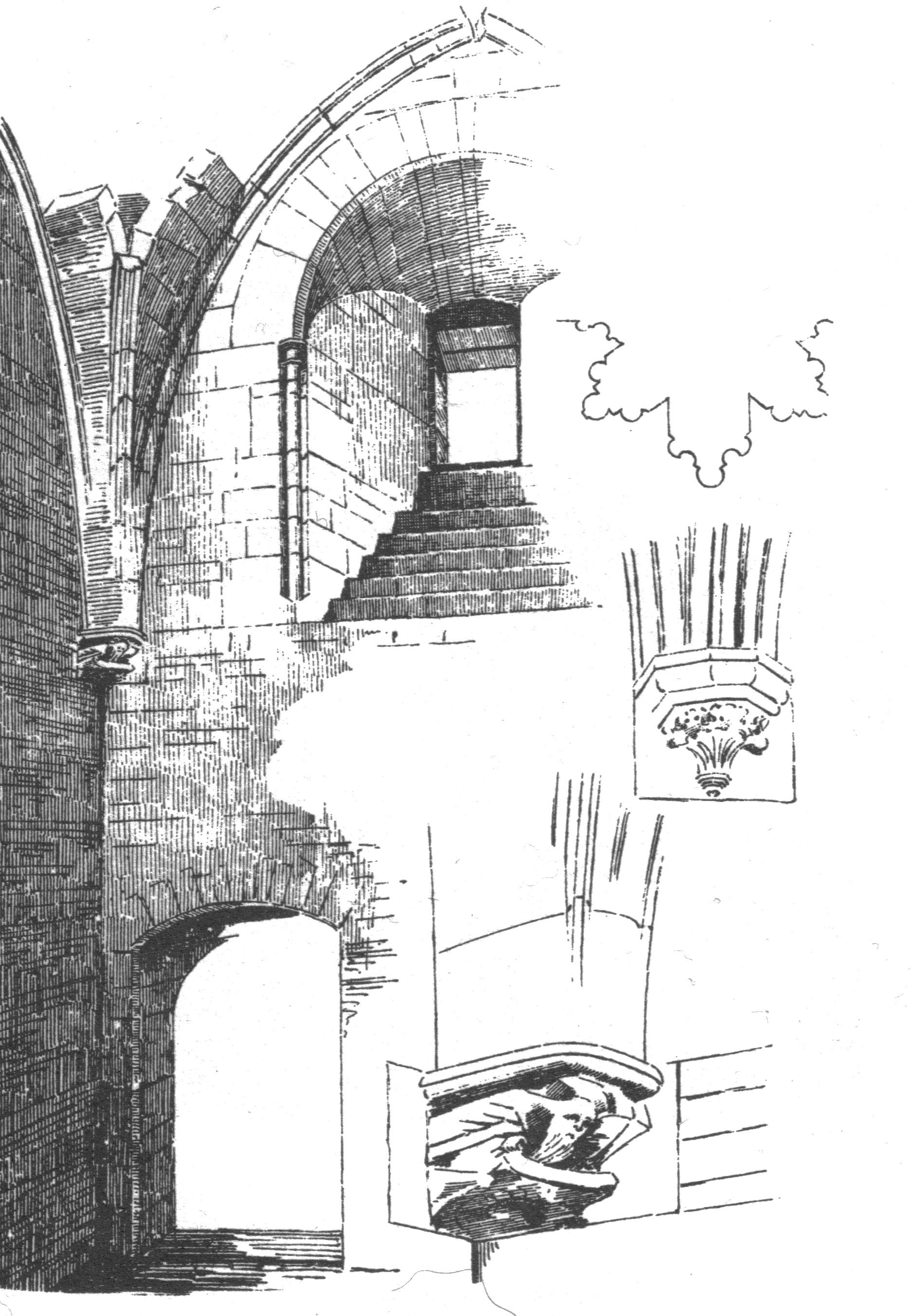
The Great Hall – detail

John Wallace of Riccarton in the reign of David II had a charter of lands of Moorlecere in Forfarshire and was styled 'Wallayis of Richardtoun'. John married the heiress of Lindsay of Craigie circa 1371 and from this date Craigie was the chief residence of the family.

John Wallace was Lieutenant-General to James II, and fought at the Battle of Sark on 23 October 1448, killing the English General Magnus with his own hands. John was injured on the battlefield and died of his wounds at Craigie Castle about three months later.

In the second half of the 15th century the Wallace family had Blind Harry write his poem The Wallace, which recorded the story of Sir William Wallace, albeit 150 years after his death.

An Adam Wallace was Comptroller of the Household of James III in 1468. John Wallace was killed at the Battle of Flodden in 1513; his brother Adam inherited and became oversmen of Prestwick in addition to Bailie of Kyle Stewart. In 1515 he was made alderman of Ayr and controlled the Royal Burgh for a decade.

In 1559 Sir John Wallace accompanied the Earl of Glencairn, the Lords Boyd and Ochiltree, the Sheriff of Ayr, the Laird of Cessnock and others, with a body of 2500 men to Perth in support of the Covenanters or reformers.

Sir William Wallace commanded a cavalry under James VII (James II of England) and went into exile in France with him. He was at the Battle of Killiecrankie and died circa 1700; his brother succeeded to the estates, much impoverished by Sir William's adherence to the Jacobite cause.

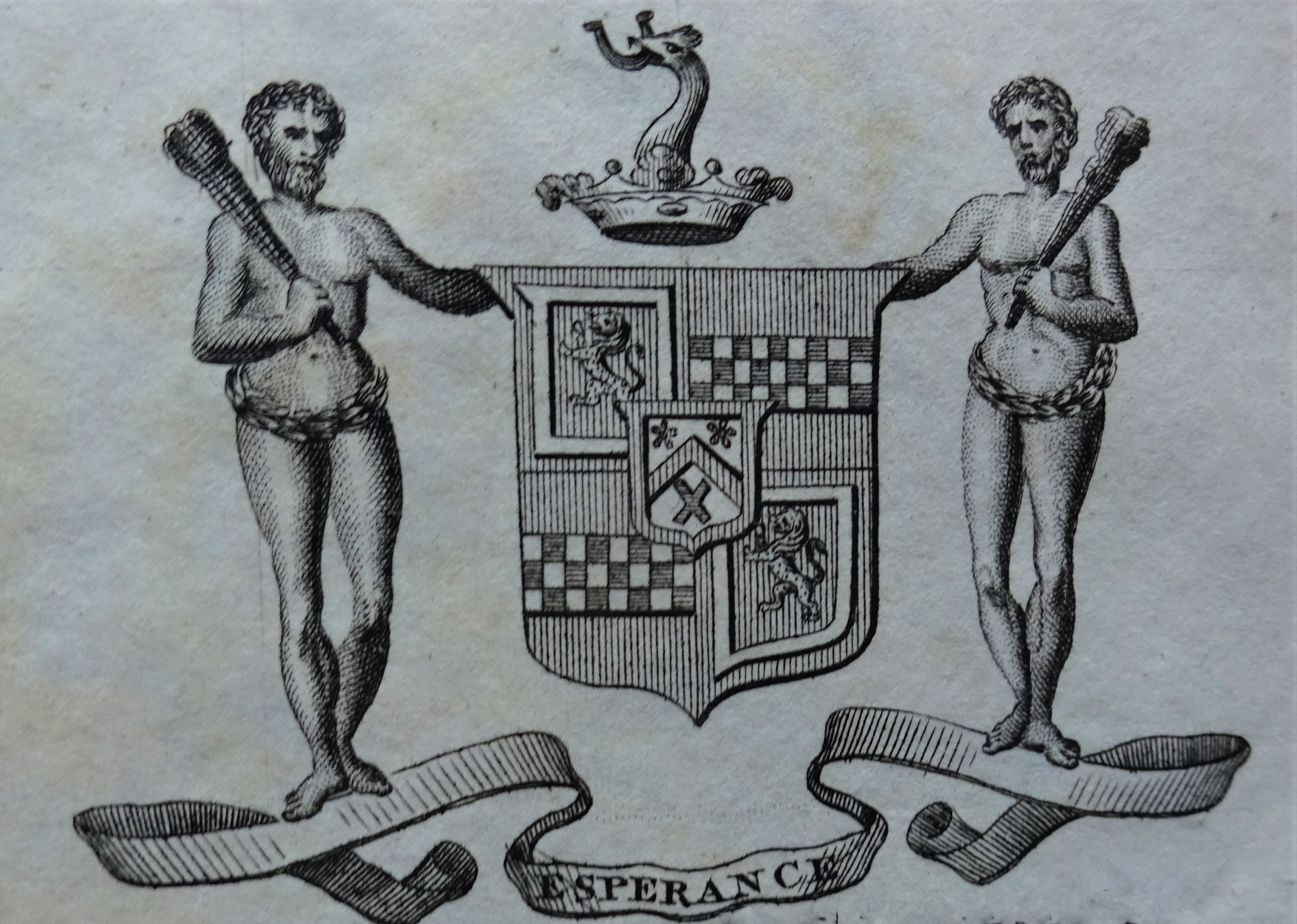
Wallace of Craigie coat of arms and supporters

The Wallaces of Craigie became hereditary Bailies of Kyle Stewart and as such were the chief local representatives of the Crown. In 1489 John Wallace obtained a lease to mine coal near Kingcase in Prestwick.

In 1527 Gilbert Kennedy, 2nd Earl of Cassillis was ambushed and murdered on the sand dunes at Prestwick. Adam Wallace was implicated in this essentially Campbell inspired feud, as his wife, Dame Isabelle, was said to have planned the assassination. The controversy resulted in a loss of prestige and influence.

Sir Hugh Wallace was a supporter of the Royalist cause of Charles I and II, for which his estate was sequestered and only returned when Charles II came to the throne. Sir Hugh had raised a regiment of foot at his own expense, resulting in great debts, sale of lands and in 1626 the disposal of the heritable Kyle bailieship to the Crown for £10,000 Scots. Sir Hugh Wallace, the laird referred to below, was knighted by Charles I and in 1669 Charles II conferred a Baronetcy upon him. All his sons predeceased him and Thomas, a grandnephew inherited. He was most liberal in his ideas, fought with Montrose at the Battle of Philiphaugh and died about 1650.

In 1770 Sir Thomas Wallace died and the baronetcy was inherited by his grandson Thomas Dunlop, who sold off the estate of Craigie in 1783, moved to England and died within three years. He adopted the name Wallace, his mother being Frances Anne Wallace of Dunlop, Sir Thomas's daughter and sole heir; his father was John Dunlop of that Ilk. His son was Major-General Sir John Alexander Wallace who fought in India, Egypt, Spain and France and died in 1857.

The Wallaces married into a number of local aristocratic families, notably the Campbells of Loudoun and the Blairs of Blair. At Blair Castle above a door are the armorial bearings of the Blairs Of Blair and the Wallaces of Craigie, dated 1617. Bryce Blair married Annabel Wallace.

In the 1560s the Wallace family acquired Fail Monastery, however it was later granted to Walter Whytford and passed out of their hands.

=== Coat of arms ===
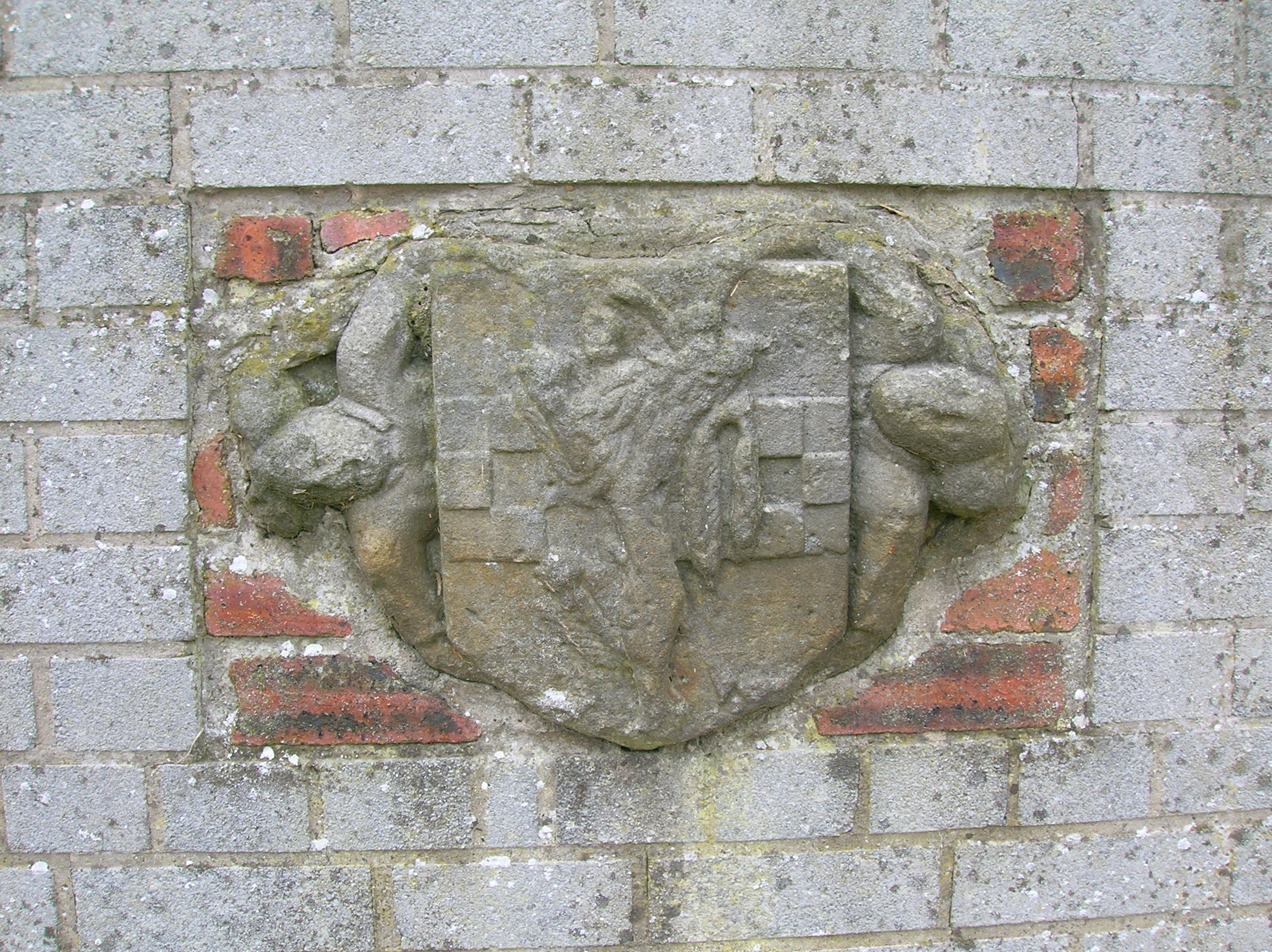
Wallace and Lyndsay Coat of Arms and supporters.

Those of Sir John Alexander Wallace were quarterly : first and fourth, Gules, a Lion rampant, Or, within an Orle; second and third, Gules, a fesse Cheque of three, Argent and Azure. The Supporters were two savages, proper, with Clubs erect. The family crest was an Ostrich neck and head erect, issuing out of an open crown, with a horseshoe in the mouth. The motto was Esperanza, Spanish for 'Hope'.

== The legend of the fall of the Wallaces of Craigie ==
The Lairds of Craigie are said to have cared little for the religious discipline of the presbyterians, and the Laird of Craigie, Sir Hugh Wallace, allowed his tenants or servants to work on Sundays, and he himself traveled openly upon the Sabbath day. The other local ministers of the places involved wrote to the Laird's local minister, Mr. Inglish, about such open and scandalous breaches of the Sabbath.

The Laird ignored the ministers' advice and when in church he actually threw his sword at the minister, the sword sticking in the wood at the back of the pulpit. The minister recovered and told the Laird that God will reduce your great stone house to a pile of stones and no one will be able to repair it; and your son, of whom you have great hopes, will die a fool. Before long the castle was in need of repair, and when the stonemasons started work a great part of it fell down and had almost buried them all. The story may have a grain of truth as Sir Hugh, as stated, was an ardent supporter of the episcopalian sentiments of Charles I and II and was no friend of the Presbyterians.

== Craigie House ==
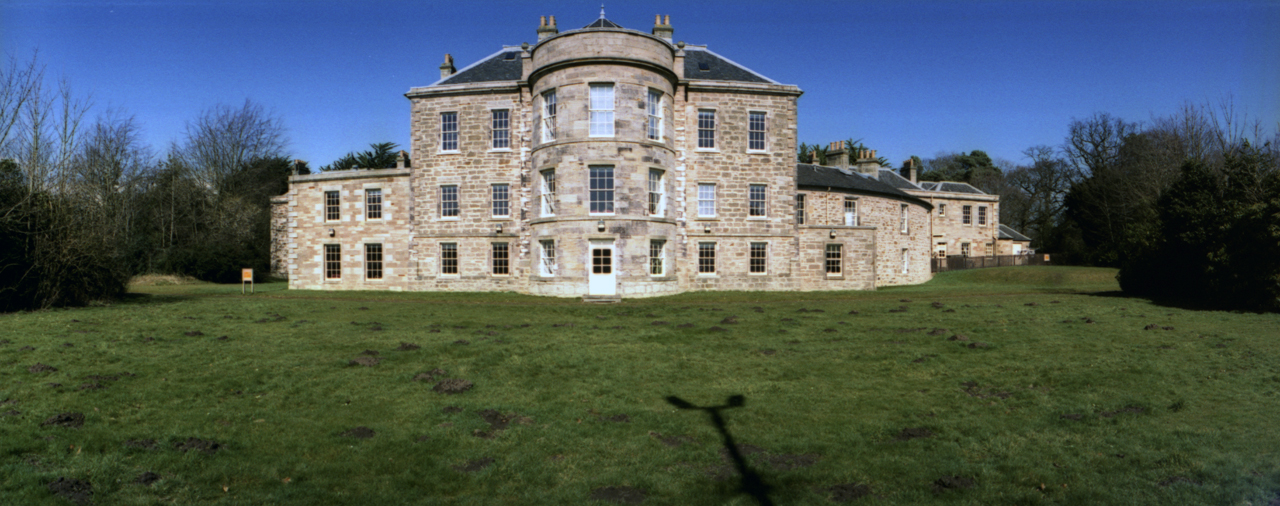
Craigie House

Mrs. Frances Dunlop of Dunlop, Patron and correspondent of Robert Burns. She was the daughter and sole heiress to Sir Thomas Wallace of Craigie.

In the 1730s, Craigie House (NGR NS 34970 21386) in Ayr was built as a replacement residence for Sir Thomas Wallace of Newton-on-Ayr Castle, the fifth baronet; nothing of Newton Castle, previously known as Sanquhar, now remains. In 1783 William Campbell, who made his fortune in India, purchased the principal portion of the Craigie estate. His brother, Richard Campbell of Craigie inherited the estate in 1823 and the property remained in the Campbell family for a number of generations. The family included lawyers and politicians, one being the Member for the Ayr Burghs.

Craigie House and estate was purchased from the Campbell family by Ayr Town Council in 1940. The gardens that run from the centre of Ayr northeast alongside the River Ayr are open to the public free of charge, however the house is used as offices for the University of the West of Scotland and various building works are proposed for the gardens area.

== Newton-on-Ayr Castle or Sanquhar Castle ==
The Wallaces constructed this castle, previously known as Sanquhar, circa the 15th century, however James V granted it to Sir William Hamilton, Provost of Ayr in 1539. William Hamilton of Sanquhar became a favourite of Regent Arran and Captain of Edinburgh Castle. His daughter Isobel married George Seton, 7th Lord Seton in August 1550 and the wedding feast was held at Edinburgh Castle. Inventories of Newton Sanquhar castle mention the fine carved furniture made in the "most courtly manner" that Hamilton had installed.

John Wallace of Craigie with forty others forcefully regained the castle in 1559 but were compelled to return it to the Hamiltons. It was returned to John Wallace of Burnbank, but was then occupied in 1587 by James Stewart, Earl of Arran, now called "James Stewart of Sanquhar", his brother Harry Stewart, and his wife Elizabeth Stewart, Lady Lovat.

In 1598 the Wallaces confirmed their ownership and moved in shortly after. The castle was severely damaged in a storm in 1701 and was finally demolished in the second half of the 18th century. Nothing of the tower now remains.

== Micro-history ==
The Eglinton Hunt regularly visited Craigie's hill, cover, knowes and glens in the 1900s. A kill resulted in a meal for the dogs and the bushy tail presented to the first lady.

The small loch below the manse was used as the curling pond in the 1900s; the curling house ruins are still standing (2009).

In 1584 William Wallace of Ellerslie held the lands of Mains of Helentoun and Bogend, together with the tower, fortalice, and manor place of Helenton, together with half of the mill.

== See also ==
- Auchans, Ayrshire, a Wallace castle
- Earlston, East Ayrshire
