= Pow Burn =

River in South Ayrshire, Scotland

Coordinates: 55°30′35″N 4°34′23″W

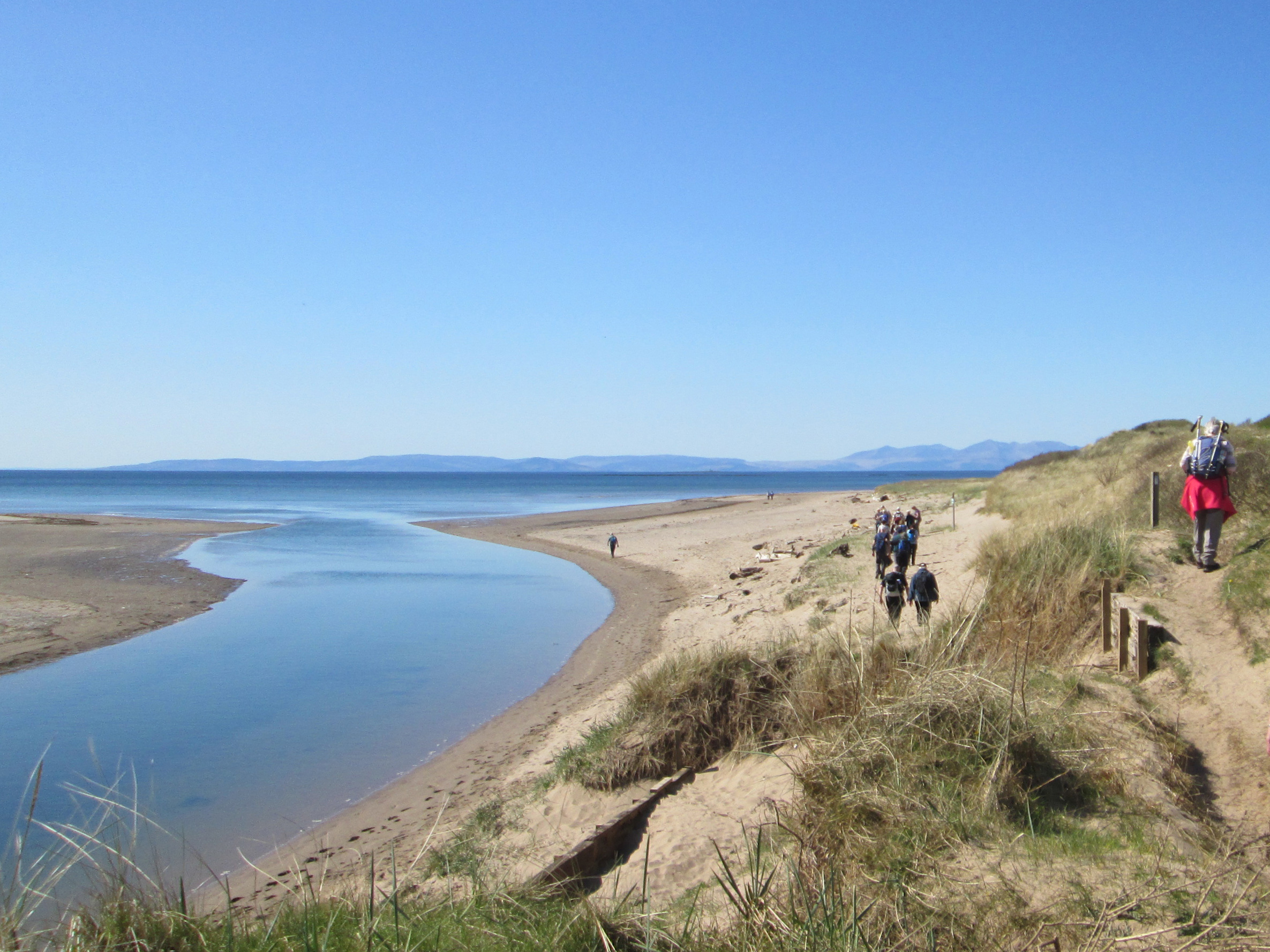
The Ayrshire Coastal Path at the estuary where the Pow Burn reaches the Firth of Clyde.

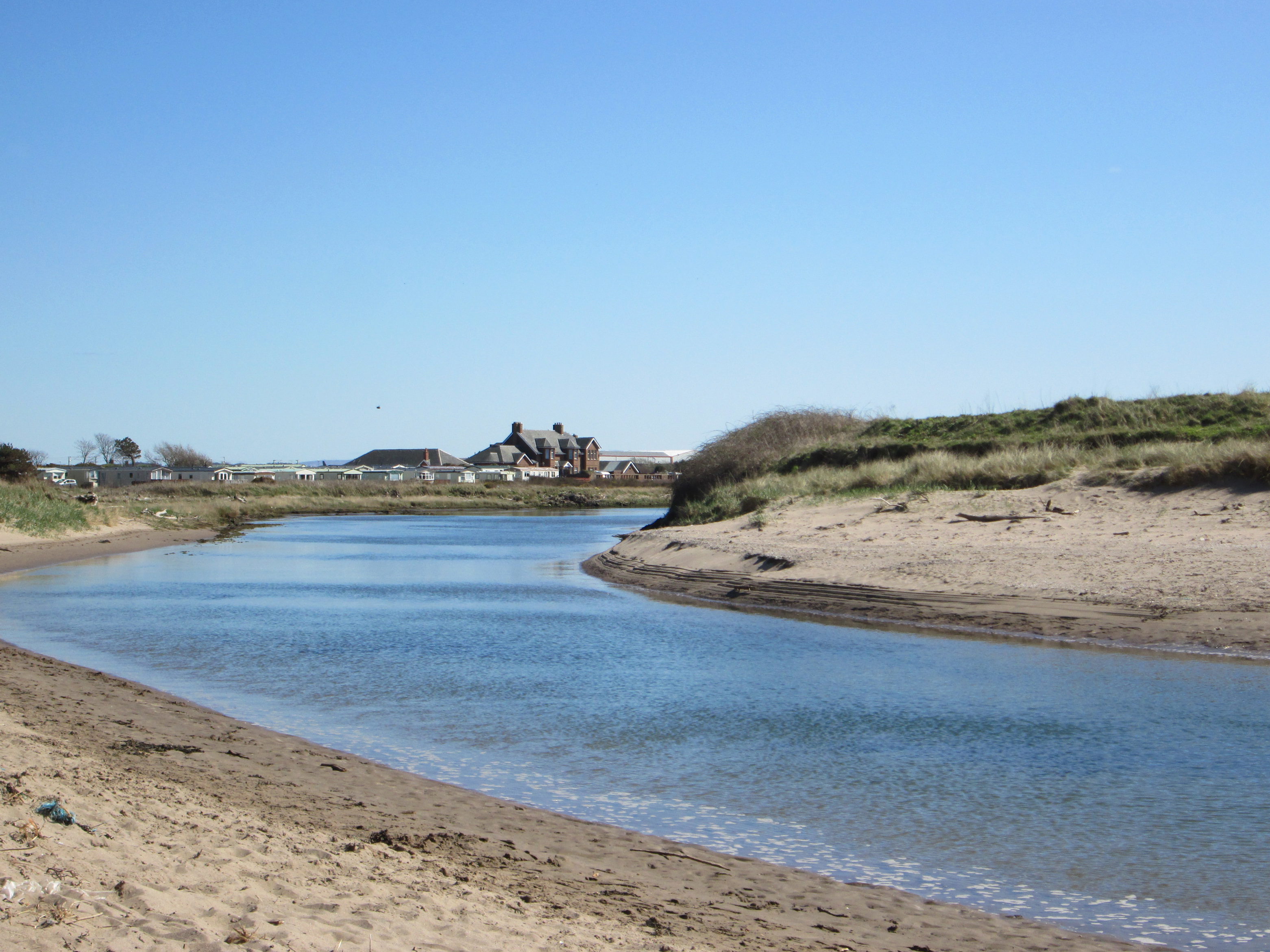
Looking upriver from the estuary, with a caravan park visible across the Pow Burn.

Pow Burn, a name used in Scotland for small watercourses, is a long burn located in South Ayrshire, Scotland. The name "Pow" or "Poll" refers to a slow-moving ditch-like stream.

== Location ==
The Pow Burn is fed by a small loch near the estate of Coodham and is narrow until it reaches Prestwick, where it starts to widen. The Burn separates Prestwick and Monkton. It crosses Prestwick Airport and flows through Prestwick Golf Course, where is serves as a natural obstacle. Prestwick Holiday Park overlooks the mouth of the burn, where it flows into the Firth of Clyde.

The Ayrshire Cycle Track, Route 7 and Ayrshire Coastal Path, Route7 cross over the burn by a bridge not far from the estuary.

== Mills ==
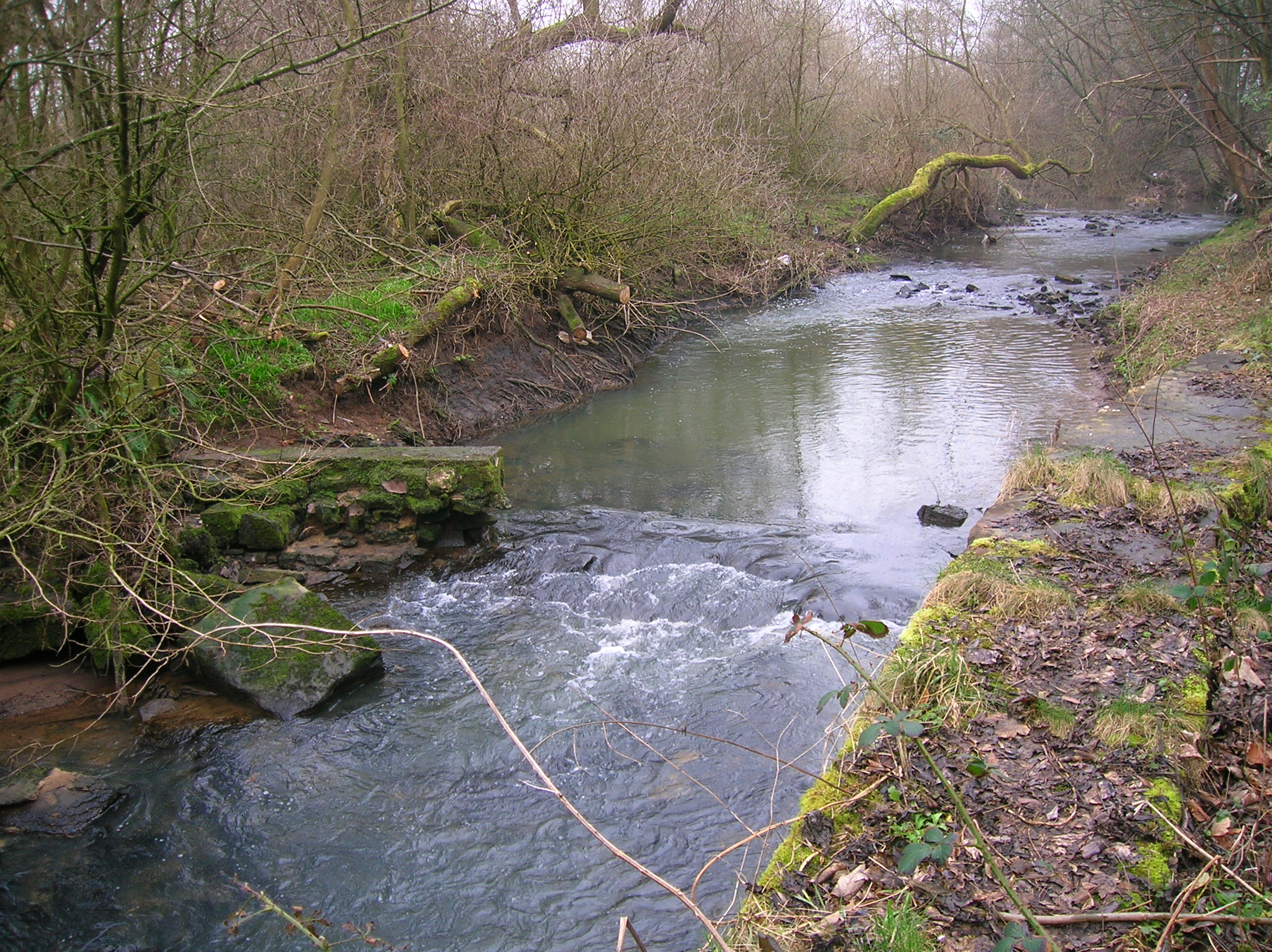
The old dam at Pow or Powbank Mill

At one time there were four mills operating on the Pow Burn. Near the mouth was Prestwick Mill, later called Monkton Mill. Upstream were Powbank, situated near Monkton, Adamton Mill and, ¾ mile east of Symington, Helenton Mill. The small tributary from Barnweil Loch had also the Heugh Mill.

Powbank Mill closed at the outbreak of World War II, when it was requisitioned as a Canteen/Naafi. After the war, the mill never returned to the family, being the home of the Scottish Aviation Club, before they moved into the St Cuthbert's site on Kirk Street.

== Wildlife ==
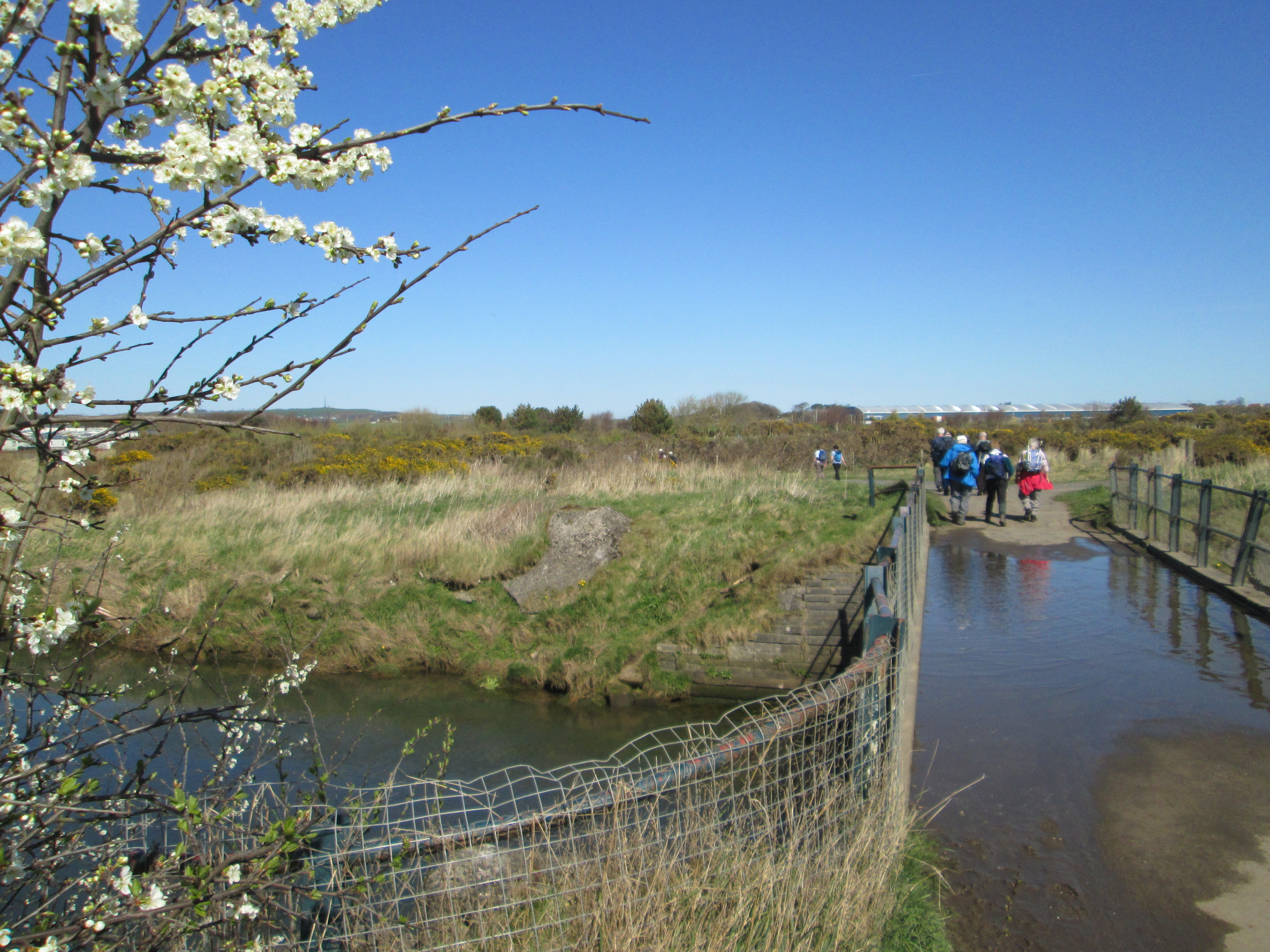
Bushes in flower where the Ayrshire Coastal Path crosses the Pow Burn.

The Burn is one of the last coastal wildlife havens in South Ayrshire. Parts are designated as a Wildlife Corridor and as a Wildlife Site. It has locally rare habitats and nationally rare species.

Plants and animals been sighted at the Pow include otters, red admiral, rare dragonfly species and songbirds such as thrush and nightingale. There has been a decline in the number of waxwings migrating to the area.

The Pow Burn is managed by the local council for conservation and recreation. It provides an area where families can picnic beside the burn and play on the sand dunes west of the burn. The dunes were once a sand quarry.
