= John Strawhorn =

Scottish historian

John Strawhorn (May 1922 – 7 August 1997) was a Scottish educator and historian. He was a teacher in Girvan, Newmilns, Kilmarnock, Cumnock and Ayr, and retired in 1982 as Assistant Rector at Ayr Academy. Along with William Boyd, he wrote the Ayrshire volume of the Third Statistical Account of Scotland in 1951, the first volume to be published. He wrote Ayrshire at the Time of Burns in 1959 and later served as President of the Ayrshire Archaeological and Natural History Society. He specialised in Robert Burns, and also in the history of Mauchline, where he lived from 1961.
