= Agnes Broun =

Mother of Robert Burns

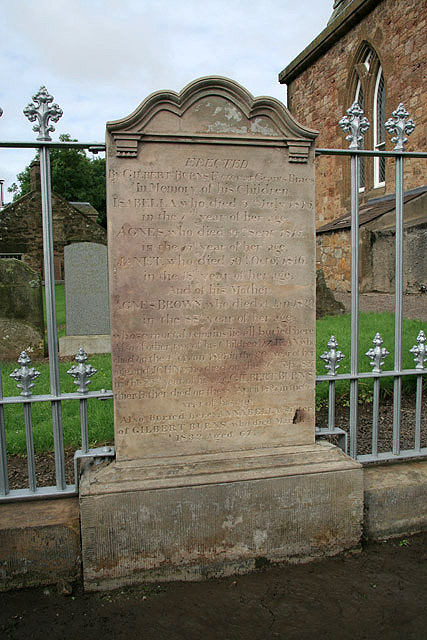
- Agnes Broun's headstone at Bolton Kirkyard
- Born: 17 March 1732; Whitestone Cottage, Culzean, Scotland
- Died: 14 January 1820 (aged 87); Bolton, East Lothian, Scotland
- Known for: Mother of the poet Robert Burns
- Spouse: William Burnes
- Children: 7, including Robert, Gilbert, Agnes, and Isabella

Agnes Broun, Agnes Brown or Agnes Burnes (17 March 1732 – 14 January 1820), was the mother of Scotland's national poet, Robert Burns. Agnes's father, Gilbert (1708–1774), was the tenant of the 300-acre (120 ha) farm of Craigenton, in Kirkoswald parish, South Ayrshire, Scotland.

== Life and character ==
A bed and breakfast called the Whitestone Cottage, on the Culzean estate in Ayrshire, claims to be Agnes Broun's birthplace, however she was christened at Kirkoswald that is close to Craigenton Farm. Both locations are within the Parish of Kirkoswald, Craigenton Farm is approximately half a mile closer as the crow flies to the centre of the village.

Agnes was aged just 10 when her mother, Agnes Rainie (1708–1742), died. As the oldest of six siblings Agnes spent the next two years looking after the family, but in 1744, after her father had found a new wife, she was sent to live in Maybole with Jean Rainie, her maternal grandmother. Agnes's grandmother was a repository of much oral tradition, including Scottish songs and ballads that influenced Agnes and encouraged her to pass them on to her children.

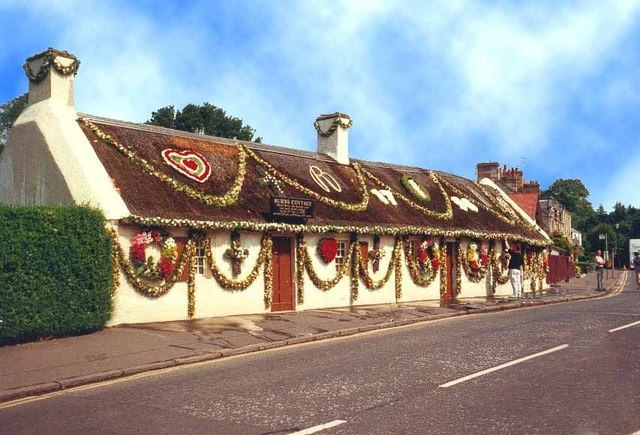
Robert Burns's birthplace at Alloway

Agnes's father Gilbert remarried twice, Margaret Blaine (1718–1751) and then Catherine Mott (1747–1820). Agnes reportedly had no great liking for her stepmothers, the latter of whom was several years her junior and this may explain why Robert Burns had little or no contact with his maternal grandfather.

Agnes attended a dame school held in a weaver's cottage and learned psalms by heart, acquired basic reading skills, but did not learn to write, not even her own name.

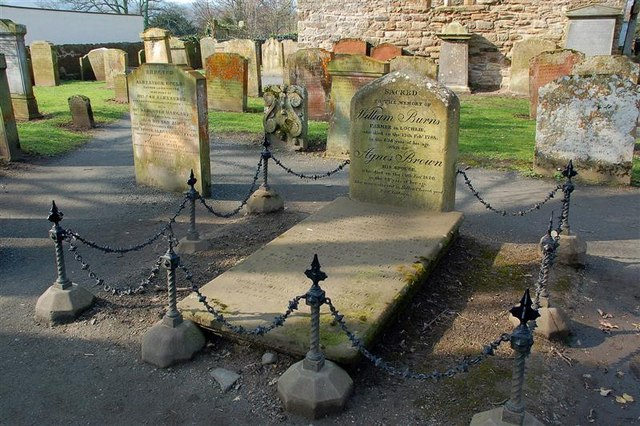
The grave of William Burness or Burnes in Alloway Kirkyard

Agnes was at first engaged to William Nelson, a ploughman, with whom she worked, but she broke off the engagement after seven years, due reportedly to an indiscretion on Nelson's part.

It is thought that Agnes first met William Burnes, 11 years her senior, a market gardener by trade, at the Maybole Fair in 1756. Agnes and William married on 3 December 1757 in Ayr, and settled at Alloway, South Ayrshire, living in a clay cottage that William had both designed and built. At this Alloway cottage they raised four of their seven children, including her eldest son, Robert Burns, who was born on 25 January 1759. The midwife at the birth of Robert was Agnes McClure, wife of the blacksmith John Tennant, and their next-door neighbour. Gilbert was born on 28 September 1760, Agnes on 30 September 1762 and Annabella on 14 November 1764.

In 1767, about a year after moving to Mount Oliphant, Agnes gave birth to William Burnes (b. 30 July), followed by John (b. 10 July 1769) and Isobel or Isobella (b. 27 July 1771). Later homes were at Lochlea, Mossgiel, Dinning and finally at Grant's Braes, Bolton, near Haddington in East Lothian where she died in 1820 aged 87.

Agnes is recorded to have had a major role in cultivating the family's five acres at Alloway's New Gardens, keeping poultry, growing vegetables and making cheeses using milk from her four or so cattle the family kept.

When Agnes's husband William Burnes died aged 62 in 1784 she went to live with her son Gilbert, at Mossgiel, until 1798 and then lived at Dinning in Nithsdale for two years before they moved to Grant's Braes, East Lothian. Agnes died aged 87 and is buried in the churchyard in Bolton Parish Church, Bolton, East Lothian. Agnes and William had seven children, three of whom predeceased her. Of her many grandchildren, at least ten died before her, a reflection of her own old age and the much shorter life expectancies of those times.

According to Robert Burns's youngest sister, Isabella Begg, she “... was rather under the average height; inclined to plumpness, but neat, shapely, and full of energy; having a beautiful pink-and-white complexion, a fine square forehead, pale red hair but dark eyebrows and dark eyes often ablaze with a temper difficult of control. Her disposition was naturally cheerful; her manner, easy and collected; her address, simple and unpresuming; and her judgement uncommonly sound and good. She possessed a fine musical ear, and sang well.” The artist, John Miers, made a silhouette of Agnes, when he was based in Leeds .

Mark Twain wrote of her in The Innocents Abroad (Ch. XXXVI): "It reminds me of what Robert Burns’s mother said when they erected a stately monument to his memory: 'Ah, Robbie, ye asked them for bread and they hae gi'en ye a stane.'"

Agnes's half-sister was Jean Brown (1750–1821) who, in 1775, married James Allan and lived at Old Rome Ford near Gatehead, in East Ayrshire. It was at Old Rome that Robert Burns briefly lodged in the summer of 1786 while avoiding a writ from James Armour in regards to his relationship with Jean Armour. The Allans were the parents of Burns' first cousin, Captain Alexander Allan, who founded the Allan Shipping Line in 1819.

Samuel Peacock, Burns's partner in the flax-dressing business at Irvine, is said to have been a half-brother of Agnes.

== Influence upon Robert Burns ==
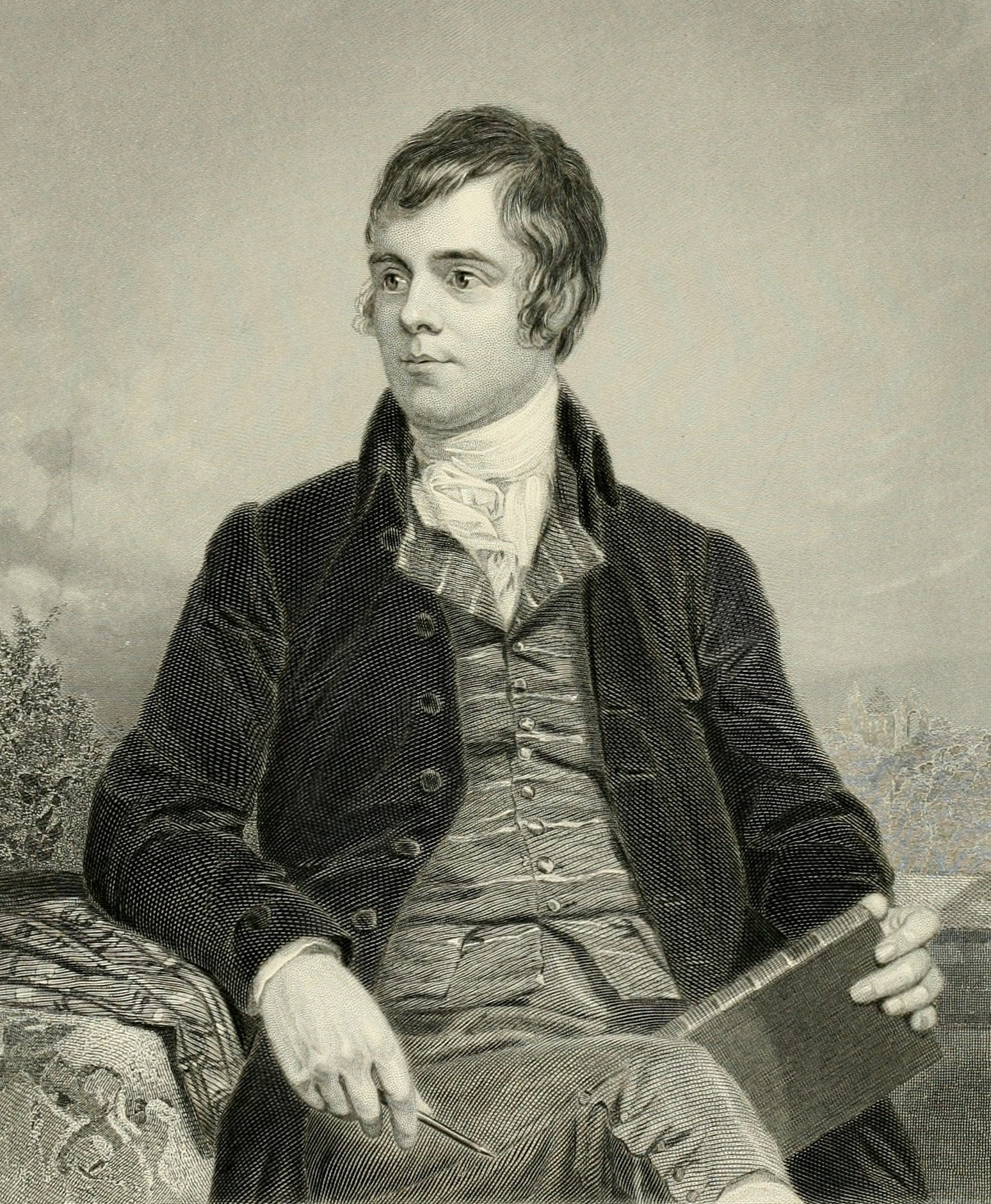
Robert Burns

Agnes is widely known to have entertained her young "Rabbie" with legends from local oral traditions, and folk songs. The biographer Hecht relates that "her sweet singing was heard as she went about the heavy work of the day, for she had a good voice and a wonderful stock of old and new ballads and songs, such as were current amongst the people. ... In the art of story-telling she had a rival in an old linswoman, Betty Davidson, who was frequently a guest in the little household at Alloway."

Agnes is credited with having a significant influence upon Robert Burns's love for song. A relative, Betty Davidson, was an even greater influence. These twin influences resulted in Robert Burns writing or revising nearly 350 songs throughout his life. Most of these songs were published, without fee, in the "Scots Musical Museum" compiled by James Johnson and the "Select Collection of Original Scottish Airs" published by George Thomson.

The following somewhat bawdy song is said to have been her favourite ballad and also that of her son:

"Kissin is the key o love,
An clappin is the lock,
An makin o's the best thing
That e'er a young thing got."

== Memorials and monuments ==
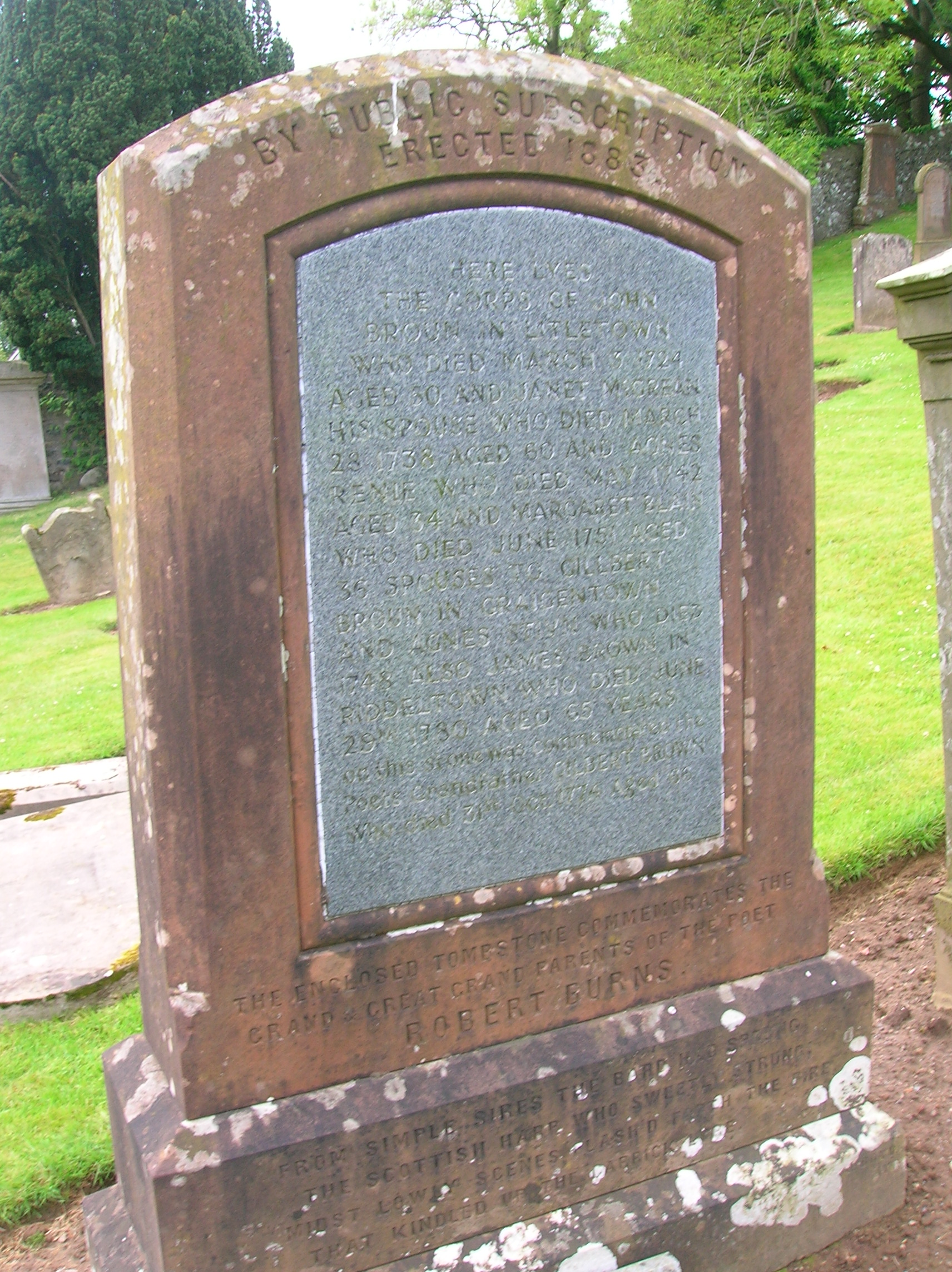
The restored headstone of Agnes' father and grandfather at Kirkoswald

Agnes was buried with her son Gilbert and her daughter Anabella in Bolton Parish Kirkyard within a railed enclosure. The memorial stone was erected by her son Gilbert Burns in memory of his children.

The inscription on her gravestone reads:

"ERECTED By GILBERT BURNS, Factor at Grants Braes, In Memory of his Children ISABELLA, who died 3 July 1815, in the 7th year of her age, AGNES, who died 14th Septr 1815, in the 15th year of her age, JANET, who died 30th Octor 1816 in the 18th year of her age; And of his Mother, AGNES BROWN, who died 14 Janry 1820, in the 88th year of her age; whose mortal remains lie all buried here. Also of other two of his Children VIZ. JEAN, who died on the 4th of Jany 1827, in the 20th year of her age. and JOHN, who died on the 26th Feby 1827, in the 25th year of his age. GILBERT BURNS their Father died on the 8th April 1827 in the 67th year of his age. Also buried here, ANABELLA, sister of GILBERT BURNS, who died March 2."

Gilbert wrote that his mother's funeral would be delayed until he had a mortsafe constructed to protect the grave.

There is a monument to her, called 'Burns's Mother's Well', near Bolton on the roadside from Haddington, East Lothian. According to the Scottish Gazetteer Project, the inscription for the well reads: "Drink of the pure crystals and not only be ye succoured but also refreshed in the mind. Agnes Broun, 1732 - 1820. To the mortal and immortal memory and in noble tribute to her, who not only gave a son to Scotland but to the whole world and whose own doctrines he preached to humanity that we might learn."

In 1932, William Baxter FSA (Scot) restored the well and it lies some 100 yards (91 m) away from the site of one of the Burns's former homes.
