= Old Rome, South Ayrshire =

Coordinates: 55.590561°N 04.553735°W

Old Rome: Rome Ford
- Location within South Ayrshire
- OS grid reference: NS 392 361
- Civil parish: Dundonald
- Council area: South Ayrshire
- Country: Scotland
- Sovereign state: United Kingdom
- Police: Scotland
- Fire: Scottish
- Ambulance: Scottish

The old village or hamlet of Old Rome, Rome or Old Rome Ford is located in South Ayrshire, Parish of Dundonald, Scotland. It is one and a half miles from Crosshouse and one and less than a quarter of a mile from Gatehead. In the 18th and 19th centuries the locality was a busy coal mining district and many of the houses have been demolished. The settlement is situated near the River Irvine.

== Introduction ==
Old Rome, an old colliers' village, pronounced 'Aul Rim', lies across the river from Gatehead on the main A759 road to Kilmarnock, Dundonald & Troon, with the old road to Kilmarnock via Earlston branching off the new Kilmarnock road. The River Irvine forms the boundary with East Ayrshire.

== History ==
=== The village ===
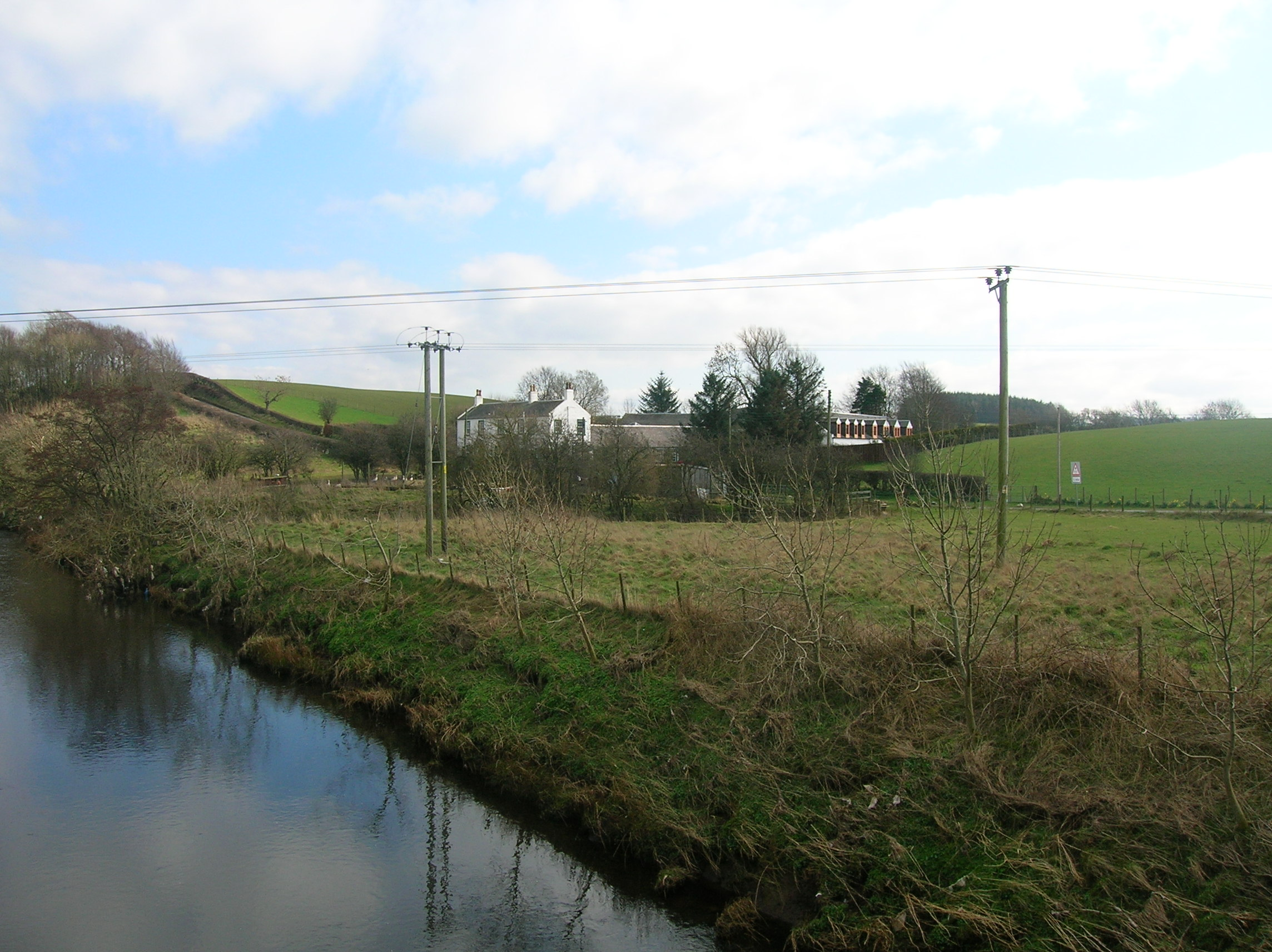
Old Rome from the Old Rome Bridge over the Irvine.

Roy's map of circa 1747 shows several dwellings near Fairlie at the Old Rome site, in 1807 a single row of cottages, growing to two rows by 1860 with garden areas for growing extra food behind them. Archibald Adamson records a walk through the area in 1875. He mentions a neat lodge house at Fairlie, then owned by a Captain Tait and records that the Old Rome Bridge over the Irvine had recently replaced an older one. The Old Rome miners cottages on the East side of the road are stated to be in ruins following the closure of the local coal pits and the distillery ruins were still apparent. He goes on to say that the nearby Gatehead Village was much more recent and was established around fifty years back, i.e. circa 1825, and has neither kirk, smithy, mill or market, but it does have a station.

The hamlet had a 'Mission Station' in 1837, the mother church being Dundonald. A school was once located at Romeford and in 1939 the school house and school survived as dwelling houses. Later the school became the Free Church School. In 1844 it had 90 pupils. The Laird of Fairlie was a generous benefactor and frequent visitor to the Free Church.

In 1793 the population was 74; by 1841 the population was 261, mostly miners, a worker at the distillery, a teacher and even two grocers; the 1851 gives 204 inhabitants with fewer miners and no whisky workers; finally 1881 gives only 31 inhabitants.

In 1852 the Fairlie and Robertland Estate advertised a blacksmith's shop, shoeing shed and large garden for rent. The factor of the estate on behalf of Sir Charles C. Fairlie, John Dunlop, was the contact.

Roads and railways

In Roys map of circa 1747 no ford crossing or road bridge is shown at this point on the river and the Ayr to Kilmarnock Road ran via Fortacres. Ainslie's map of 1821 shows only a possible railway crossing at the river, running down to the coal pits and this may not have been built due to the high cost of a bridge and the extensive railway embankments that would have been needed. The name Rameford indicates a ford even without an established road. In 1828 two crossings are shown at the river at Romford (sic) although one seems to stop at the railway itself and may indicate a planned railway connection yet to be, but never actually built.

A milestone existed at the road end from the former Todrigs Mill near Earlston. This stone was carved with the inscription 'Old Rome 1' and became part of the collection of milestones put together on the Montgreenan estate by Sir James Bell (died 1929).

The ford

The 'Romford' (1828), 'Rameford', 'Room' or 'Rome Ford' was situated upstream from the modern road bridge crossing the River Irvine. 'Room' or 'Rome' in Scots meant a rented small rented farm or croft.

The ford was a dozen or so yards up river from the bridge and until the 19th century the Old Rome farmer could point out the southern side of the ford and the flat stones of the ford substratum can still sometimes be seen. A history of confusing Robert Burns handwriting of 'Forest' and 'Ford' has occurred, but 'ford' is considered more likely.

As stated, both Thomson and Ainslie show a route of or for a railway apparently branching off the main Kilmarnock to Troon line and crossing the Irvine by means of a bridge near to the ford and this branch or mineral line halting near Fairlie House on Thomson's map and carrying on towards Symington on Ainslie's.

The Old Rome Distillery

This was founded by James Fraser in 1812, it had several changes of owner, with James Mill the owner in 1829, however it had probably closed by 1848 and certainly by 1851. In 1826 the name Old Rome Distillery Co is recorded. The distillery with a complex of buildings existed at the south side of the river opposite Old Rome Farm, although no signs of its existence are now visible and it was very ruinous in 1875 when Adamson saw it. The Dick Institute in Kilmarnock has a painting that may be of the ruinous distillery. In around 1867 the local artist John Kelso Hunter mentions that he painted the portrait of John Milne who was a distiller living in Old Rome. For a while it operated as a brewery.

== Fairlie Estate ==
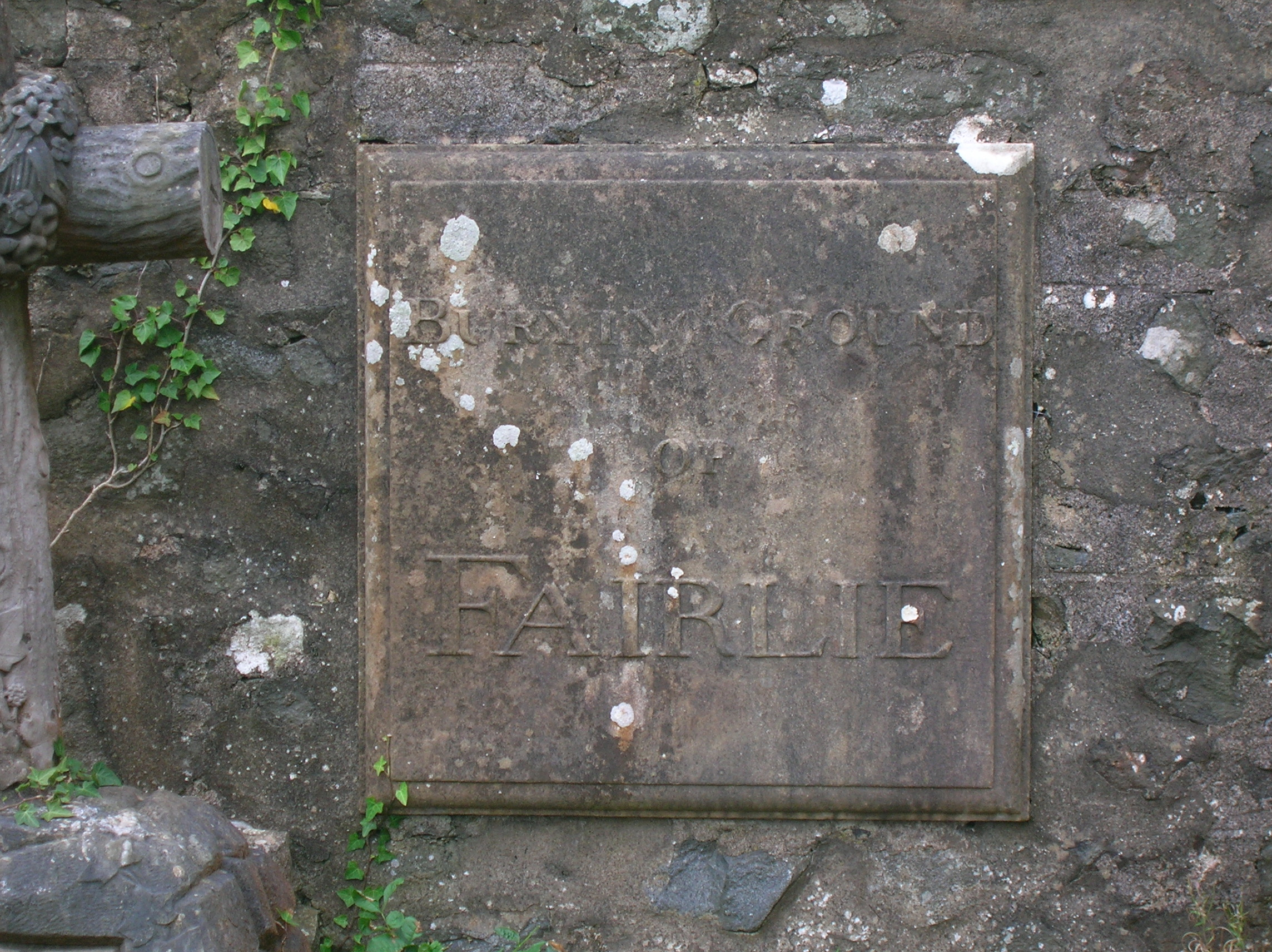
The Fairlie Burial Ground at Dundonald Parish Church.

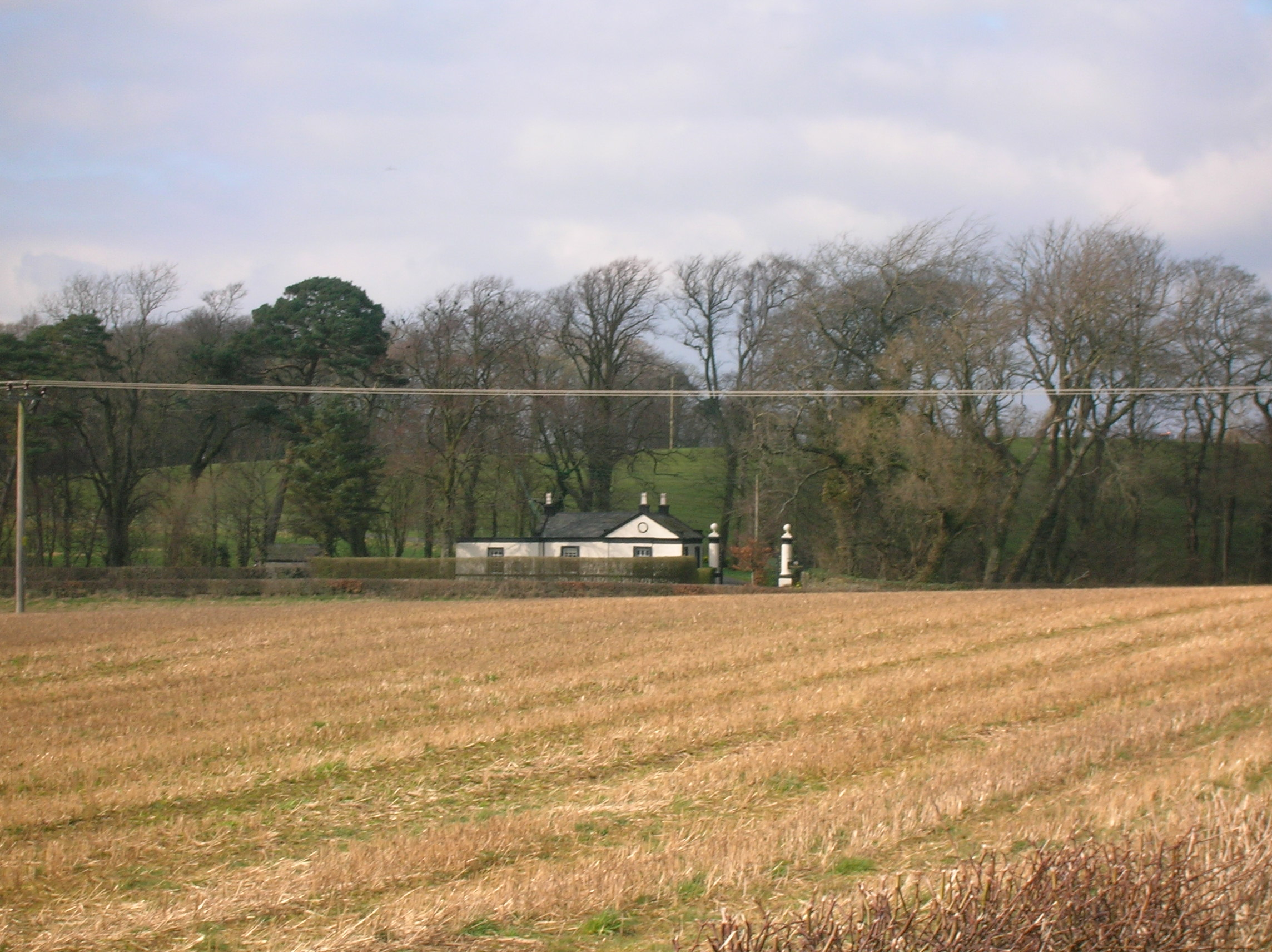
The lodge house and gates at Fairlie House.

Fairlie was locally termed "Fairlie o' the five lums" according to Adamson in 1875, on account of the five large chimneys in a row along the roof ridge of the mansion. Which in more recent times was shortened to "Fairlie Five Lums" by local people. Fairlie had been known as 'Little Dreghorn', until William Fairlie of Bruntsfield gave it his family name in around 1704. Robert Gordon's manuscript map of ca. 1636 – 52 indicates a small mansion at 'Little Drogarn', and it has been suggested by McNaught that the woodland here was locally known as 'Old Rome Forest' at this time. although Boyle does not accept this.

The 'Laird of Fairlie' also owned Arrothill above Old Rome. Sir William Cunninghame of Fairlie and Robertland is recorded by George Robertson in 1823 as living "in a shewy modern mansion", i.e. Fairlie. A mineral spring known as 'Spiers Well' existed near Gatehead in 1789.

At the time of Alexander Fairlie one of his estate workers, Josey Smith, composed the following lines :-

On the green banks of Irvine lives Fairlie of Fairlie,
Who oft speaks of good things, and does them but rarely.
Lord Eglinton's tenants they walk very barely,
Being robbed of their riches by Fairlie of Fairlie.
It's in the low regions, oh! how he will fret,
When there is no farming or farms for to set.
The Devil and him they will scold it right sairly,
And Hell will resound with the shrieks of auld Fairlie.

=== Association with Robert Burns ===
Robert Burns' father William Burnes worked on the Fairlie Estate as a gardener for two years before moving to Alloway.

Old Rome Forest was a house where Jean Brown, Agnes Broun's half-sister and therefore an aunt of Burns, lived with her husband, James Allan who was a carpenter on the Fairlie Estate. When Burns had to go into hiding as a result of James Armour's warrant for his arrest, the poet stayed at his aunt's house, addressing a letter in July 1786 to his friend John Richmond as coming from 'Old Rome Ford'. An advantage also was that the house was not far from where his poems were being printed on John Wilson's press in Kilmarnock. His letter to John Richmond related his plans to emigrate to Jamaica and its even said that he had his packed trunk sent to Old Rome Forest in readiness for his planned departure.

Nothing remains of the Old Rome Forest cottage, but according to Duncan M'Naught, the Kilmaurs schoolmaster and local historian, (in an article in the Burns Chronicle, 1893) the house was on the Fairlie estate and not in the village. McNaught states that Fairlie House was called 'Old Rome Forest' in his day.

Jean Brown

Married in 1775 Jean had four sons and three daughters, one named Fairlie for the estate. James died in 1789 and she moved from the estate cottage to a house in Old Rome itself. James Allan came from Stewarton and was a joiner to trade, employed as a joiner and general mechanic on the Fairlie estate. Jean died aged 69 in 1821 having re-married, her second husband being Adam Baird of Dundonald, however she had no offspring by this second marriage. One of her sons, Sandy or Alexander Allan, went on to found the Allan Shipping Line. The children were educated at the village school and went on to be apprenticed out to trades.

=== Collieries and Coal Pits ===
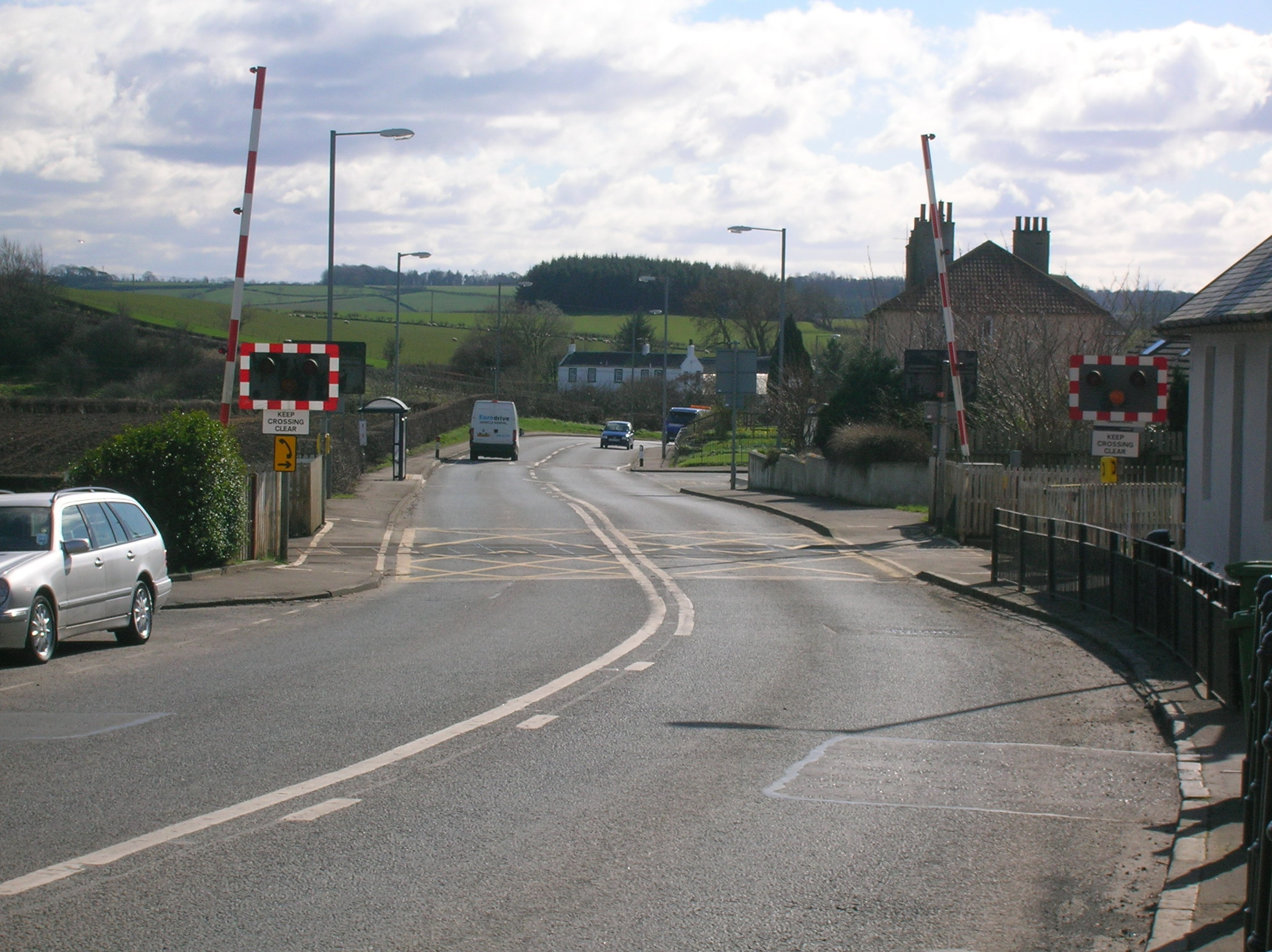
Looking towards the River Irvine, Old Rome and the Fairlie estate.

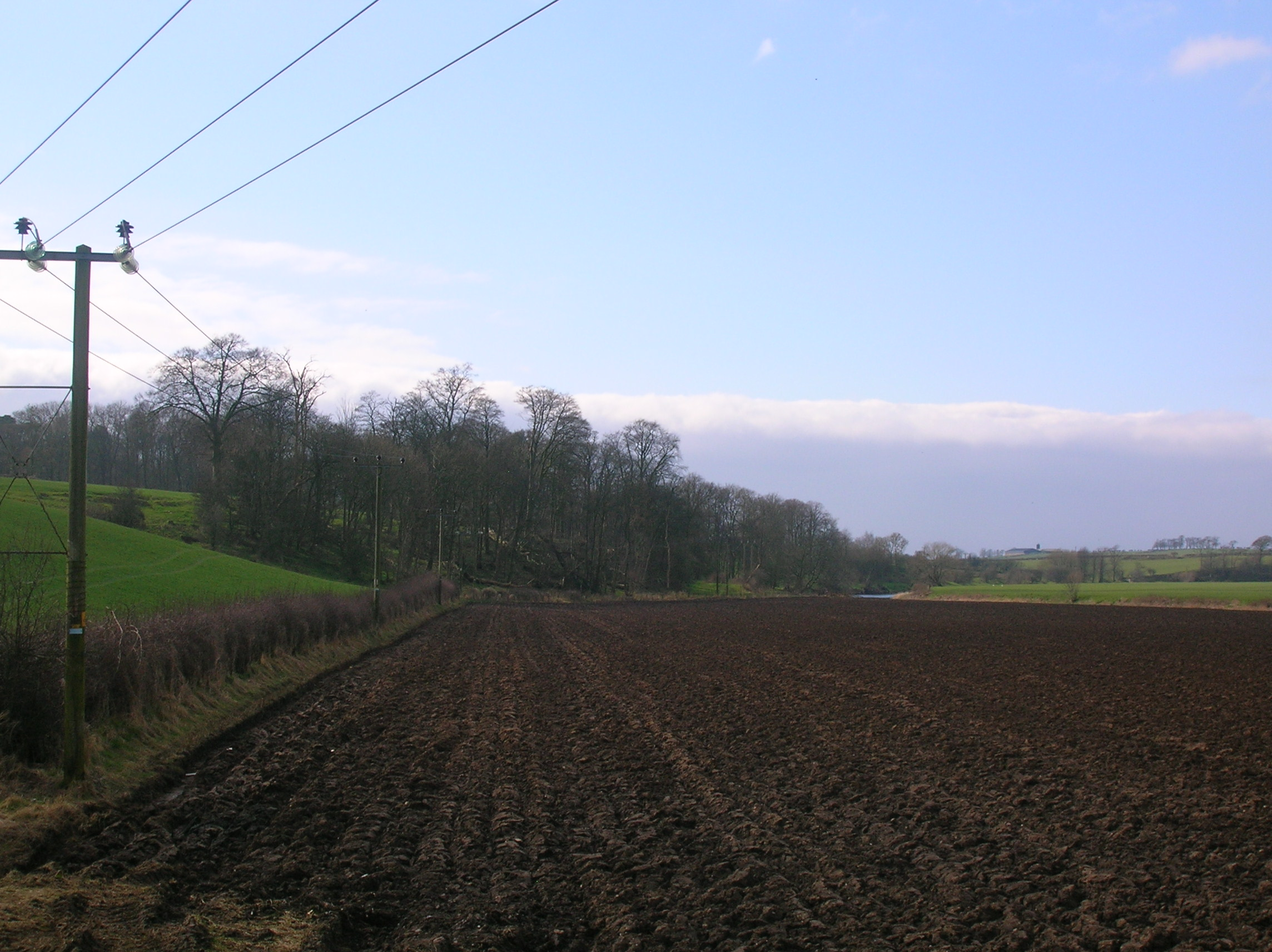
The woodland policies and Fairlieholm from Gatehead.

In the 19th century Coal pits were opened at Fairlie, Peatland, Templeton and Fortacres. The miner's rows were built at Old Rome at this time and a school and schoolhouse was opened, together with a blacksmiths. At first coal was sought where it lay at the surface in the fields, river banks, etc. and only when these were exhausted were bell pits worked. The village of Old Rome existed to provide accommodation for the miners and was abandoned when the coal available by these methods was exhausted. The last coal pits to close were Newfield and Fortacres in 1957. The main pit lay behind the present Old Rome Farm buildings.

A coal pit is marked at Old Rome in 1860, behind the Old Rome Farm, with two miners rows and a school. The school buildings survive as two private houses, being the buildings on the left before the junction for Symington. Although some of the coal was sold locally much of it went to Ireland.

The Old Rome coal pit is mentioned in the novel 'A tree in the West' by Anna Blair, and relates an incident where a young boy is so terrified of being sent down to work in the mine that he runs away instead.

An old collier, Edward Laurie, was in 1852 taken to Glasgow by the Assistamt Inspector of the Dundonald Parochial Board where items were purchased for him that allowed his emigration to America so that the board would be saved the expense of supporting him as a pauper.

=== Farms ===
Old Rome Farm is located on the Earlston road and Arrathill (1860 OS) or Arrothill (1985 OS) farm lies across the river towards Earlston. An Arrathill Mount overlooks Old Rome. Old Rome Farm gained its name upon the abandonment of the village and the tenant James Todd changed its name from Pate's Hole at that time. Pate is the Scots for a fox.

=== Cholera ===
In 1832 an outbreak of Cholera claimed many lives in Kilmaurs and to prevent the entrance of strangers or vagrants, guards were placed at Gatehead, Knockentiber and other places to prevent any communication between the occupants of Kilmaurs and the rest of the community.

=== A Map of the Parish of Kilmaurs ===
The Parish of Kilmaurs in 1912 with Old Rome marked.

== Micro-history ==
An Isabelle Gilfillan's is recorded as being born on 6 March 1811 in Old Rome, marrying a Robert Winters of Kilrea in Ireland on 13 August 1837 at Lanark. She died at Shettleston on 23 Oct. 1889.

== See also ==
- Agnes Broun
- Gatehead, East Ayrshire
- Allan Line Royal Mail Steamers
