= John Richmond (lawyer) =

Scottish lawyer (1765–1846)

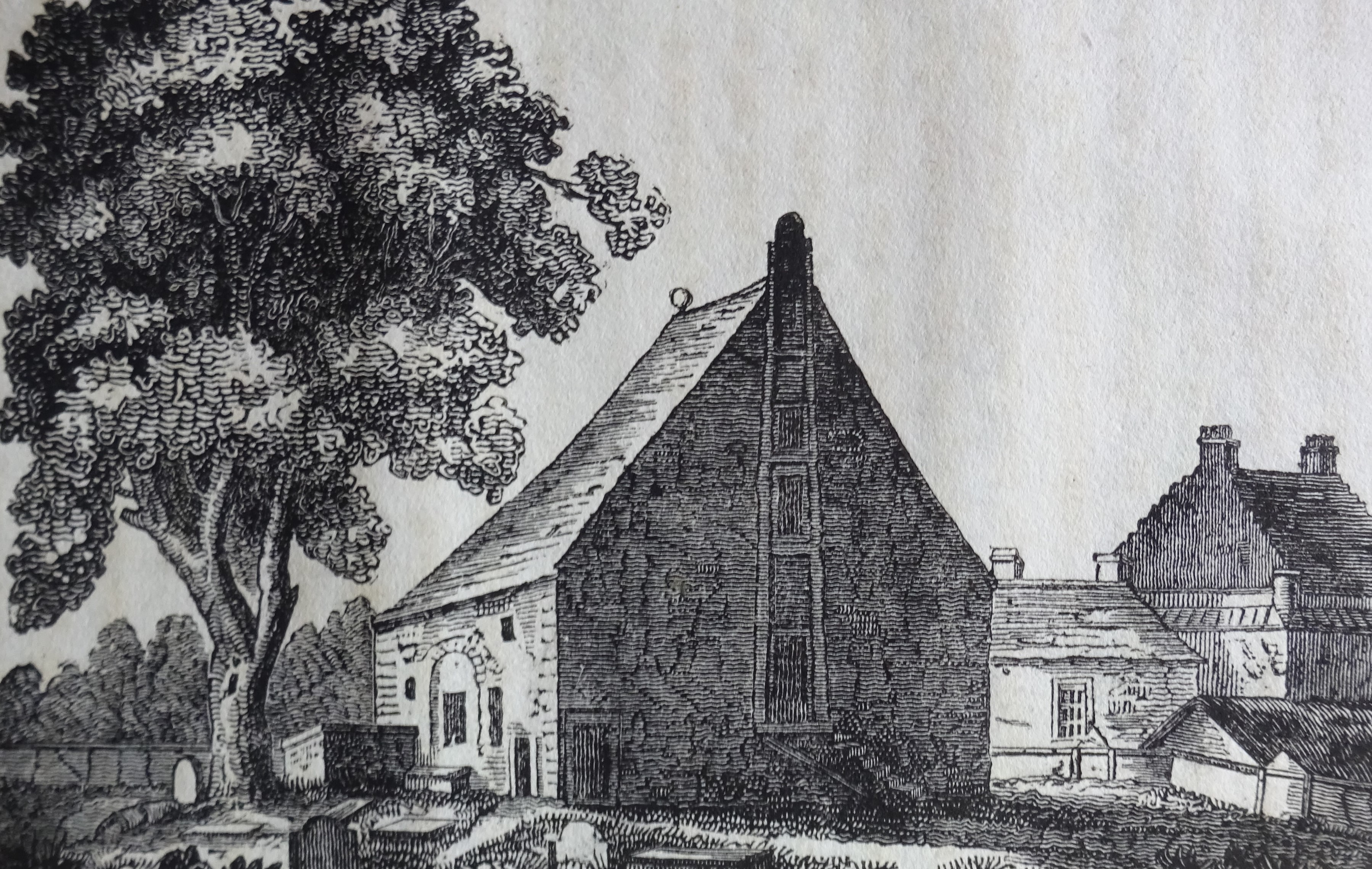
- Mauchline Kirk as it appeared at the time of John Richmond
- Born: 1765; Sorn parish
- Died: 1846; Mauchline, Scotland
- Occupation: Writer or Lawyer

John Richmond (1765–1846) was one of Robert Burns's closest friends and confidants. He was born in Sorn parish at Montgarswood, Ayrshire, Scotland. His father, Henry Richmond, was a merchant in Mauchline and owned Montgarswood Farm that lies near Sorn. This farm passed to James, John's brother, having once been farmed by William Fisher, Burns's Holy Willie.

John eventually became a writer or lawyer in Mauchline after for a time being a clerk working for the lawyer Gavin Hamilton, a good friend of Robert Burns and also for an Edinburgh lawyer, William Wilson.

== Life and character ==
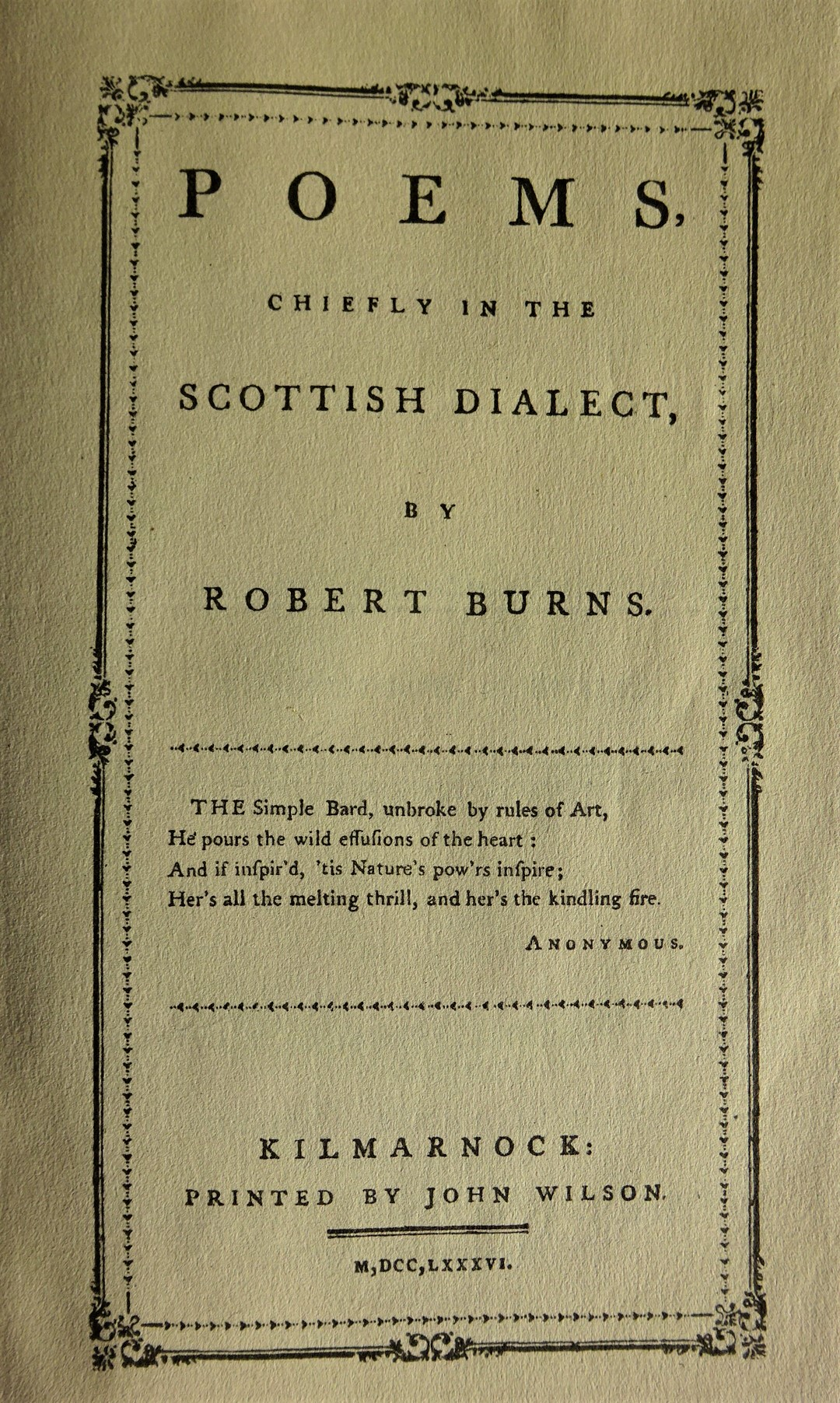
The Kilmarnock Edition of Poems, Chiefly in the Scottish Dialect

John, the younger son, born in Sorn parish, was educated at Newmilns school having been sent to live there with friends of the family. He finally married Jenny or Janet Surgeoner at Netherplace in Mauchline on 5 August 1791, having fathered an illegitimate daughter with her in November 1785. For this sin of fornication John and Jenny had to face the Mauchline kirk session and the congregation in 1785. He abandoned Jenny having taken a job in November 1785 at Edinburgh with William Wilson, a writer to the signet, an act that Burns strongly disapproved of. Richmond was in poor health at one point whilst in Edinburgh as revealed in letter by Burns and he also refers to him as .. "a son of Misfortune. I shall be extremely anxious to hear from you how your health goes on; ..".

After the death of William Wilson in July 1787 he shortly after returned to Mauchline and a letter shows that he was working as a lawyer or writer in the town by 7 September 1787.

John and Jenny lived at No.3, High Street, a house that still stands. Their daughter became Mrs. Alexander who was the source of a story that Robert and Jean were married in the Loudoun Street hostelry of John Ronald, publican and carrier. He died in 1846 aged 82 and was buried in Mauchline churchyard.

After Richmond returned to Mauchline where he worked as a writer and died aged 84.

== Association with Robert Burns ==
Burns is thought to have first met John Richmond in 1784 when he was working at Gavin Hamilton's lawyer's office as a clerk.

Richmond introduced Burns to James Smith and together with William Hunter, a tanner, the four became close friends "Unco pack an' thick thegither" and formed the notorious 'Court of Equity' at the Whitefoord Arms, as described in Burns's "Libel Summons, The Fornicator's Court or The Court of Equity". Burns was the Perpetual President; James Smith the Pocurator Fiscal; William Hunter the Messenger at Arms and Richmond the Clerk of the Court. The court met to debate and discuss the scandals in the village and the punishments that each crime merited. Burns received a mock-summons to stand before the court, the Libel Summons.

Richmond, Smith and Burns would often meet at the end of the day and pay a visit to the reading club at Loudoun Inn, then John Maclelland's Inn; discuss politics and events over an ale at John Dow's or attend the debating society. Burns would on occasions send Richmond poems for him to enjoy and comment on.

Richmond, Smith and Burns are thought to have been in Poosie Nancie's Inn at Mauchline when the scenes of enthusiastic revelry amongst a group who were beggars by day inspired the poet to write his cantata Love and Liberty or The Jolly Beggars. Richmond was the source of the information that early drafts contained three extra characters, viz Racer Jess, a Sailor and a Sootyman.

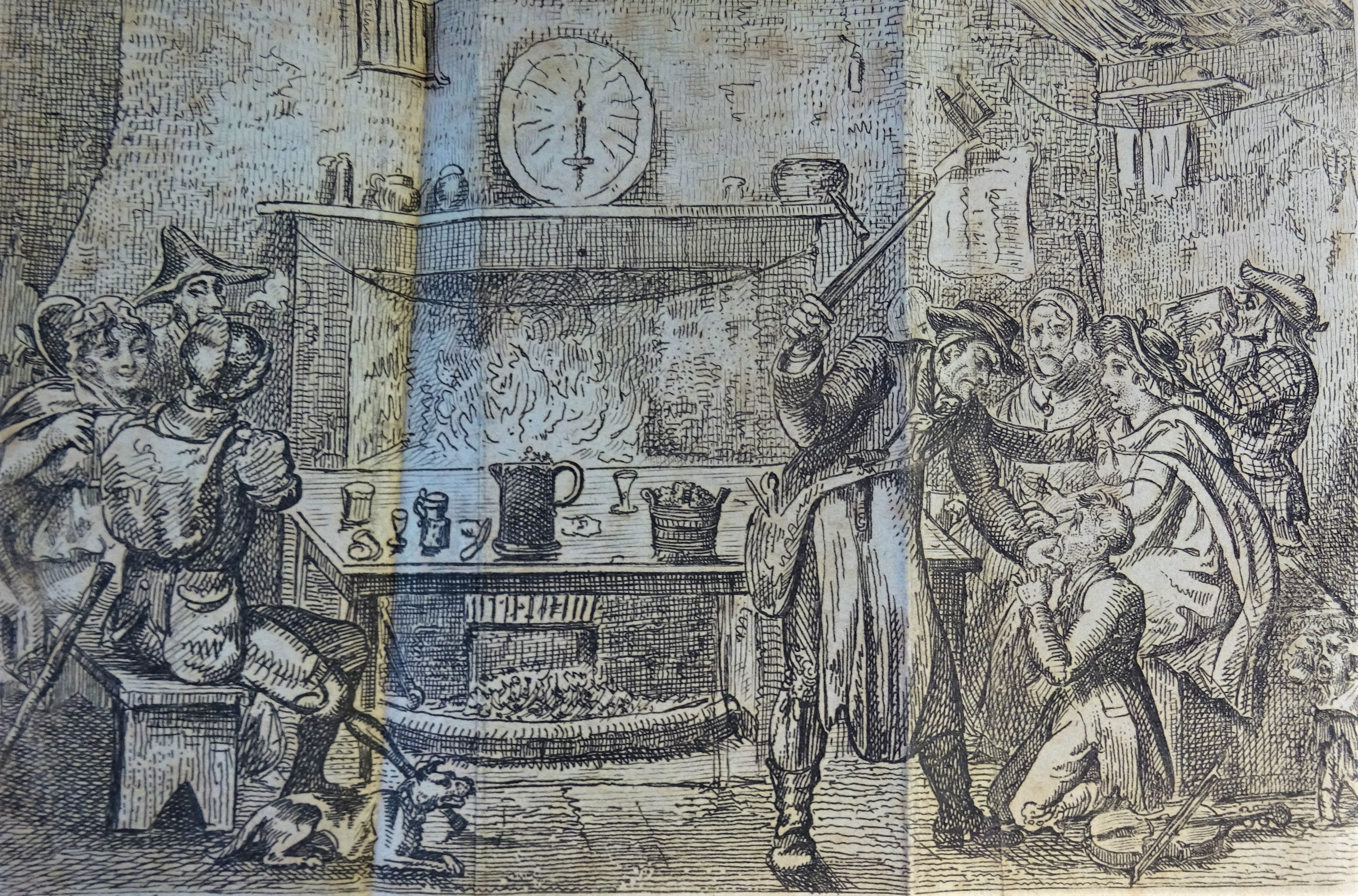
The Jolly Beggars by Isaac Cruikshank

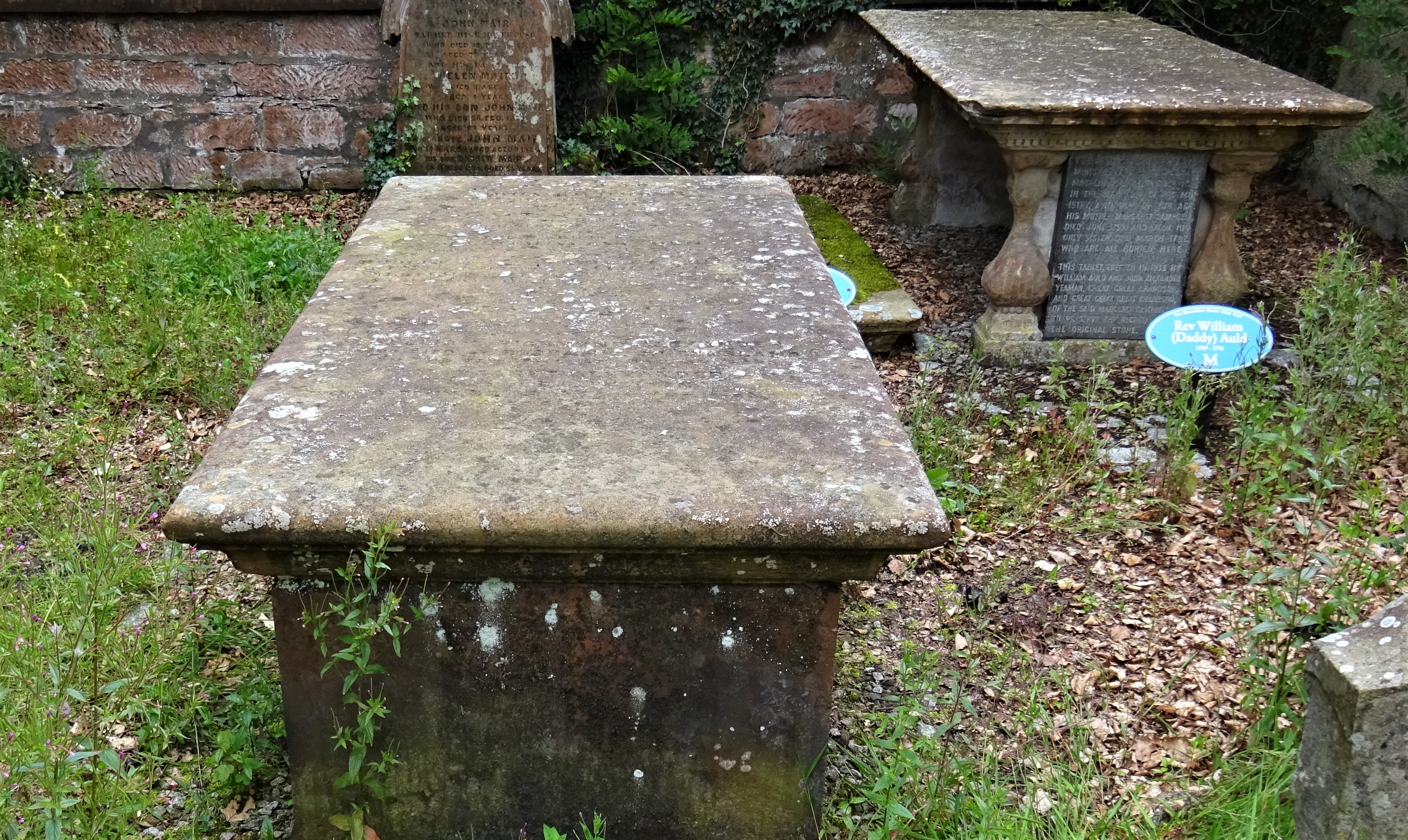
John Richmond's gravestone

Richmond was the source of the story that Address to a Haggis was first recited at the Haggis Club in 1785 at the home of David Shaw, a Kilmarnock Solicitor, who lived at Craigie. The final verse, since modified, belonged to a previous dinner at the home of John Morrison, a Mauchline cabinet-maker. The complete text was printed on 20 December 1786 in the Caledonian Mercury, the first time that a poem by Robert Burns had appeared in a newspaper. Richmond also pointed out that haggis was something of a novelty as a food item at the time.

When on 28 November 1786 Burns first arrived in Edinburgh he had made prior arrangements to share a room with Richmond, his 'Mauchline' friend, in Mrs Carfrae's Baxter's Close flat at the Lawnmarket at 3s a week, up from 2s 6d a week that Richmond had been paying. They shared the rent and had the use of a chaff bed, a sanded floor and a deal table.

When Burns first arrived in Edinburgh he suffered from a headache and stomach complaint to such an extent that he spent much of his time in bed and Richmond would read to him until he fell asleep. Richmond helped Burns transcribe his poems and songs in preparartion for publication.

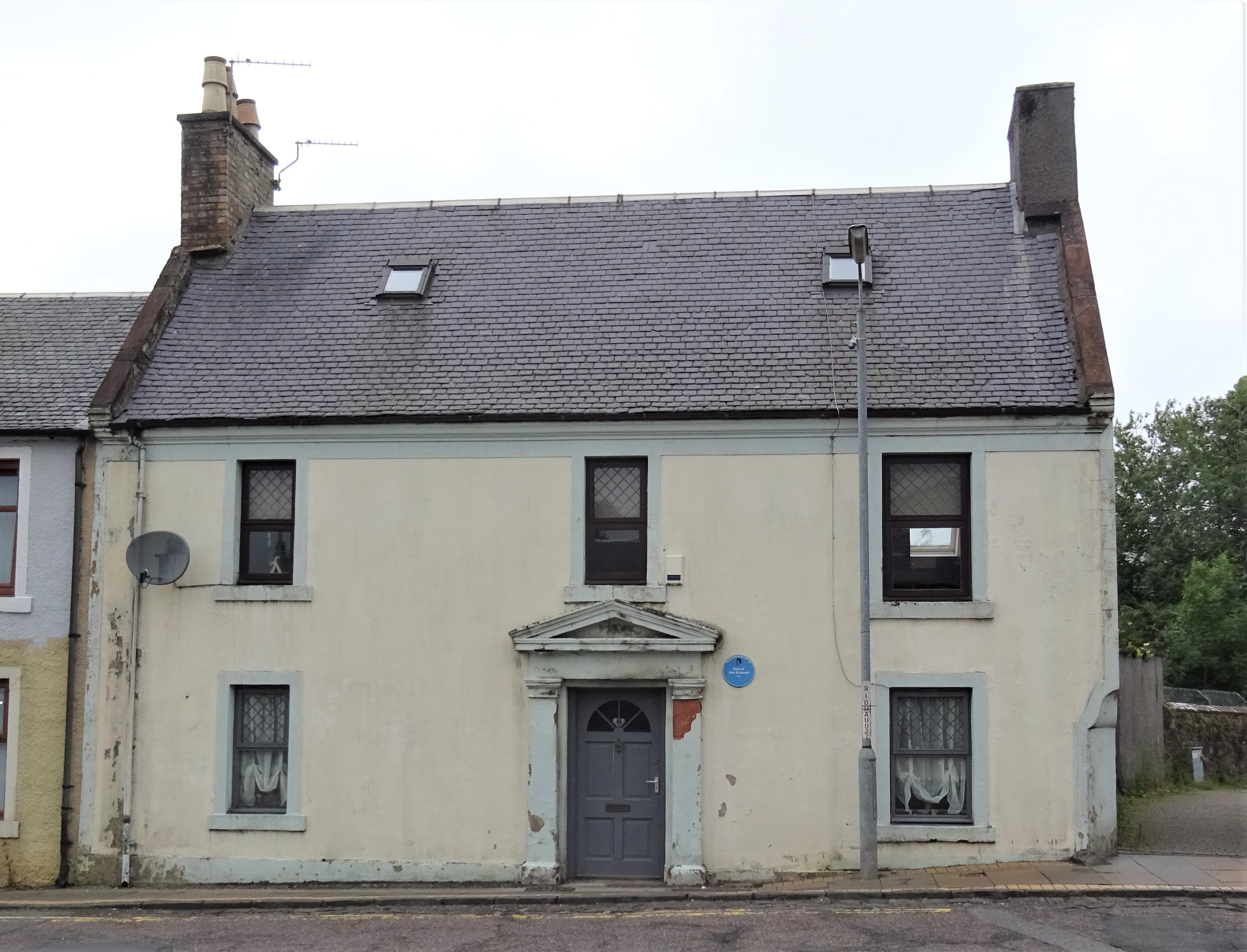
John Richmond's house in Mains Street

Tradition states that Burns and Richmond argued and that Burns left the flat, however two friendly letters around this time suggest otherwise and Burns may simply have moved to better accommodation with William Nicol and at the time he was anyway planning his Highland tour and spending therefore some significant time away from Edinburgh. Richmond stated that for the year that they lodged together Burns kept habits of "strict sobriety".

Richmond wrote an article for the Train Manuscript which recorded how Burns's friends had informed him of Mary Campbell's infidelity with James Montgomerie of Coilsfield House, brother to the Earl of Eglinton.

In December 1817 Richmond was interviewed by Mr. Grierson and related that James Montgomerie and Mary Campbell met frequently in the 'Elbow', a small Mauchline ale house. On one occasion Richmond and some other friends of Burns took him to the 'Elbow' knowing that James and Mary were there together. They waited and eventually Mary exited from a private room, followed a little while later by James. Burns blushed and muttered damn it and suffered much good natured banter. It made no difference and a few days later he returned to her like the dog to its vomit. Unsurprisingly these details of Mary Campbell's behaviour was very unpopular once exposed.

A nephew of Richmond is on record as having said that his uncle was an inveterate liar.

Burns sent Richmond with a copy of his 'Kilmarnock Burns' with the instruction "you must bind it in the neatest manner and never lend it, but keep it for my sake". It is not clear whether he autographed it and considering that he didn't have enough copies even for his own family at Mossgiel it was a generous act of friendship.

Burns presented Richmond with a silver mounted snuffbox made with wood taken from the rafters of the Auld Alloway Kirk. The snuffbox bears the inscription;

"Frae the oak that bare the riggin',
O Alloway's auld haunted biggin',
Frae the thorn aboon the well,
Whaur Mungo's mither hanged hersel'."

This item was presented to the then Municipal Museum at the Edinburgh City Chambers.

=== Correspondence ===
In February 1786 Burns wrote to his friend Richmond saying "My chief patron is Mr Aiken in Ayr who is pleased to express great approbation of my works". He added that "I have some very important news with respect to myself, not the most agreeable, news that I am sure you cannot guess, but I shall give you the particulars another time". He was referring to his intentions of an irregular marriage with Jean that, although enacted, came to nothing. See Gavin Hamilton for the full details.

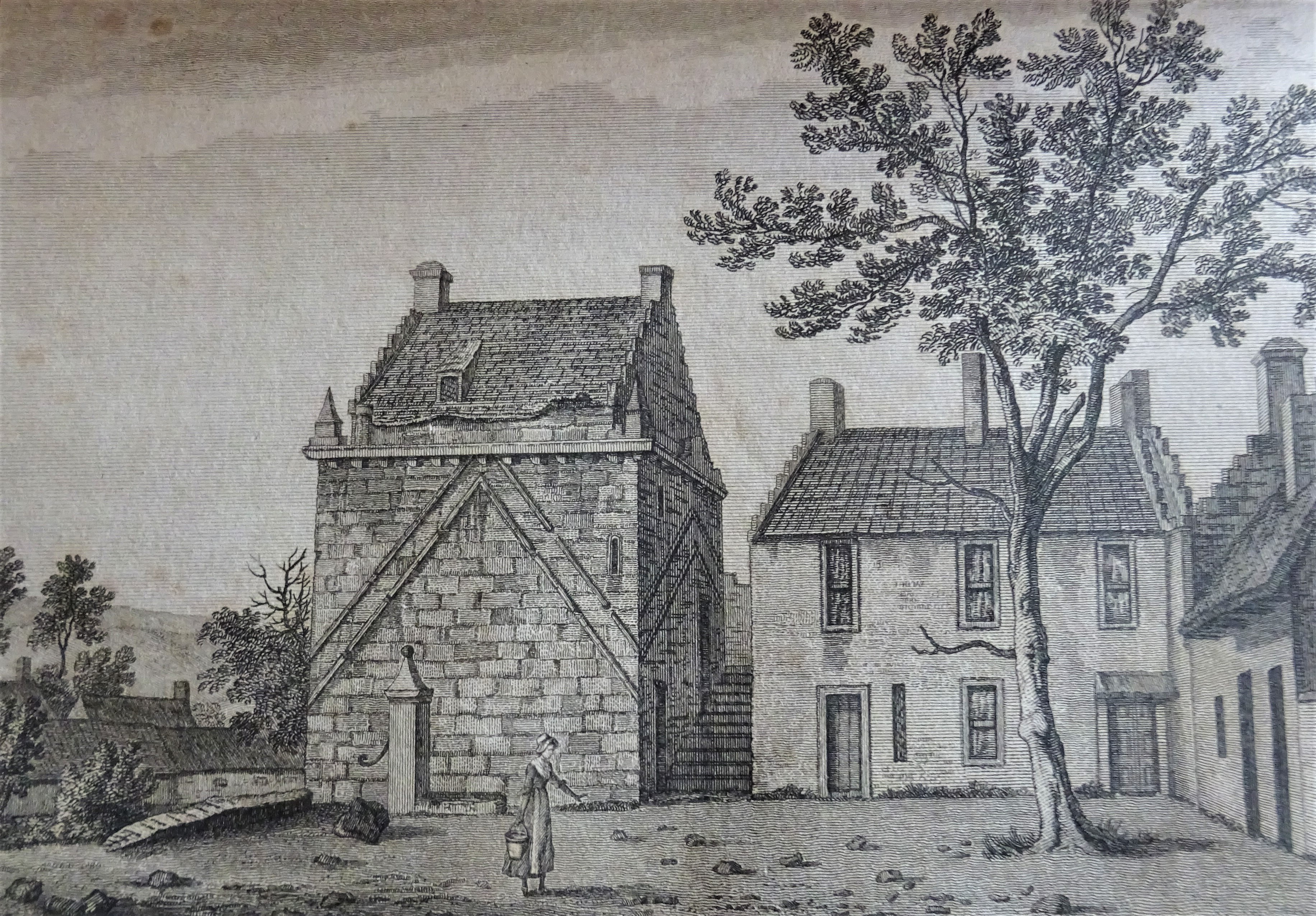
The Abbot's Tower and Gavin Hamilton's house at Mauchline.

On 9 July 1786 he shared with Richmond the news that "I have waited on Armour since her return home, not by -- from any the least view of reconciliation, but merely to ask for her health; and to you I will confess it, from a foolish, hankering fondness very ill-plac'd Indeed. The Mother forbade me the house; nor did Jean shew that penitence might have been expected. However, the Priest, I am inform'd will give me a Certificate as a single man, If I comply with the rules of the Church, which for that very reason I intend to do".

On 30 July 1786 Burns wrote to Richmond from Old Rome Foord where the poet was hiding from the warrant that James Armour had taken out against him in regard of Jean Armour's pregnancy. My hour is now come. You and I will never meet in Britain more. --., have orders within three weeks at farthest to repair aboard the Nancy, Captain Smith from Clyde, to Jamaica, and to call at Antigua. This, except to our friend Smith, whom God long preserve, Is a secret about Mauchline. Would you believe it? Armour has got a warrant to throw me in jail till I find security or an enormous sum".

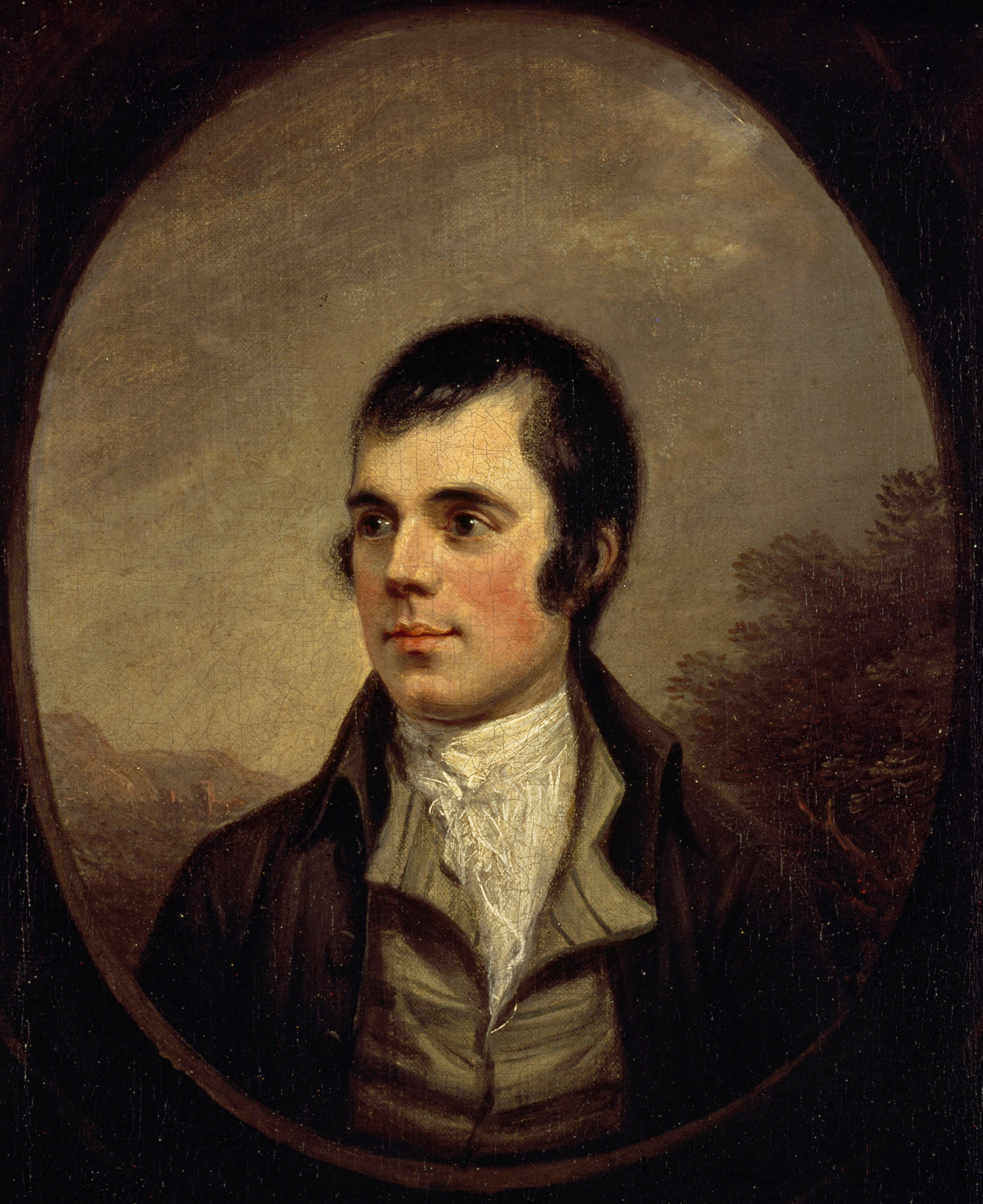
Full view of the Naysmith portrait of 1787, Scottish National Portrait Gallery

On 1 September 1786 Burns expressed his displeasure at the way that Richmond had treated Jenny saying "I saw Jenny Surgeoner of late, and she complains bitterly against you. You are acting very wrong, My friend; her happiness or misery is bound up in your affection or unkindness. Poor girl! She told me with tears in her eyes that had been at great pains since she went to Paisley, learning to write better; just on purpose to be able to correspond with you; and had promised herself great pleasure in your letters. Richmond, I know you to be a man of honour, but this conduct of yours to a poor girl who distractedly loves you, and whom you have ruined, forgive me, my friend, when I say it is highly inconsistent with manly INTEGRITY that I know your bosom glows with".

By 1 September Burns also wrote that he felt that the warrant for his arrest would not be acted upon and that having missed 'The Nancy' he would take 'The Bell' to Jamaica, a ship whose master was Captain Cathcart.

Jean Armour gave birth to twins on 3 September 1786 and Burns wrote to Richmond saying "Wish me luck, dear Richmond! Armour has just brought me a fine boy and girl at one throw. God bless the little dears!"

Burns, on the 27 September 1786 wrote that "I am going perhaps to try a second edition of my book. If I do, it will detain me a little longer in the country; if not, I shall be gone as soon as harvest is over".

7 February 1787 saw Burns writing from Edinburgh commenting that "I have not got, nor will not for some time, get the better of my bruised knee; but I have laid aside my crutches. A lame Poet is unlucky; lame verses is an every day circumstance. I saw Smith lately' hale and hearty as formerly. I have heard melancholy enough accounts of Jean; 'tis an unlucky affair".

7 July 1787 saw Burns writing that "I have lately been rambling over by Dumbarton and Inverary, and running a drunken race on the side of Loch Lomond with a Wild Highlandman; his horse, which had never known the ornaments of iron or leather, zigzagged across before my old spavin'd hunter, whose name is Jenny Geddes, and down came the Highlandman, horse and all, and down came Jenny and my Bardship; so I have got such a skinful of bruises and wounds, that I shall at least be four weeks before I dare venture on my journey to Edinburgh".

On 25 October 1787 Burns wrote a somewhat strangely worded letter to Richmond at Mauchline, back home during the long summer recess, from Edinburgh saying "I long much to hear from you, how you are, what are your views and how your little girl comes on. By the way, I hear I am a girl out of pocket and by careless, murdering mischance too, which has provoked me and vexed me a great deal. I beg you will write me by post immediately on receipt of this, and let know the news of Armour's family, if the world begin to talk of Jean's appearance any way". He was concerned that Jean's second pregnancy would create a new round of difficulties with her parents.

Richmond's daughter recollected that she used strips of Burns's letters as markers in her school books.

A letter of October 1787 is still extant from John Lapraik showing that Richmond assisted Lapraik with gaining subscribers for the publication of his book of poems.

== See also ==
- Robert Aiken
- Jean Armour
- Lesley Baillie
- John Ballantine
- Alison Begbie
- Nelly Blair
- Isabella Burns
- May Cameron
- Mary Campbell (Highland Mary)
- Jenny Clow
- Gavin Hamilton (lawyer)
- Helen Hyslop
- Nelly Kilpatrick
- Jessie Lewars
- Anne Rankine
- Isabella Steven
- Peggy Thompson
- James Smith (draper)
- John Murdoch (teacher)
