= John Murdoch (teacher) =

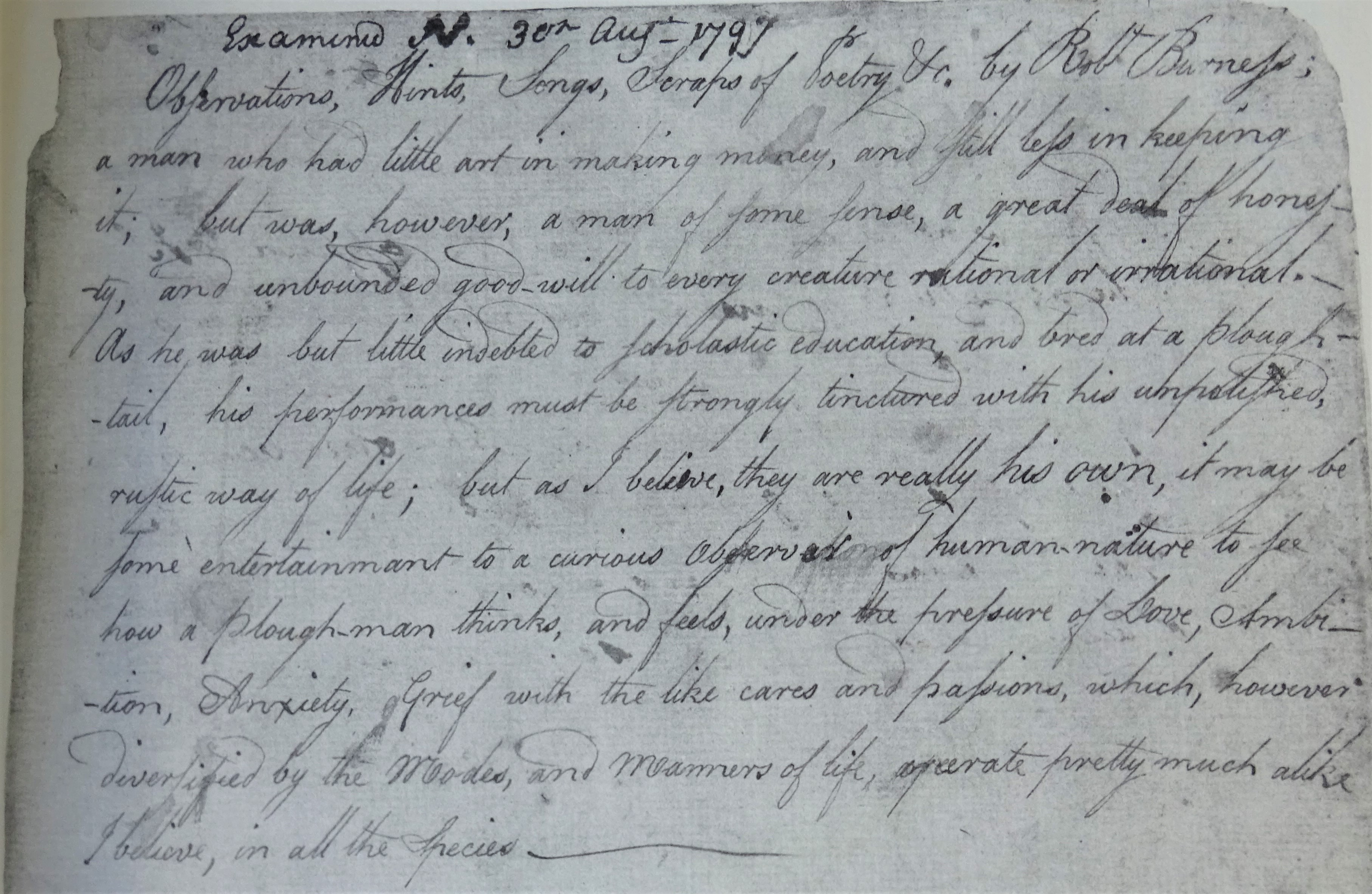
- Robert Burns's holograph in his Commonplace Book 1783–1785
- Born: 25 March 1747; Ayr, Scotland
- Died: circa 1824; London, England
- Occupation: Teacher

John Murdoch of Ayr was Robert Burns's most significant teacher or tutor and he was a friend of the Burnes family. He was born in 1747 and first taught Gilbert and Robert Burns in Alloway when he was only aged eighteen. He remained in contact with the Burnes family for several years after leaving Ayrshire for London. Murdoch, William Burnes and Richard Brown were amongst the most significant influences on Burns life during his early years in Ayrshire.

== Life and character ==
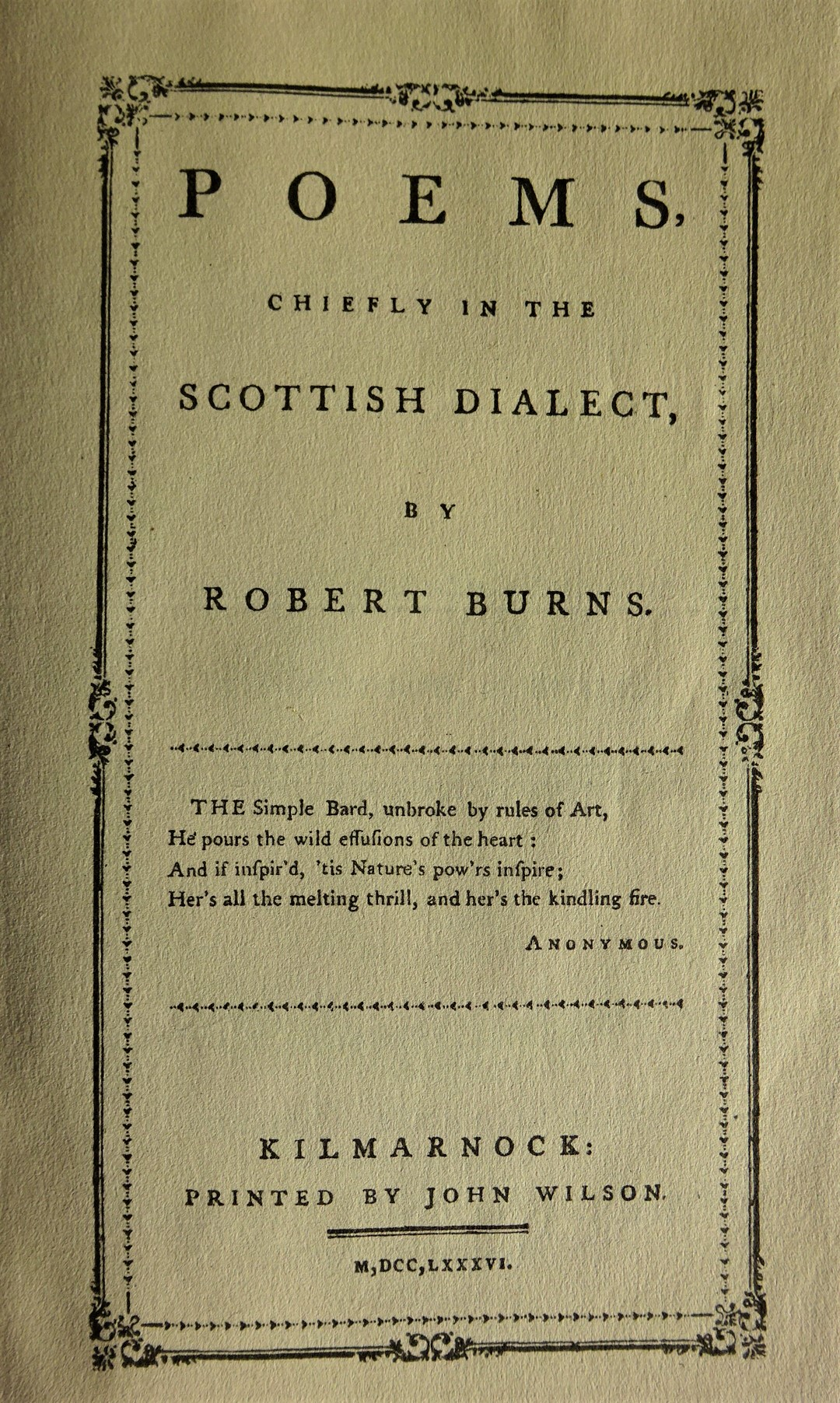
The Kilmarnock Edition of Poems, Chiefly in the Scottish Dialect

Murdoch's parents were John Murdoch, a teacher and session clark in Auchinleck, and Margaret Robinson. The family lived in Ayr's Sandgate in a two-storey house, long demolished, but marked with a plaque.

He was a member of the Dumfries Volunteers, serving as a first lieutenant. In 1800 he was a collector of cess for Dumfrieshire.

In 1776 Murdoch was sacked after around three years from his position at Ayr Burgh School on 14 February 1776, following his intoxicated slanderous comments against the Rev. William Dalrymple, saying that he "was as revengeful as Hell, and as false as the devil; and that he was a liar, or a damned liar". It is not known what direct circumstances led to this outburst other than he felt that he was not being given sufficient attention by the minister in regard of his role and position as a teacher. The complaint recorded by the Procurator-Fiscal stated that Mrs Tennent, an inn-keeper and a weaver, Patrick Auld had overheard these "unworthy, base, reproachful and wicked expressions".

Murdoch moved with his wife to London where he taught French and made a good living for a time until the influx of French refugee priests, etc. who came to Britain as a result of the French Revolution provided so much competition that he opened a stationery shop and library to try and make ends meet. He wrote and published a few books on the French language, such as Radical Vocabulary of the French Language, Pronunciation and Orthography of the French of the French Language, Dictionary of Distinctions and one entitled Rules to be Observed by the Natives of Scotland for Attaining a Just Pronunciation of English a book that made its way into John Walker's 1802 dictionary. He travelled in France and at Paris he met Colonel Fullarton who worked at the British Embassy and introduced him to many wealthy and well connected individuals, including Napoleon's and Louis XVIII's Foreign Minister, Charles de Talleyrand, to whom he taught English.

The Gentleman's Magazine of February 1824 reported that the 77 year old Murdoch was seeking a public subscription for support. He died in dire poverty and was buried at St Andrew's Gardens Burial Grounds at Greys Inn Road, London. It is also recorded that the friends and admirers of Burns raised sufficient funds to provide Murdoch with the bare necessities.

== Association with Robert Burns ==
In May 1765, whilst living at Alloway, William Burnes interviewed and employed the Ayr Academy educated and university graduate eighteen year old John Murdoch to act as tutor or preceptor to his children and those of four of his neighbours; Robert was about seven at the time. The interview had taken place at Simpson's Inn, Ayr where he also required Murdoch to provide a specimen of his handwriting and he questioned him on his teaching methods. Murdoch was a student at the Ayr Burgh School at the time, improving his English skills and was recommended by David Tennant, English master at the school.

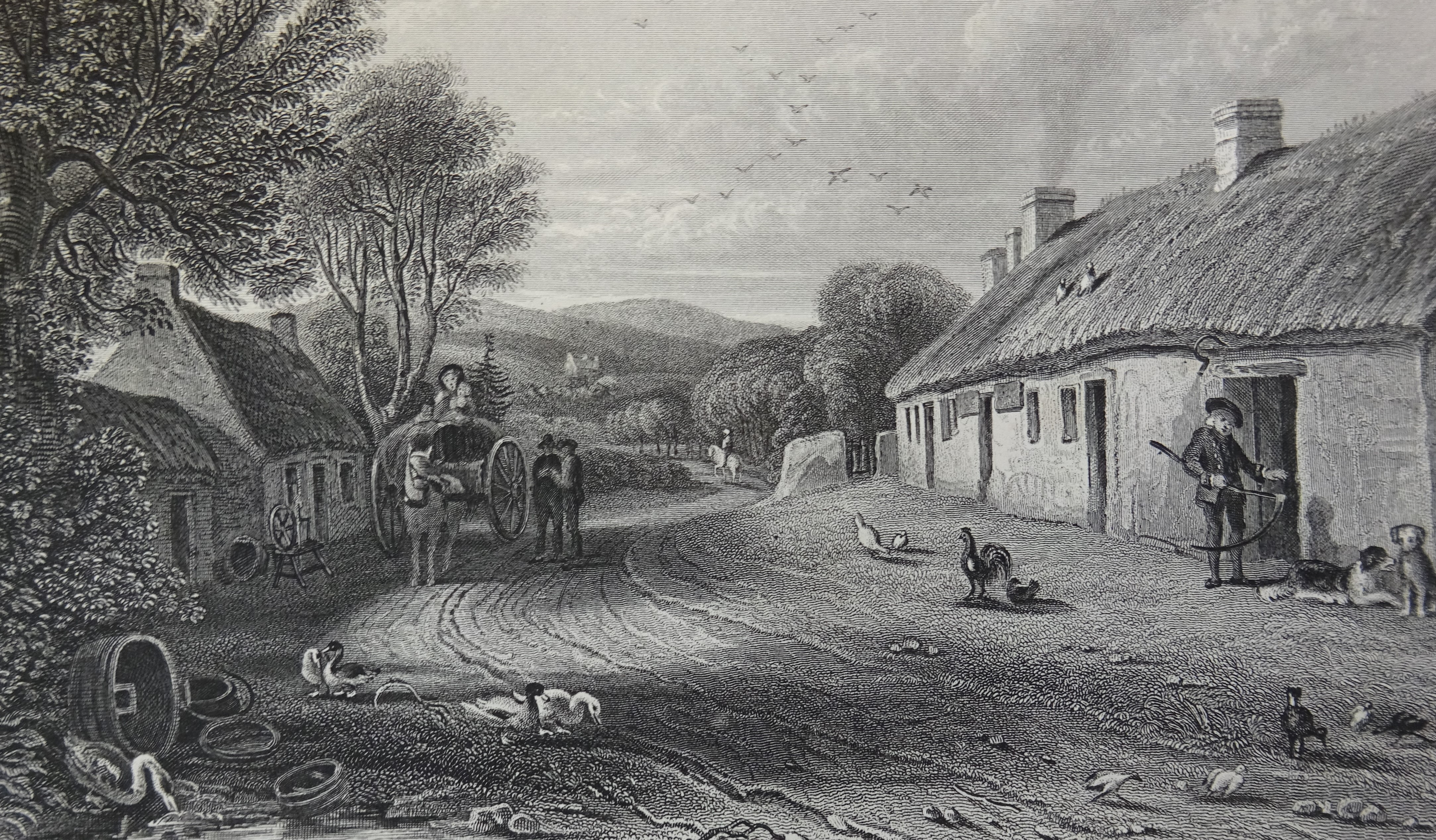
Burns's Cottage in Alloway.

He was provided with room and board by the children's parents in rotation and the school building was close to the Burnes family home, sadly demolished in 1878. After the family moved to Mount Oliphant, Robert and Gilbert continued to attend his school in Alloway for another two years, walking there and back, but their attendance was irregular. Murdoch went to work for a wealthy farmer who had a number of sons.

When Murdoch was about to leave to work in Carrick he decided to spend the night with the Burnes family and brought a small compendium of English Grammar and the book Titus Andronicus. Murdoch read the play out loud and all went well until till he came to the part where a female in the play has her hands cut off and her tongue cut out. At this point, the family "with one voice desired that he would read no more". William Burnes observed, that "if we would not hear it out, it would be needless to leave the play with us. Robert replied that if it was left he would burn it". William considered rebuking Robert for this response to his tutor's kindness, but Murdoch commented "that he liked to see so much sensibility". He left instead a comedic work, the School for Love.

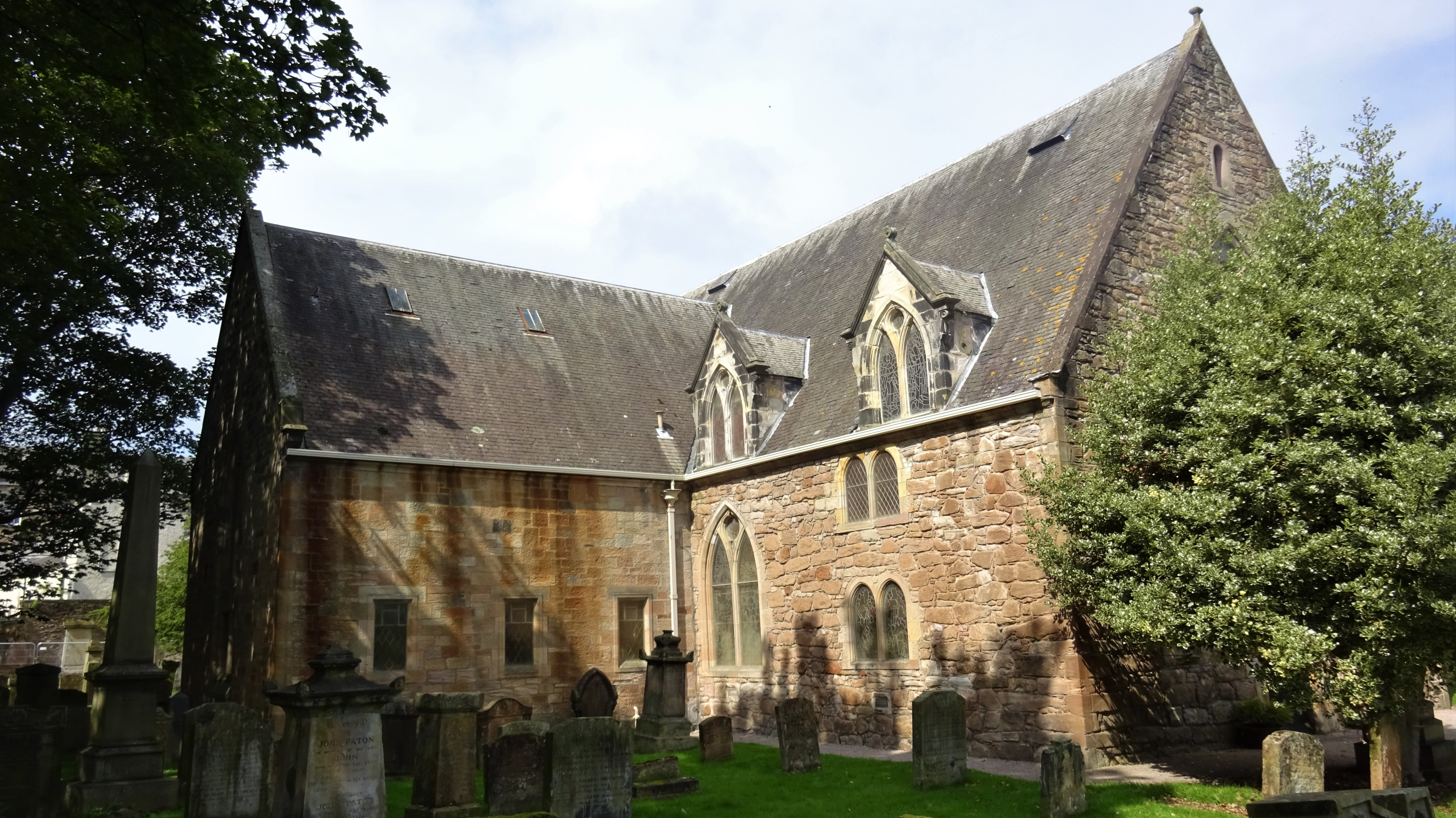
The old Kirk of Ayr.

Murdoch moved away for several years, returning to Ayr from Dumfries in 1772 and Burns wrote that he "sent us Pope's Works, and some other poetry, the first that we had an opportunity of reading, excepting what is contained in the English Collection, and in the volume of the Edinburgh Magazine for 1772".

The fourteen-year-old Robert Burns spent three weeks boarding and lodging with Murdoch, interrupted by harvest time, receiving instruction in English for a week in Ayr at the Sandgate, accompanied by his friend John Tennant of Laigh Corton Farm and he also began to learn French during the last two weeks, reading Fénelon's Telemaque. His father had also intended that Robert would become better able to instruct his brothers and sisters.

Murdoch was appointed at Ayr Burgh School as the "established teacher of the English language" and also the ex officio Ayr literary Society librarian, a position that enabled William Burnes to borrow books for his family even though they were not members. He lent Robert the Life of Hannibal, which was the first book he read outside of his school-books. He is said to have been a pedantic teacher however he kept in touch with the Burnes family. On half holidays he would often visit the Burnes family home, many times accompanied by academic companions who would join with William Burnes in deep and also discussions.

Murdoch observed that Agnes Burns would join in when she was free and that William was "an excellent husband, if I may judge from his assiduous attention to the ease and comfort of his worthy partner and from her affecionate behaviour to him, as well as her unwearied attention to the duties of a mother".

In a letter to James Currie, Murdoch said that William Burnes was 'The saint, the father, and the husband' "a tender and affectionate father of whose manly qualities and rational and Christian virtues he would not pretend to give a description ... In this mean cottage I really believe there dwelt a larger portion of content than in any palace in Europe."

Murdoch visited his old pupil, William Burns in 1790, then a journeyman saddler, who had moved to London. William was Robert Burns's younger brother. Shortly after his visit and before he could make a second William had died. Murdoch helped with the funeral arrangements, attended it as the principal mourner and sent Robert details of this sad occasion, a communication which proved to be his last with his old pupil.

=== Murdoch's recollections and impressions of Robert and Gilbert ===
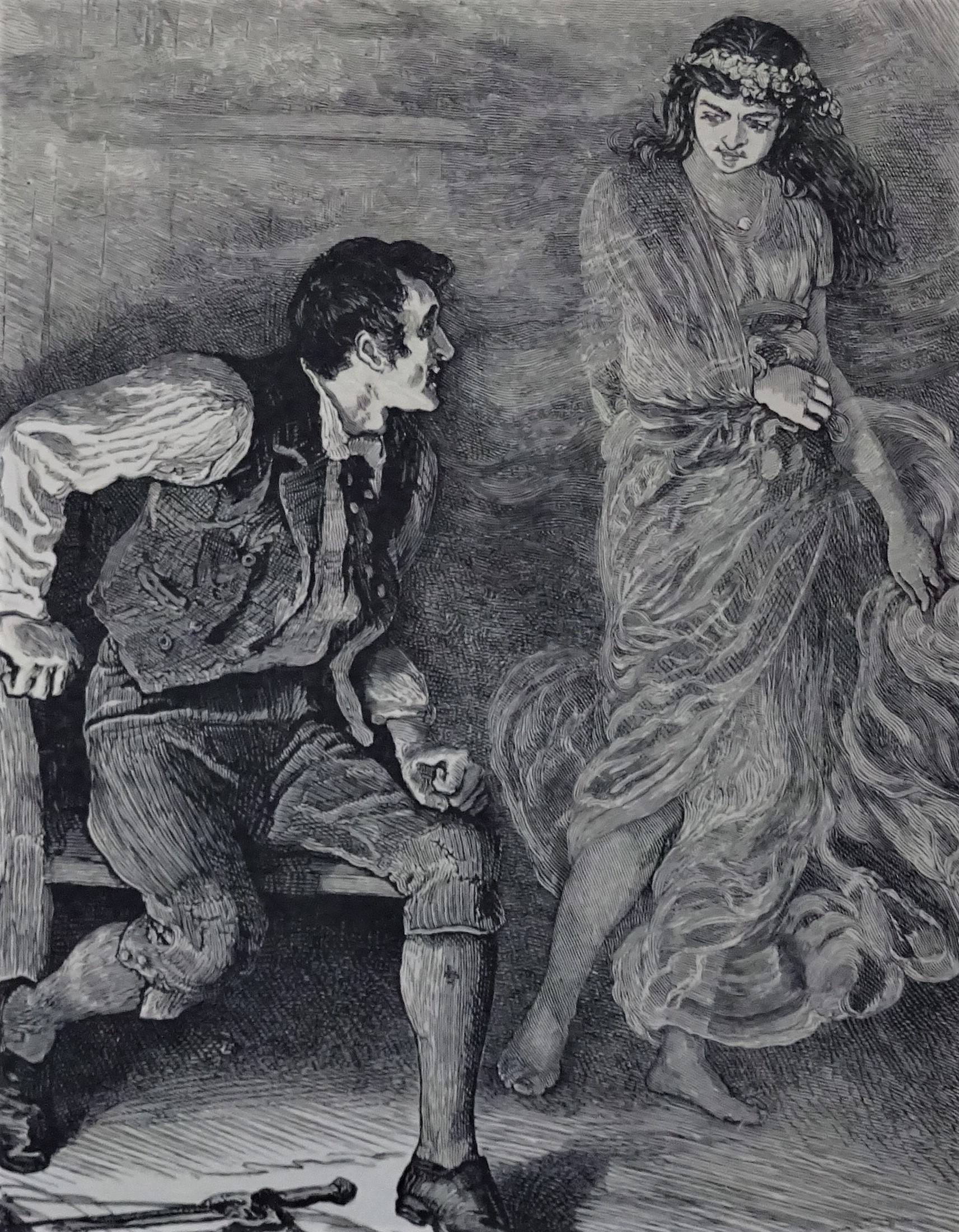
Robert Burns and his muse, Coila

"My pupil, Robert Burns, was then between six and seven years of age ... (he) and his younger brother Gilbert had been grounded a little in English before they were put under my care. They both made a rapid progress in reading, and a tolerable progress in writing. In reading, dividing words into syllables, spelling without book, parsing sentences, etc., Robert and Gilbert were generally at the upper end of the class, even when ranged with boys by far their seniors. The books most commonly used in the school were, the Spelling Book, the New Testament, the Bible, Masson's Collection of Prose and Verse and Fisher's English Grammar. They committed to memory the hymns, and other poems of that collection with uncommon facility. This facility was partly owing to the method pursued by their father and me in instructing them, which was, to make them thoroughly acquainted with the meaning of every word in each sentence that was to be committed to memory. By the by, this may be easier done, and at an earlier period, than is generally thought. As soon as they were capable of it, I taught them to turn verse into its natural prose order; and sometimes to substitute synonymous expressions for poetical words, and to supply all the elipses. These, you know, are the means of knowing that the pupil understand the author".

Regarding their talents Murdoch wrote that "Gilbert always appeared to me to possess a more lively imagination, and to be more of a wit, than Robert. I attempted to teach them a little church-music. Here they were left far behind by all the rest of the school. Robert's ear, in particular, was remarkably dull, and his voice untunable. It was long before I could get them to distinguish one tune from another. Robert's countenance was generally grave and expressive of a serious, contemplative and thoughtful mind. Gilbert's face said, "Mirth with thee I mean to live"; and certainly if any person who knew the two boys had been asked which of them was most likely to court the Muses, he would surely never have guessed that Robert had a propensity of that kind".

=== A Manual of Religious Belief ===
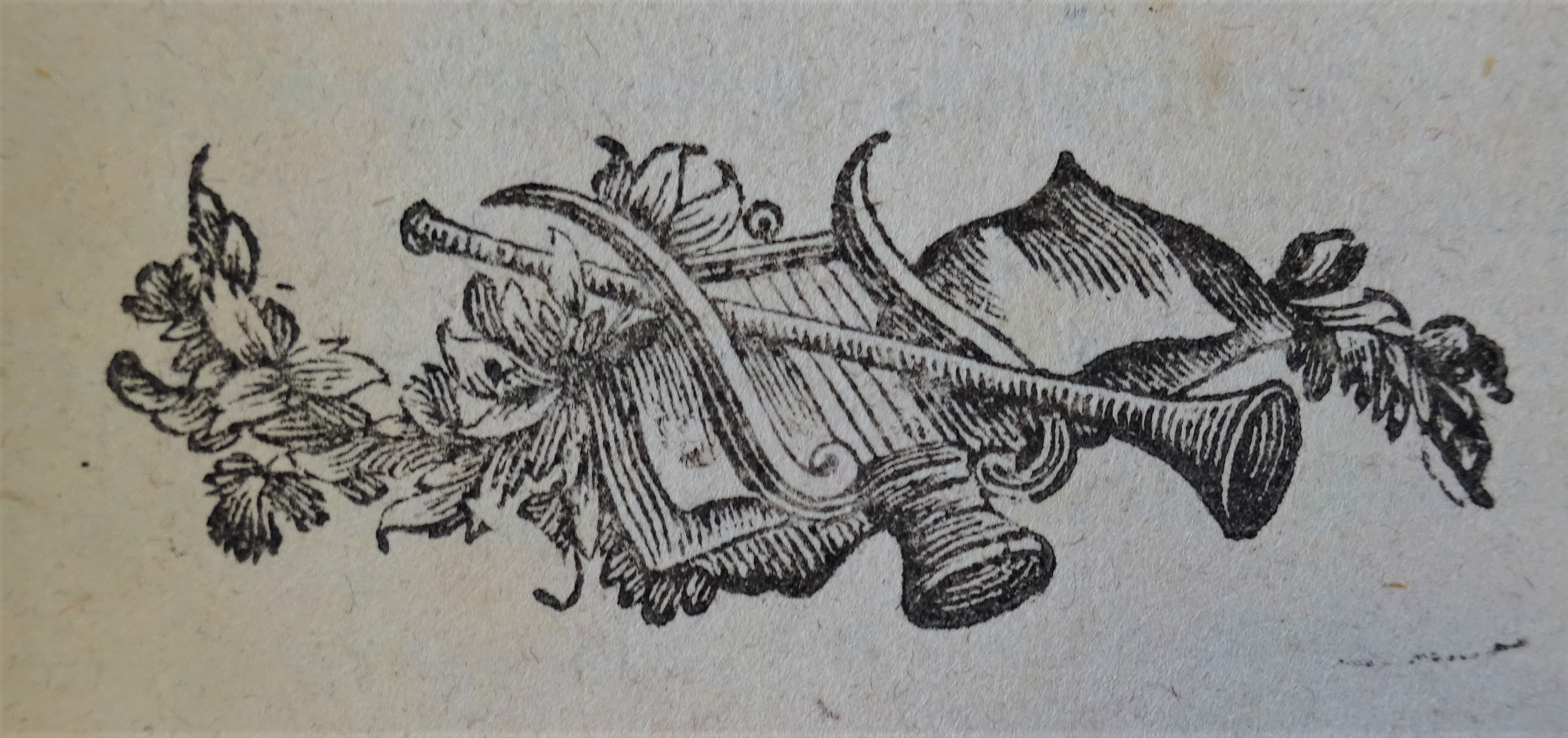
Lyre, horn and book fleuron from Poems, Letters, etc., etc. Ascribed to Robert Burns.

Circa 1777 Murdoch assisted William Burnes with his A Manual of Religious Belief that was created for use with the family. It was written in the distinctive holograph of John Murdoch and may have replaced an earlier version as Murdoch is said to have corrected William's grammar. Dr. James Currie wrote that:

"William Burnes was of a religious turn of mind, and, as is usual among the Scottish peasantry, a good deal conversant in speculative theology. There is in Gilbert's hands, a little "manual of religious belief" in the form of a dialogue between a father and his son, composed by him for the use of his children, in which the benevolence of his heart seems to have led him to soften the rigid Calvinism of the Scottish church, into something approaching Arminianism."

It has been remarked that a number of features of John Murdoch's handwriting appear to feature in Robert Burns's early hand.

=== Correspondence ===
On 15 January 1783 Burns wrote to Murdoch in London from Lochlee Farm:

"Dear Sir ... I have not forgotten, nor will ever forget the many obligations I lie under to your kindness and friendship. I do not doubt, Sir, but you will wish to know what has been the result of all the pains of an indulgent father, and a masterly teacher... In the matter of books, indeed, I am very profuse. My favourite authors are of the sentimental kind, such as Shenstone, particularly in his Elegies; [James] Thomson; A man of Feeling (a book I prize next to the Bible); Man of the World; [Laurence] Sterne, especially his Sentimental Journey; [James] McPherson's Ossian, etc.: these are the glorious models after which I endeavour to form my conduct"."

On 28 October 1787 Murdoch wrote to Burns from London regarding the success of his old pupil's publications:

"If ever you come hither, you will have the satisfaction of seeing your poems relished by the Caledonians in London full as much as they can be by those of Edinburgh. We frequently repeat some of your verses in our Caledonian Society, and you may believe I am not a little vain that I have had some share in cultivating such a genius".

On 16 July 1790 Burns wrote to Murdoch regarding his brother William who lived in London. He stated that William would be pleased to meet a friend of his father's and he passed on details of his last address.

On 14 September 1790 he wrote to Burns recalling that his friend Mr Kennedy had informed him that William was ill and that he had set out as soon as he was free to visit him however upon arrival he discovered that William had died. He had contacted doctor friends, but their services were of no purpose as he had died from a putrid fever.

== See also ==
- Robert Aiken
- Jean Armour
- Lesley Baillie
- Alison Begbie
- Nelly Blair
- Isabella Burns
- May Cameron
- Mary Campbell (Highland Mary)
- Jenny Clow
- Gavin Hamilton (lawyer)
- Helen Hyslop
- Nelly Kilpatrick
- Jessie Lewars
- John McMurdo
- Anne Rankine
- Isabella Steven
- Peggy Thompson
- James Smith (draper)
