= James Smith (draper) =

Scottish draper (1765–c.1823)

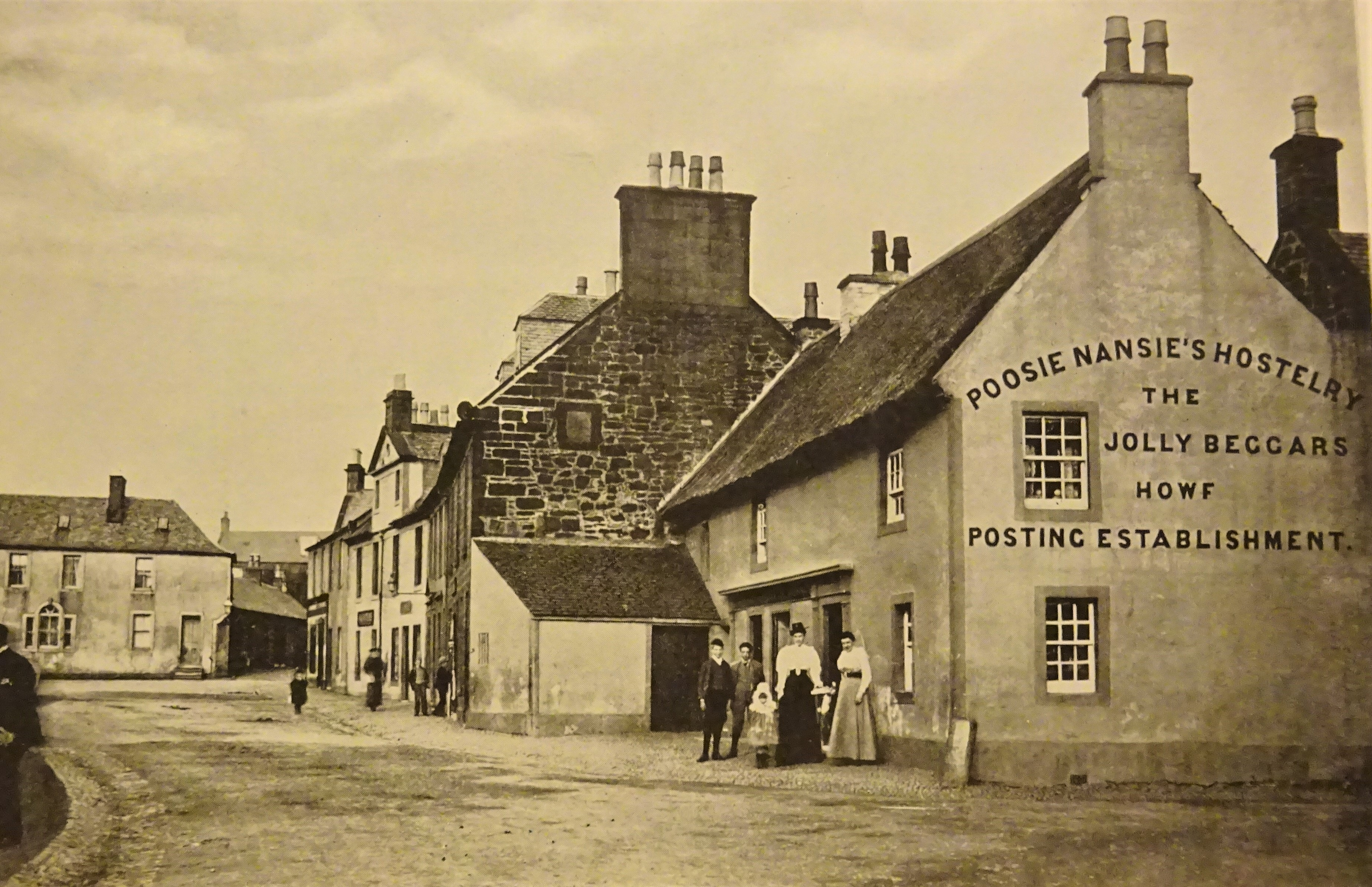
- Poosie Nansies in 1900.
- Born: 1 March 1765; Mauchline parish
- Died: circa 1823; Jamaica or St Lucia
- Occupation: Draper

James Smith of Mauchline was one of Robert Burns's closest friends and confidants. He was born in 1765, son of a Mauchline merchant, Ayrshire, Scotland. In 1775, when he was only ten years, old his father, Robert Smith, a prosperous local merchant, was killed in a riding accident, falling from his horse whilst returning from Ayr. His mother, Jean Smith, remarried James Lamie who owned the adjoining house.

== Life and character ==
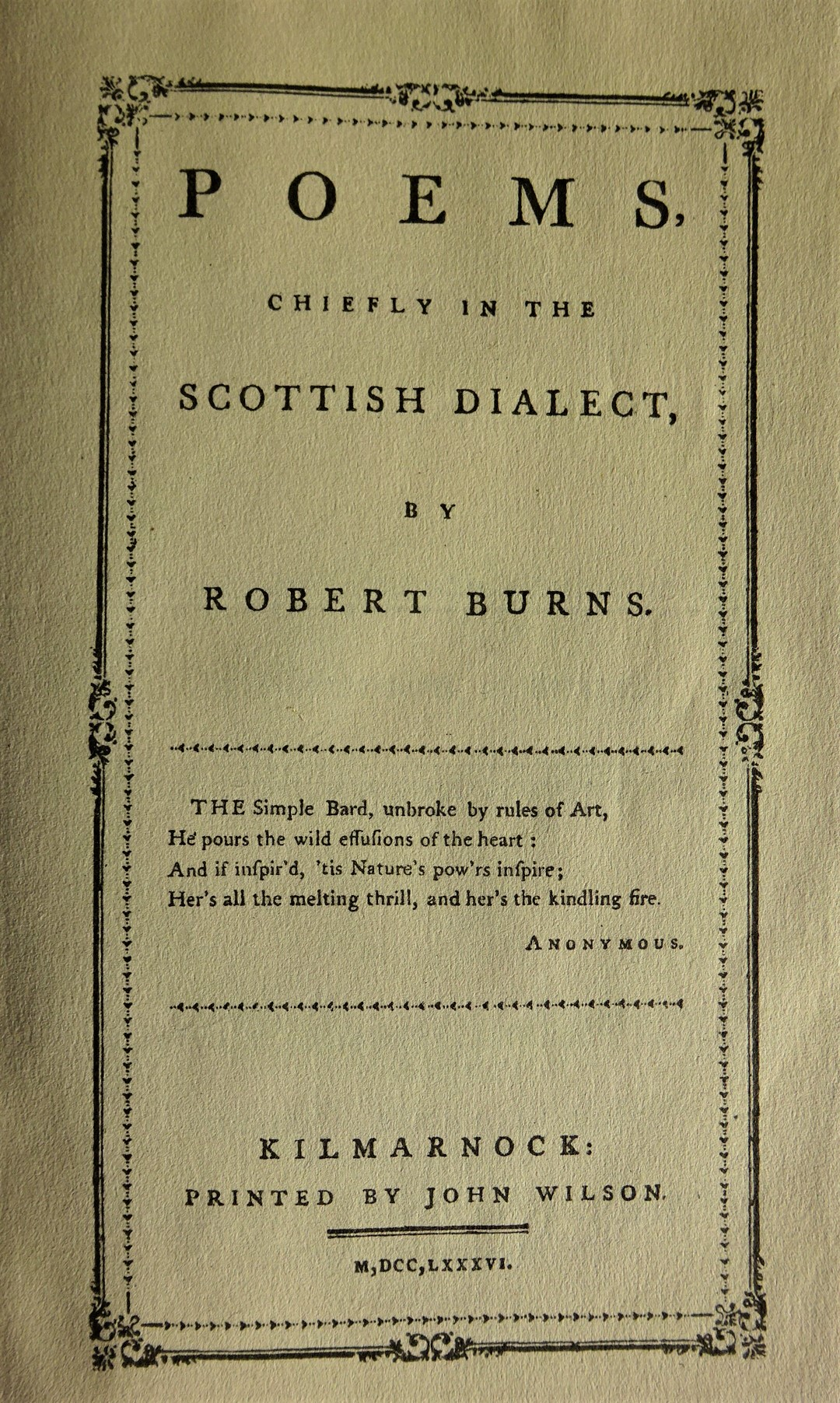
The Kilmarnock Edition of Poems, Chiefly in the Scottish Dialect

After his father's death his mother married on 11 March 1777 a man with a reputation for pious and austere behaviour, a strict 'Auld Licht' Mauchline Kirk elder, named Mr. James Lamie or Lammie who attempted to provide a strict upbringing for his stepson. James Lammie is said to not have approved of James or his associates. Jean bore James Lamie a son, James, on 6 August 1780.

It was James Lamie who had accompanied Willie Fisher on a visit to Jean Armour's parents regarding her rumoured pregnancy out of wedlock. He was also directly involved in the Kirk Session's disputes with Gavin Hamilton. Lamie was buried in Mauchline kirkyard next to the Rev. William Auld.

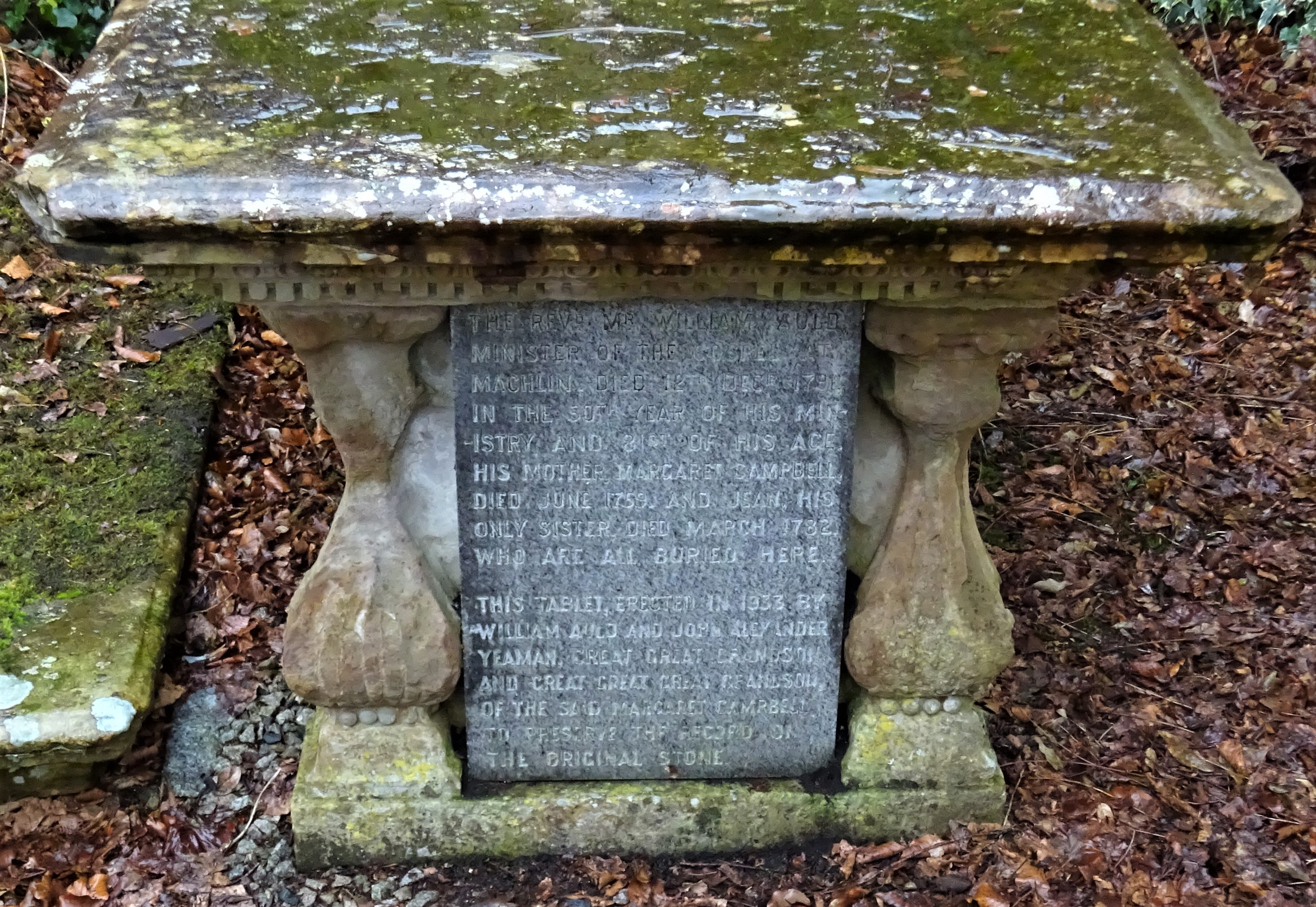
William Auld's memorial and James Lamie's grave to the left

Smith's sister was Jean Smith (b.1768 d.1854), one of the Mauchline Belles who married Dr James Candlish circa 1794, originally McCandlish, childhood school friend of Burns from Purclewan Mill near Mount Oliphant. Jean was buried in Edinburgh at the Old Calton Burial Ground. Burns referred to her in the poem "The Belles of Mauchline" as "Miss Smith she has wit".

He ran a drapery shop in his old home that lay opposite Nanse Tunnock's. Boyle states that his home and workshop stood at the north side of Mauchline Cross but was demolished in 1820 when the new Kilmarnock Road was built. James Lamie's house stood adjacent to his shop.

Smith is described as "..a wild young rake of a fellow; who was never out of mischief. Kind and good-natured the young lad certainly was; but then he was so perversly fond of fun and frolic, that the good old man declared there was no living with him". Janes kept irregular hours and a story is recounted by a servant, Helen Miller, that when found cleaning James's shoes Lamie tore them from her hands and threw them across the room with considerable force, saying that the young vagabond could clean them himself.

Smith left Mauchline by the end of 1785 and became a partner in a calico-printing company in Avon near Linlithgow however this enterprise failed.

In 1788 Smith took ship to Jamaica, although De Lancey Ferguson gives St Lucia as his destination, and he eventually died on the island, however the date and place of his death are not formally recorded, but in Cromek's Reliques of Robert Burns he is said in 1808 to already be deceased whilst another source gives 1823.

Smith, as recorded by the Kirk Session, had an illegitimate son with Christina Wilson, one of his mother's servants, fifteen years his senior. Ironically she had been employed specifically to help mend his wayward behaviour. Smith always denied being the father of the boy although locally it was taken for granted. She moved to Bridgend after the child was born.

== Association with Robert Burns ==
Smith was introduced to Robert Burns by John Richmond and together with William Hunter, a tanner, the four became close friends, 'ram-stam boys' "Unco pack an' thick thegither" and formed the notorious 'Court of Equity' at the Whitefoord Arms, as poetically described in Burns's "Libel Summons". James Smith was the Procurator Fiscal; Burns was the Perpetual President; William Hunter the Messenger at Arms and Richmond the Clerk of the Court. The 'court' met to debate and discuss the scandals in the village and the punishments that each crime merited. Burns received a mock-summons to stand before the court, the Libel Summons". This 1786 poem is also known as the Court of Equity or The Fornicators Court, however manuscript evidence suggests that 'Libel Summons' was Robert Burns's chosen title.

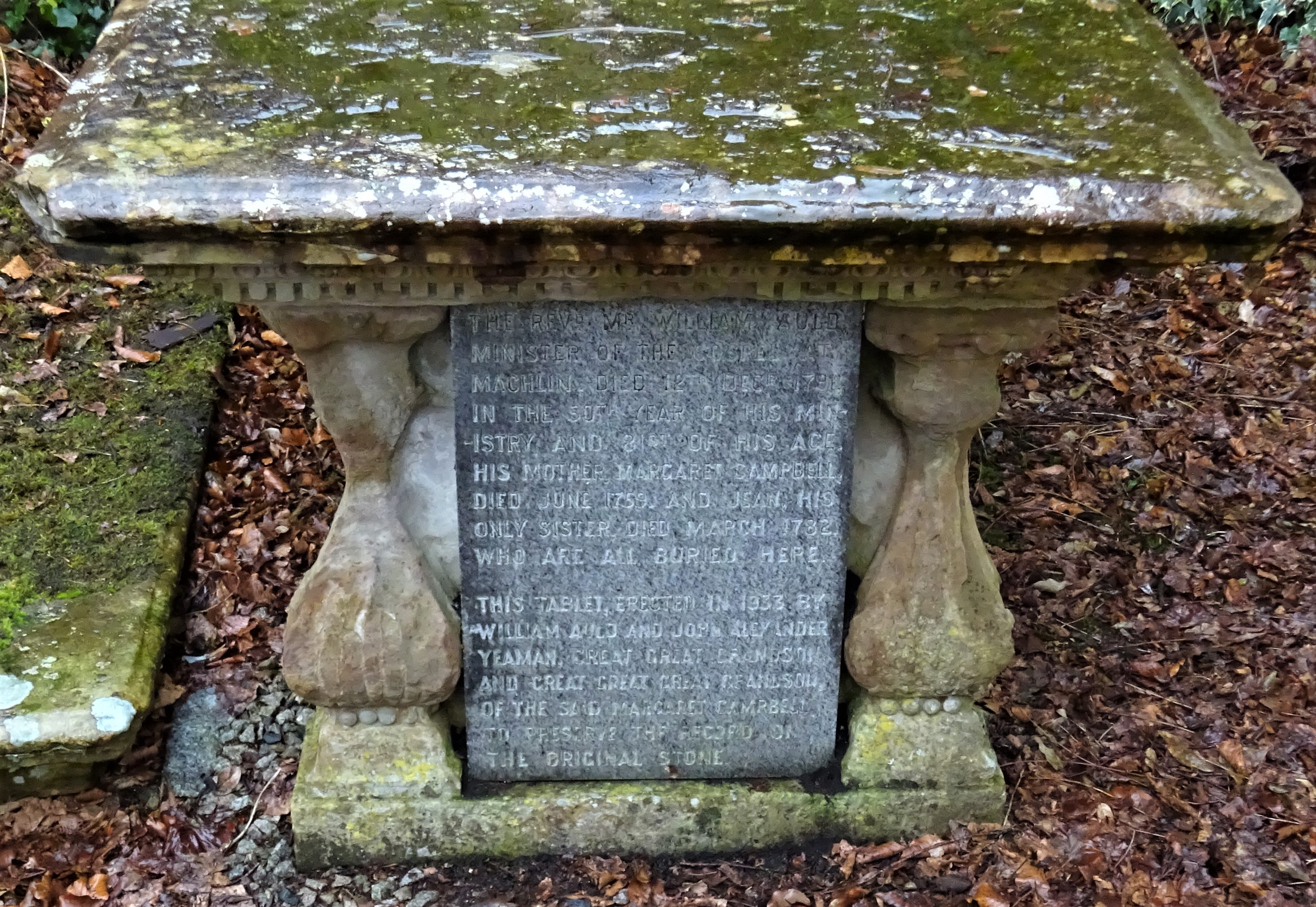
Rev William 'Daddy' Auld's grave in Mauchline.

Smith, Richmond and Burns are thought to have been in Poosie Nancie's Inn at Mauchline when the scenes of enthusiastic revelry amongst a group who were beggars by day inspired the poet to write his cantata Love and Liberty or The Jolly Beggars.

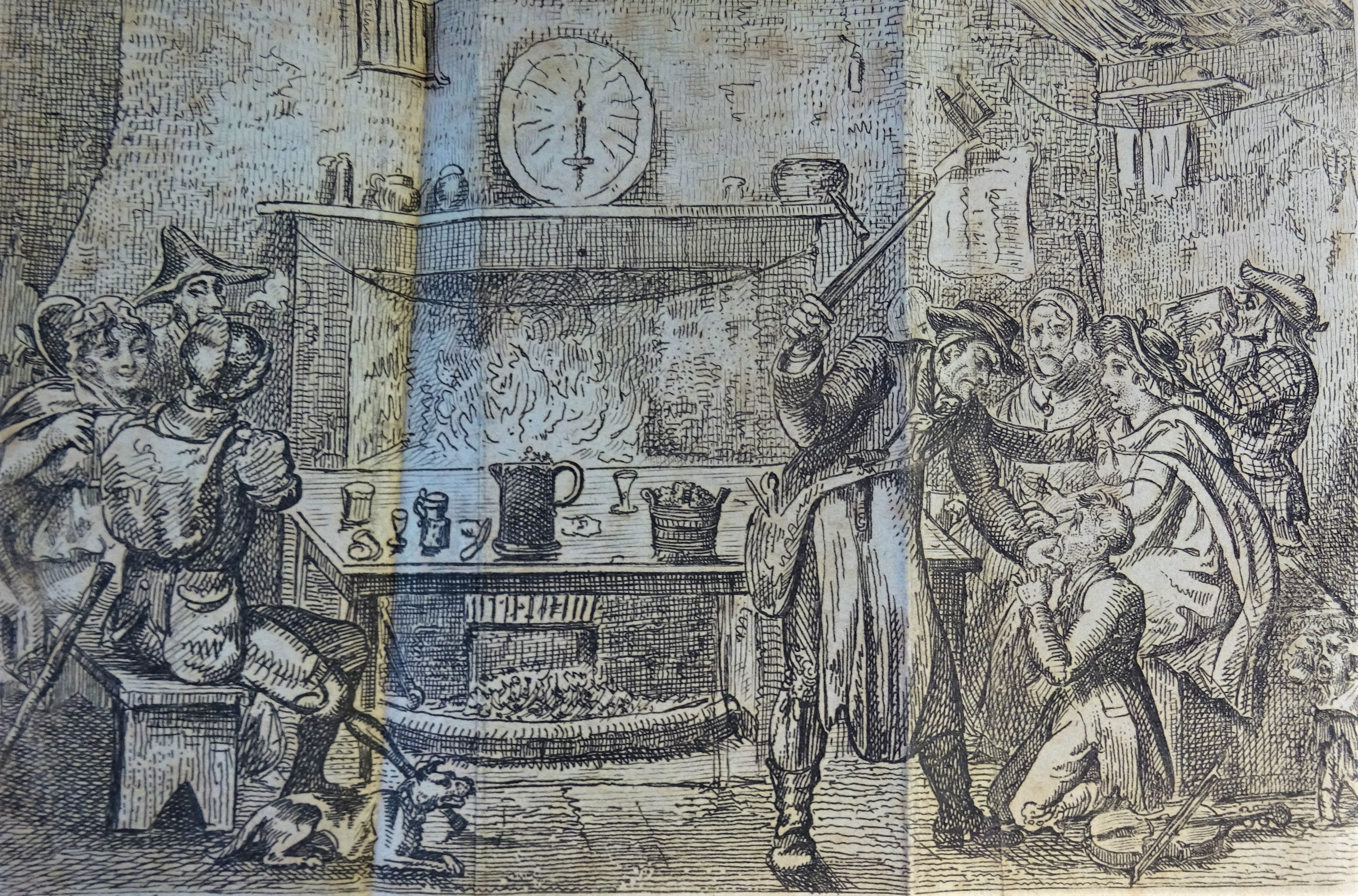
The Jolly Beggars by Isaac Cruikshank

Smith was a subscriber to enlist subscribers for 41 copies of the 'Kilmarnock Edition'.

Richmond contributed to the so-called Train Manuscript which recorded how Burns's friends had informed him of Mary Campbell's infidelity with James Montgomerie of Coilsfield House, brother to the Earl of Eglinton.

The details are that in December 1817 John Richmond was interviewed by William Grierson and related that James Montgomerie and Mary Campbell met frequently in the 'Elbow Inn', a small Mauchline ale house. On one occasion John Richmond, Smith and some other friends of Burns took him to the 'Elbow' knowing that James and Mary were there together. They waited and eventually Mary exited from a private room and was playfully heckled, followed some time later by Montgomerie. Burns blushed and muttered damn it and suffered much good natured banter. It made no difference however and a few days later Richmond stated that he returned to her like the dog to its vomit. Unsurprisingly these details of Mary Campbell's behaviour was very unpopular once exposed. A nephew of Richmond is on record as having said that his uncle was an inveterate liar.

In Burns's "Libel Summons" he refers to Smith "Next merchant Smith, our worthy Fiscal, To cow each pertinacious rascal; In this, as every other state. His merit is conspicuous great".

A story was related by Christina of Smith and Burns inviting Christina and the child to visit them in a tavern and Burns teasing the boy about James being his father, with the result that the two year old lad exclaimed "But ye er my faether, ye er my faether".

=== For a Wag in Mauchline ===
This work was addressed to John Smith.

LAMENT ‘im Mauchline husbands a',
He aften did assist ye;
For had ye staid whole weeks awa,
Your wives they ne'er had miss'd ye.

Ye Mauchline bairns, as on ye pass
To school in bands thegither,
O tread ye lightly on his grass,
Perhaps he was your father.

=== Epistle "To James Smith" ===
This epistle was written in 1785 and the work was included in the 1786 Poems, Chiefly in the Scottish Dialect from pages 69 to 78. The first three stanzas :

"Dear S****, the sleest, pawkie thief,
That e'er attempted stealth or rief,
Ye surely hae some warlock-breef
Owre human hearts;
For ne'er a bosom yet was prief
Against your arts.

For me, I swear by sun an' moon,
And ev'ry star that blinks aboon,
Ye've cost me twenty pair o' shoon,
Just gaun to see you;
And ev'ry ither pair that's done,
Mair taen I'm wi' you.

That auld, capricious carlin, Nature,
To mak amends for scrimpet stature,
She's turn'd you off, a human creature
On her first plan,
And in her freaks, on ev'ry feature,
She's wrote, the Man.

=== Correspondence ===
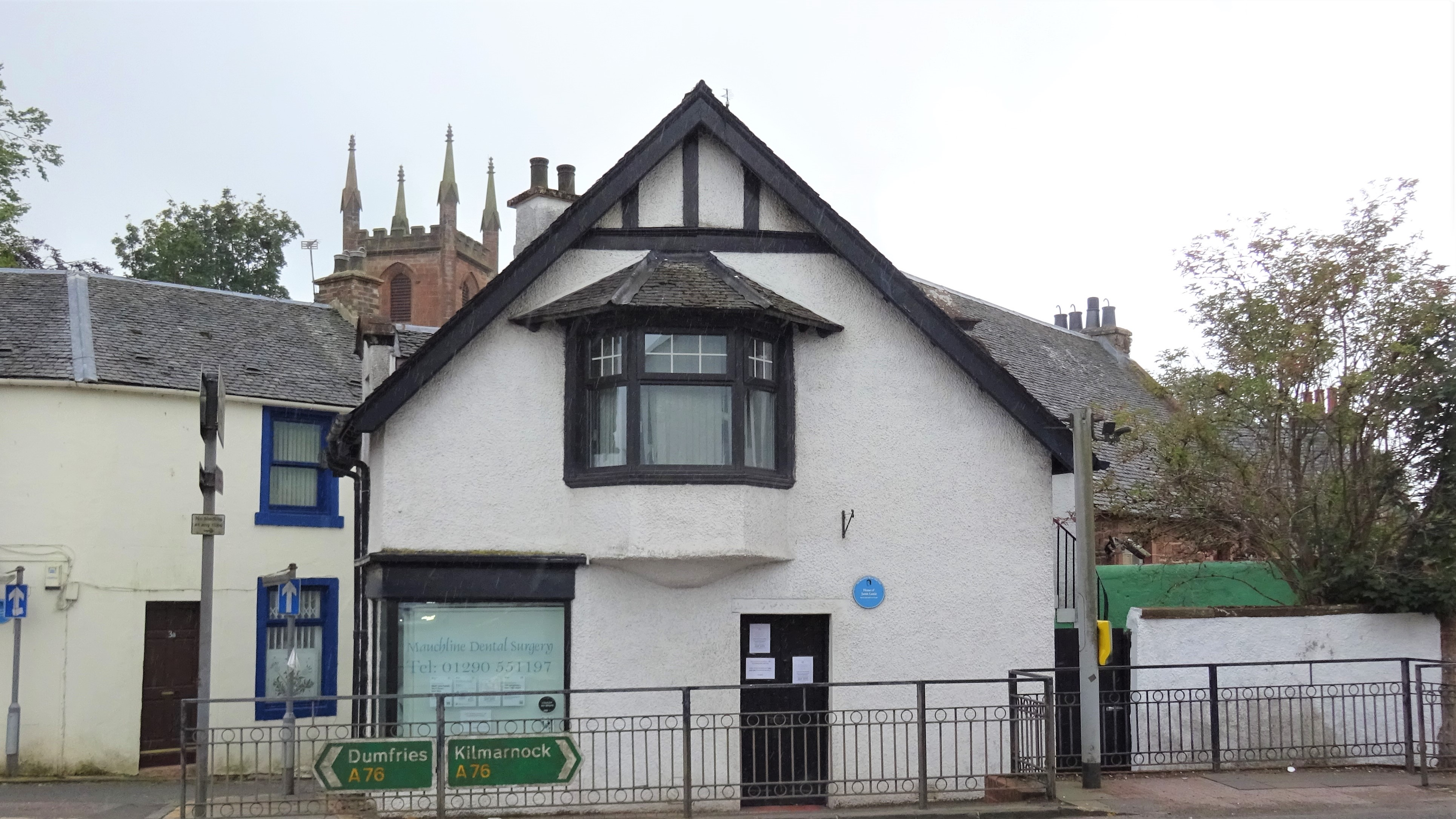
James Lamie's house.

In February 1786 Burns wrote to Richmond saying "My chief patron is Mr Aiken in Ayr who is pleased to express great approbation of my works". He also wrote that "I am extremely happy with Smith; he is all the friend I have NOW in Machlin (sic)" and added that "I have some very important news with respect to myself, not the most agreeable, news that I am sure you cannot guess, but I shall give you the particulars another time.".

On 30 July 1786 Burns wrote to Richmond from Old Rome Foord where the poet was hiding. My hour is now come. You and I will never meet in Britain more. --., have orders within three weeks at farthest to repair aboard the Nancy, Captain Smith from Clyde, to Jamaica, and to call at Antigua. This, except to our friend Smith, whom God long preserve, Is a secret about Mauchline.".

Circa 1 August 1786 Burns wrote to Smith saying that at the time of Jean Armour's supposed desertion of him he would meet her "If you see Jean tell her, I will meet her, So help me Heaven in my hour of need." Burns also commented "Against two things however, I am fix'd as Fate: staying at home, and owning her conjugally. The first, by Heaven I will not do! the last, by Hell, I will never do!".

He added:

O Jeany, thou hast stolen away my soul!
In vain I strive against the lov'd idea:
Thy tender image sallies on my thoughts,
My firm resolves become an easy prey!

This letter in autograph sold for £12,500 in 2020.

Burns wrote to Smith in August 1786 regarding his intended journey to Jamaica, saying that his plans had been altered due to information from friends of Dr Patrick Douglas informing him that the cost of the journey would be upward of £50 as the ship was not sailing directly to the island. A cheaper fare from Greenock would not be available until September.

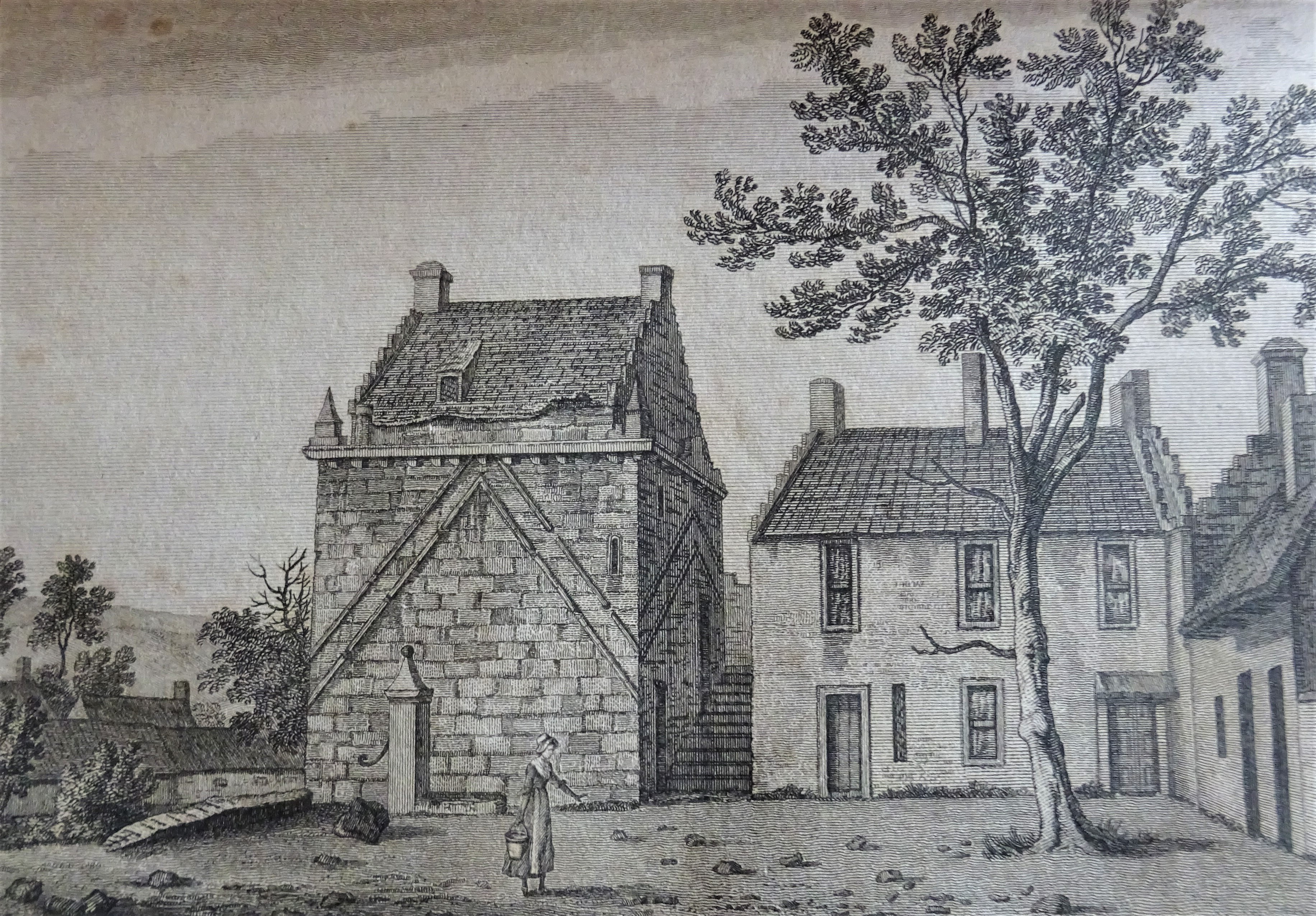
The Abbot's Tower and Gavin Hamilton's house at Mauchline.

On 11 June 1787 he wrote saying "I date this from Mauchline, where I arrived on Friday even last. If any thing had been wanting to disgust me completely at Armour's family, their mean, servile, compliance would have done it".

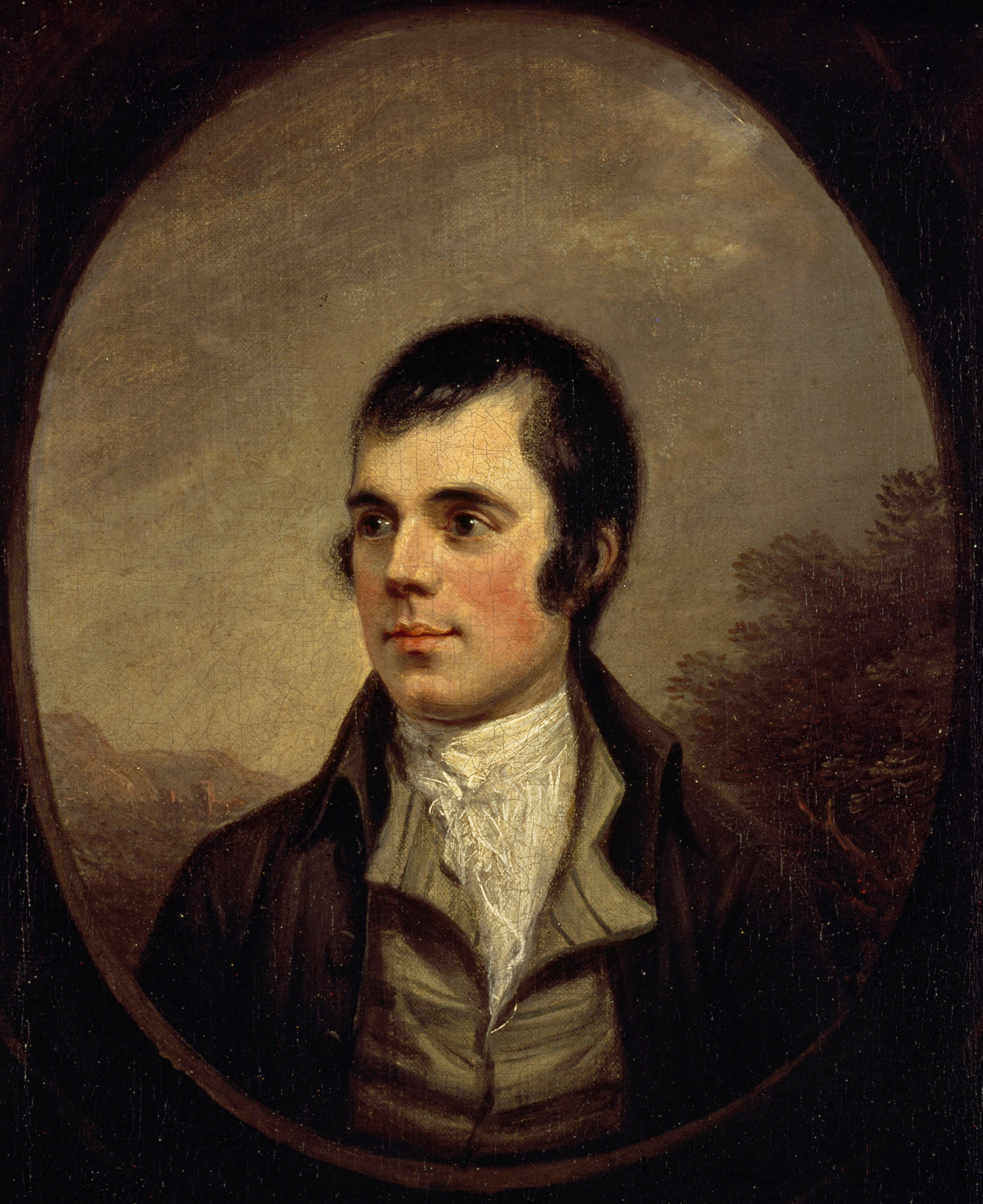
Full view of the Naysmith portrait of 1787, Scottish National Portrait Gallery

In June 1787 he boasted to Smith of his skills as a seducer saying after a cool response to an approach that "I am an old hawk at the sport, and wrote her such a cool, deliberate, prudent reply, as brought my bird from her aerial towerings, pop, down at my foot, like Corporal Trim's hat".

Burns wrote on 30 June and related the tale of his race on Jenny Geddes against the 'Highlandman' that resulted in a fall that delayed his progress back to Edinburgh.

On 28 April 1788 Burns wrote to Smith in Linlithgow "So to let you into secrets of my pericranium, there is, you must know, a certain clean-limbed, handsome, bewitching young hussy of your acquaintance, to whom I have lately and privately given a matrimonial title to my corpus ... Now for business. -- I intend to present Mrs Burns with a printed shawl, an article of which I daresy you have variety: 'Tis my first present to her since I have irrevocibly called her mine ... Mrs Burns ('Tis only her private designation) begs her best compliments to you".

== See also ==
- Robert Aiken
- Jean Armour
- John Ballantine
- Lesley Baillie
- Alison Begbie
- Nelly Blair
- Isabella Burns
- May Cameron
- Mary Campbell (Highland Mary)
- Jenny Clow
- Gavin Hamilton (lawyer)
- Helen Hyslop
- Nelly Kilpatrick
- Jessie Lewars
- John McMurdo
- Anne Rankine
- Isabella Steven
- Peggy Thompson
