= John Lapraik =

Scottish poet

John Lapraik (1727 – 7 May 1807) was a Scottish farmer and poet, and friend of Robert Burns.

== Life ==
The family name is derived from the French 'Laprivick' or 'Lekprevick' and the first of the Scottish branch had accompanied Mary Queen of Scots to Scotland and after her defeat at Langside he settled at Dalfram Farm. Lapraik was born at Laigh Dalquhram, about three miles west of Muirkirk, Ayrshire, in 1727. After attending the local school he succeeded his father, as the eldest son, to the family estate, which was of considerable extent. He also rented the lands and mill of Muirsmill, in the neighbourhood. In March 1754 he married Margaret Rankine, sister of Burns's friend John Rankine.

She died about 1762 after the birth of her fifth child. In 1766 Lapraik married Janet Anderson of Lightshaw, from a neighbouring farm. They had nine children, and Janet survived her husband by fifteen years. Lapraik held the lands of Nether Dalquhram, Laigh Hall or Upper Dalquhram and Douglass Dalquhram. He also leased the lands of Muirsmill close to Dalquhran.

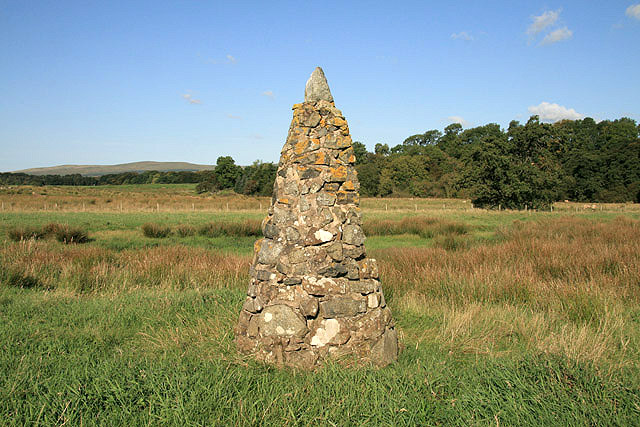
Memorial to John Lapraik, by the River Ayr near Muirkirk, erected in 1914 by the Lapraik Burns Club of Muirkirk

Ruined by the collapse of the Ayr Bank in 1772, Lapraik had first to let and then to sell his estate; for several years he struggled to retain his mill and farms, but after an interval had to relinquish them. He was imprisoned as a debtor in Ayr, and released in 1785. He leased lands and the mill at Muirsmill a second time, moved to Nether Wellwood for a couple of years' and finally in 1798 he opened a public-house at Muirkirk, conducting the village post-office on the same premises. He died there, aged 80, on 7 May 1807.

== Lapraik and Robert Burns ==
Early in 1785 Robert Burns heard the song "When I upon thy bosom lean" at a "rocking", or social gathering, in his house at Mossgiel Farm, Mauchline. Learning that Lapraik was the author, he made his acquaintance, sending him a verse epistle, dated 1 April 1785. (Burns was not aware that the song was an adaptation of an anonymous lyric published in Walter Ruddiman's Weekly Magazine, 14 October 1773.) Lapraik replied in kind, and Burns sent a second epistle dated 21 April 1785. There were altogether three epistles to Lapraik; they were published by Burns in 1786.

Encouraged by Burns's interest, Lapraik published in 1788 a book of poems, Poems on Several Occasions. It was financed by subscribers and printed by John Wilson of Kilmarnock, who had printed Burns's first published poems two years earlier. However, the book did not sell well. John Richmond, a great friend of Burns, assisted Lapraik with gaining subscribers for the publication.
