= Anne Rankine =

Historical Scottish figure

- Born: circa 1759; Scotland
- Died: 1843; New Cumnock, Scotland
- Occupations: Housewife and Inn-keeper

Anne Rankine was the youngest daughter of a tenant farmer, John Rankine from Adamhill Farm that lay two miles from the Robert Burns's family farm at Lochlea. She married John Merry, an inn-keeper in Cumnock on 29 December 1782, and is buried in Cumnock old churchyard. She maintained she was the 'Annie' of Robert Burns' song 'The Rigs o' Barley', however some maintain that she was merely trying to encourage business at their inn at Cumnock. Her father was brother-in-law to John Lapraik the poet.

== Life and character ==
As stated, Anne was the daughter of a tenant farmer, a friend of Robert Burns, who is described by him as "rough, rude, ready-witted Rankine". She married an inn-keeper, John Merry, who died in 1802 and thereafter she ran the inn herself until she died in 1843, aged 84. Burns lodged at the inn in August 1786, four years after the song was written.

=== Association with Robert Burns ===
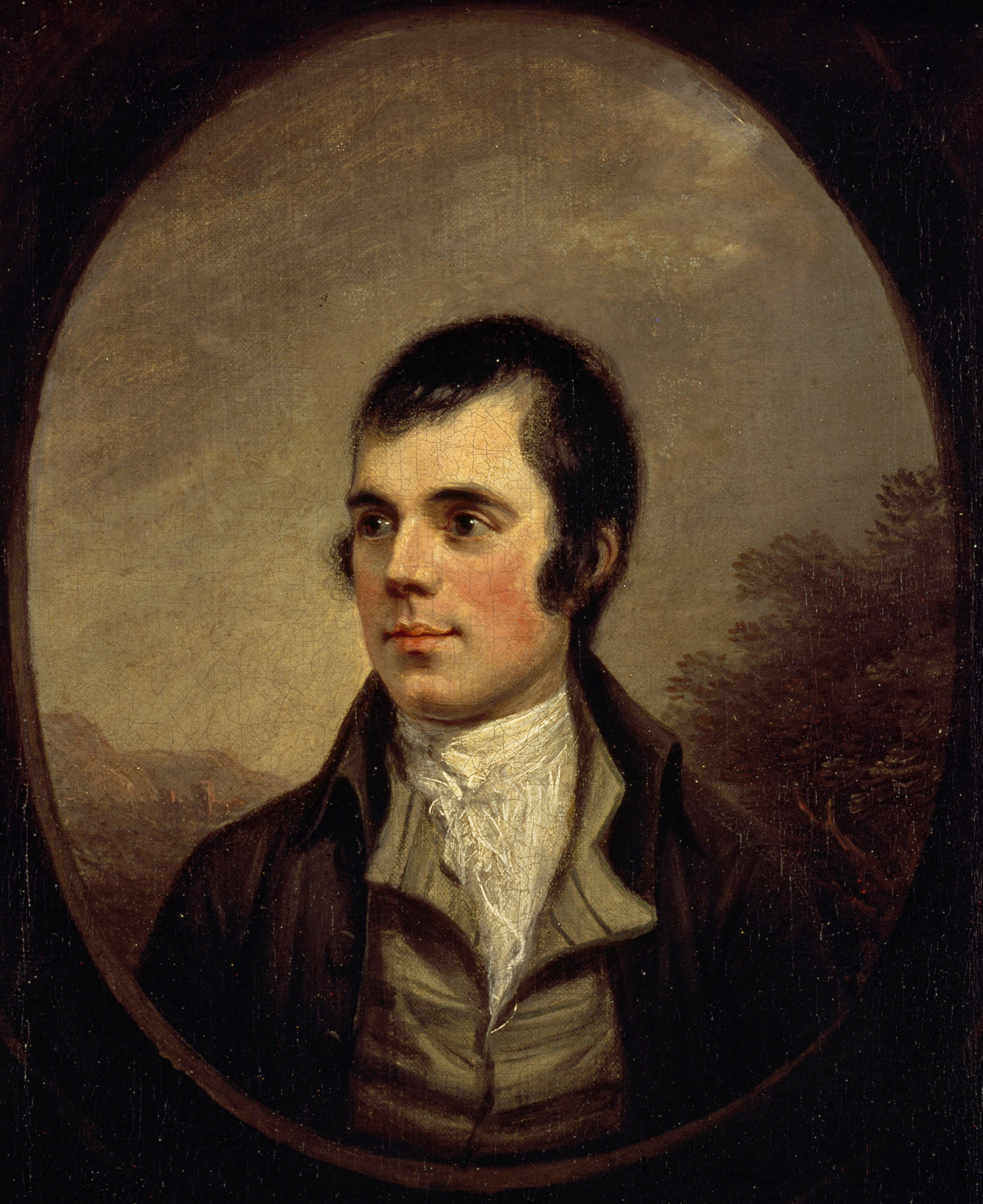
Full view of the Naysmith portrait of 1787, Scottish National Portrait Gallery

She maintained she was the Annie of 'The Rigs o' Barley' although she married in the same year that the song was written. She was sometimes escorted by Burns to her father's house, from festive gatherings in the neighbourhood. The poet was said to have been passionately fond of her and indeed he made her a gift of a lock of his hair and one of the miniature paintings of himself which she treasured all of her life, together with the song. Burns himself is silent on the matter of the identity of the heroine.

The poet wrote "The Rigs o' Barley" quite early in his career with the chorus:

Corn rig, an barley rigs,
An' corn rigs are bonie, O,
O' I'll ne'er forget that happy night,
Amang the rigs wi' Annie, O.

The song starts :

It was upon a Lammas night,
When corn rigs are bonnie, O,
Beneath the moon's unclouded light
I held awa to Annie, O;
The time flew by, wi' tentless heed,
Till 'tween the late and early, O,
Wi' sma' persuasion she agreed,
To see me thro' the barley. O.

The song ends with:

I hae been blythe wi' Comrades dear;
I hae been merry drinking, O:
I hae been joyfu' gath'rin gear;
I hae been happy thinking, O:
But a' the pleasures e'er I saw,
Tho' three times doubl'd fairly, O,
That happy night was worth them a' ,
Amang the rigs o'barley, O.

It is said that Anne met the poet soon after the song was published in 1782 and said to him that she had not expected to be celebrated in print, to which he replied "Oh ay, I was just wanting to give you a cast among the lave!"

In 1817 she was asked if she remembered nights with Burns among the rigs o' barley and she said "No!", adding however that "I mind o' many a happy night wi' him, though."

== Micro-history ==
The rigs referred to in the song were the traditional drainage system which was based on dividing fields into ridges around three feet high, and then ploughing them from end to end, the resulting furrows then drained excess water from the land above it, here planted with corn.

== See also ==
- Jean Armour
- Lesley Baillie
- Alison Begbie
- Nelly Blair
- May Cameron
- Mary Campbell (Highland Mary)
- Jenny Clow
- Jean Gardner
- Jean Glover
- Helen Hyslop
- Kate Kemp
- Nelly Kilpatrick
- Jessie Lewars
- Elizabeth Paton
- Isabella Steven
- Peggy Thompson
