= Lesley Baillie =

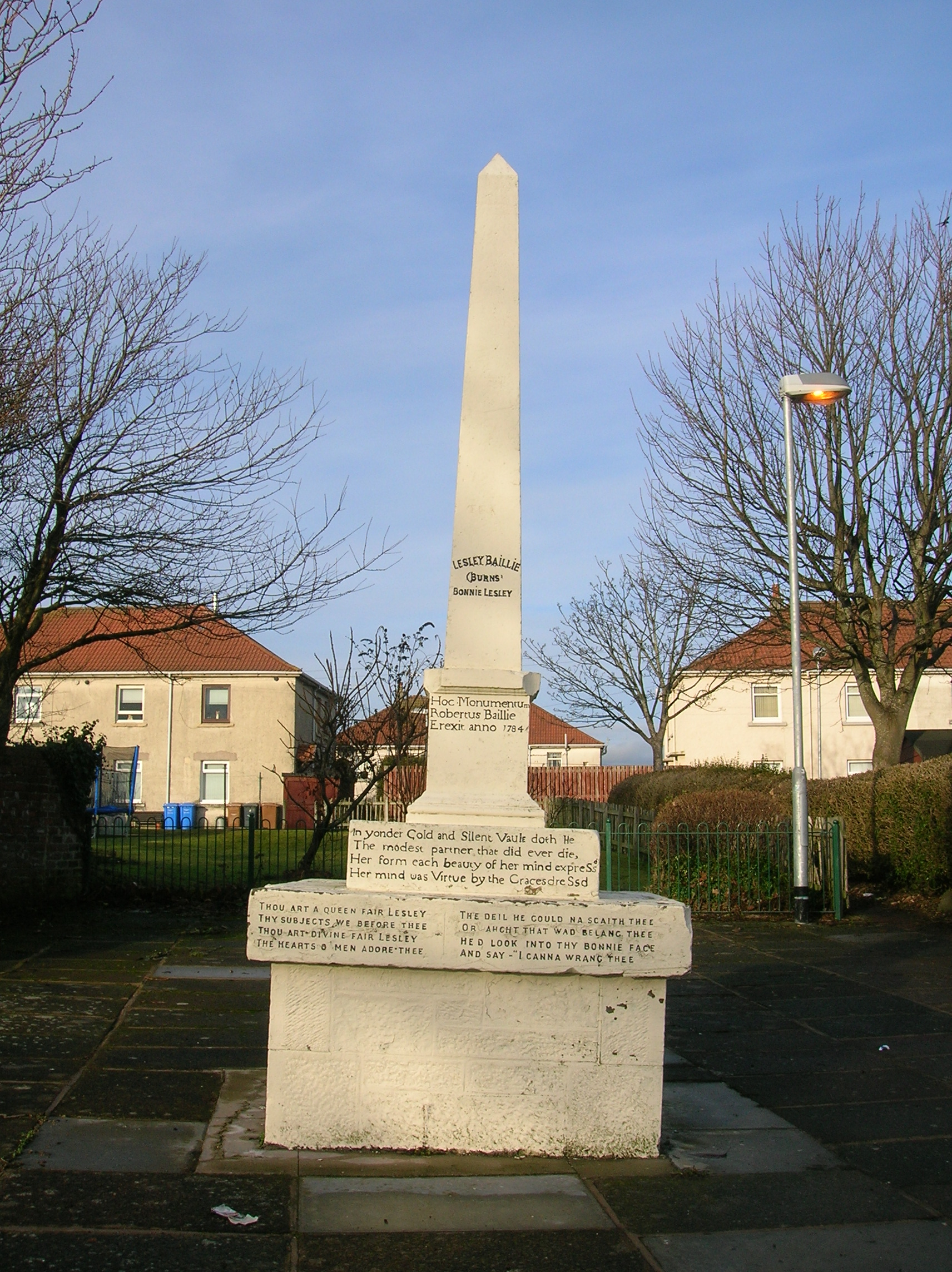
- Lesley Baillie's memorial
- Born: 6 March 1768; Mayfield House, Stevenston, Ayrshire, Scotland
- Died: 19 July 1843; Edinburgh, Scotland

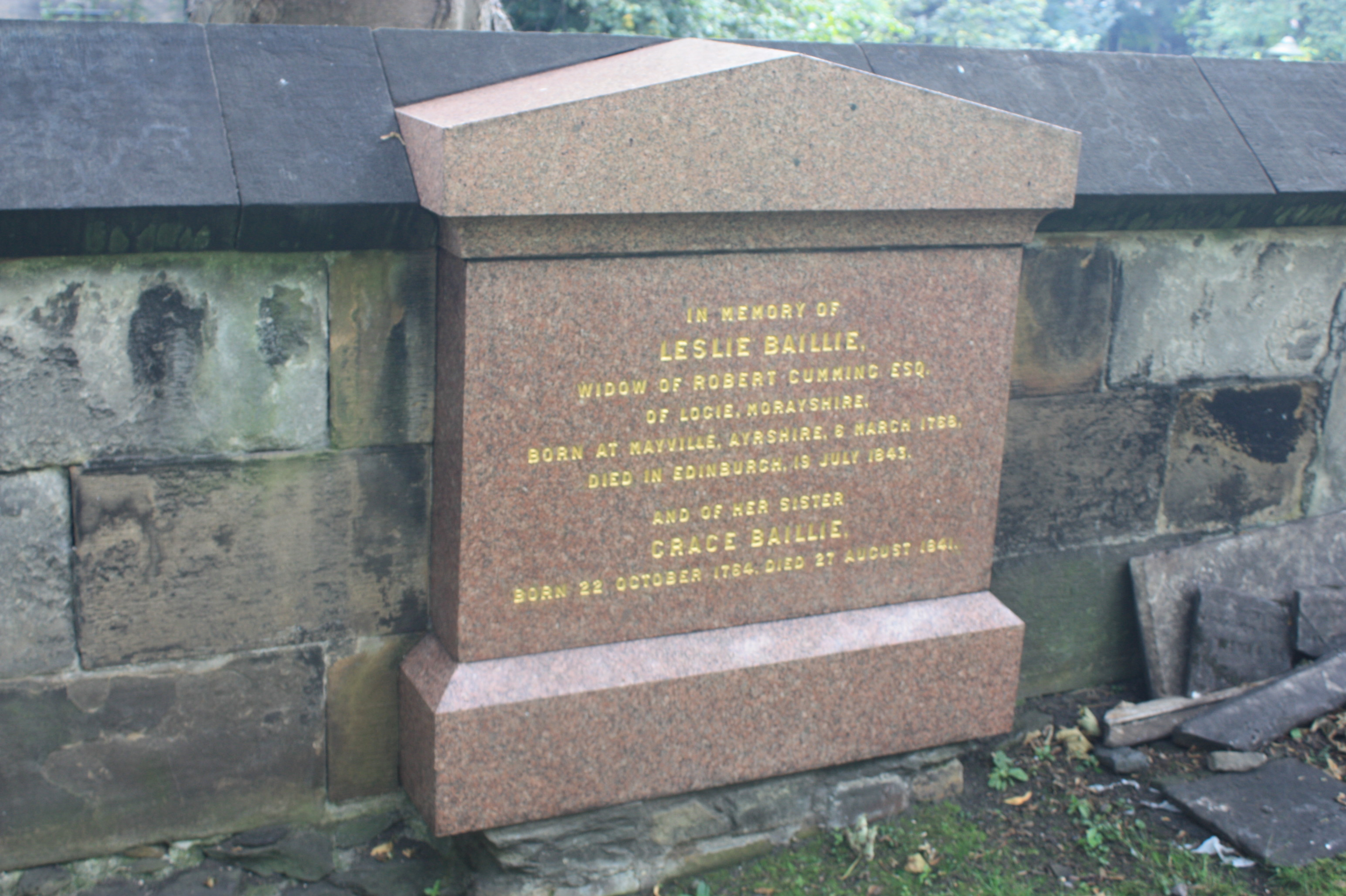
Grave of Lesley Baillie, "Bonnie Lesley", St Johns, Edinburgh

Lesley Baillie (1768–1843), later Mrs Lesley Cumming, was born at Mayville, Stevenston, Ayrshire. She was a daughter of Robert Baillie and married Robert Cumming of Logie, Moray. Her lasting fame derives from being Robert Burns's 'Bonnie Lesley', "the most beautiful, elegant woman in the world". On her tombstone her name is given as Leslie Baillie.

== Life and character ==
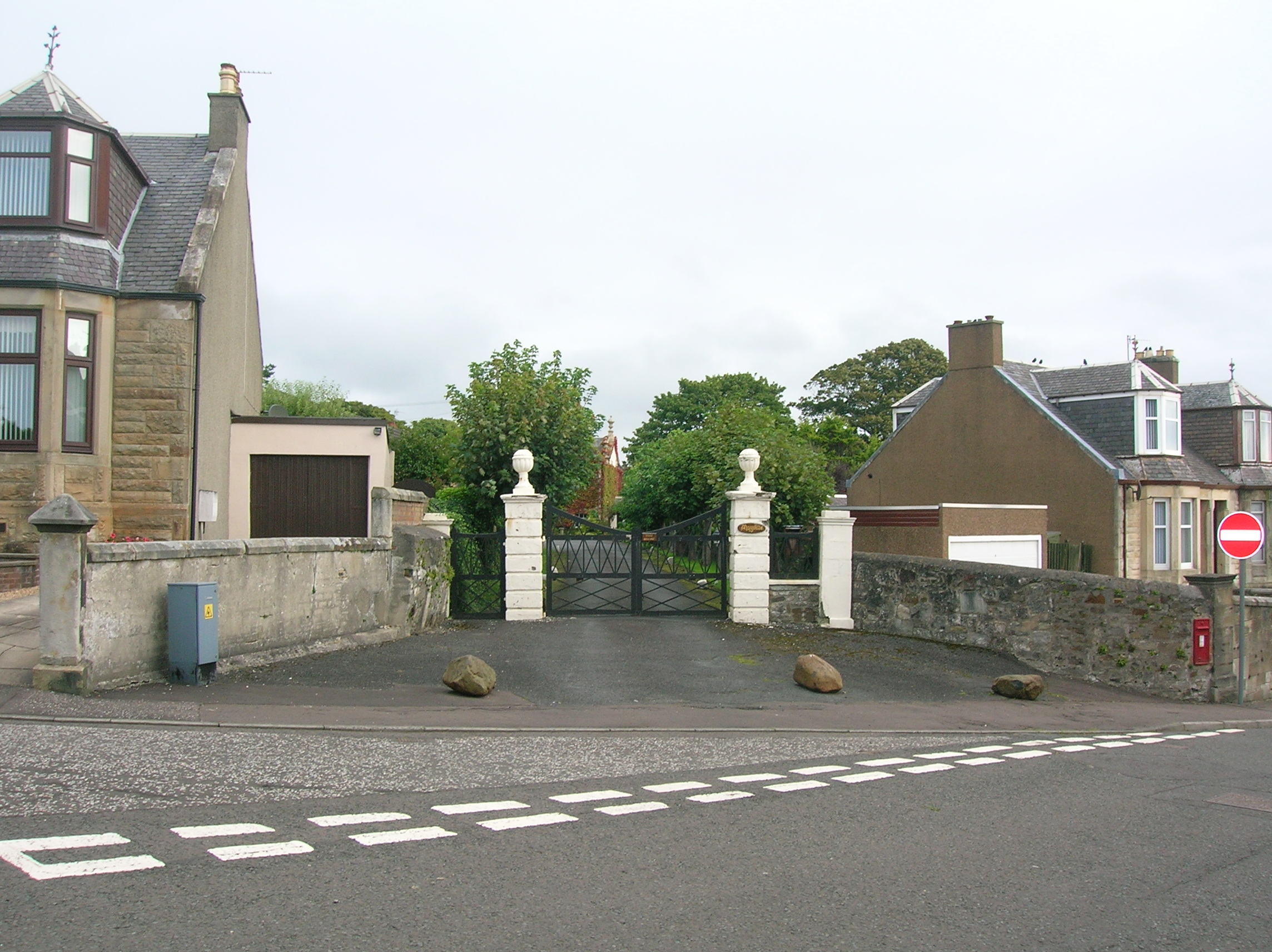
The entrance to Mayville House.

The daughter of sea captain Robert Baillie of Mayfield, she married Robert Cumming of Logie, Moray in 1799. She had a sister named Maria (Grace) and her mother was May Reid. She was a granddaughter of Anna Cunninghame and John Reid, second son of the minister of the parish, their daughter being her mother. Through her mother she was related to Sir Robert Cunninghame of Auchenharvie.

In 1799 Lesley married Robert Cumming of Logie, Morayshire. Lesley had six children of whom four sons died on army service in India. Her husband predeceased her by a good many years. Her character was much esteemed for her benevolence of character, kindness of disposition and agreeable manners.

Mayville House in Schoolwell Street is described as an "exceptionally attractive and delightful little mansion", built around 1720 for Robert Baillie and named for his wife, May Reid. The property became part of the Kerelaw Estate until sold by Mr James Campbell, a Saltcoats lawyer, in 1914. A Coal Merchant, John Alexander of Stevenston. It has pediments with urns and a sundial dated 1773.

In later life, described as "Mrs Cumming of Logie" she lived at 6 Hope Street, just off Charlotte Square in Edinburgh. She died on 19 July 1843 and is buried around 100m from her home in St John's on Princes Street.

Lesley Baillie was a descendant of the family who had owned the Orangefield estate John Dalrymple owned Orangefield in the time of Robert Burns. Lesley was buried in the graveyard of St John's on Princes Street, Edinburgh in one of the lower eastern terraces. Her sister Grace Baillie is buried with her.

"The owner of a pleasant spot
Near sandy wilds"

== The Lesley Baillie Memorial ==
This memorial, was originally erected in 1784 by Robert Baillie as a memorial to his wife May Reid and his other daughter Grace (Maria), is nowadays located between Sinclair Street and Glencairn Street, near the site of Mayfield House in Stevenston. It was originally situated in an area known as the 'Monument Park' near Kerelaw Mains Farm. Lesley's name was added in 1929 when the monument was re-erected on its present site by members of the Burns Federation after it had been derelict for over 50 years. It is now maintained by North Ayrshire Council.

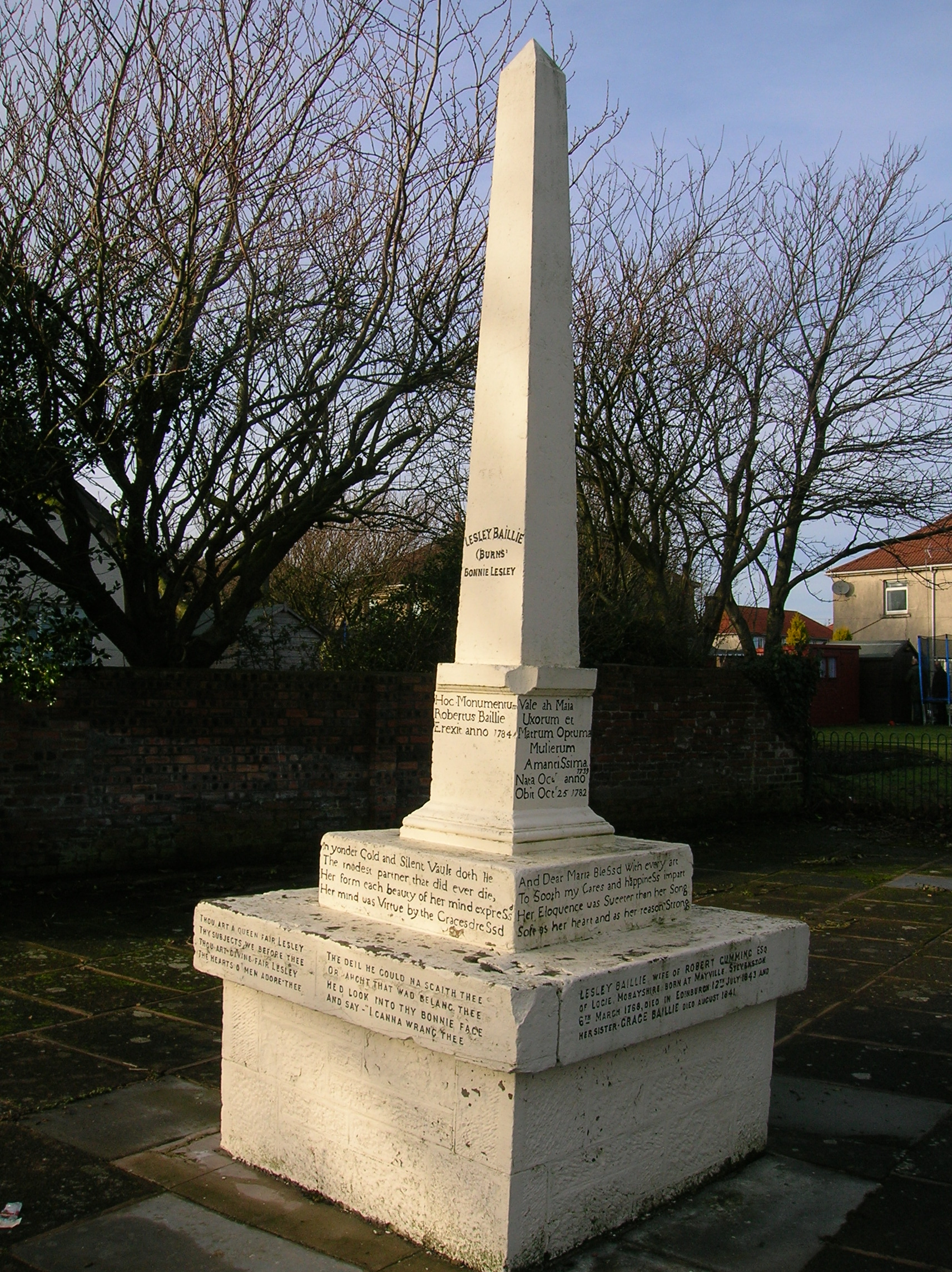
South facing side and inscriptions

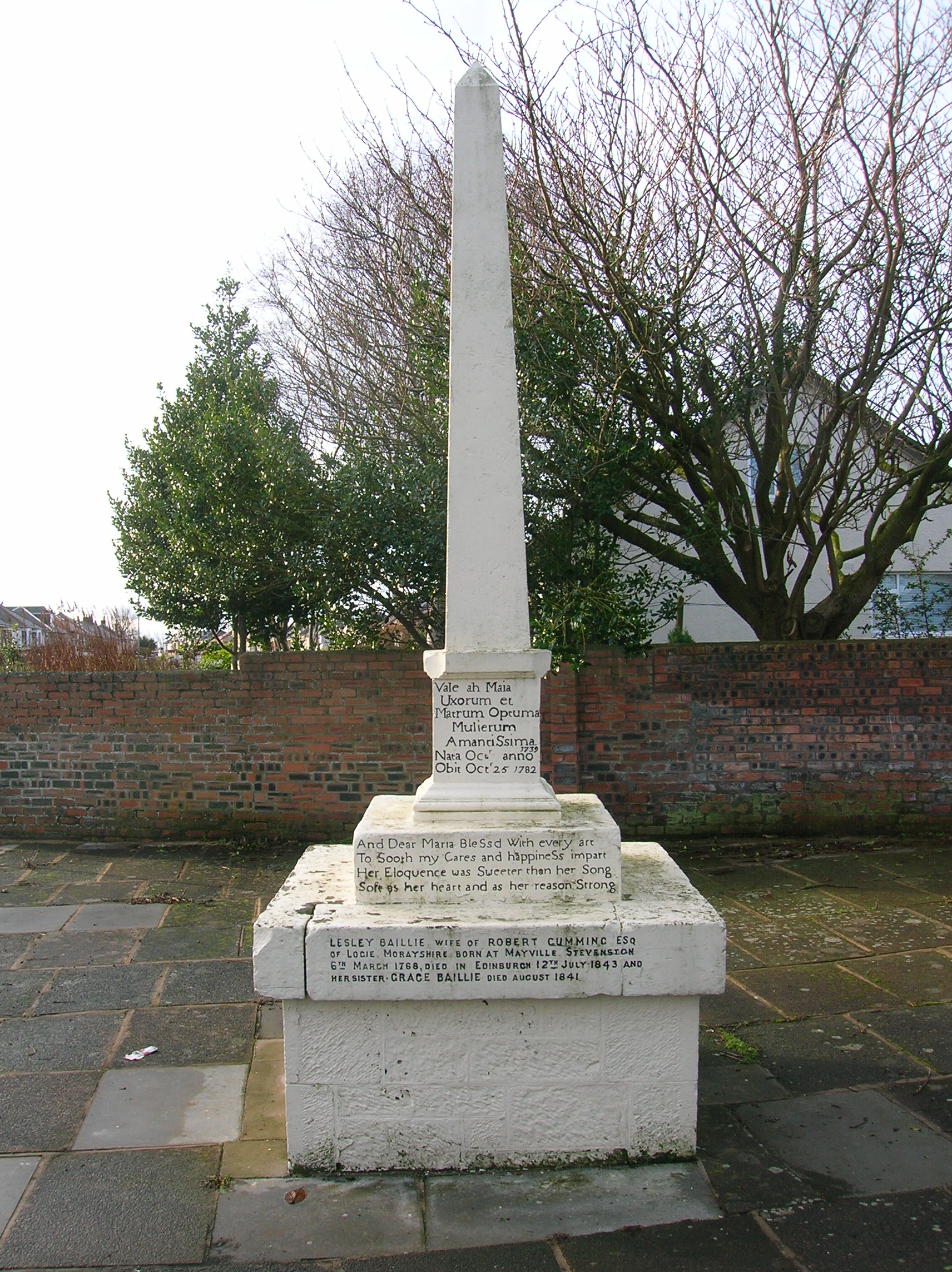
East facing side

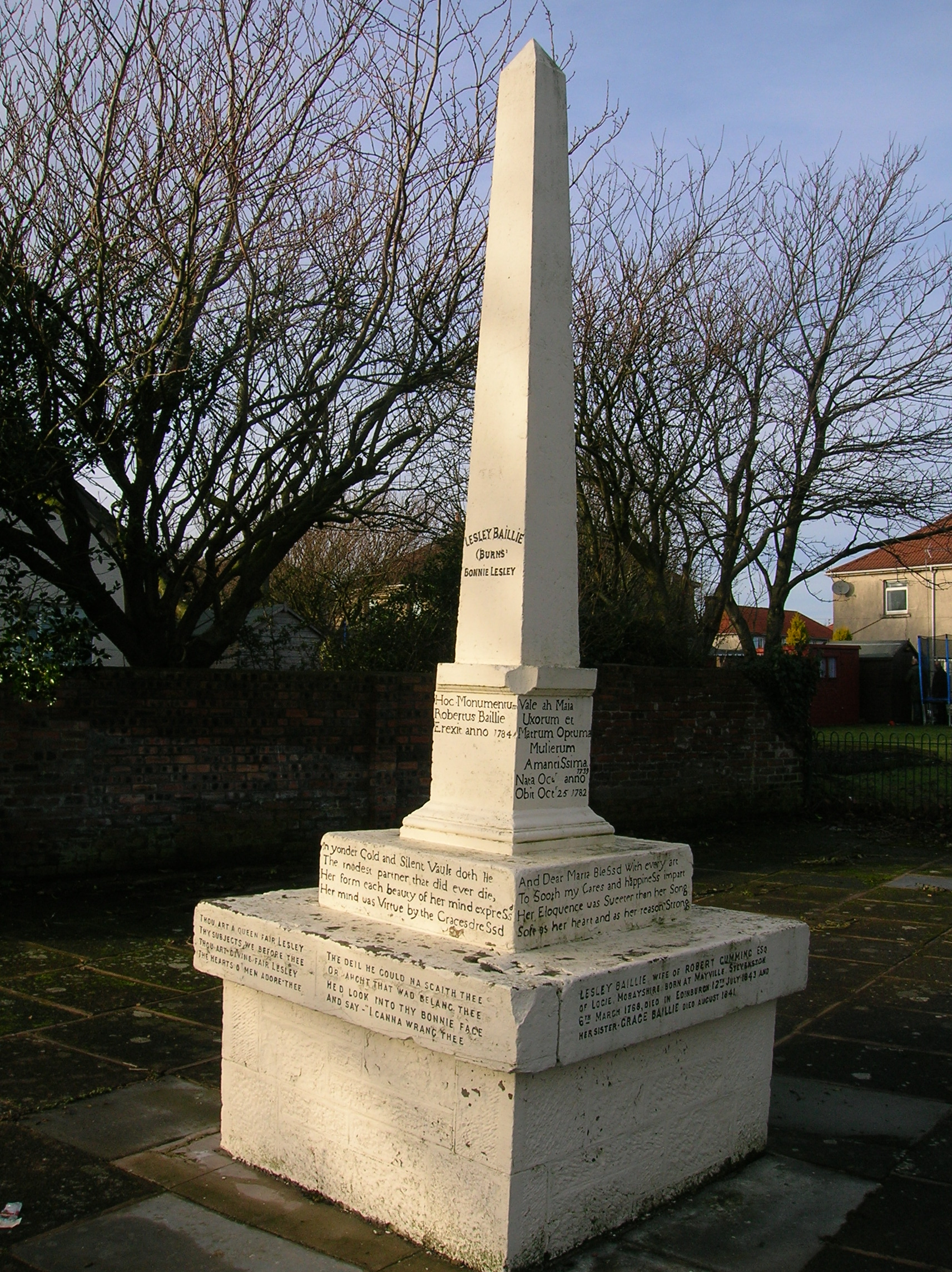
General view

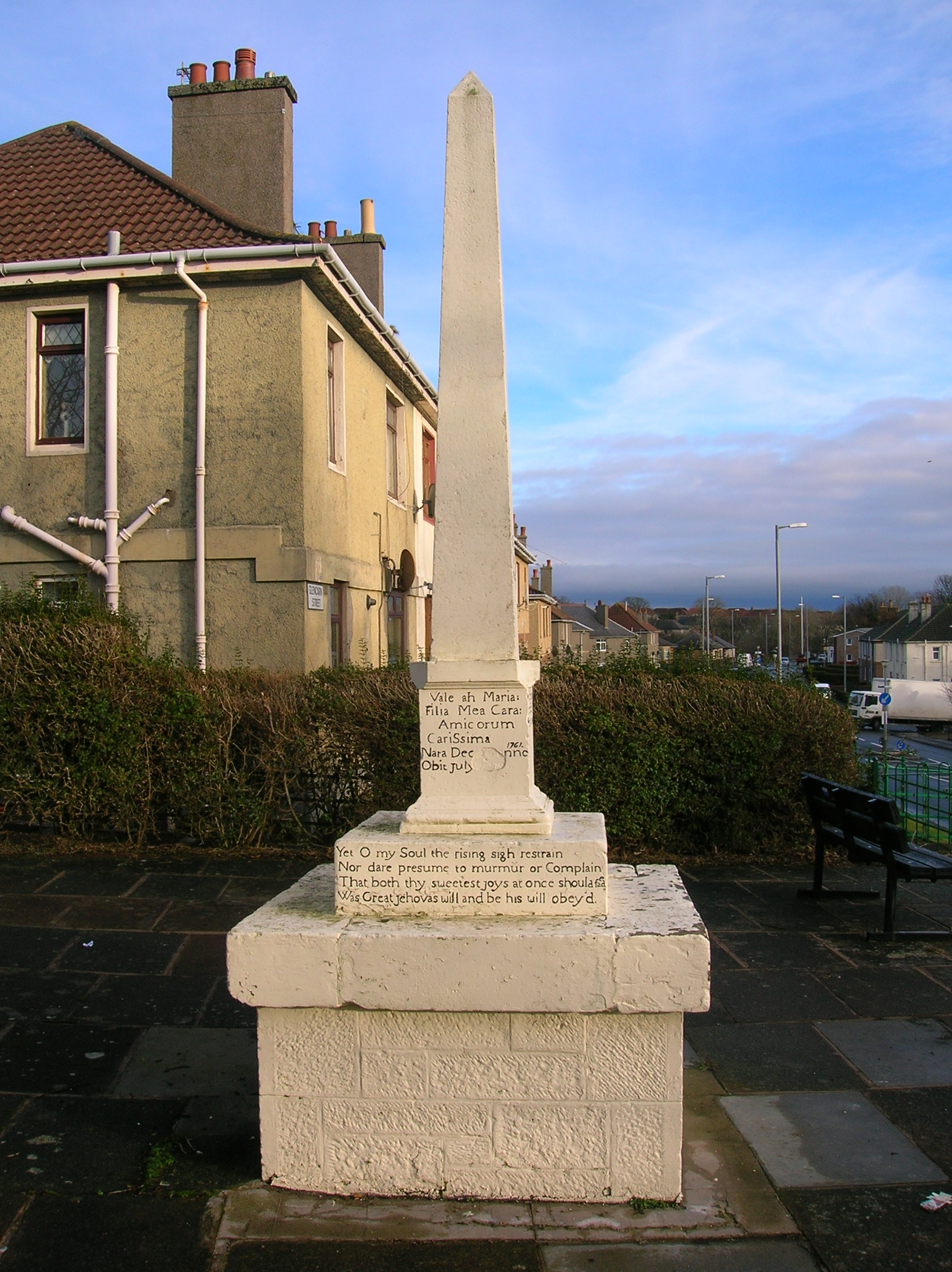
West facing side

Part of the inscription on the memorial to Maria Baillie reads:

In yonder Cold and Silent Vault doth lie
The modest partner that did ever die,
Her form each beauty of her mind expressd
Her mind was virtue by the Graces dressd

== Association with Robert Burns ==
The circumstances of Burns's association with Miss Baillie are related in a letter the poet wrote Mrs Dunlop from 'Annan Waterfoot' on 22 August 1792. he declared himself to be "in love, souse! Over head and ears, deep as the most unfathomable abyss of the boundless ocean", Burns explained that Mr Baillie with his two daughters, Grace and Lesley, was passing through Dumfries on their way to England, and did him the honour of visiting him. Although he was busy at the time he rode with them for some distance, dining and spending the whole day with them. He went on to say "Twas about nine, I think when I left them; and riding home I composed the following ballad... You must know that there is an old ballad beginning with":

My bonie Lizie Bailie,
I'll rowe thee in my plaidie etc. —

Burns parodied it as:

The bonie Lesley Bailie,
O she's gaen o'er the Border;
She's gaen, like Alexander,
To spread her conquests farther...

To see her is to love her,
And love but her for ever;
For nature made her what she is,
And never made anither!

On 8 November 1792 Burns sent the song to George Thomson with a comment on how it should got to the tune of "The Collier's Bony Dochter". Thomson replied, making suggestions for certain alterations, however, Burns wrote from Dumfries on 1 December, saying, "I must not, cannot alter, Bonie Lesley". He added the revealing comment: "that species of stanza is the most difficult that I have ever tried."

Burns was extremely proud of this song, and he remarked that it was "one of the finest songs I ever made in my life." He never saw Lesley Baillie again, however he wrote to her from Dumfries in May 1793, enclosing "Blythe hae I been on yon hill", a song he had composed for her. He thought highly of this song, sending it to Thomson matched to a slowed-down reel, "The Quaker's Wife", which came from Bremner's Reels, 1759.

According to Lesley, daughter of 'Bonnie Lesley', Burns was working on the last verse of a "Lament for James, Earl of Glencairn" and was having difficulty with a request from the Earl's sisters that 'gude' should be replaced with 'great'. Lesley suggested that neither should be used and this resulted in an ideal compromise, namely "I'll remember thee, Glencairn, and a' that thou hast done for me."

Writing in June 1793 to Deborah Duff Davies, Burns remarked; "When I sing of Miss Davies or Miss Lesley Bailie, I have only to feign the passion – the charms are real."

His feelings towards Lesley Baillie are seen as a revealing comment on his ability to imagine himself in love with any woman on the slightest pretext.

== See also ==
- Jean Armour
- Alison Begbie
- Mary Campbell (Highland Mary)
- Nelly Kilpatrick
- Jessie Lewars
- Mary Morison
- Ann Park
- Anne Rankine
- Isabella Steven
- Peggy Thompson
