= David Sillar =

Scottish farmer, poet, grocer, schoolteacher and baillie

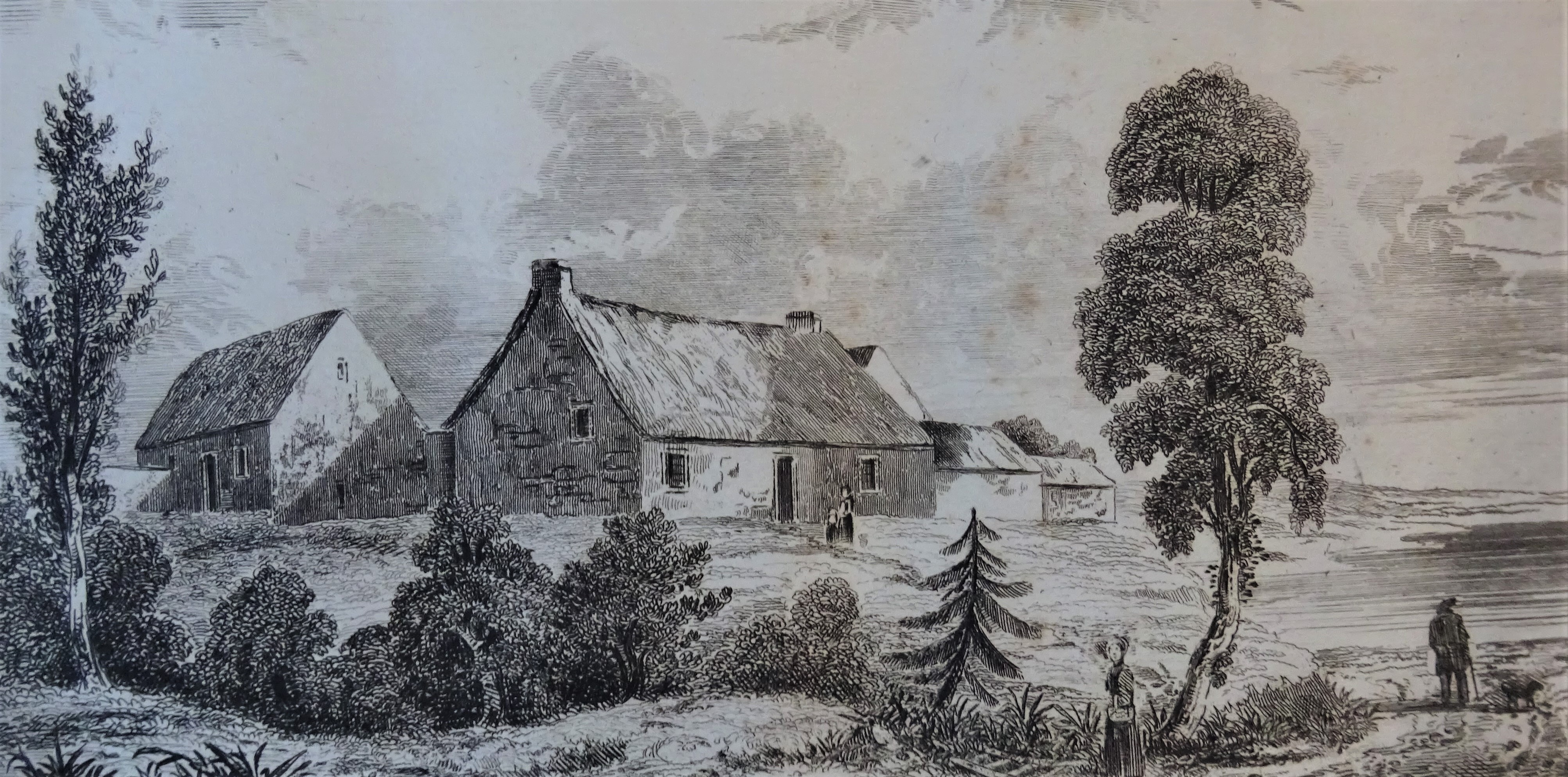
- Spittleside Farm, Tarbolton
- Born: 1760; Spittalside, Tarbolton, Scotland
- Died: 2 May 1830 (aged 69–70); Irvine, North Ayrshire, Scotland
- Occupations: Farmer, teacher, poet, grocer, and, baillie

David Sillar (1760–1830) was a Scottish farmer, poet, grocer, schoolteacher and baillie who was a close friend of the poet Robert Burns. He died in 1830, aged 70, after a long illness, and was buried in Irvine's Old Parish Church cemetery. His eroded gravestone was replaced by a facsimile thanks to the Irvine Burns Club. He married twice and had only one son survive him, a Dr. Zachary Sillar M.D. of Liverpool. His father was Patrick Sillar, tenant farmer at Spittalside near Tarbolton, Ayrshire. He first married a widow, Mrs Margaret Kerr, née Gemmell shortly after moving to Irvine and had seven children and his second wife was the sister of John Bryan of the Sun Inn, Kilmarnock.

== Life and character ==
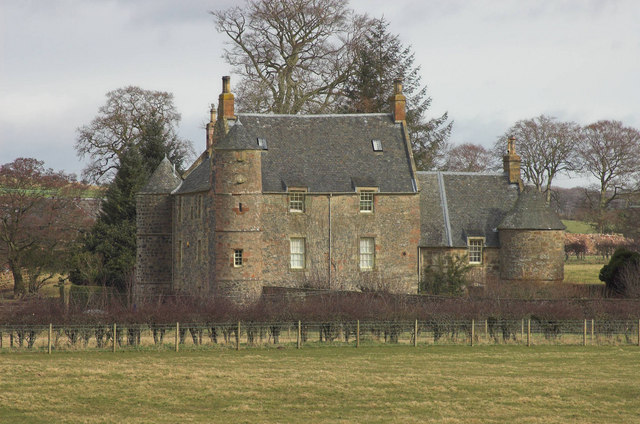
Stair House where David Sillar courted Peggy Orr.

David was the third son of four, his father being Patrick Sillar, farmer at Spittalside (NS 425 277) near Tarbolton, close to the Burns family farm at Lochlea. His brother William took on the lease of the farm and his elder brothers Robert and John became merchants, trading with Africa after Robert had left the soap works at Ayr where James Gibb had employed him.

David was self-taught, however he still managed to be appointed as a temporary teacher at Tarbolton, the permanent position however went to one John Wilson of Death and Doctor Hornbrook fame. Wilson had taught at Craigie. Sillars response was to establish an 'adventure school', unsuccessfully, at Commonside (NS 415 244), which lies between Annbank and Tarbolton. After this setback Sillar moved to Irvine in 1783 where he established himself as a grocer under the old Irvine Tolbooth and after bankruptcy in 1791 spent a short spell actually in the Tolbooth, the debtors jail. It is recorded that he wrote to one of his two elder and successful businessmen brothers to ask for a loan of the £5 he needed to keep out of debtor's jail, but was denied. This incident had a lasting effect on him, despite the wealth he later acquired.

He had once again tried his hand in 1784 as a teacher in Irvine, setting up a school of navigation in East Back Road, with however the same result as before. Makinson however records that this navigation school was very successful, providing him with an income of around £100 per annum, Irvine being a busy port at the time. In 1797 he unsuccessfully applied for a job as a teacher of English in Irvine.

David recorded his move to Irvine in rhyme :-

:"It is twa years an' something mair
:Sin I left Kyle i' this same shire,
:And cam tae trade, an' think an' fare
:Like other men,
:Side Irvine's banks and country fair
:O' Cunningham".

After this series of setbacks fate played a positive hand and he was fortunate enough to inherit a fortune (between £30,000 and £40,000) from an uncle, a partner in Sillar and Henderson, a Liverpool mercantile company. Makinson states that the fortunes were actually inherited from his elder brothers Robert (died 1811) and John who had been very successful in trading between Liverpool and Africa, had not married and both died young. David also had a younger brother William who died young and left him a considerable sum of money together with the lease of Spittalside Farm. David's wife ran the farm and he ran his school, returning to work in the fields at the end of each week.

After gaining financial security he went on to become a councillor and later on a baillie or magistrate in Irvine. His unsuccessful grocer shop was located near the old tolbooth, however after receiving the substantial inheritance he bought various properties, including a block of four houses, north of the cross, on the west side of High Street and in 1814 a house at Kirkgatehead. He is not recorded as having been a generous benefactor, possibly due to his experiences in life. He outlived all his family apart from his son who lived in Liverpool.

David both played the dulcimer and also the fiddle for which he composed. The air "A Rosebud by My Early Walk" was composed by him and was sent by Burns to be included in Johnson's Musical Museum.

Margaret or Peggy Orr was a nurserymaid at Stair House and Robert Burns is said to have lent a hand as a 'blackfoot' or 'black soles' with his courtship of this lady, however the engagement was brief and she later married John Paton, an Edinburgh shoemaker and died there in 1837. Her brother John was one of the last members of the Tarbolton Bachelors Club. In his first 'Epistle to Davie' entitled 'An Epistle to Davy, a Brother-Poet, Lover, Ploughman and Fiddler, Burns wrote :-

:There's a' the pleasures o' the heart,
:The lover an' the frien' ,
:You hae your Meg,
:your dearest part,
:And I my darling Jean.

Catherine Stewart of Stair and later Afton Lodge became aware of 'Robert Burns the poet' through his visits with David and she was the first member of the upper classes to acknowledge his ability and befriend him.

== Association with Robert Burns ==
David was a year younger than Robert and was probably Burns's closest friend, his Dainty Davie during his Lochlea days. They probably first met in 1780 or early in 1781.

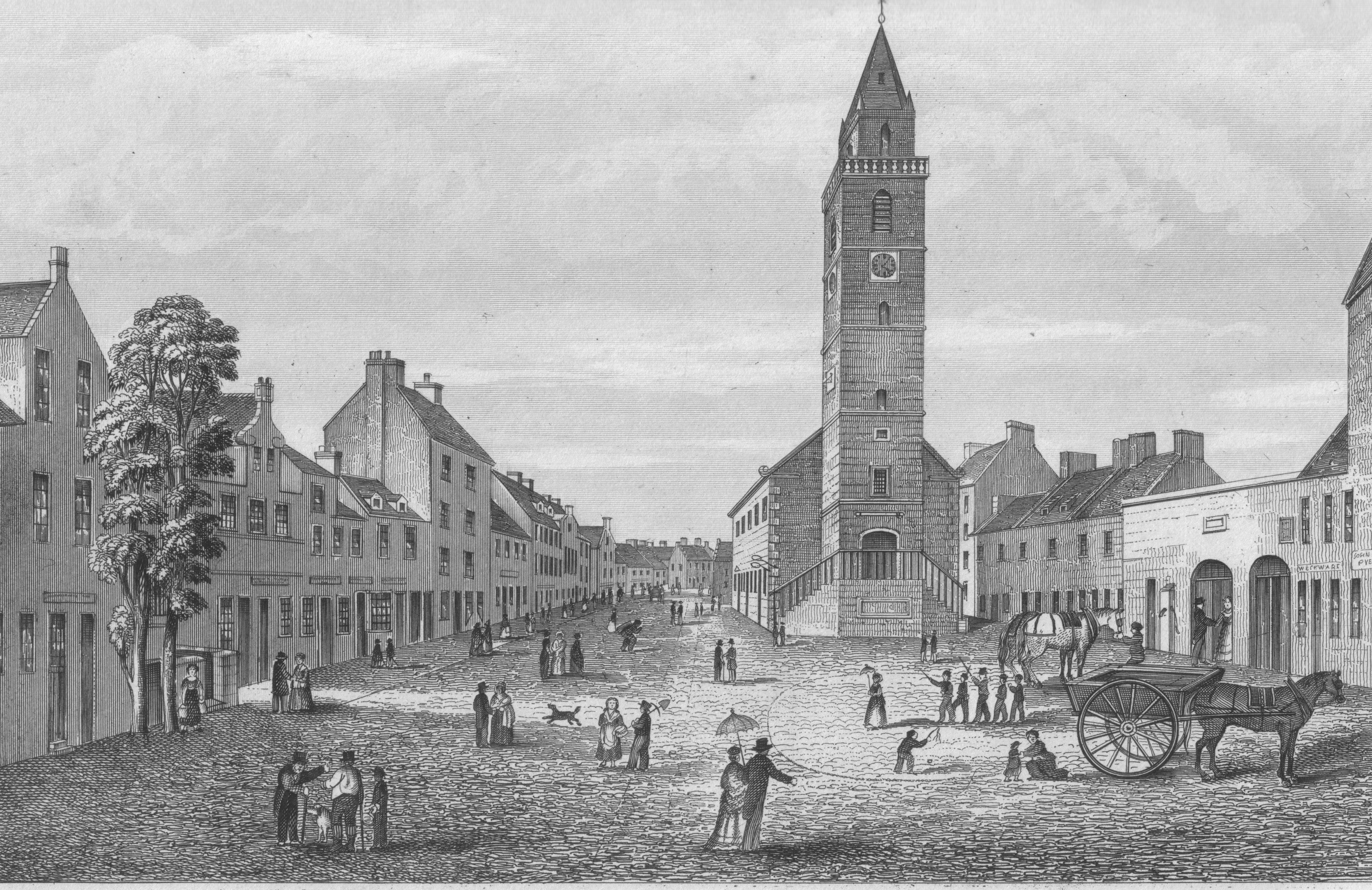
Irvine High Street and the old Tolbooth.

David Sillar has left us with an important description of Robert Burns during his time at Tarbolton :-

Mr Robert Burns was some time in the parish of Tarbolton prior to my acquaintance with him. His social disposition easily procured him acquaintance; but a certain satirical seasoning, with which he and all poetical geniuses are in some degree influenced, while it set the rustic circle in a roar, was not unaccompanied by its kindred attendant – suspicious fear. I recollect hearing his neighbours observe he had a great deal to say for himself, and that they suspected his principles. He wore the only tied hair in the parish; and in the church, his plaid, which was of a particular colour, I think fillemot, he wrapped in a particular manner round his shoulders. These surmises, and his exterior, had such a magical influence on my curiosity, as made me particularly solicitious of his acquaintance. Whether my acquaintance with Gilbert was casual or premeditated, I am not now certain. By him I was introduced not only to his brother, but to the whole of that family, where, in a short time, I became a frequent, and, I believe, not unwelcome visitant.

Of his friendship with David records that :-

After the commencement of my acquaintance with the bard, we frequently met on Sundays at church, when, between sermons, instead of going with our friends or lassies to the inn, we often took a walk in the fields. In these walks I have frequently been struck by his facility in addressing the fair sex; and many times, when I have been bashfully anxious how to express myself, he would have entered into conversation with them with the greatest ease and freedom; and it was generally a death-blow to our conversation, however agreeable, to meet a female acquaintance.

He was not a founder member of the Tarbolton Bachelor Club, however he joined in 1781 and a holograph copy of the rules of the club inn his hand survives.

He was a correspondent with Burns after he left Tarbolton in 1785 and was also the subject of two poems by Robert, namely the 'Epistle(s) to Davie.'

In the summer of 1791 David was forced, probably due to his failing grocery business, to write and ask Burns for a loan, however the poet was not in a position to help, being just five shillings rich at present.

In August 1791 Burns' wrote from Ellisland to David, who had clearly recently become a married man.

In 1826 he was a founder member and first vice-president of the Irvine Burns Club. John MacKenzie (doctor) was the first president. In 1925 Provost R. M. Hogg organised the presentation to the Irvine Burns Club of the chairs used by Dr John MacKenzie and David Sillar as councillors in celebration of the club's centenary.

=== Alexander Tait ===
Sillar and Burns new the local character 'Sawney Tait' well but they insulted Tait's poetry, Sillar comparing Alexander's poetic muse to ".. a tumbling cart, wantin' shoon'". This refers to a type of cart with an ungreased tree axle and no iron tyres, infamous for the almost intolerable screeching sound they made. Tait wrote of Sillar in response that "There's nane can sound the bawdy horn, like you and Burns.", highlighted the pairs mutual enjoyment of bawdry pursuits.

Another retaliatory work was "Sillar and Tait; or, Tit for Tat"

My pipe wi'wind I maun gae fill'er,
And play a tune to Davie Sillar;

Poems and Songs by Alexander Tait was published in 1790 and like Sillar's have achieved little or no acclaim.

=== Buchanites ===
On behalf of Mrs Stewart of Afton Lodge he attended two meetings held by the Buchanites and took notes on their beliefs and practices for which he was at first challenged by Mr Whyte, however upon inspection it was accepted that the notes were fair and accurate. A link exists here with Robert Burns who had knowledge of the Buchanites and one Jean Gardner, a disciple of the sect.

=== Poetry ===
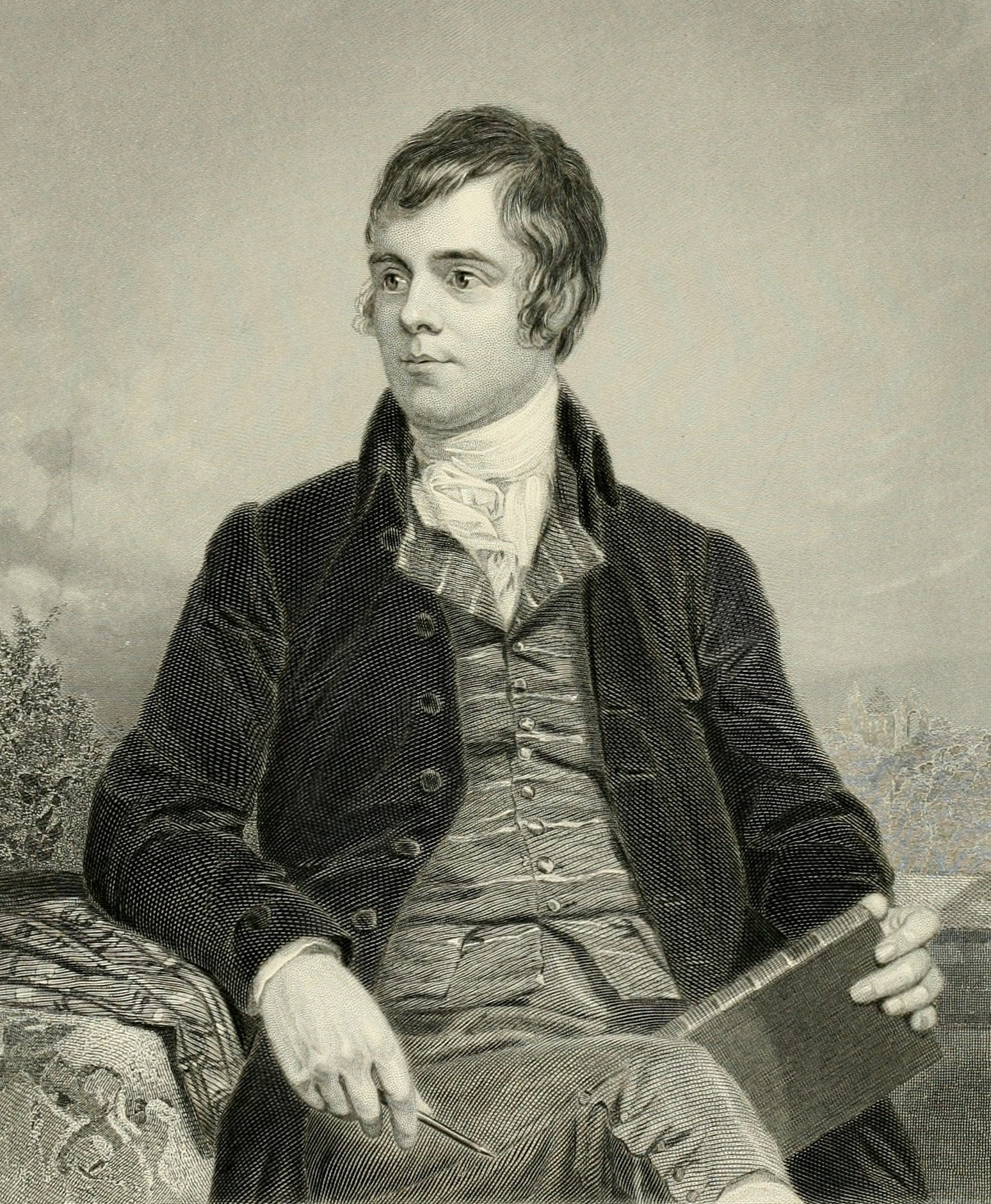
Robert Burns

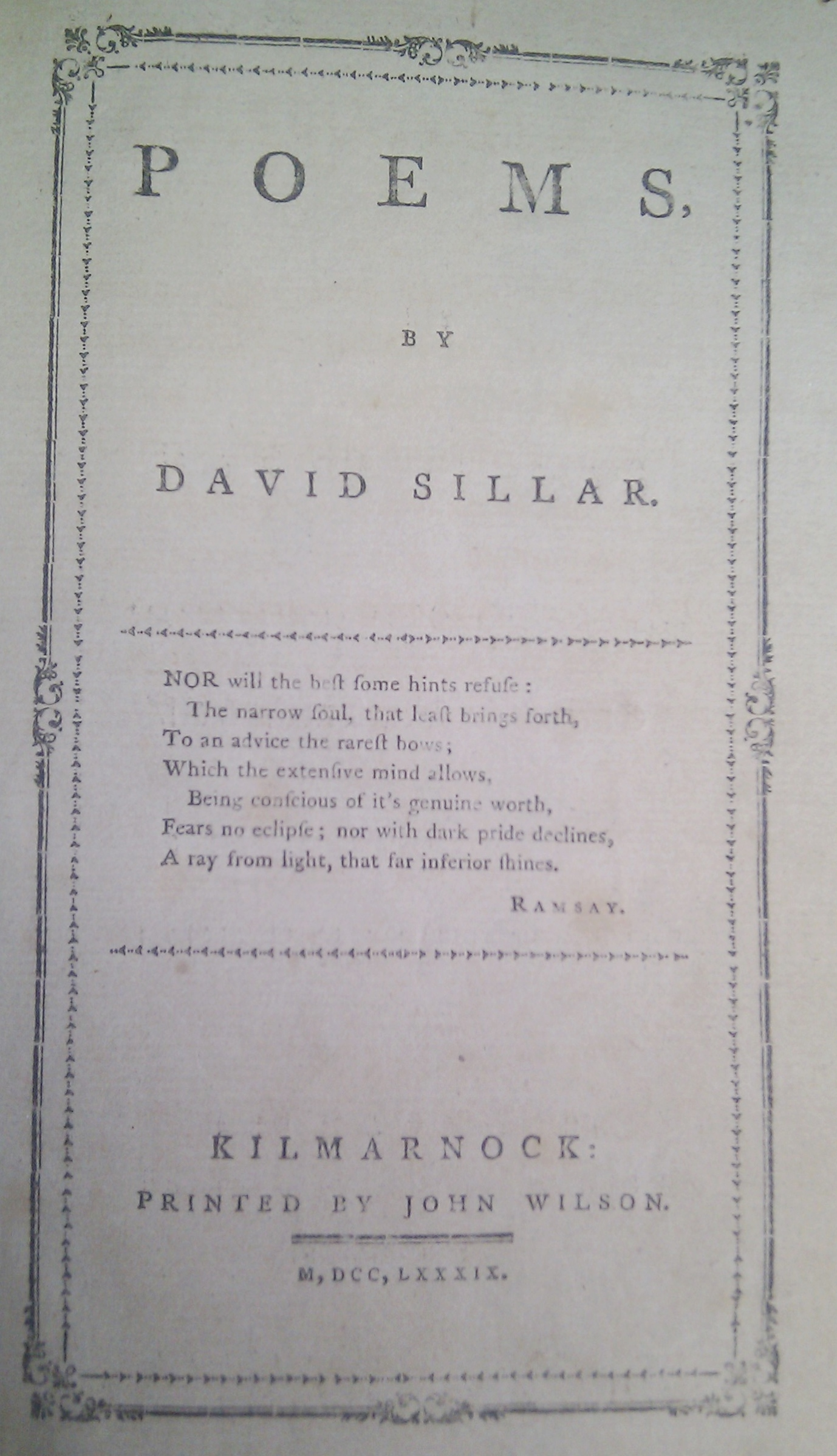
The title page of David Sillar's published poems.

In 1789 David published a volume of poetry titled 'Poems' that was 247 pages long, using Robert's printer, John Wilson of Kilmarnock and dedicated to Hugh Montgomery, Esq of Skelmorlie. He was assisted in the sale of his poems by his friend who wrote to him on 22 January 1790, enclosing £2 4S 0d from eleven subscribers to David's poems, a letter now in the possession of the Irvine Burns Club. Unfortunately the poems were mediocre and were not well received. Makinson comments that his poetry was ponderous, lacked humour and was somewhat coarse. It has been suggested that his later failure as a grocer in Irvine was in part related to the time he spent on composing poetry.

In his second 'Epistle to Davie' Burns wrote:-

Hale be your heart, hale be your fiddle;
Lang may your elbuck jink an' diddle,
Tae cheer you thro' the weary widdle
O' war'ly cares,
Till bairns' bairns kindly cuddle
Your auld, grey hairs.

But, Davie, lad, I'm red ye're glaikit;
I'm tauld the Muse ye hae negleckit;
An' gif it's sae, ye sud be licket
Until ye fyke;
Sic hauns as you sud ne'er be faikit,
Be hain't wha like.

The Irvine Burns Club possesses two original letters from Robert Burns to David Sillar, purchased by the club in 1975 from the Rev. David Sillar, Wetherby, Yorkshire, a great-great-grandson. Both letters were written from Ellisland, Dumfriesshire, and are dated 5 August 1789, and 22 January 1790. They are warm friendly letters and deal with Burns obtaining eleven subscribers for Sillar's own book 'Poems printed by John Wilson of Kilmarnock in 1789.

The Irvine Burns Club also possess a copy in Sillar's own handwriting of a speech partly in poetical form given by David Sillar, as vice-president of Irvine Burns Club at the inaugural celebration dinner in January 1828. The manuscript was presented to the club by his son Dr Zachariah Sillar, M.D., President of the Club 1830–31.

== Micro-history ==
David Sillar's subscribed to the Burns Monument at Alloway and was one of the first to do so. A tradition in Irvine has it that upon being asked to subscribe to a monument for his friend he said "I cannot do so. You starved him when alive, and you cannot with good grace erect a monument to him now." Makinson has it that Sillar said "No, no; ye starved the man when he was living among ye, and I refuse to join in useless expenditure now that he is dead."

David was the first on the members' list and Gilbert Burns was also a member of the Mauchline Conversation Society that met to discuss a wide range of topics such as moral questions, politics, etc.

He lent £4,000 to the daughter of Catherine Stewart of Stair House and to the Earl of Eglinton.

Thanks to his only recorded generous donations to Irvine Academy totalling £100 he was made a life Director of the school.

== See also ==
- Alison Begbie
- Elizabeth Paton
- Helen Hyslop
- Isabella Steven
- Jean Armour
- Jean Glover
- Jenny Clow
- Jessie Lewars
- Kate Kemp
- Lesley Baillie
- List of 18th-century British working-class writers
- Mary Campbell (Highland Mary)
- May Cameron
- Nelly Blair
- Nelly Kilpatrick
- Peggy Thompson
