= Mary Morison =

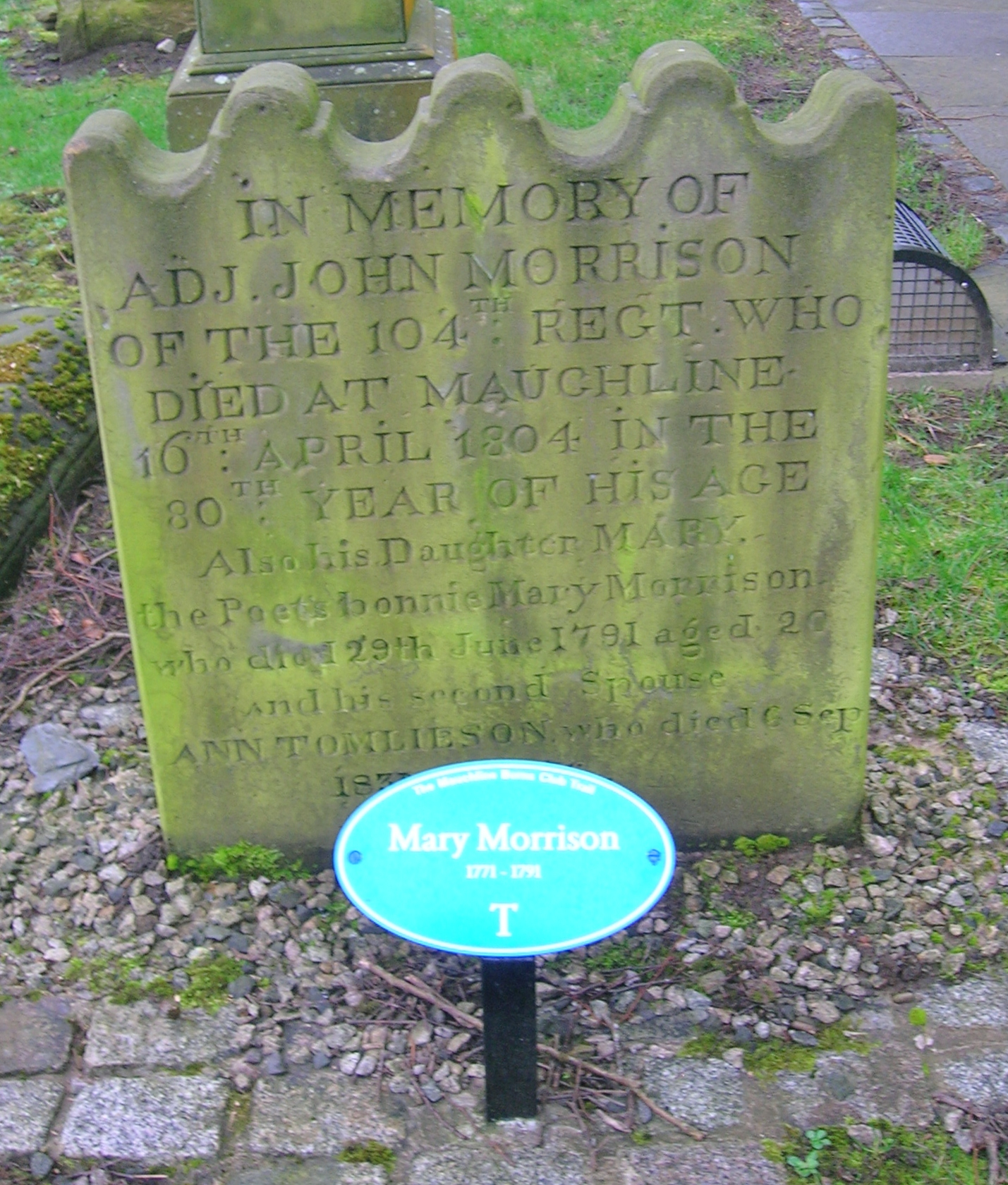
- The gravestone of Mary Morison at Mauchline
- Born: 1771; Mauchline, Scotland
- Died: 29 June 1791 (aged 19–20); Mauchline, Scotland

Mary Morison or Mary Morrison (1771 – 29 June 1791), may have been the "lovely Mary Morison", whom the poet Robert Burns admired as a girl of sixteen. She was the daughter of Adjutant John Morison of Mauchline.

Her tombstone carries the inscription - "In memory of Adjutant John Morison, etc., etc.; also his daughter - the poet's bonnie Mary Morison - who died 29th June, 1791, aged 20; and his second spouse etc.".

== Life and character ==
Morison died young, at the age of 20, being a victim of consumption in 1791. She is buried in Mauchline churchyard. Hunter records that she had a foot amputated after a horse-riding accident, therefore the cause of death may actually have been septicaemia.

She either lived at 'Brownlea' at the east side of Castle Street where it met with 'the Knowe', and the other is 'The Place', which was a tenement that stood to the east side of the Cross.

=== Association with Robert Burns ===
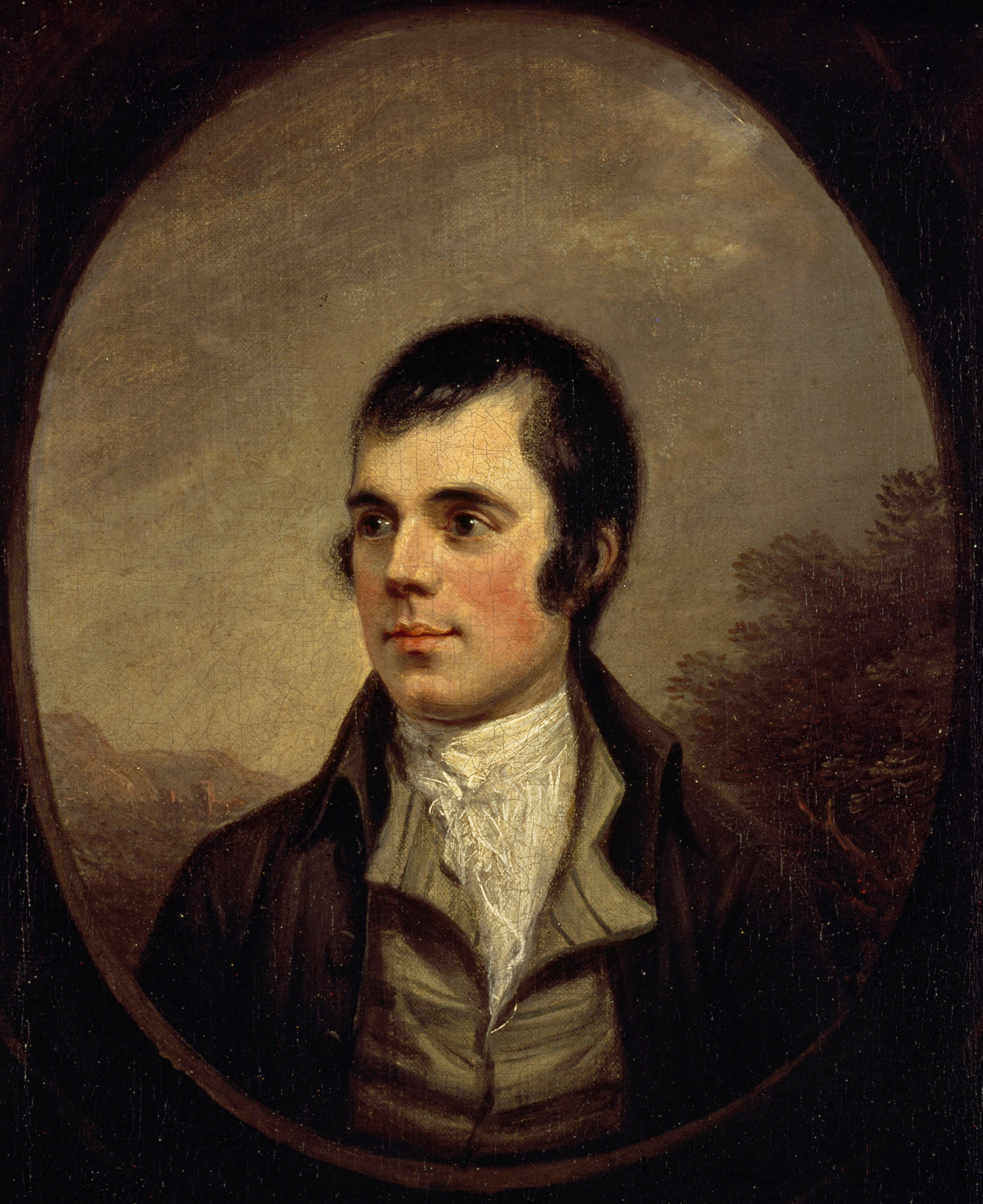
Full view of the Naysmith portrait of 1787, Scottish National Portrait Gallery

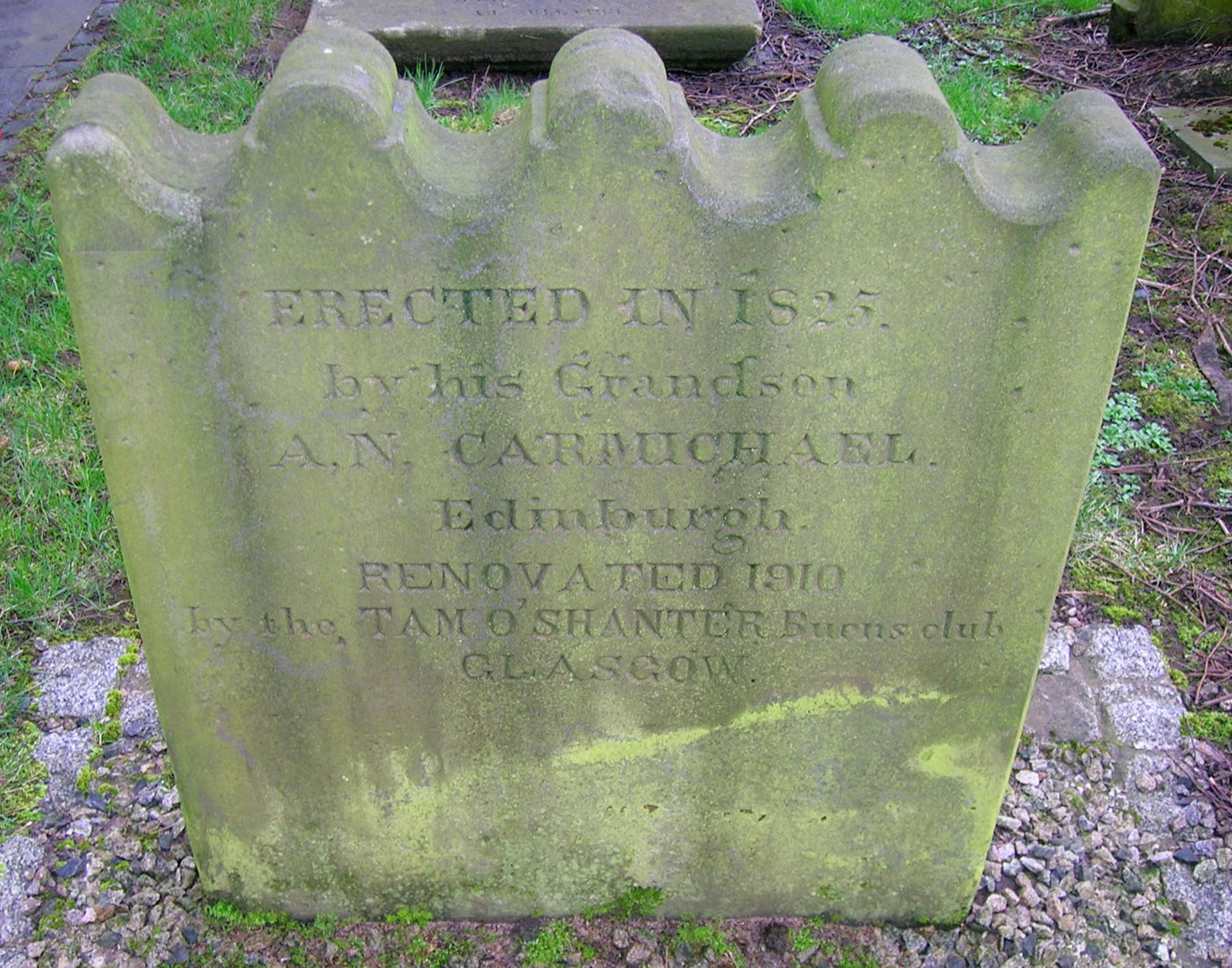
Reverse side inscription showing that the gravestone was erected many years after Mary and her father's deaths.

Mary's tombstone in the Mauchline churchyard, as stated, records that she was the daughter of Adjutant John Morison of the 104th Regiment and that she was Robert Burns's 'bonnie Mary' in his famous song 'Mary Morison'. In 1825 A. N. Carmichael erected the present tombstone in his aunt's memory, many years after her death.

Local tradition however records that she was not an intimate of the poet and may have actually met him only once during tea at a friend’s house. The Rev Dr Edgar of Mauchline is recorded to have said that Morison's sister thought that identity of the 'Mary' of the poem 'Mary Morison' was indeed her sibling. Most authorities feel that the name was used by Burns for Alison Begbie as he called the song 'one of my juvenile works', which he was unlikely to say about a song written in 1784/5 when the Mary would have been a girl of about fourteen and twelve years younger than Burns himself.

Gilbert, the poet's brother, related that Alison Begbie, Peggy Alison and Mary Morison were, all one and the same person, Alison Begbie. The poet, having had difficult in getting Alison Begbie's name to pair in rhyme had at first used the name 'Peggy Alison'.

'Mary Morison' was the finest of his early songs, written prior to The Kilmarnock Volume, but not included and only sent to George Thomson on 20 March 1793.

"O Mary, at thy window be,
It is the wish'd, the trysted hour!
Those smiles and glances let me see,
That make the miser's treasure poor.
How blythely wad I bide the stoure,
A weary slave frae sun to sun,
Could I the rich reward secure,
The lovely Mary Morison.

== See also ==
- Jean Armour
- Alison Begbie
- May Cameron
- Jean Gardner
- Nelly Kilpatrick
- Peggy Thompson
- Jenny Clow
