= Helen Hyslop =

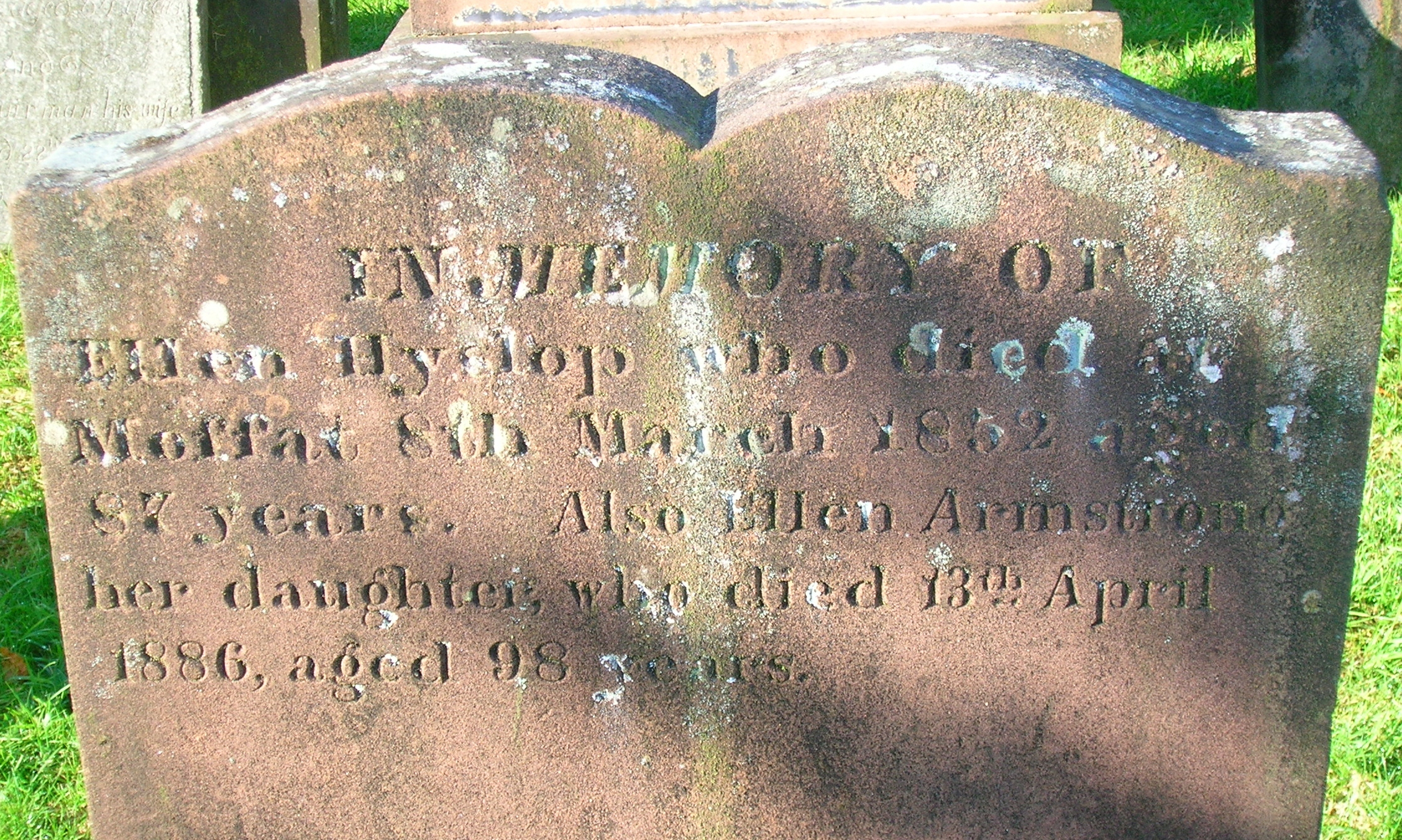
- Ellen Hyslop's Gravestone and inscription
- Born: March 1766; Langholm, Scotland
- Died: 8 March 1852, aged 87; Moffat, Scotland
- Occupation: Housewife

Helen Hyslop, also Nelly or Ellen Hyslop was a 'noted local beauty' in Moffat and a strong local tradition maintains that Robert Burns was for some time a great admirer of her and that she had an affair with him. A daughter, also Helen, is said to have been born as a result of this liaison. Parish records show that a Helen Hyslop, the mother of Burns's possible daughter, was born in the area in 1766, her parents being John Hyslop and Janet Howatson of Langholm.

== Associates ==
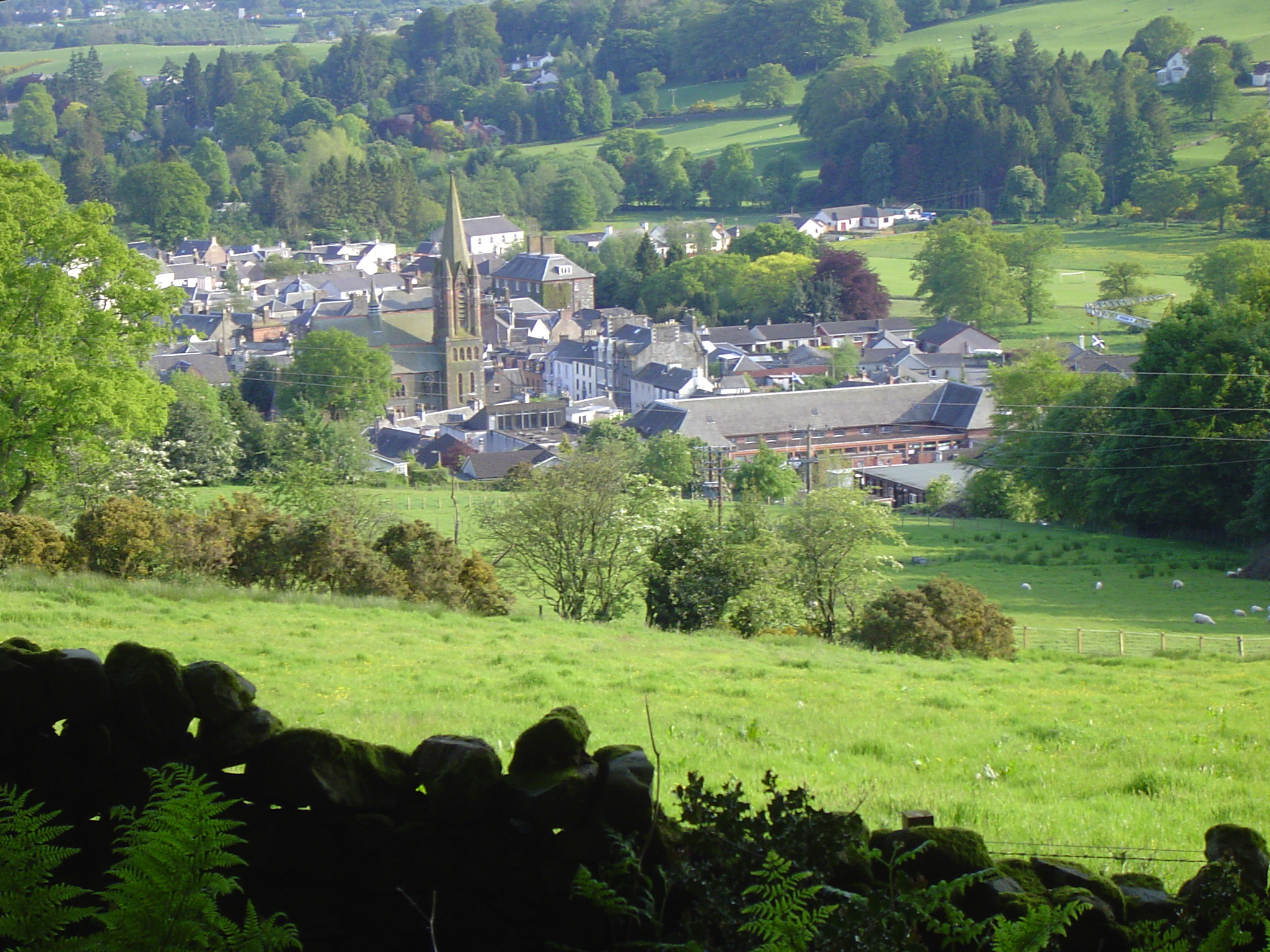
A view of Moffat from the hills.

An article was published in a Moffat newspaper in circa 1885 recalling that a Mrs Richardson of Moffat, born in 1864, recalled running messages as a child for Helen Armstrong, the daughter's married name, and knew her as a daughter of Robert Burns.

== Life and character ==
Little detail is extant regarding Ellen/Helen or Nelly, other than her good looks. The daughter, also Ellen/Helen, after retiring, lived until the age of ninety-eight in the same little back street in Moffat where she had been born. The daughter is said in an 1887 report in the Pall Mall Gazette to have borne a strong physical likeness to Robert Burns's portraits when she was young and even retained a strong resemblance to her death, having similar contours of her face and the poet's dark, bright eyes.

This daughter entered service at around the age of seven and eventually married a Mr Armstrong who died many years before her. Helen Armstrong worked for 30 years at the Buccleuch Arms in Thornhill as a cook. The hotel was then run by the Glendinning family and she only left when the last of that family died.

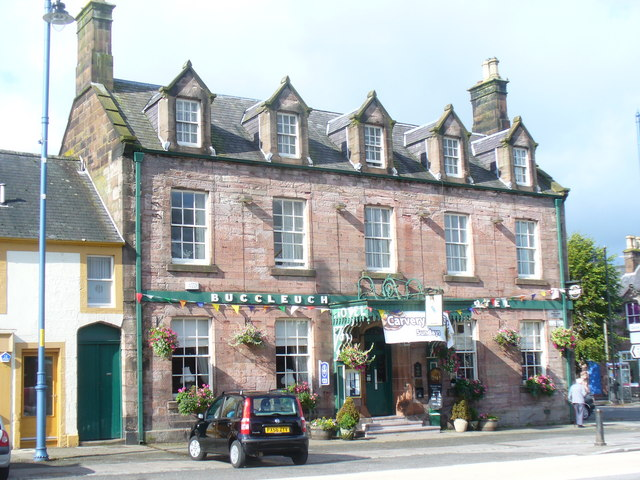
The Buccleuch Hotel in Thornhill.

Helen Armstrong's mental faculties are also said to have additionally indicated her parentage, for "her conversational powers and her quickness of repartee were most amusing anmd attractive". She was popular and in her old age was well cared for by friends, her husband having died many years before and she had no family of her own.

=== The gravestone ===
The gravestone in Moffat old kirk cemetery records "In Memory of Ellen Hyslop who died at Moffat 8th March 1852 aged 87 years." The later inscription for her daughter, carved by a different mason, reads "Also Ellen Armstrong her daughter, who died 13th April 1886, aged 98 years. The stone makes no reference to a father or to the daughter's husband other than his surname and the surname used for the mother is therefore that of her parents. In deeply religious times the placing in such a prominent position of the details of an unmarried mother and her daughter is highly unusual as is the provision of a lair and stone in such cases.

The mother could have been born in 1766 as previously stated. Her daughter would have been born circa 1788/9 and is confirmed to have died in Moffat, having returned here from Thornhill. Robert Burns is known to have visited the area to meet Allan Masterton and William Nicol and wrote Willie Brew'd A Peck O' Maut in 1789 as a memorial to the meeting.

== Micro-history ==
Helen once saw Sir Walter Scott when he came into the kitchen at the Buccleuch Arms and spoke to the head cook. Sir Walter was on a journey to visit the Duke of Buccleuch at nearby Drumlanrig Castle.

Westwood has it that numerous press reports reported her death at the age of 97/98.

== Association with Robert Burns ==
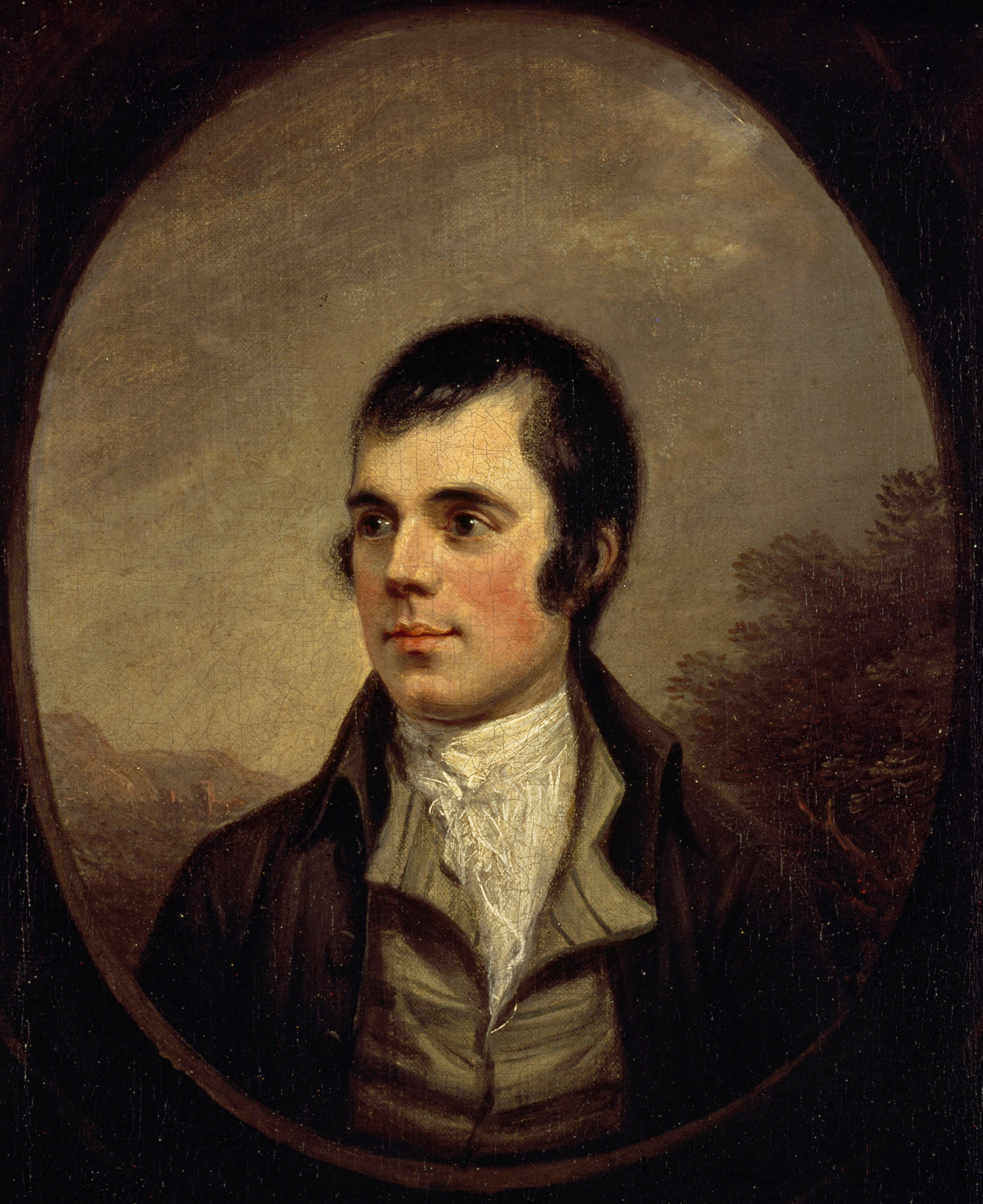
Full view of the Naysmith portrait of 1787, Scottish National Portrait Gallery

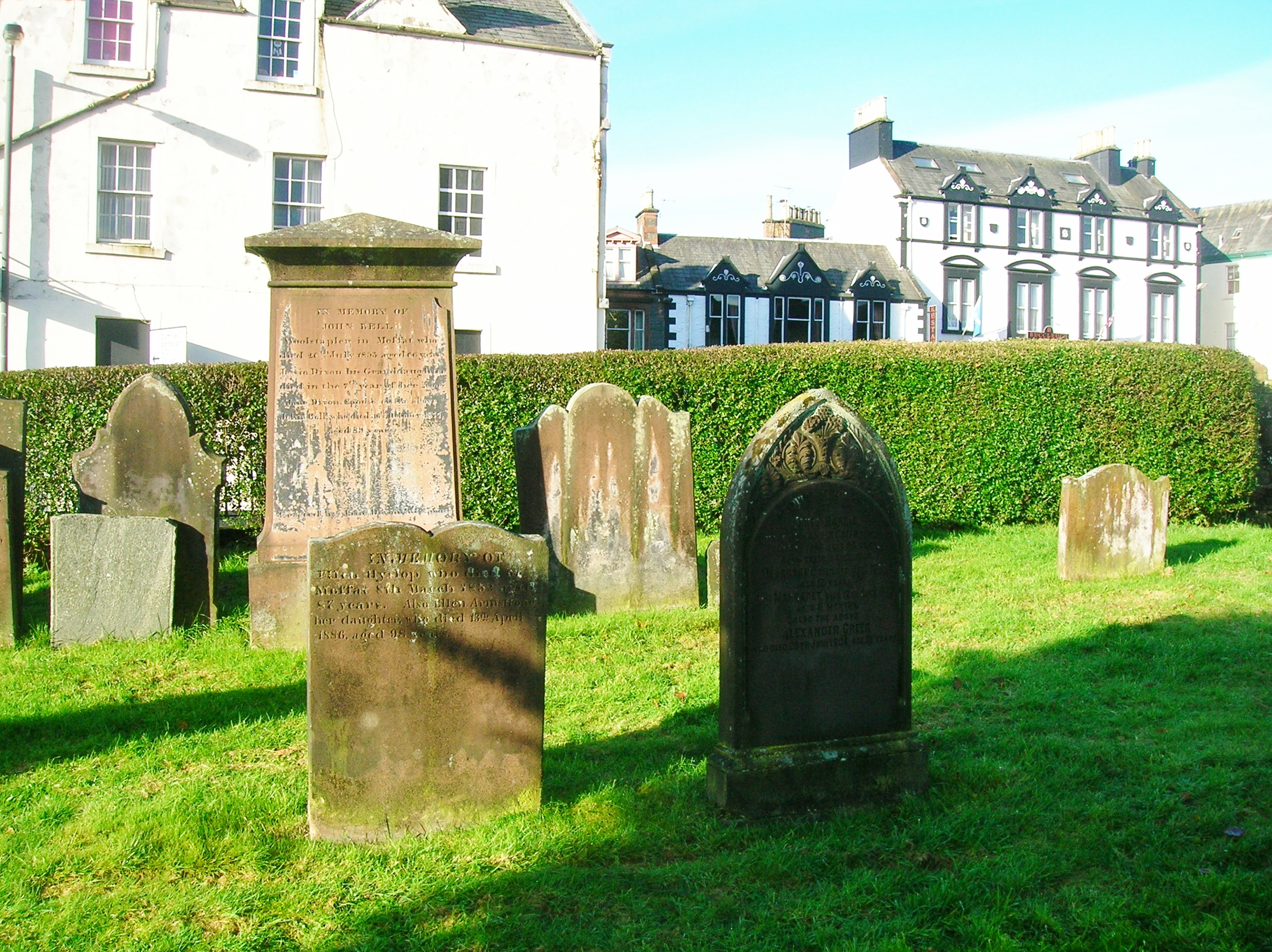
The gravestone of Ellen Hyslop and her daughter Ellen Armstrong at Moffat.

The Helen Hyslop from Langholm is not recorded in the parish register as having had a child. It is clear however from her gravestone's inscription that a daughter, also Ellen or Helen, did exist and given that many illegitimate children were not recorded in parish registers at this time the connection with Burns remains possible but 'not proven'. Burns is known to have frequented the town to take the waters of the Moffat Well and the Hartfell Spa. The fact of his relationship with Robert Burns was well known in the town and the neighbourhood.

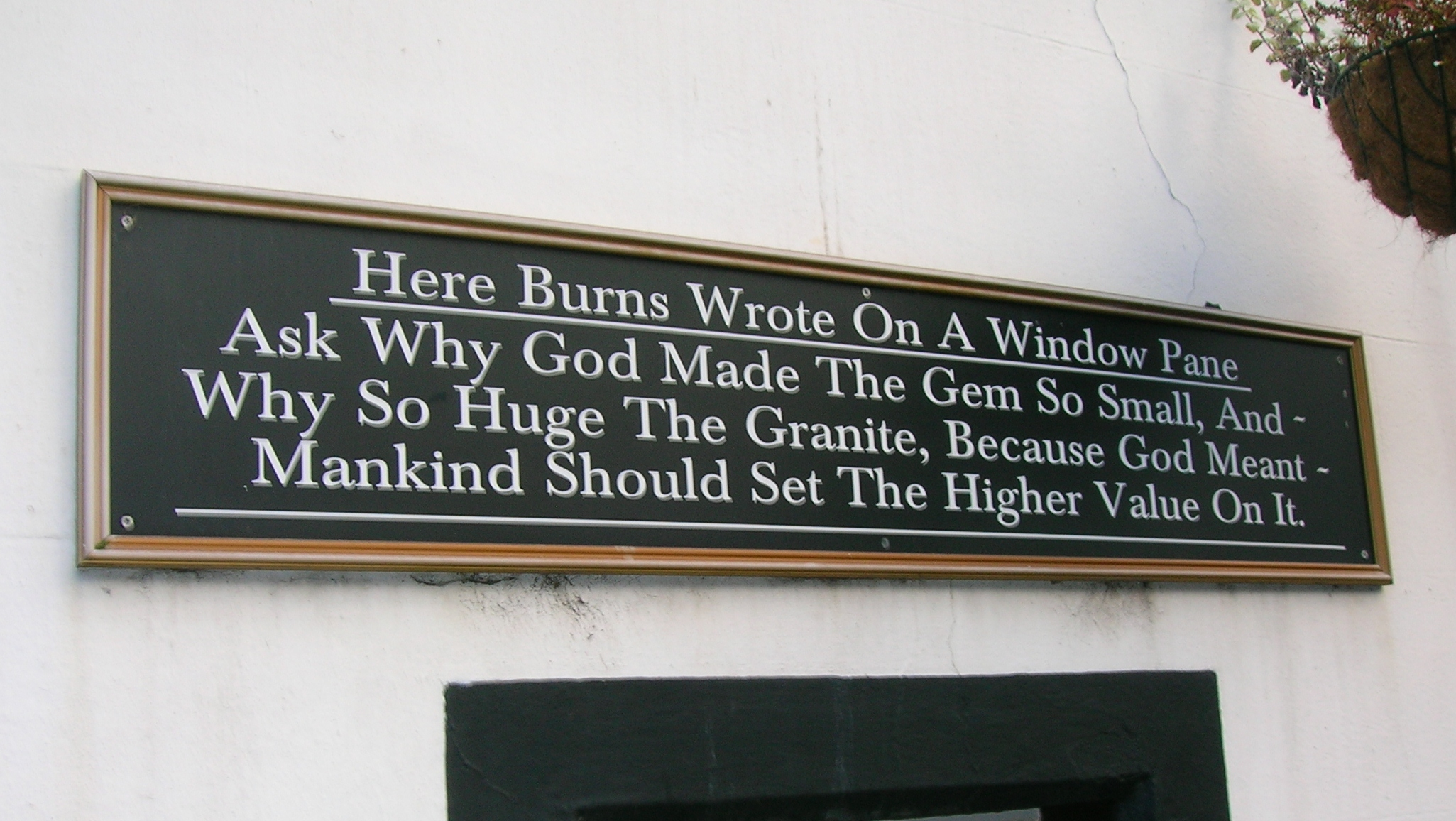
The inscription on the windowpane at the Black Bull Hotel.

He was well known in the local inns, such as the Black Bull in Moffat town centre, where he left his mark in the original inn by making an inscription on one of the windows using his diamond pen. A replica of the window is on display, along with many other Burns memorablia, in what is now called the 'Burns Room' in honour of the poet.

Some confusion exists between Ann Park and the Helen Hyslop story, for Ann's name is recorded with variations such as Ann Hyslop, Helen Anne Hislop, Helen Hyslop, Etc. Ann Park was possibly a second-cousin of William 'Jock' Hyslop,

== See also ==
- Jean Armour
- Lesley Baillie
- Alison Begbie
- Nelly Blair
- Robert Burnes (1719-1789)
- May Cameron
- Mary Campbell (Highland Mary)
- Jenny Clow
- Jean Glover
- Nelly Kilpatrick
- Jessie Lewars
- Elizabeth Paton
- Isabella Steven
- Peggy Thompson

== Sources ==
1. Mackay, James A. (1988). Burns-Lore of Dumfries and Galloway. Ayr : Alloway Publishing. ISBN 0-907526-36-5.
2. Mackay, James (2004). A Biography of Robert Burns. Edinburgh : Mainstream Publishing. ISBN 1-85158-462-5.
3. Pall Mall Gazette, 1887.
4. Robert Burns Chronicle (1968). Mrs Helen Armstrong. Was she a Daughter of Burns? Kilmarnock : Burns Federation.
5. Westwood, Peter J. (2008). Who's Who in the World of Robert Burns. Robert Burns World Federation. ISBN 978-1-899316-98-4.
