= Jean Glover =

Scottish poet and singer

- Born: 31 October 1758; Kilmarnock, Scotland
- Died: 1801 (aged 42–43); Letterkenny, Ireland
- Occupations: Entertainer, actress, poet

Jean Glover or Jennifer Glover (1758–1801) was a Scottish poet and singer. She was the daughter of James Glover, handloom weaver and Jean Thomson, born in Townhead, Kilmarnock; was well educated for the time she lived in, clever and sharp-witted. She had a fine singing voice and exceedingly good looks of "both face and figure".

Robert Burns admired her voice and additionally he copied down her song "O'er the moor amang the heather" and sent it for printing in the Scots Musical Museum in 1792. Dougall records that Burns heard Jean in the Old Commercial Hotel in Croft Street, Kilmarnock. He matched it with a tune which first appeared in Bremner's Reels of 1760, and the song was also published in several later 18th Century collections. It is not clear where he heard her sing this song, however, it may have been at Irvine in 1781 as she was well known there and clearly he knew her well enough to record that she was "not only a whore but also a thief" and it has been suggested that he had one of his many affairs with her.

== Life and character ==
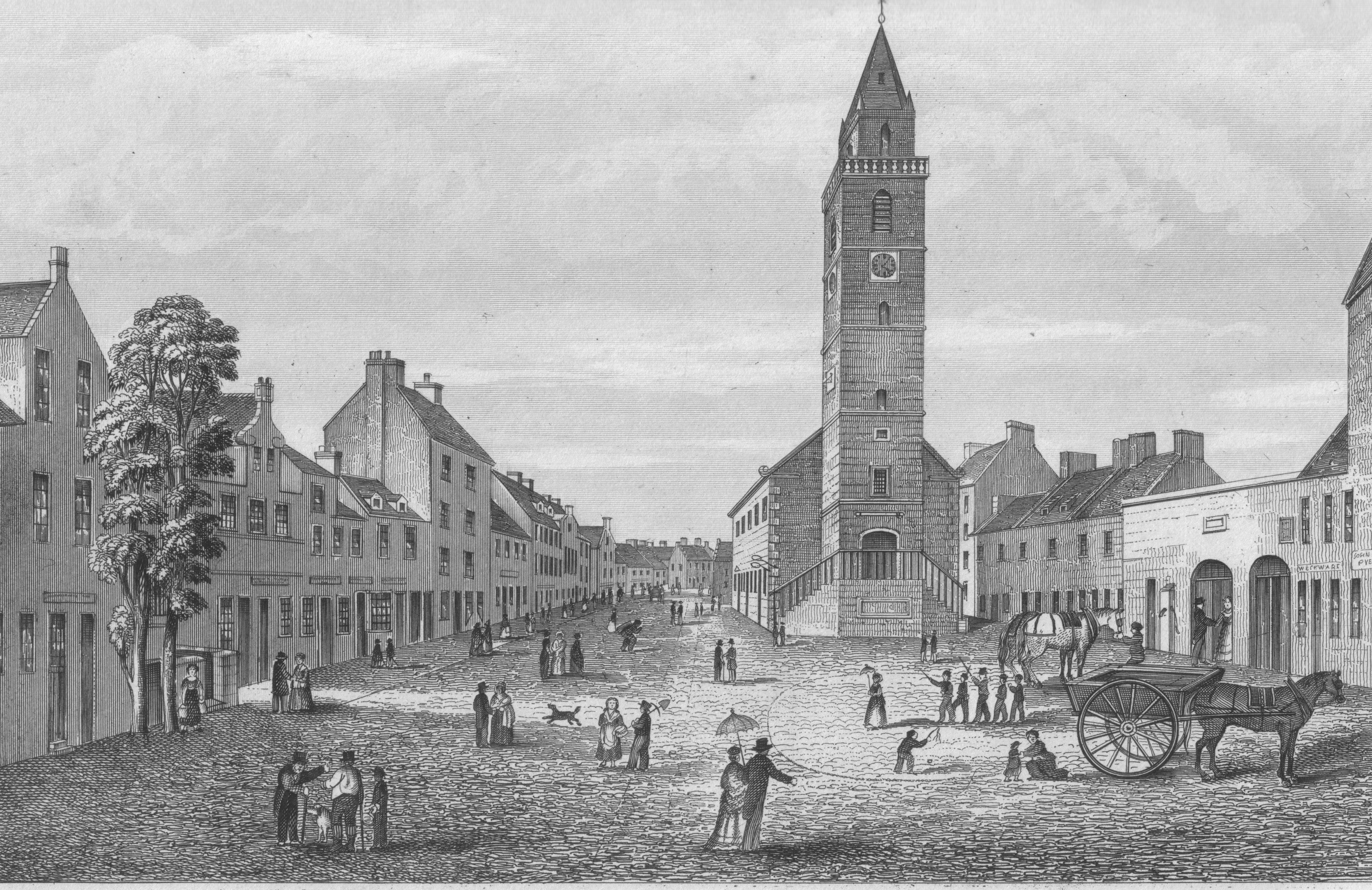
A view of the old Irvine Highstreet.

Jean eloped at an early age with Richard, either a surname or a first name, a 'sleight of hand performer' and leader of the group, one of the heroes of 'sock and buskin' (idleness and dressing in gaudy clothes). Jean had become both stage and star-struck. She is recorded as having performed with her partner at various public houses, theatres being few and far between, such as in 1795 at the Black Bottle Inn at Muirkirk and other small places of entertainment up and down the country, including Irvine as well as Kilmarnock at the 'Croft Lodge' where she was famed for singing 'Green grow the rushes'.

Other contemporaries are recorded as having said that she was merely "a roughly hardened tramp, a wilful, regardless woman."

A contact of the author James Paterson told him that she had seen Jean Glover "gally attired and playing on a tambourine at the mouth of a close, in which was the exhibition room of her husband the conjurer", and thought her "the bravest woman I had ever seen step in leather shoon." A few months prior to her death a final 'sighting' is known of her performing at Letterkenny in County Donegal, Ireland, in apparent good health. However, she died only a few months later.

== Association with Robert Burns ==
Burns took a surprisingly negative view of Jean Glover, explaining how he came to collect "O'er the moor amang the heather", although we cannot be sure that she did in fact compose the song :

"This song is the composition of a Jean Glover, a girl who was not only a whore but also a thief; and in one or other character has visited most of the correction houses in the west. She was born, I believe, in Kilmarnock. I took the song down from her singing as she was strolling the country with a slight of hand blackguard".

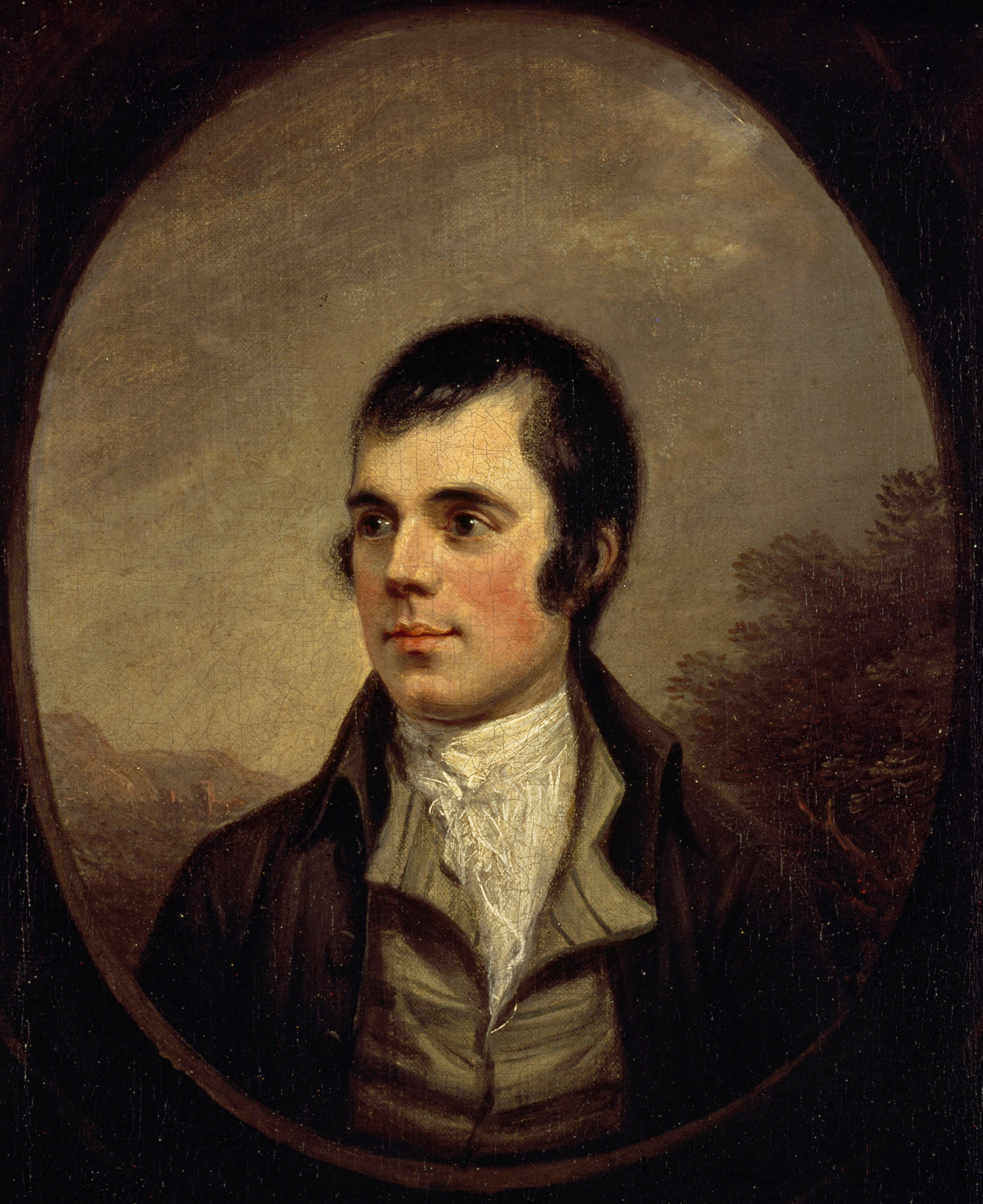
Full view of the Naysmith portrait of 1787, Scottish National Portrait Gallery

It has been suggested that the song is based on the Scots ballad "The Laird o' Drum", but little evidence can be found for this in any published collections. It was certainly a popular song in Ulster in the past.

== Micro-history ==
Jean's brother James worked at the Muirkirk iron-works.

== See also ==
- Jean Armour
- Lesley Baillie
- Alison Begbie
- Nelly Blair
- May Cameron
- Mary Campbell (Highland Mary)
- Jenny Clow
- Jean Gardner
- Helen Hyslop
- Nelly Kilpatrick
- Jessie Lewars
- Elizabeth Paton
- Isabella Steven
- Peggy Thompson
- List of 18th-century British working-class writers
