= Jean Gardner =

Close friend of Robert Burns and a Buchanite

- Born: September 1746; Irvine, Ayrshire, Scotland
- Died: Circa 1793; Philadelphia, USA
- Occupation: Housewife

Jean Gardner or later Jean Hill, was "a young woman of very surpassing beauty," with a "light foot and an ensnaring eye," but she may have been thirteen years older than Robert Burns, with whom she was on friendly or 'intimate' terms. A strong local tradition in Irvine links her with Burns, however, no contemporary written evidence records this relationship and Burns himself was not thought to have written about her, other than a disputed use of her given name as the 'darling Jean' of Burns's 'Epistle to Davie', and most recent writers have considered the reference to be to Jean Armour.

== Life and character ==
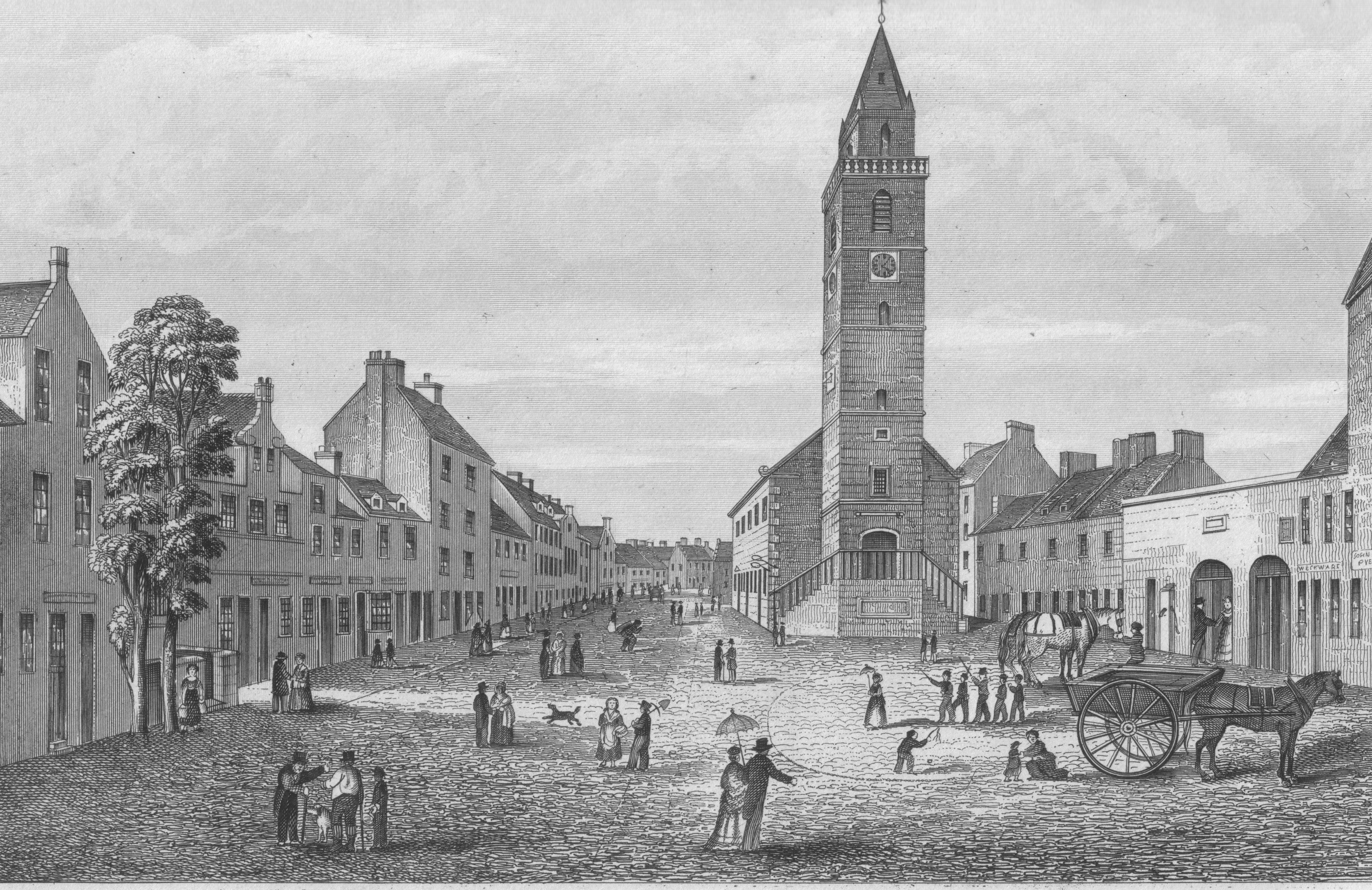
Old Irvine.

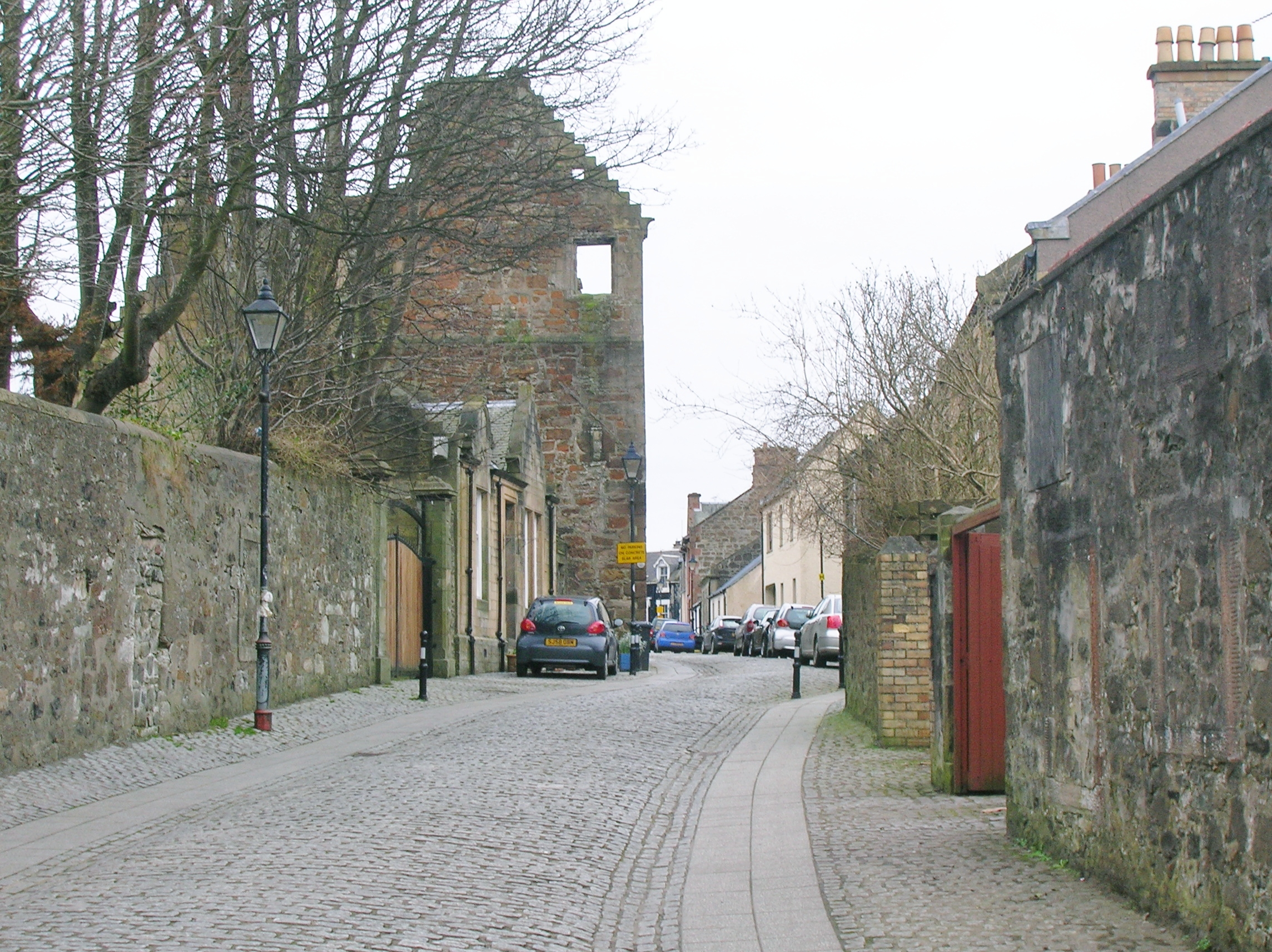
Seagate Street and castle in Irvine.

Gardner may have been the daughter of James Gardiner (d.1768), a butcher living at the Seagate in Irvine, and Janet Caldwell. James owned three houses in the Seagate and a park called Spenshill. Gardner was baptised on 14 September 1746. When James Gardiner died in 1768, his eldest daughter inherited half of his property; already a widow according to Strawhorn, her dead husband, a shipmaster, being one Alexander Armour. This would confusingly make her married name 'Jean Armour.'

It was in Gardner’s family house in Seagate (probably in the second house on the right from Highstreet) that the preacher Hugh White was supposed to have lodged. Revd. Hugh White or Whyte was the minister of the Relief Congregation which had seceded from the established church and it was after he preached a sermon at Glasgow that one Elspeth Buchan or Elspat Buchan (1738–1791) followed him back to Irvine where she went on to form the fanatical Buchanites. The Revd White and his wife supported her and he was suspended from his church as a result.

Gardner joined the Buchanites, who numbering only around forty-six at this time, were expelled from Irvine in May 1784 after the sect had seceded from the Relief Church. She eventually joined them in the barn at New Cample in Dumfrieshire where the Buchanites had temporarily settled after 'Mother Buchan' sent Andrew Inness back to collect her. It has been speculated that she was unwilling to leave because of her attachment to Burns.

At New Cample, she met and later married George Hill, another member of the group, after the sect broke up. The couple emigrated to America where she was said to have died from a fever at Philadelphia in around 1793. It is also recorded that her sister Kate and the rest of her family joined the Buchanites and that Kate or Katie had a child with Andrew Inness, whom she was not allowed to marry as this was against the laws of the sect. Kate remained with Andrew in a belated celibate friendship until she died and he became the last member of the sect.

=== George Hill ===
George Hill was the first person who joined the Buchanites at New Cample. He was well educated and had been for some time a clerk to the Closeburn Lime Works. He lived at Closeburn Castle with Mr Stewart on the estate of Mr Monteith, and often visited the sect. A native of Edinburgh, his relations there became aware of his being about to give up his job for the purpose of becoming a Buchanite. Two of his brothers travelled to Closeburn to persuade him against taking such a move that would ruin him and bring disgrace to the family.

== Association with Robert Burns ==
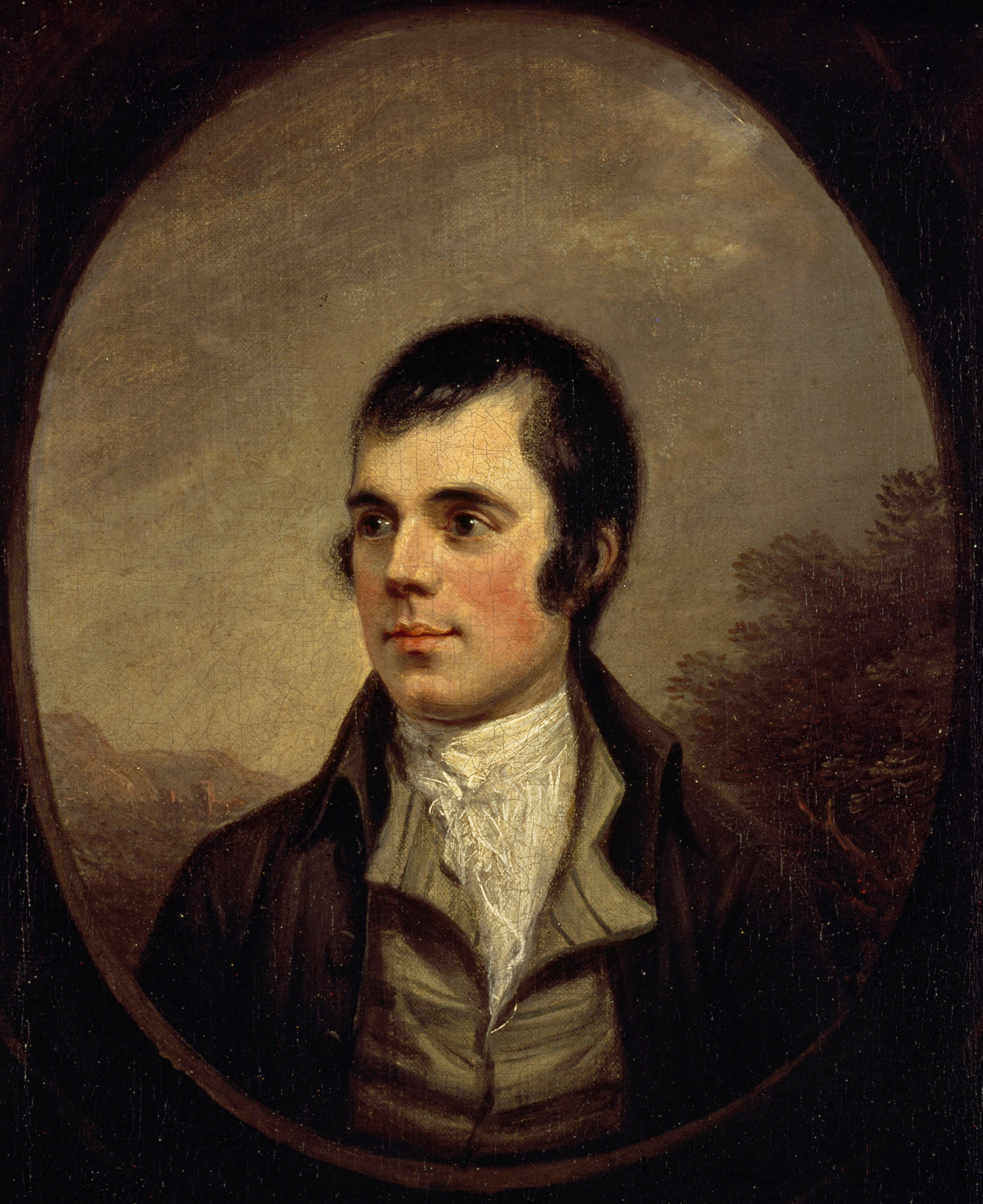
Full view of the Naysmith portrait of 1787, Scottish National Portrait Gallery

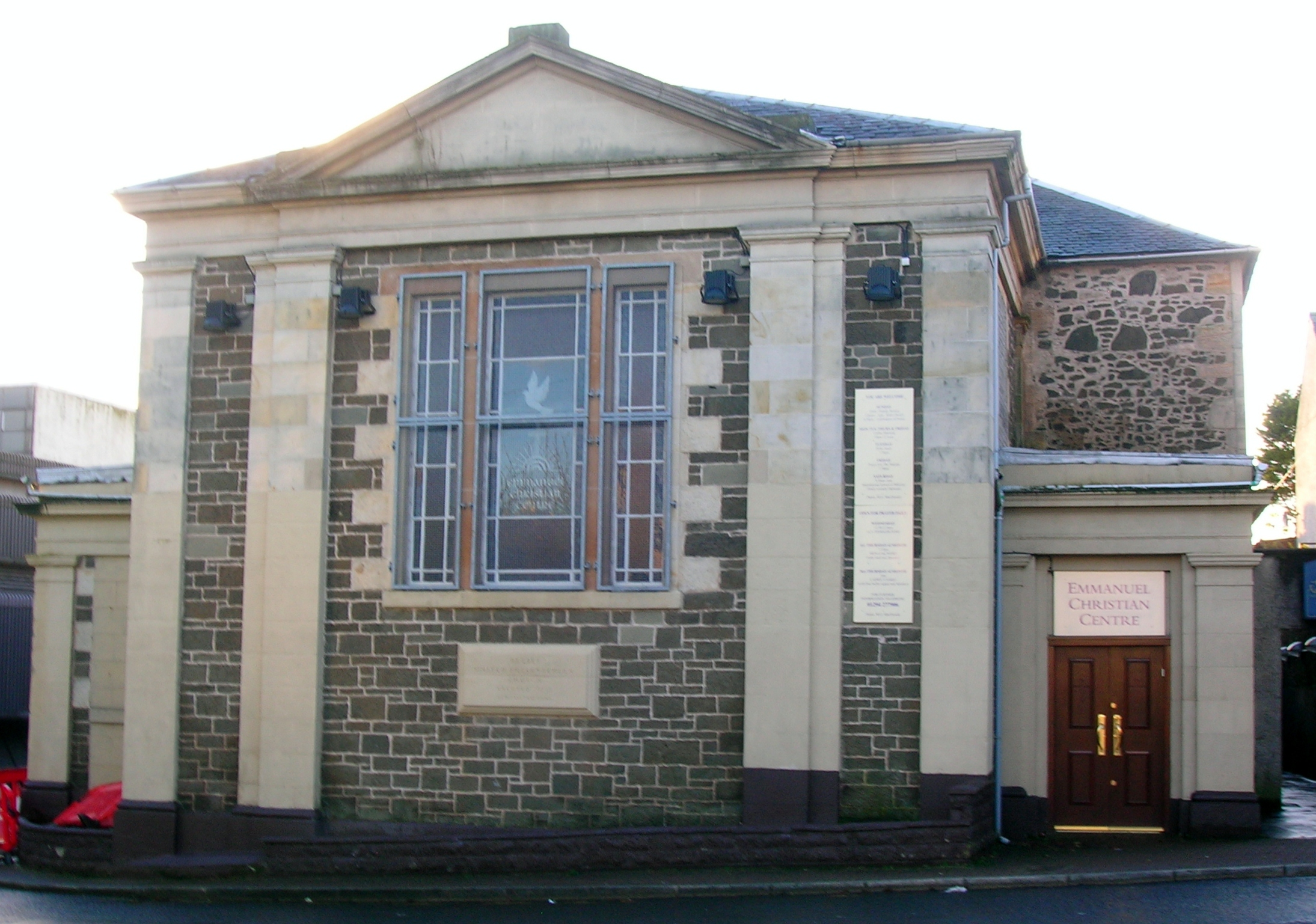
The Relief church where Hugh White was once the minister

A fanatical member of the Buchanites sect, Andrew Innes was recorded to have said that "When I was sent back from Thornhill for Mr Hunter, Jean Gardner came with me from Irvine to Closeburn, and when we were in the neighbourhood of Tarbolton, she seemed to be in fear, and in a rather discomposed condition; when in enquired the cause, she said it was lest Burns the poet, should see her, for if he did, he would be sure to interrupt her, for they had been on terms of intimacy, but we proceeded on our journey without meeting any obstruction." Burns had actually moved to Mossgiel by this date.

Although the word 'intimate' was supposedly used this could mean little more than 'good friends' in the 18th century. However, Burns' sister, Mrs Begg stated that the poet was for a time fond of Jean Gardner. Joseph Train states that "Burns frequently visited her in the society both at New Cample and Auchen Gibbert." It has been suggested that Jean tried to persuade the poet to join the Buchanites.

Robert was also said to have ridden after her to New Cample where he tried to persuade to return, spending a whole day and night trying to persuade her to leave the sect. However, this may simply be an exaggeration based on Andrew Innes's actual testimony given half a century after the events took place.

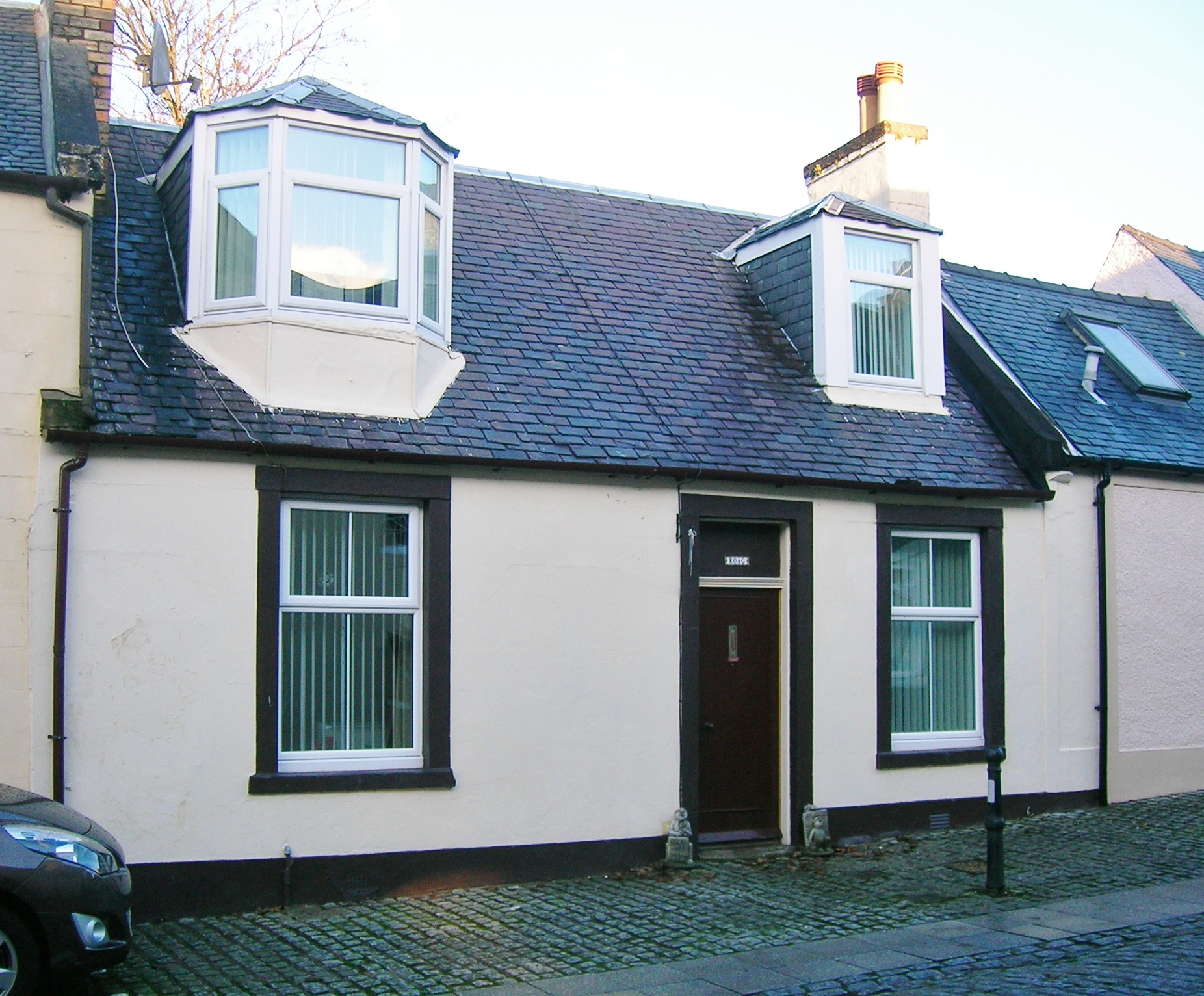
What may be Jean Gardner's house in Seagate.

Burns was recorded as having held a surprisingly dim view of the Buchanites and wrote:- "[A]bout two years ago, a Mrs Buchan from Glasgow came among them, & began to spread some fanatical notions of religion among them, [...] till in spring last the Populace rose & mobbed the old leader Buchan & put her out of the town; on which all her followers voluntarily quit the place likewise, & with such precipitation, that many of them never shut their doors behind them [...] Their tenets are a strange jumble of enthusiastic jargon; among others, she pretends to give them the Holy Ghost by breathing on them, which she does with postures & practices that are scandalously indecent. They have likewise disposed of all life, carrying on a great farce of pretended devotion in barns, & woods, where they lodge and lye all together, & hold likewise a community of women, as it is another of their tenets that they can commit no moral sin. [...] This My Dear Sir, is one of the many instances of the folly in leaving the guidance of sound reason, & common sense in matters of Religion."

== See also ==
- Jean Armour
- Lesley Baillie
- Alison Begbie
- Nelly Blair
- May Cameron
- Mary Campbell (Highland Mary)
- Jenny Clow
- Jean Glover
- Helen Hyslop
- Kate Kemp
- Nelly Kilpatrick
- Jessie Lewars
- Elizabeth Paton
- David Sillar
- Isabella Steven
- Peggy Thompson
