= Nelly Blair =

- Born: Ayrshire, Scotland
- Died: Scotland
- Occupation: Wife to john smith

Nelly Blair, later Nelly Smith (1759–1820) is sometimes suggested as being Scottish poet Robert Burns' first love.

== The true identity of Nell ==
Burns himself did not identify his 'Handsome Nell' by name. Nelly Kilpatrick has been suggested as being Burns's first romantic love, but some significant doubts exist about the true identity of this individual. It was thought to be a Nelly Blair until Burns's sister Isabella gave the name Nelly Kilpatrick, however Isobel was only three years old at the time of Burns's association with Nelly and some doubt must be cast on her recollections at this stage in her life.

== Life and character ==
Burns stated that Nelly had a sweet voice and was wont to sing songs as she worked in the fields.

The first reference to Nelly's identity by the Reverend Hamilton Paul of Ayr in 1819 records that: "This nymph was afterwards married to a Carrick farmer, and became the mother of many sons and daughters, and who, when we saw her in 1811, still retained the characteristics of sonsieness, which so fascinated her helpmate in the work of the harvest as to betray him into the sin of rhyme. She sung delightfully, and he wrote a copy of verses to her favourite air or reel."

A parish record at Dreghorn records that a Helen Blair married a Carrick farmer, John Smith on 13 December 1788 and a daughter Helen was born at Dailly on 18 February 1789. Several other children were born in subsequent years.

In 1828 an anonymous letter to The Scotsman related that a friend of the writer had been a significant landowner in Ayrshire and that Robert Burns had been a frequent visitor to his kitchen and had written many songs about Nelly Blair, a servant in the house.

== Association with Robert Burns ==
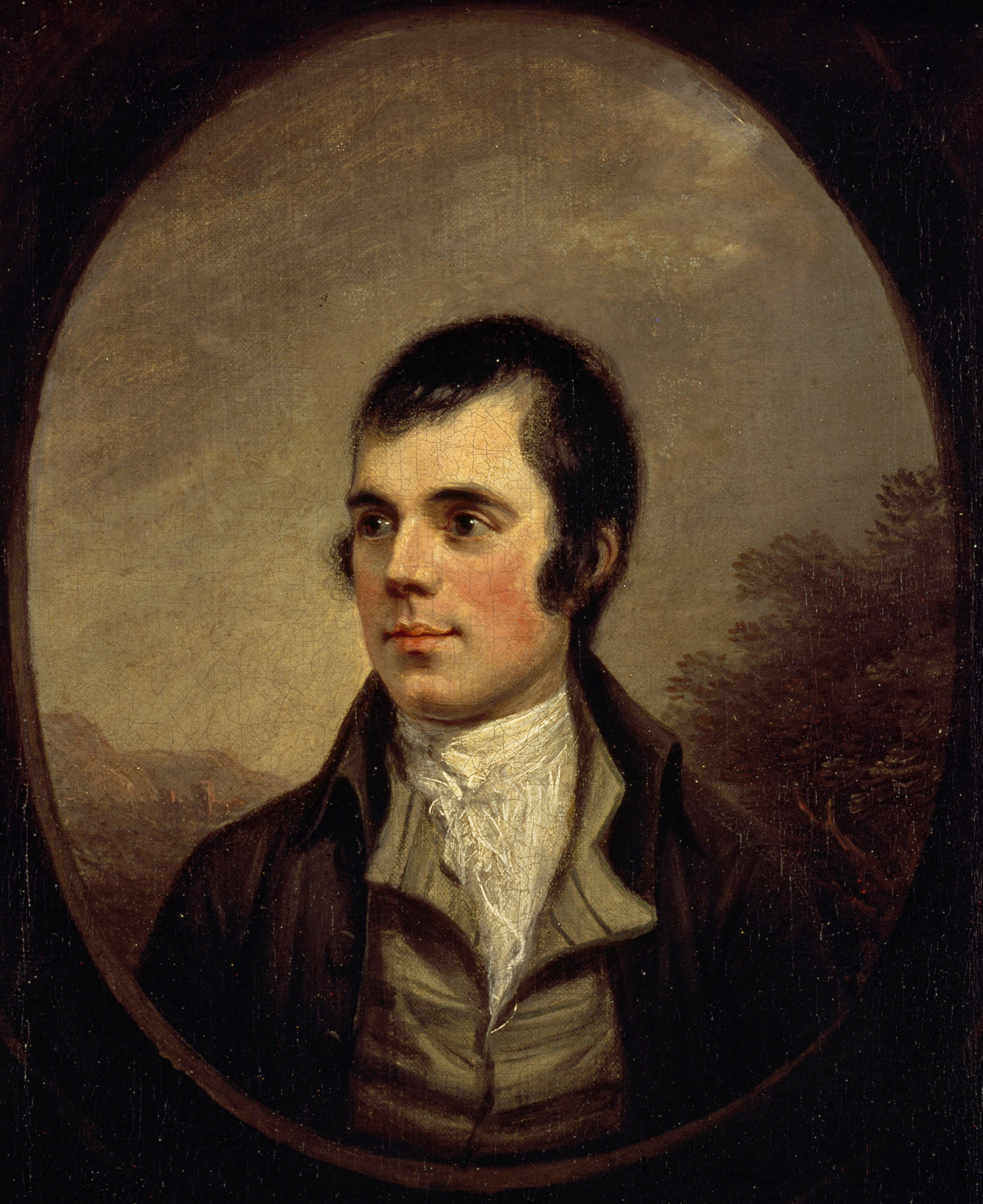
Full view of the Naysmith portrait of 1787, Scottish National Portrait Gallery

When Robert Burns was 15 he met "Handsome Nell", his first young love, a "bonnie, sweet, sonsie lass", although he apparently never told her of his love. Nelly Bone, is better known as Nelly Kilpatrick. They are first recorded to have met when William Burns hired some extra help to bring in the harvest while they were at nearby Mount Oliphant Farm and Burns came to be paired with her, following the Ayrshire custom of that time.

In his autobiographical letter to Dr Hunter he wrote: "Indeed, I did not not well know myself I liked so much to loiter behind with her when returning in the evening from our labours; why the tones of her voice made my heart-strings thrill like an Aeolian harp, and particularly why my pulse beat such a furious rantann when I looked and fingered over her hand to pick out the nettle-stings and thistles".

He wrote a poem to Nell, unpublished during his life, but it appeared in his Commonplace Book and set to the tune of Nelly's favourite reel.

He had heard her singing a song by a local country laird's son who was courting her and felt that he could do better, so it was with Nelly in mind that he wrote his first song "Handsome Nell" –

"O once I lov'd a bonnie lass,
Aye, and I love her still;
And whilst that virtue warms my breast,
I'll love my handsome Nell."

The tune to the song has not come down to us. Some years later Burns wrote of this song, saying –

"I never had the least thought or inclination of turning poet till I got once heartily in love, and then rhyme and song were, in a manner, the spontaneous language of my heart. I remember I composed it in a wild enthusiasm of passion, and to this hour I never recollect it but my heart melts, and my blood sallies at the remembrance."

Nelly has been said to figure in Burns's poem, "Halloween"

"The lasses staw frae 'mang them a'
To pou their stalks of corn:
But Rab slips out, and jinks about,
Behint the muckle thorn:
He grippet Nelly hard and fast;
Loud skirl'd a' the lasses;
But her tap-pickle maist was lost,
When kitlin' in the fause-house
Wi' him that night."

and the verse :

"Nell had the fause-house in her min',
She pits hersel and Rob in;
In loving bleeze they sweetly join,
Till white in ase they're sobbin';
Nell's heart was dancin' at the view,
She whisper'd Rob to leuk for't:
Rob, stowlins, prie'd her bonny mou',
Fu' cozie in the neuk for't,
Unseen that night."

== See also ==
- Jean Armour
- Alison Begbie
- May Cameron
- Mary Campbell (Highland Mary)
- Jenny Clow
- Jean Gardner
- Jean Glover
- Nelly Kilpatrick
- Jessie Lewars
- Mary Morison
- Ann Park
- Elizabeth Paton
- Peggy Thompson
