= May Cameron =

- Born: 1766; Fortingall, Scotland
- Died: Unknown; Scotland
- Occupation: Servant

May Cameron also known as Margaret, Peggy, or Meg Cameron, was a servant in Edinburgh, working at a house close to that of William Creech, Burns's Edinburgh publisher.

== Life and character ==
May Cameron was, as stated, a servant girl working in Edinburgh. After a brief relationship with Robert Burns she lost her job and had at first to rely upon the poet for funds. May married her cousin Mungo Forbes in September 1788. Mackay states that she was a Highlander.

=== Association with Robert Burns ===
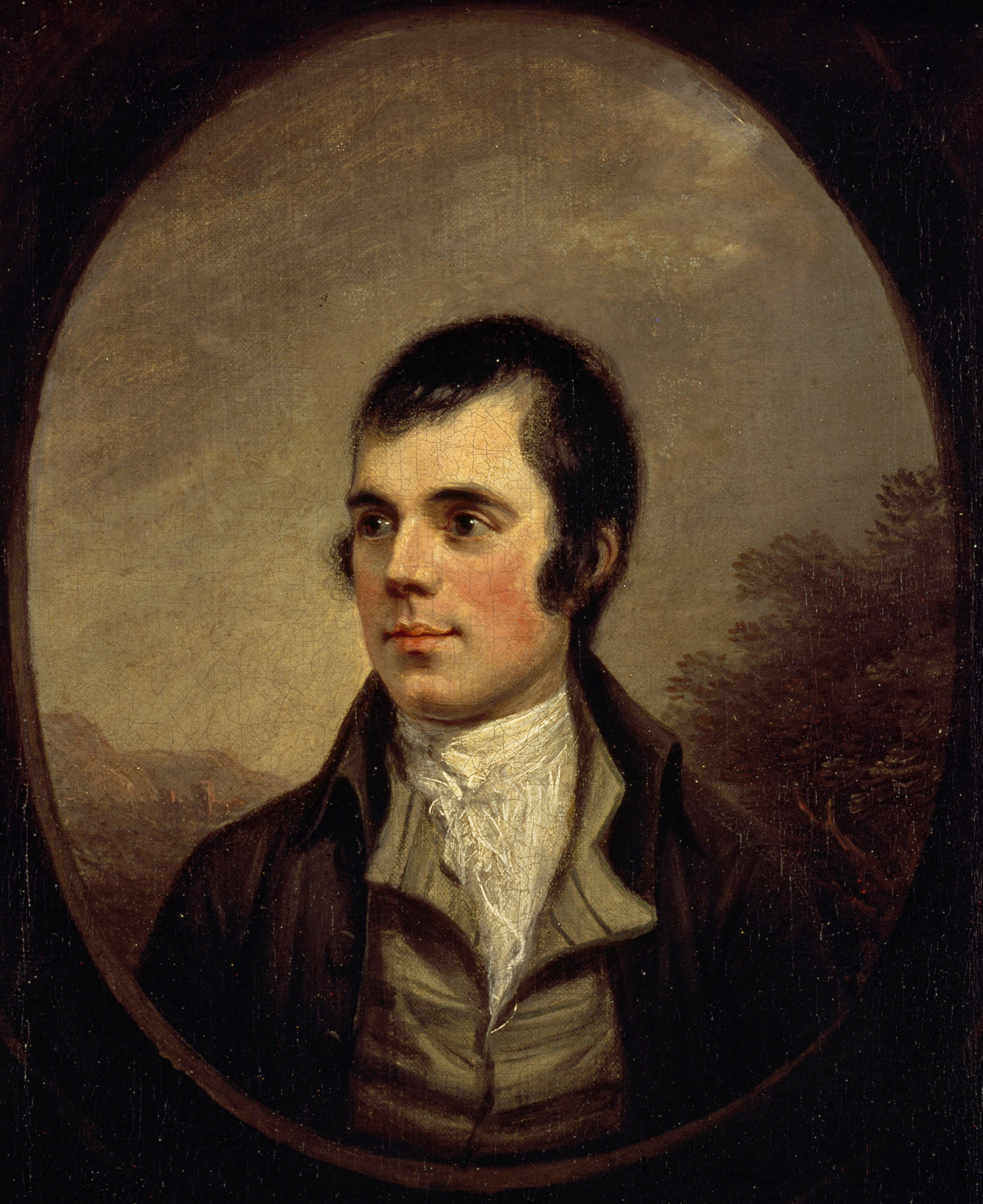
Full view of the Naysmith portrait of 1787, Scottish National Portrait Gallery

A letter to Robert Ainslie of 25 June 1787 states that "... the Devil's Day-book only April 14 or fifteen so cannot yet have increased her growth much. ..." suggesting that Burns had intercourse with her for the first time about 14 or 15 April.

In early June 1787, when he was in Dumfries receiving the freedom of the burgh, Burns received May's letter, probably written for her by a friend, Mrs Hog, an innkeeper, and dated 26 May, reached him: "I beg, for God's sake, you will write and let me know how I am to do. You can write to any person you can trust to get me a place to stay till such time as you come to town yourself".

Burns immediately wrote an undated note to Robert Ainslie, asking him to: "send for the wench and give her ten or twelve shillings... and advise her out to some country (friends)... Call immediately, or at least as soon as it is dark, for God's sake lest the poor soul be starving. — Ask her for a letter I wrote her just now, by way of token " The letter was unsigned. Burns added the telling instruction, "but don't for Heaven's sake meddle with her as a Piece".

May had served on Burns a lawyer's writ In meditatione fugae as used against a debtor contemplating leaving the country. This action in law was however quickly settled by 15 August 1787, freeing him from the implications of arrest, possibly because May miscarried or gave birth to a stillborn child. Burns kept this document, which carries two verses of an 'old and broadly humorous song', according to his biographer, Chambers. Chambers wrote that 'the terms of this writ must have been merely used formally, in order to force him to grant the required security.'

Lindsey maintains that Burns met her once again in Edinburgh and promised that all would be well. He also had his doubts as to whether he was the father.

Whilst Burns was on his tour of northern England he took ..extremely ill with strong feverish symptoms, & take a servant of Mr Hood's to watch me all night ... This illness took place five to six weeks after his intercourse with May Cameron and it has been suggested that Burns had acquired a venereal disease from her. He seems to have recovered without any further discomfort or symptoms and the suggestion therefore remains unproven.

== See also ==
- Jean Armour
- Alison Begbie or Elizabeth Gebbie
- Nelly Blair
- Jenny Clow
- Jean Gardner
- Jean Glover
- Helen Hyslop
- Kate Kemp
- Nelly Kilpatrick
- Jessie Lewars
- Agnes Maclehose
- Peggy Thompson
