= Elizabeth Paton =

Friend of Robert Burns

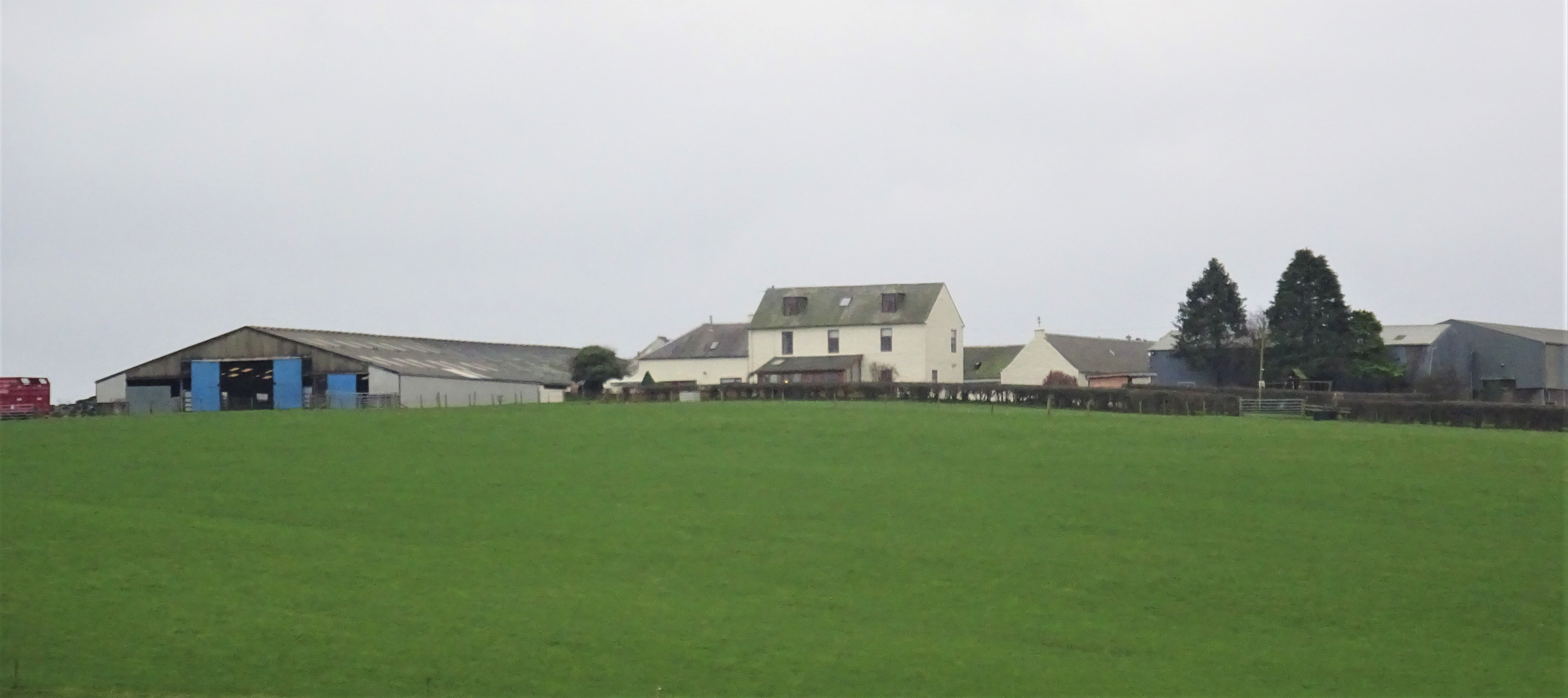
- Aird Farm
- Born: 1760; Tarbolton, Scotland
- Died: 1799 (aged 38–39); Scotland
- Occupations: Servant and then housewife
- Children: Elizabeth Burns

Elizabeth Paton or later Elizabeth Andrew of Lairgieside (1760 – c. 1799) was the daughter of James Paton and Eleanor Helen Paton of Aird Farm, Crossroads, Ayrshire. Following an affair with Robert Burns she gave birth on 22 May 1785 to his first child, Elizabeth "Bess" Burns, the "Dear-bought Bess", who was baptised when only two days old. Betsey met Robert Burns when she was employed as a servant girl at the Burns's Lochlea Farm during the winter of 1783–84. When the Burns family moved to Mossgiel Farm in March 1784, Betsey returned to her own home, where Robert Burns visited her later that year. In 1786, Elizabeth made a claim on Burns, but accepted a settlement of twenty pounds which the poet paid out of the profits of the Kilmarnock Edition. Loving Burns with heartfelt devotion, she continued to see him after the Burns family had moved to Mossgiel Farm, and he returned these sentiments with more physical than spiritual devotions. Isabella Begg, Burns's youngest sister, stated that although Robert did not love her, "he never treated her unkindly."

== Life and character ==
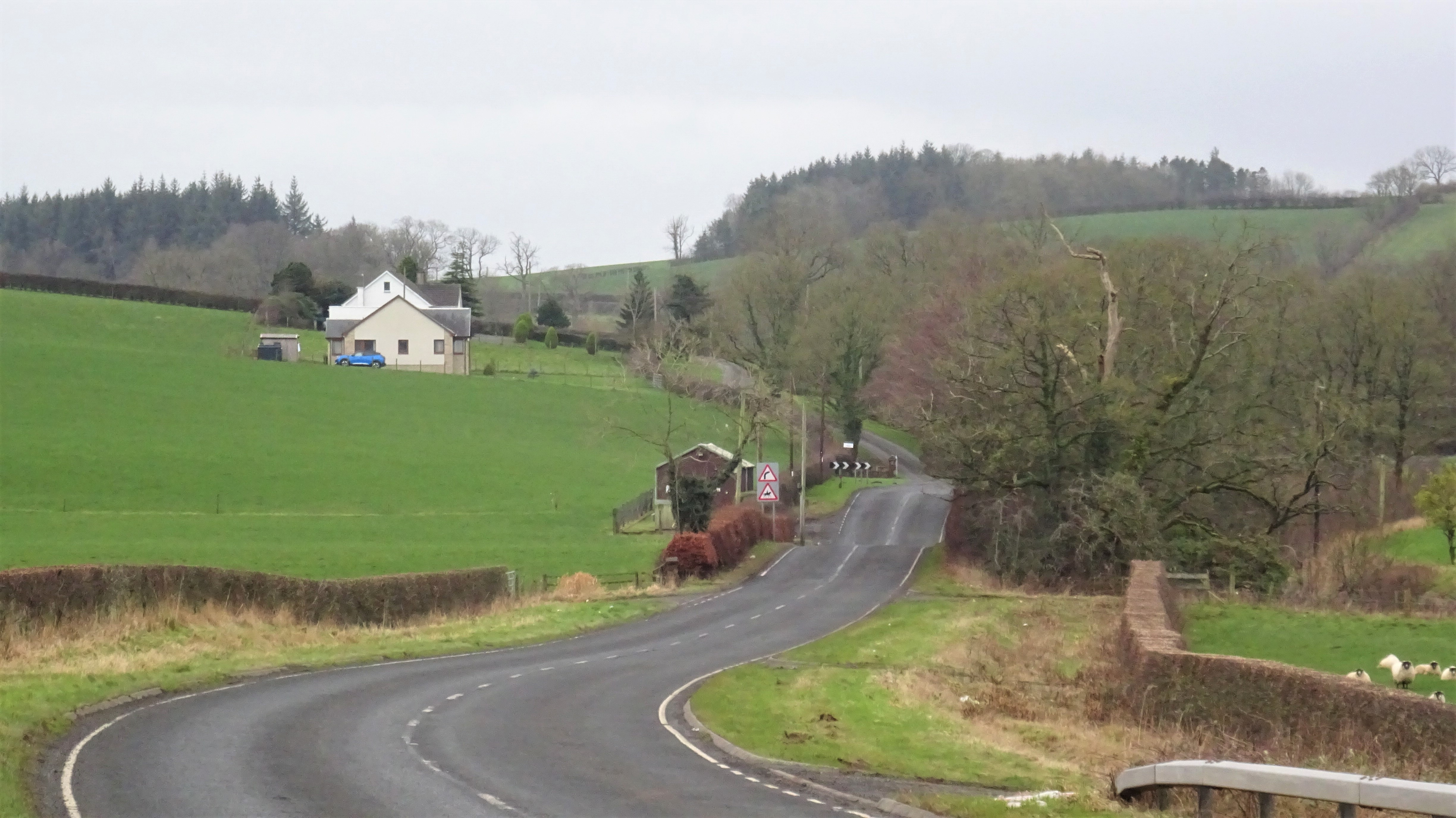
Aird Bridgend with the Dallars Estate and Shaw Mill nearby

She is said to have had a plain face but a good figure. She eventually married John Andrew, a ploughman and widower, on 9 February 1788 in Tarbolton, Ayrshire, Scotland. They had four children; she is said to have been a model housewife. She is presumed to have died before 1799, when John remarried one Jean Lees.

Isabella Begg had heard of Elizabeth Paton as "rude and uncultivated to a great degree... with a thorough (though unwomanly) contempt for every sort of refinement."' In a letter to Robert Chambers she describes Elizabeth as "A well developed, plain-featured peasant girl, frank and independent .." and for these reasons a favourite with Burns's mother. She goes on to say that Elizabeth Paton had a "masculine understanding" and contempt for anything that savoured of culture.

== Association with Robert Burns ==
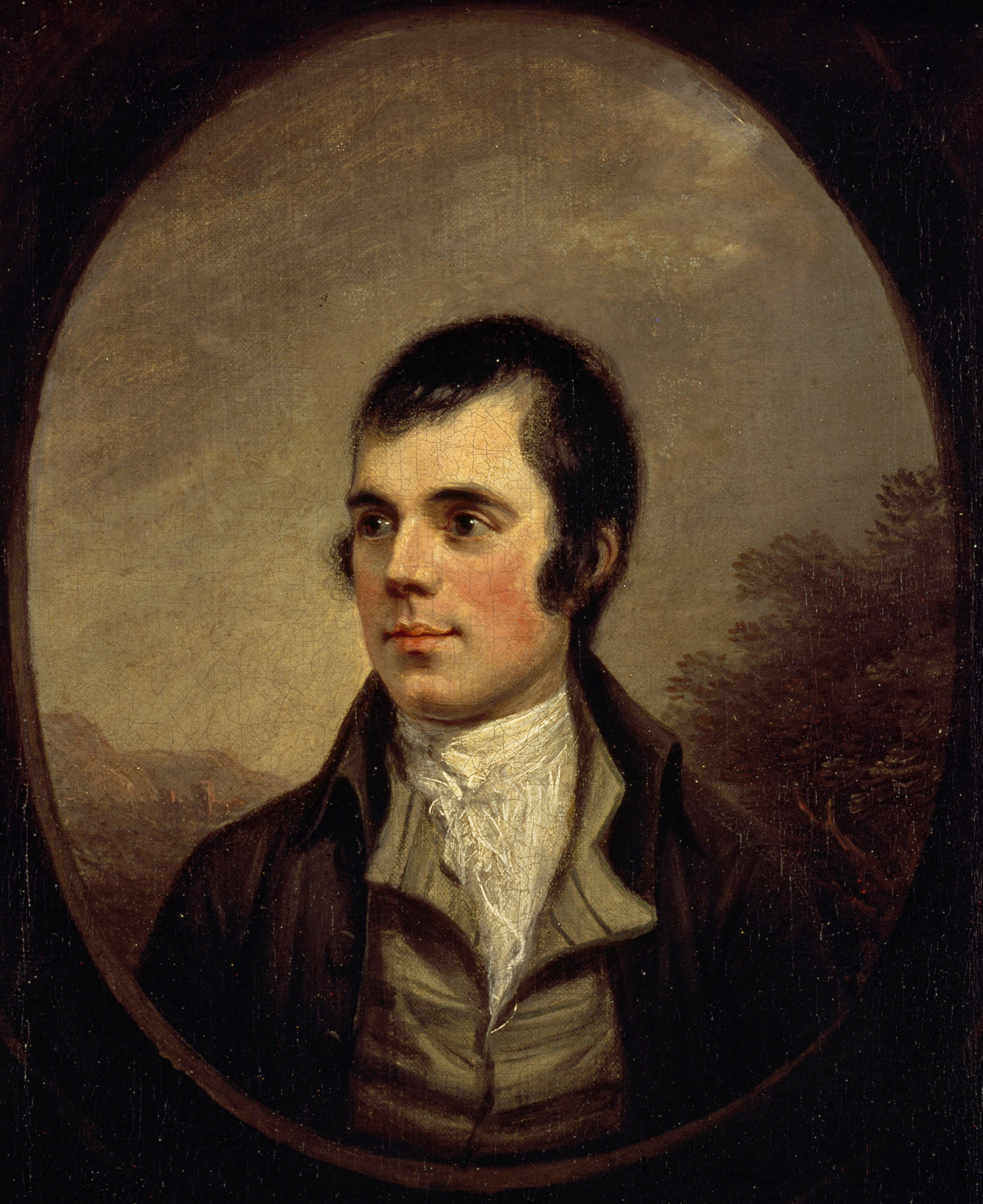
Full view of the Naysmith portrait of 1787, Scottish National Portrait Gallery

Elizabeth gave birth to Robert Burns's first illegitimate child. Burns's mother, who was fond of Elizabeth, wanted her son to marry her, but his brother Gilbert and his sisters were against such a marriage. As the penalty for impregnating Elizabeth, Burns had to pay a fine of a guinea and he also had to do penance in church before the congregation. He responded by writing three poems: some insignificant lines, when 'rough, rude ready-witted Rankine' twitted him over Miss Paton's condition, followed by the brilliant, but somewhat tasteless, outburst of sexual boastfulness of the 'Epistle to John Rankine' of Adamhill. In this poem, Burns describes his seduction in terms of the field. The 'poacher-court' got to hear of the 'paitrick hen' he had brought down with his 'gun', so he had to 'thole the blethers' and pay the fee. However, he is quite unrepentant; for, as soon as her 'clockin'-time is by' and the child is born, he promises himself further 'sportin' by and by' to get value for his guinea.

When baby "bonnie Betty" was born, Burns expressed fatherly tenderness, forgetting his earlier masculine posturing. In a Poet's welcome to his 'Love-begotten Daughter' or alternatively 'his bastard wean' we find:

"Welcome! lily bonie, sweet, wee dochter,
Tho' ye come here a wee unsought for,
And tho' your comin' I hae fought for,
Baith kirk and queir;
Yet, by my faith, ye're no unwrought for
That I shall swear!...
Lord grant that thou may ay inherit
Thy mither's person, grace, an' merit,
An' thy poor, worthless daddie's spirit,
Without his failins,
Twill please me mair to see thee
Than stocket mailens...

No poems seem to have been inspired directly by Elizabeth Paton, but she may have been in the poet's mind when he wrote "The Rantin' Dog." A few lines in Burns's first Commonplace Book dated September 1784 relate to her.

In 1784, in the song "O Tibbie, I hae seen the day", which were addressed to Isabella Steven, the daughter of a Tarbolton farmer, Burns addresses her with:

"There lives a lass beside yon park,
I'd rather hae her in her sark.
Than you, wi' a' your thousan mark;
That gars you look sae high."

In this piece the poet may have been referring to Elizabeth as the "lass beside yon park" although he never confirms this.

== Elizabeth Bishop ==
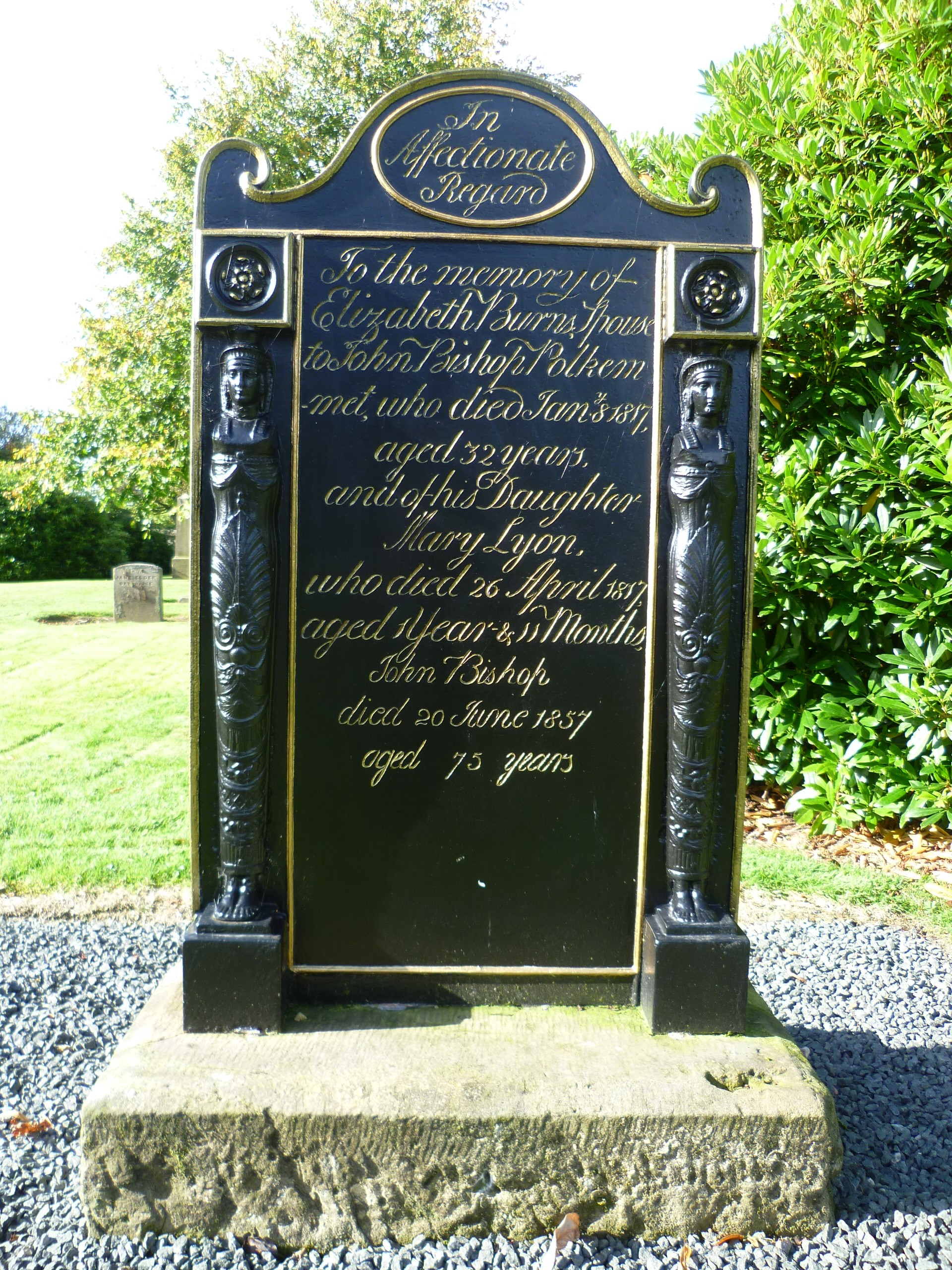
The headstone of Elizabeth Bishop.

Elizabeth Bishop (22 May 1785 – 8 January 1817) was Robert Burns's first child following an affair with Paton. Elizabeth married John Bishop, factor to the Baillie of Polkemmet, also recorded as an innkeeper, and had seven children. Elizabeth died aged 31, possibly during childbirth.

Elizabeth Bishop lived as a child at Mossgiel Farm, under Burns's mother's care, until Robert Burns's death. She then returned to her own mother, who was by this time married to John Andrew, a ploughman. At the age of twenty-one, Elizabeth received two hundred pounds from the money raised for the support of Burns's family.

When Burns contemplated emigration to Jamaica, he made over his heritable property and the profits from the 'Kilmarnock Edition' of his poems to his brother, Gilbert Burns, to enable him to bring up Elizabeth as if she was one of his own.

== See also ==
- Jean Armour
- Alison Begbie or Elizabeth Gebbie
- Nelly Blair
- May Cameron
- Mary Campbell (Highland Mary)
- Jenny Clow
- Nelly Kilpatrick
- Jessie Lewars
- Ann Park
- Peggy Thompson
- Isabella Burns
