= Jenny Clow =

Scottish domestic worker & mistress of Robert Burns (1766–1792)

- Born: c. 1766; Newburgh, Scotland
- Died: 1792; Scotland
- Occupation: Domestic Servant

Janet, Jennie or Jenny Clow was a domestic servant to Mrs Agnes Maclehose, née Craig (1759–1841), the Clarinda to Robert Burns' Sylvander. She was the daughter of Andrew (or Alexander) Clow and Margaret Inglis from Fife and was the youngest of eight children. Her mistress sent her to deliver a letter to the poet and he seduced her.

== Life and character ==
Following an affair with Robert Burns while he was in Edinburgh, the twenty-year-old Jenny Clow gave birth in November 1788 to his child, Robert Burns Clow, She is said to have had a port wine birthmark that caused her embarrassment in public situations. Jenny died three years later from TB.

=== Association with Robert Burns ===
Robert Ainslie had written to tell Robert about Jenny's condition, just a year after writing a similar letter regarding May Cameron. In his reply the poet wrote "I am vexed at that affair of the girl, but dare not enlarge on the subject until you send me direction, as I suppose that will be altered on your late Master and Friend's death." He goes on to describe how he was duped over a silhouette, as if this matter concerning a few shillings concerned him more than Jenny's condition. No further correspondence with Robert Ainslie over Jenny survives.

On 6 January 1789 a letter written at Ellisland Farm to Mr Robert Ainslie makes it clear that Jenny Clow had served Burns with a writ and he intended to travel to Edinburgh, to "settle that matter with her, and free her hand of the process". She was suffering at this time from TB, from which she eventually died in January 1792.

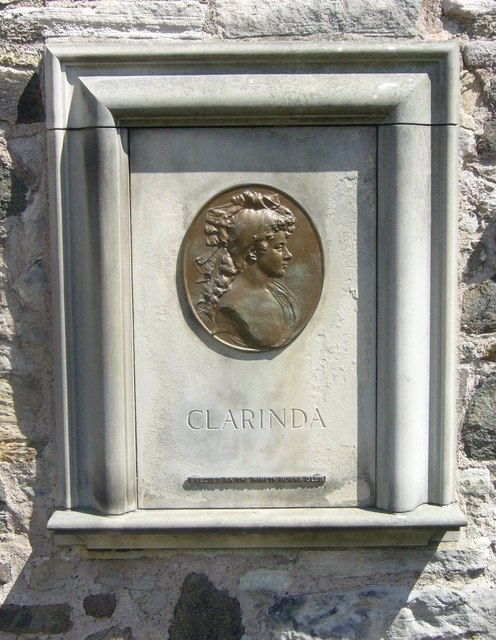
Agnes Maclehose's gravestone.

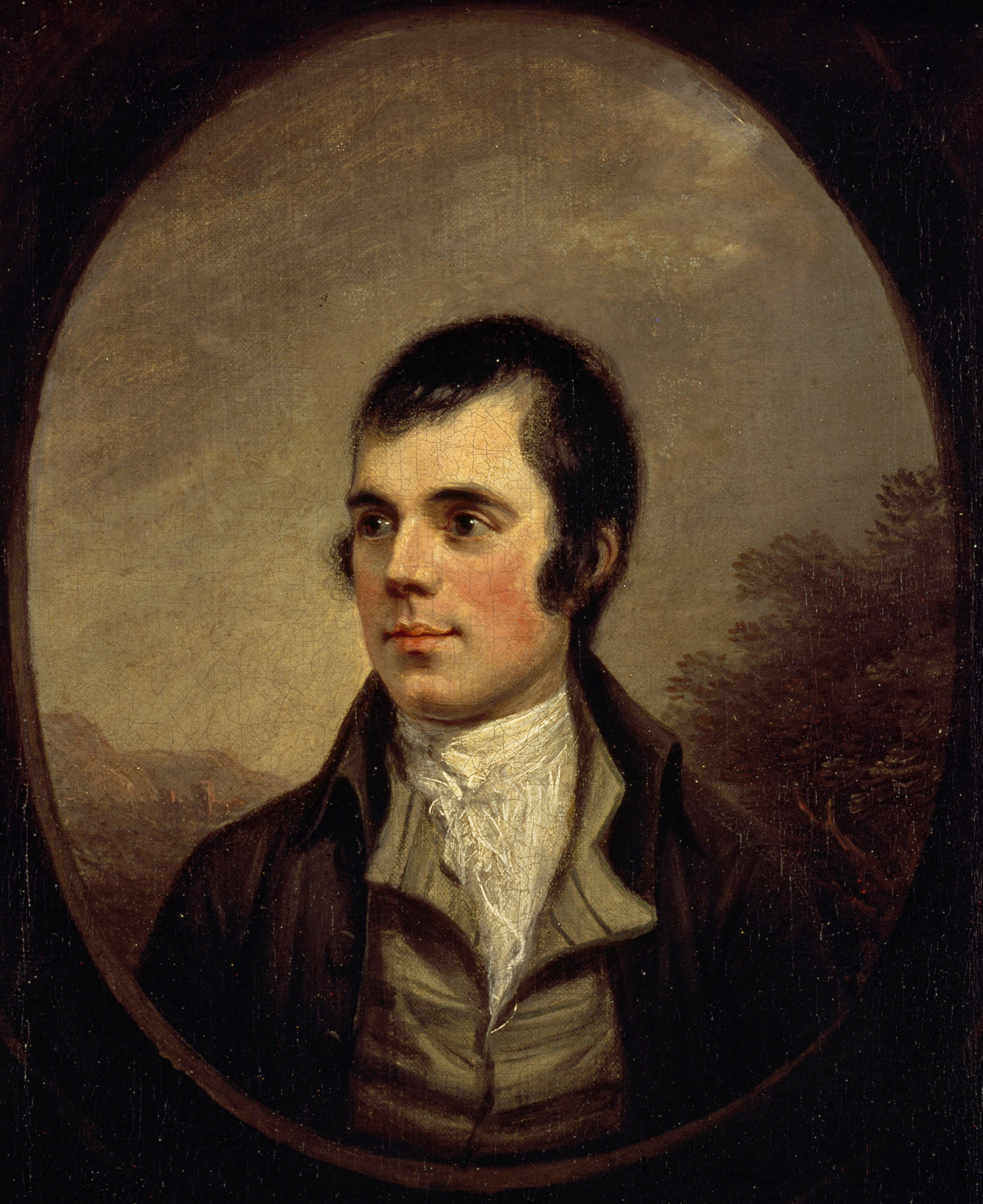
Full view of the Naysmith 1787 portrait of Burns, Scottish National Portrait Gallery

Whilst he was in Dumfries in November 1791, three years after the birth of Robert Burns Clow, Robert Burns received a letter from Agnes McLehose, informing him that Jenny Clow "to all appearances is at this moment dying. Obliged, from all the symptoms of a rapid decay, to quit her service, she is gone to a room almost without common necessaries, untended and unmourned. In circumstances so distressing, to whom can she so naturally look for aid as to the father of her child, the man for whose sake she has suffered many a sad and anxious night, shut from the world, with no other companions than guilt and solitude? You have now an opportunity to evince you indeed possess those fine feelings you have delineated, so as to claim the just admiration of your country. I am convinced I need add nothing farther to persuade you to act as every consideration of humanity must dictate." Burns asked Mrs McLehose to get a porter to take five shillings from him to Jenny Clow.

"Oh Jenny’s a weet, poor body,
Jenny’s seldom dry,
She draigl’t a’ her petticoats,
Comin thro’ the rye"!

In November 1791 Burns obtained a week's leave from the excise and went to Edinburgh to meet with the dying Jenny Clow. He stayed at the White Hart Inn, and within a few hours of his arrival had tracked Jenny down, giving her an undisclosed sum of money.

== Robert Burns Clow ==
Jenny Clow and Robert Burns' son, Robert Burns Clow, was born in Edinburgh in 1788. Robert Burns was willing to take the baby into his home, but his mother would not part with him. He later became a wealthy merchant in London. Robert married and had a son, also Robert Burns Clow, who went to Borneo, married a chief's daughter and was killed by pirates. He had been given his father's names, as this was the custom at the time. Although he named his own son after Robert Burns, he never capitalised on the link with his famous poet father.

== Clarinda's Reply ==
A Scottish Musical Play, written by Mike Gibb and Kevin Walsh about Agnes or Nancy McLehose, mainly focusing on her unconsummated love affair with Robert Burns, while also highlighting the poet's relationship with Jenny Clow.

== See also ==
- Jean Armour
- Alison Begbie
- May Cameron
- Mary Campbell (Highland Mary)
- Jean Gardner
- Nelly Kilpatrick
- Peggy Thompson
- Ann Park
- Elizabeth Paton
- Kate Kemp
