= Peggy Thompson =

Scottish housekeeper

- Born: Ayrshire, Scotland
- Died: Scotland
- Occupations: Housekeeper and wife to John Neilson

Margaret "Peggy" Thompson, later Margaret Neilson, was the housekeeper at Coilsfield House or Montgomery Castle in Ayrshire, Scotland. She married John Neilsen of Monyfee. The couple lived at Minnybae Farm near Kirkoswald. She was the 'charming Fillette' of Robert Burns fame and her husband was an old acquaintance of the poet.

It was on 23 August 1775 that she was first seen in her garden by Burns when he was out at noon in the school's backyard measuring the altitude of the sun.

Peggy in later life moved to Ayr where her children still lived in 1840.

== Association with Robert Burns ==
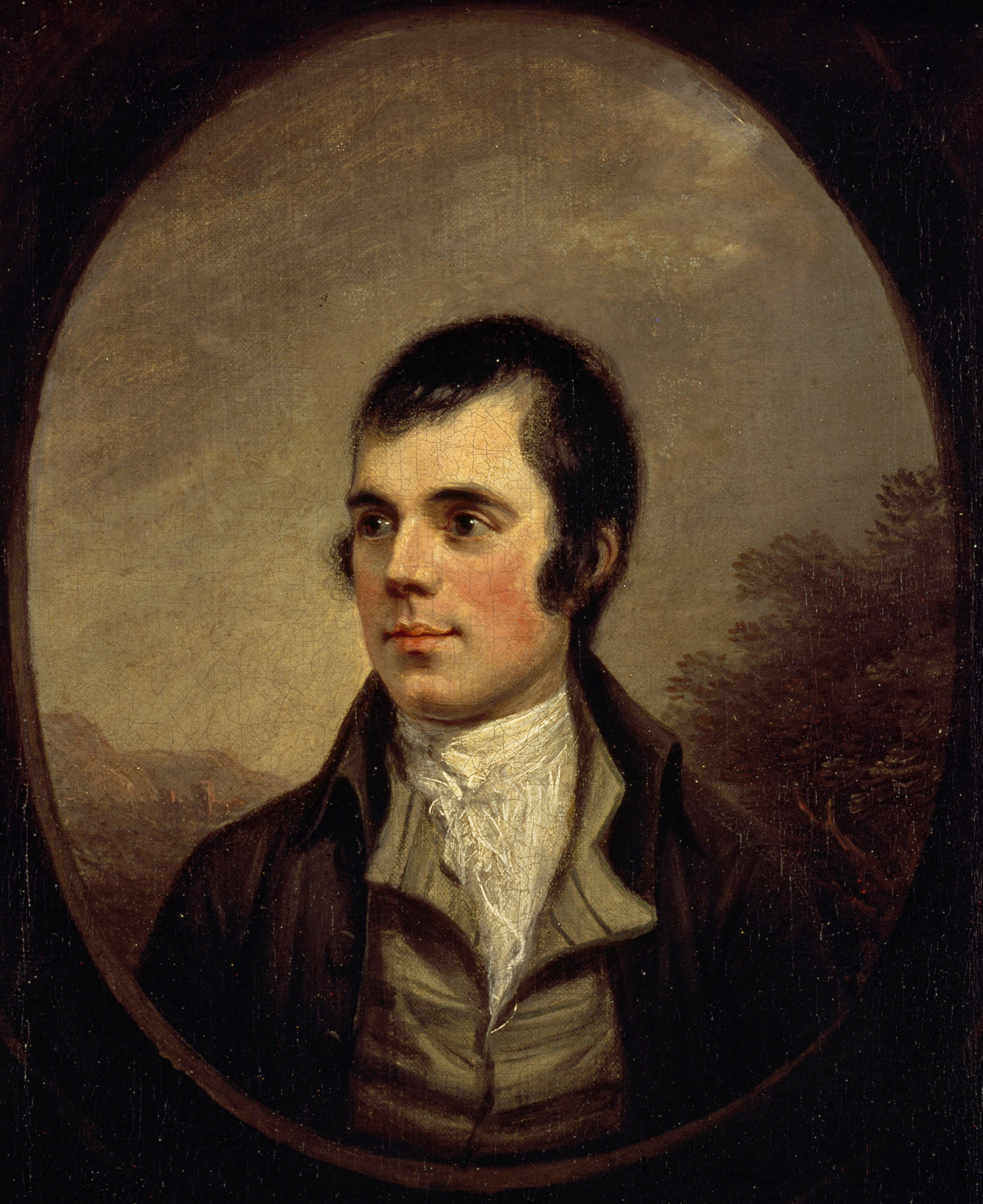
Full view of the Naysmith portrait of 1787, Scottish National Portrait Gallery

As stated Burns first met her when he was studying at Kirkoswald school in the summer of 1775 under the schoolmaster Hugh Rodger (1726-1797). She lived with her parents, next door to the school, and Robert Burns recorded that she "over-set my trigonometry, and set me off in a Tangent from the sphere of my studies".

Robert Burns met Peggy Thompson frequently at Tarboth or Tarbolton Mill and they attended the same kirk. They developed a degree of intimacy even though she was engaged at the time. Burns said "Peggy was my Deity for six or eight months".

He also states that -

"I met with my Angel.... It was vain to think of doing any more good at school. The remaining week I staid, I did nothing but craze the faculties of my soul about her, or steal out to meet with her; and the two last nights of my stay in the country, had sleep been a mortal sin, I was innocent. I returned home very considerably improved..."

Thomas Orr, a fellow pupil at Kirkoswald, stated that he carried letters between Burns and Peggy in the summers of 1782 and 1783. Upon her marriage Burns wrote "I am very glad that Peggy is off my hands as I am at present embarrassed enough without her" .. no doubt a reference to Elizabeth Paton's pregnancy.

In 1785, ten years later, while he was making plans to emigrate, Burns presented Peggy with a copy of his poems, having composed a special inscription for her on the fly leaf, namely "To an old Sweetheart."

"Once fondly lov'd, and still remember'd dear,
Sweet early object of my youthful vows,
Accept this mark of friendship, warm, sincere,
Friendship! 'tis all cold duty now allows.
And when you read the simple, artless rhymes,
One friendly sigh for him - he asks no more,
Who, distant, burns in flaming, torrid climes,
Or haply lies beneath th'Atlantic roar.

The poem "Composed in August" is said to have been inspired by Peggy when he met her again later as Mrs. Neilsen.

Written in the first volume of the Glenriddell Manuscript, with a note in Burns's hand is to be found:

"... Poor Peggy! Her husband is an old acquaintance and a most worthy fellow. When I was taking leave of my Carrick relations, intending to go to the West Indies, when I took farewell of her, neither she nor I could speak a syllable. — Her husband escorted me three miles on my road, and we both parted with tears."

== Micro-history ==
Peggy's surname is given the spelling 'Thomson' by some authors.

Burns did not lodge in Kirkoswald during his stay in 1775, instead he lodged at Ballochneil Farm about a mile away from the village with his uncle, Samuel Broun.

== See also ==
- Jean Armour
- Alison Begbie
- May Cameron
- Mary Campbell (Highland Mary)
- Jean Gardner
- Nelly Kilpatrick
- Jessie Lewars
- Agnes Maclehose
- Ann Park
- Elizabeth Paton
- Isabella Steven
- Kate Kemp
