= Robert Aiken =

Scottish lawyer

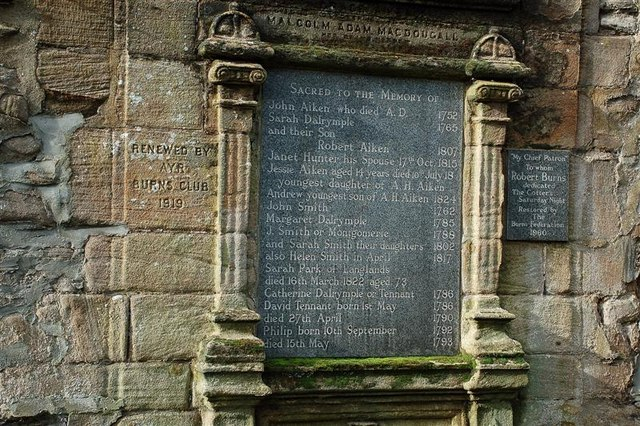
- Memorial to Robert Aiken and his family, Auld Kirk, Ayr
- Born: August 23, 1739; Ayr, Scotland
- Died: March 24, 1807 (aged 67); Ayr, Scotland
- Occupation: Lawyer or Writer

Robert Aiken was one of Robert Burns's closest friends and greatest admirers. He was born in 1739 in Ayr, Scotland. His father John Aiken, was a sea captain who owned his own ships and his mother was Sarah Dalrymple, distantly related to the Dalrymples of Stair. He became a writer or lawyer in Ayr and was referred to by Burns as "Orator Bob" in his poem "The Kirk's Alarm". Robert was famous for the power, beauty and quality of his oratory as his nickname infers.

== Life and character ==
Robert was a prosperous and convivial individual, small in stature and rotund. He married Janet Hunter on 25 March 1771. She died on 17 October 1815 and is buried with her husband, who died aged 78 in 1807, in the Auld Kirk graveyard, Ayr. He was a cousin to the Earl of Glencairn and as stated had links with the Dalrymple family of Stair.

As stated Robert was famous for his powers of oratory and Burns gave him the nickname Orator Bob in "The Kirk's Alarm":

Town of Ayr, town of Ayr,
It was mad, I declare,
To meddle wi' mischief a-brewing;
Provost John is still deaf
To the church's relief,
And orator Bob is its ruin

Aiken was a member of the committee of the Ayr Library Society, which allowed subscribers access to the latest books published. As an officer of the society he was one of those who burned Thomas Paine’s works under government orders.

The Aiken family memorial at the Auld Kirk in Ayr was renewed in 1919 by the Ayr Burns Club and restored by the Robert Burns World Federation in 1960 as recorded on the monument. The A.H.Aiken mentioned several times was his son Andrew Hunter Aiken.

== Association with Robert Burns ==
Robert is thought to have first met Burns in 1783. Burns commented that until he had heard Robert Aiken reading his poetry aloud he had failed to fully appreciate it. In letters to their mutual friend John Ballantyne that year, he describes Aiken as his "first poetic patron" and "first kind patron".

In a letter to Robert Aiken in December 1786 Burns refers to him as "Dear Patron of my Virgin Muse" and that has been interpreted as inferring that he may have been an intermediary in Burns's introduction to William Smellie and William Creech, his printer and publisher for the Poems, Chiefly in the Scottish Dialect (Edinburgh Edition). He had previously collected nearly a quarter (145 copies) of all subscriptions for Burns's Kilmarnock Edition.

Burn's wrote that "I have found Creech, who is my agent forsooth, and Mr Smellie who is to be my printer, that honor and goodness of heart which I always expected in Mr Aiken's friends."

In February 1786 he wrote to his friend John Richmond saying "My chief patron is Mr Aiken in Ayr who is pleased to express great approbation of my works".

"The Cotter's Saturday Night" first published in the Kilmarnock Edition of 1786 was dedicated to Aiken by Burns and in the first verse he compliments his friend:

My lov'd, much honour'd, much respected friend!
No mercenary bard his homage pays;
With honest pride, I scorn each selfish end,
My dearest meed, a friend's esteem and praise:
To you I sing, in simple Scottish lays,
The lowly train in life's sequester'd scene;
The native feelings strong, the guileless ways;
What Aiken in a cottage would have been;
Ah! tho his worth unknown, far happier there I ween!

"Holy Willie's Prayer" was inspired by Robert Aiken's "Glib-tongued Aiken's" successful defence of Gavin Hamilton in the summer of 1785 before the Presbytery of Ayr and the Synod in a dispute with the Rev. William Auld and the Kirk Session.

Burns expressed his admiration for his friend in the following "Epitaph for Robert Aiken Esq";

"Know thou, O stranger to the fame
Of this much lov'd, much honoured name
(For none that knew him need be told)
A warmer heart death ne'er made cold".

Robert Aiken was Surveyor of Taxes and it is through him in 1786 that we have a list of the carriages, riding-horses, wives, servants, children, etc. in the Burns family farm at Mossgiel.

Sir, as your mandate did request,
I send you here a faithfu' list,
O' gudes an' gear, an' a' my graith,
To which I'm clear to gi'e my aith.

Imprimis, then, for carriage cattle,
I hae four brutes o' gallant mettle,
As ever drew afore a pettle.
My hand-afore 's a guid auld has-been,
An' wight an' wilfu' a' his days been:
My hand-ahin 's a weel gaun fillie,
That aft has borne me hame frae Killie.
An' your auld borough mony a time
In days when riding was nae crime.
But ance, when in my wooing pride
I, like a blockhead, boost to ride,
The wilfu' creature sae I pat to,
(Lord pardon a' my sins, an' that too!)
I play'd my fillie sic a shavie,
She's a' bedevil'd wi' the spavie.
My furr-ahin 's a wordy beast,
As e'er in tug or tow was traced.
The fourth's a Highland Donald hastle,
A damn'd red-wud Kilburnie blastie!
Foreby a cowt, o' cowts the wale,
As ever ran afore a tail:
Gin he be spar'd to be a beast,
He'll draw me fifteen pund at least.
Wheel-carriages I ha'e but few,
Three carts, an' twa are feckly new;
An auld wheelbarrow, mair for token,
Ae leg an' baith the trams are broken;
I made a poker o' the spin'le,
An' my auld mither brunt the trin'le.

For men, I've three mischievous boys,
Run-deils for ranting an' for noise;
A gaudsman ane, a thrasher t' other:
Wee Davock hauds the nowt in fother.
I rule them as I ought, discreetly,
An' aften labour them completely;
An' aye on Sundays duly, nightly,
I on the Questions targe them tightly;
Till, faith! wee Davock's grown sae gleg,
Tho' scarcely langer than your leg,
He'll screed you aff Effectual Calling,
As fast as ony in the dwalling.

I've nane in female servant station,
(Lord keep me aye frae a' temptation!)
I hae nae wife-and thay my bliss is,
An' ye have laid nae tax on misses;
An' then, if kirk folks dinna clutch me,
I ken the deevils darena touch me.
Wi' weans I'm mair than weel contented,
Heav'n sent me ane mae than I wanted!
My sonsie, smirking, dear-bought Bess,
She stares the daddy in her face,
Enough of ought ye like but grace;
But her, my bonie, sweet wee lady,
I've paid enough for her already;
An' gin ye tax her or her mither,
By the Lord, ye'se get them a' thegither!

And now, remember, Mr. Aiken,
Nae kind of licence out I'm takin:
Frae this time forth, I do declare
I'se ne'er ride horse nor hizzie mair;
Thro' dirt and dub for life I'll paidle,
Ere I sae dear pay for a saddle;
My travel a' on foot I'll shank it,
I've sturdy bearers, Gude the thankit!
The kirk and you may tak you that,
It puts but little in your pat;
Sae dinna put me in your beuk,
Nor for my ten white shillings leuk.

This list, wi' my ain hand I wrote it,
The day and date as under noted;
Then know all ye whom it concerns,
Subscripsi huic,

Robert Burns.
Mossgiel.

Aiken's daughter Grace stated that a clerk in her father's legal office lost or possibly stole most of the letters that Burns had written to him, with only seven surviving, including one from October 1786 that contains Burns's first thoughts on joining the excise service.

Robert Aiken may have approached Patrick Douglas of Garallan regarding Burns's wish to emigrate to Jamaica, what is certain is that he was offered a job as a book-keeper on Douglas's plantation near Port Antonio.

Aiken took a keen interest in the Alloway Burns Club. The first Immortal Memory was written by Hamilton Paul who was asked by Aiken to meet him before the first Burns Supper of July 1801: "The Club was to dine in Burns’s Cottage. Mr Aiken and I took a walk before dinner towards Allowa Kirk. He requested me to show him the ode which I had prepared for the occasion. He read a verse or two and walked a few paces without speaking – at last he said with great emotion – in a flattering tone – ‘That will do – there are two Criteria by which I judge of the merit of a production of this kind. First my eyes are suffused – next the button of my waistcoat skelps.’ He was dressed in a Brown coat and a snow white vest which actually burst open".

He both chaired or simply attended the club's 'Burns Suppers' until his death in 1807 and Hamilton Paul recounted the following at the 1808 supper:

Lamented Aiken, first I hail thy name,
Whose pure benevolent regard
Gave counsel to the youthful Bard,
Admir’d and ‘read him into fame.’

=== Epistle to a Young Friend ===
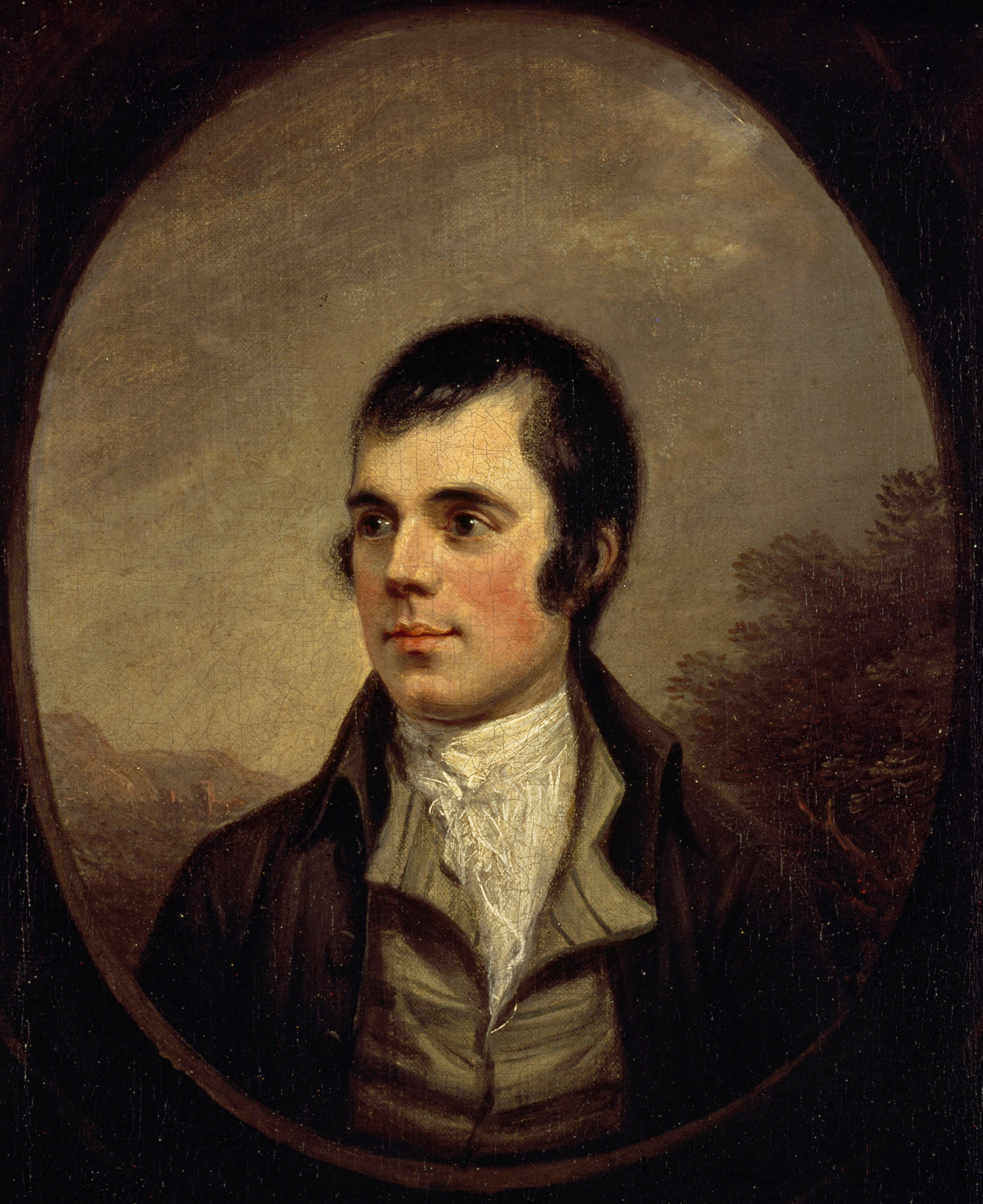
Full view of the Naysmith portrait of 1787, Scottish National Portrait Gallery

The "Epistle to a Young Friend" was written by Robert Burns for Andrew Hunter Aiken, Robert Aiken's eldest son. The poem inspired General Sam Houston and he wrote to his son saying that "I would commend to your particular attention a poem of Burns. It is his advice to a young friend, Andrew. I have found it one of the most salutary as well as one of the safest guides I have met with in life".

Andrew's eldest son, Peter, owned the original holograph of Burns's "The Cotter's Saturday Night" and chaired the 1859 Robert Burns celebrations in Bristol.

=== Robert Aiken and Burns' marriage to Jean Armour ===
James Armour went to Robert Aiken on the 15 April 1786 in order to try and annul the irregular but valid marriage of Jean Armour and Robert Burns. James probably did not approach a lawyer in Mauchline as Gavin Hamilton and his partner and brother were New Licht and James was a staunch Auld Licht. Some reports suggest that the marriage paper was held by Robert Aiken, however the earliest records state that it was in the possession of Jean Armour herself. It is said that to appease Jean's father he cut the names of the couple from the marriage document although this would probably not have altered the situation in the eyes of the law.

Burns wrote to Gavin Hamilton regarding the incident saying: "I must consult you, first opportunity, on the propriety of sending my quondam friend, Mr Aiken, a copy. If he is now reconciled to my character as an honest man, I would do it with all my soul; but I would not be beholden to the noblest being ever God created, if he imagined me to be a rascal."

He went on to detail James Armour's actions: "Apropos, old Mr Armour prevailed with him to mutilate that unlucky paper, yesterday. Would you believe it? tho' I had not a hope, nor even a wish, to make her mine after her conduct; yet when he told me, the names were all cut out of the paper, my heart died within me, and he cut my very veins with the news."

In conclusion he goes on to express his feelings regarding Jean Armour's actions; "Perdition seize her falsehood, and perjurious perfidy! but God bless her and forgive my poor, once-dear, misguided girl. She is ill-advised. do not despise me, Sir: I am indeed a fool, but a "knave" is an infinitely worse character than any body, I hope, will dare to give, the unfortunate Robt Burns".

The letter does not suggest any lasting bad feeling between Burns and Aiken, only a hope that Aiken did not think ill of him under the circumstances and remains his friend. Robert's grandson published a book of 'Memorials to Robert Burns' in which he refuted any breakdown of his grandfather's friendship with Burns and refuted the accusations of his connivance with James Armour over the marriage document.

Allan Cunningham published an undated letter to John Richmond by Burns that suggested that Robert Aiken had been central to the failure of his attempted marriage. Grace Aiken, Robert's daughter, strongly objected to Allan Cunningham's inference, writing that "...while Cunningham ascribes this ERRONEOUSLY to an interruption in the friendship and correspondence of my father and Burns, which NEVER occurred." She made it clear that the missing bundle of letters had been stolen from the family home.

In 1788 Robert and Jean were finally legally married however Burns was surprisingly reticent about it. Gavin Hamilton's eldest daughter Jacobina or 'Beennie' recollected, how even she only became aware of the marriage at breakfast one day when Burns and Robert Aiken were present and upon apologising to Robert Aiken for the lack of his usual boiled egg Burns said "if she cared to send over the way to Mrs Burns she might have some".

== See also ==
- Lesley Baillie
- John Ballantine
- Alison Begbie
- Nelly Blair
- Isabella Burns
- May Cameron
- Mary Campbell (Highland Mary)
- Jenny Clow
- Gavin Hamilton
- Helen Hyslop
- Nelly Kilpatrick
- Jessie Lewars
- John McMurdo
- Anne Rankine
- Isabella Steven
- Peggy Thompson
