= Gavin Hamilton (lawyer) =

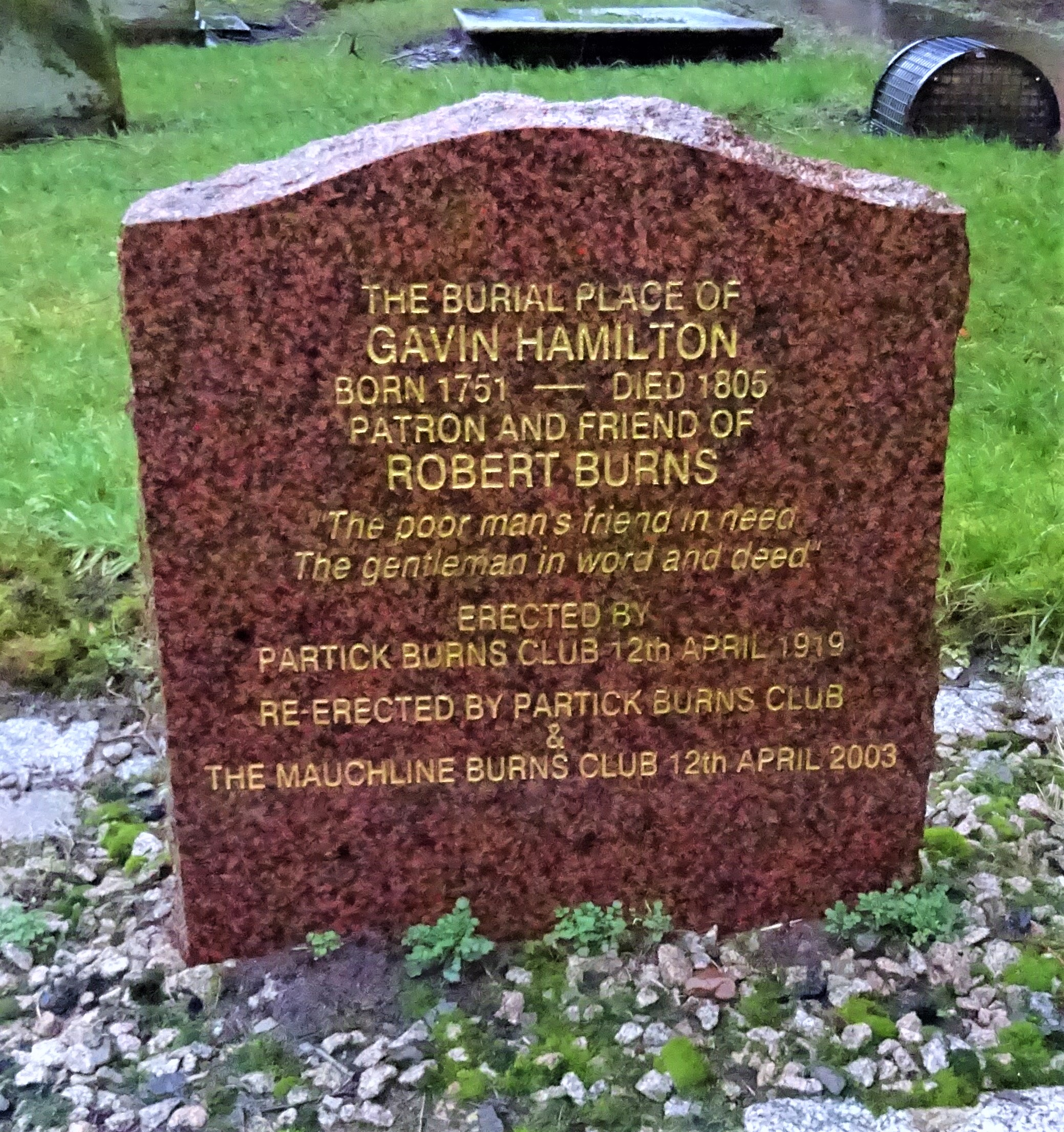
- Gavin Hamilton's memorial stone
- Born: 20 November 1751; Mauchline, Scotland
- Died: 1805. Mauchline, Scotland
- Occupations: Lawyer and Factor to the Earl of Loudoun

Gavin Hamilton (1751–1805) was a Scottish lawyer and one of Robert Burns's closest friends and a patron. The first 'Kilmarnock Edition' of his poems were dedicated to Gavin Hamilton.

== Life and character ==
He was born in 1751 in Mauchline, Scotland. His father, John Hamilton of Kype near Strathaven in Lanarkshire, was a lawyer in Mauchline and clerk to the regality of Mauchline. His mother was Jacobina Young, his father's first wife.

Gavin became a writer or lawyer in Mauchline and a factor or clerk to the Regality of Mauchline to the Earl of Loudoun. Gavin had purchased the Abbot's Tower or Castle of Mauchline and constructed a modern villa adjacent to it, but later sold the property to the Earl of Loudoun and leased it back. Gavin was appointed the collector of stent in 1775 and administered the collection of poor relief within the parish.

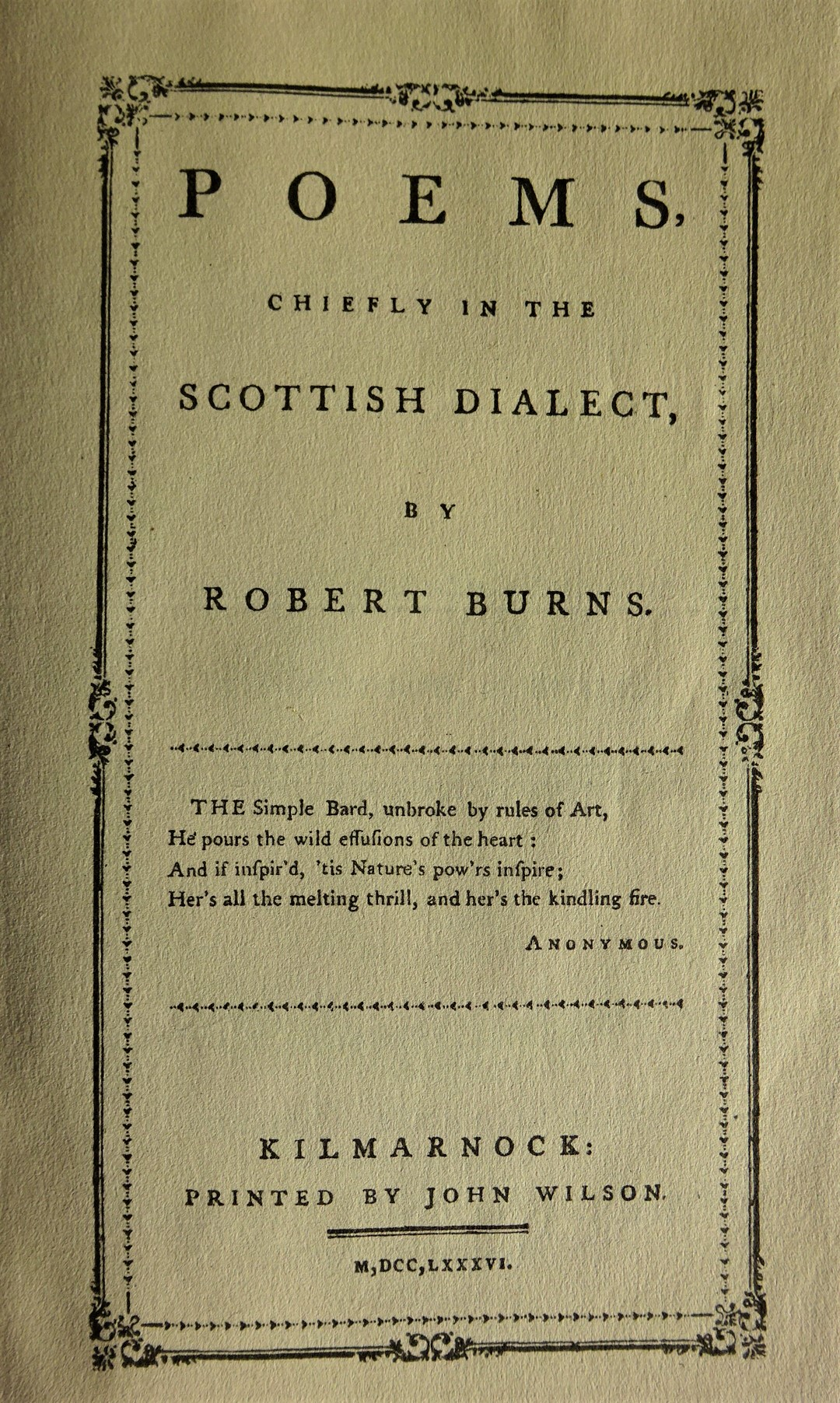
The Kilmarnock Edition of Poems, Chiefly in the Scottish Dialect

Gavin was a fifth son and married Helen Kennedy, eldest daughter of Robert Kennedy of Daljarrock on 10 July 1775, having eight children of his own. He brought up his family in the house attached to the old Abbot's Tower or Castle of Mauchline.

He was a 'New Licht' in his religious views and is described as high spirited, generous, kind, open and engaging, characteristics, all of which endeared him to Burns.

Gavin's great-grandfather had been the curate at Kirkoswald and was an ardent Episcopalian who was thought to have been central in the 1677 incursion by the 'Highland Host' into Ayrshire, a thousand strong and the cause of such physical damage and financial consequence that Ayrshire had not fully recovered in Burns's day. The evidence for this is however is less than certain.

John Kennedy, Factor to the Earl of Dumfries at Dumfries House was Gavin's brother-in-law as well as a close friend and correspondent of Burns.

Burns refers to two of his children, John and "..little Beennie" or Jacobina.

The Gavin Hamilton family memorial at the kirk in Mauchline was erected in 1919 by the Partick Burns Club and was restored by the club in conjunction with the Mauchline Burns Club in 2003 as recorded on the monument.

On 12 April 1919 a memorial to Gavin Hamilton was unveiled at the Burns House Museum in Mauchline by Charles Cowie and possession handed to the Glasgow and District Burns Association.

== Association with Robert Burns ==
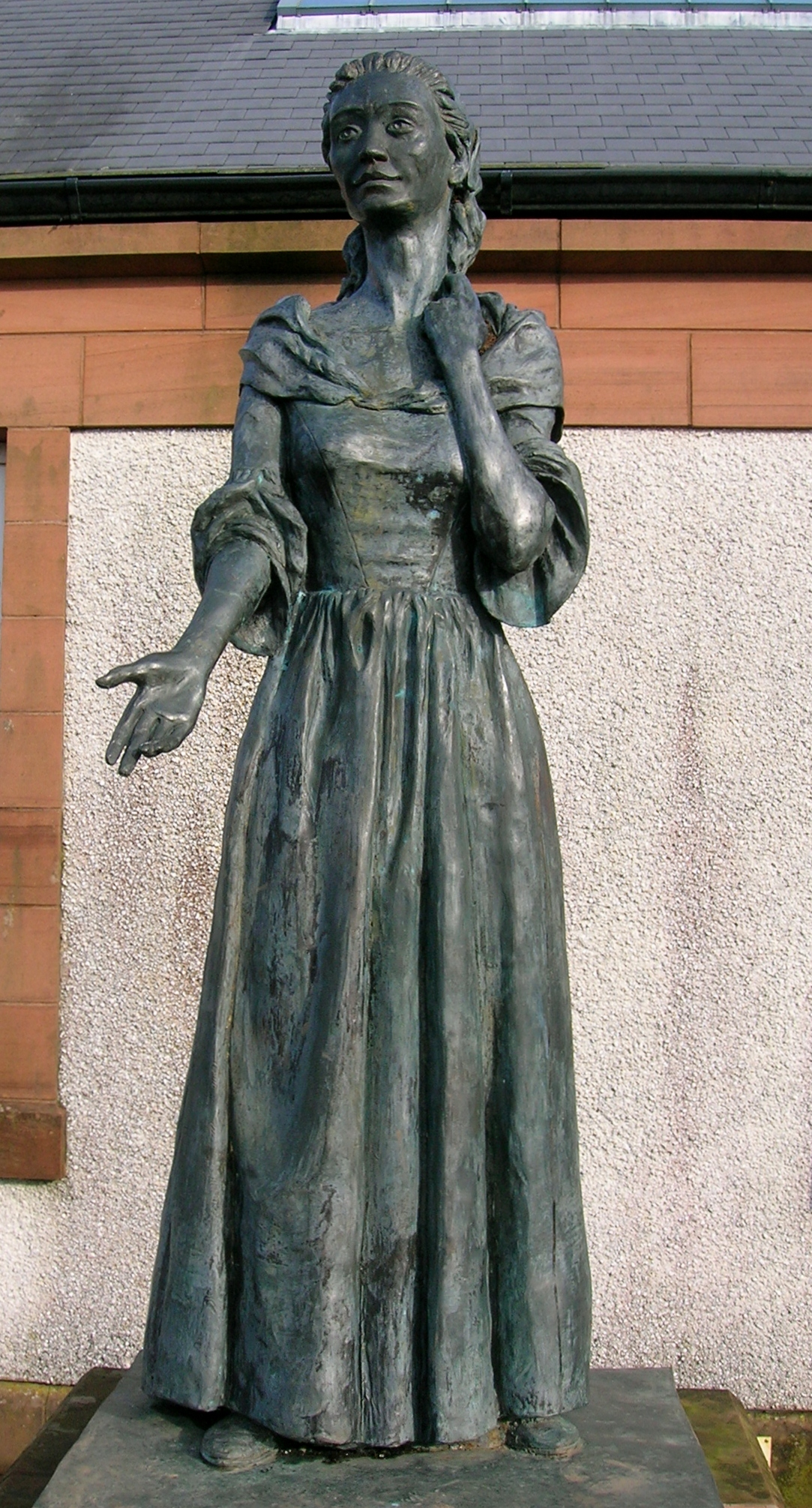
Statue of Jean Armour at Mauchline.

Burns is thought to have first met Gavin Hamilton in 1783, introduced by fellow lawyer Robert Aiken of Ayr. Gavin at first worked with his father and then set up his own office that is thought to have either been in Back Causeway (Castle Street) or Loudoun Street.

Burns dedicated his Kilmarnock edition of Poems Chiefly in the Scottish Dialect to Hamilton who was a subscriber to forty copies as well as distributing many of the 96 proposal forms. In 1786 a letter in the Edinburgh Evening Courant stated "that "not one" of Ayrshire's "Peers, Nabobs, and wealthy commoners" had "stepped forth as a patron" to Burns". Hamilton responded by saying that "the greatest part ... were subscribed for, or bought up by, the gentlemen of Airshire (sic)".

In 1784 Hamilton leased the 118 acre Mossgiel Farm, previously known as Mossgavil, from the Earl of Loudoun with the intention of using it as a summer retreat. His wife, however, was not keen on the arrangement. Mossgavil, as Burns knew it, stands on a ridge of trap or basalt. The name may derive from the Gaelic Mas-geal, pronounced Maos-gheul, 'bleak or fallow ridge', referring to bleak and uncultivated moss.

Gavin instead sub-let the farm to Robert and Gilbert Burns in November 1783 for £90 a year. At this time when their father William Burnes was in litigation with David McLure over the conditions of the lease of Lochlea Farm and had only a few months to live. Mossgiel had been built, at least in part, by Gavin Hamilon only a few years before and was a comfortable residence with a modern spence or parlour. Hamilton may have given legal advice to his friend Burns that this arrangement would best protect the family's financial interests and the sub-let was kept from the brother's father.

Between 1785 and circa May 1786 Gavin employed Mary Campbell, better known as 'Highland Mary', as a nursery maid and Burns probably first met her at his home.

Hamilton drew up a document for Burns that gave the date of 22 May 1785 for the birth of Elizabeth Bishop (Burns), better known as Dear-bought Bess, his daughter and first child with Elizabeth Paton.

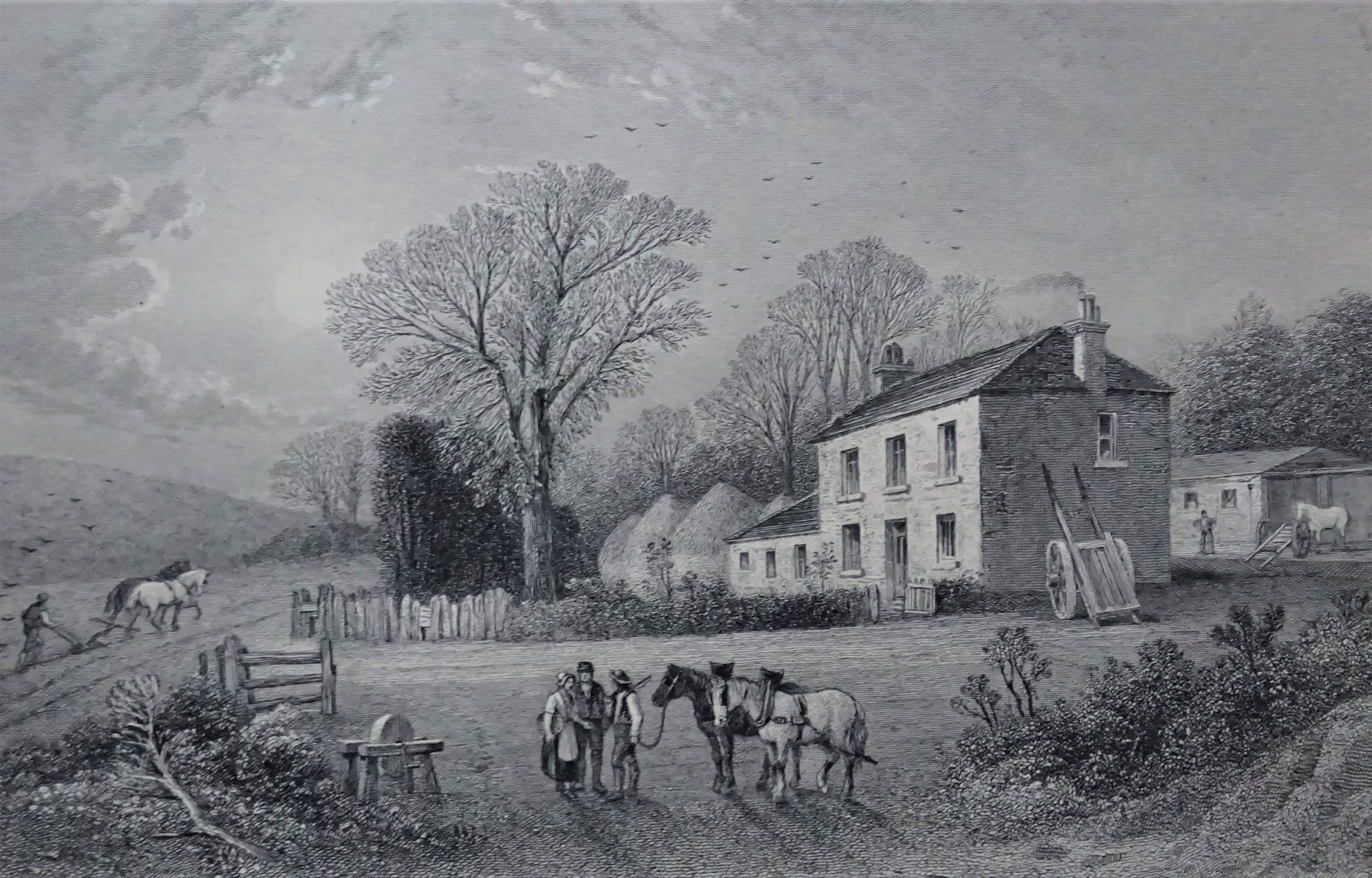
Mossgiel Farm, Mauchline

Hamilton is said to have encouraged Burns in his plans to emigrate to Jamaica and Captain Smith, master of the ship that Burns intended to travel to Jamaica in, was a good friend of Gavin Hamilton. With the printing and success of 'The Kilmarnock Edition' he advised the poet to stay and suggested employment in the excise.

It was Hamilton in 1786 who delivered the letter from Dr Blacklock to Burns that praised the poets works and gave him further encouragement to stay in Scotland.

Hamilton, like Burns, was a Freemason and accompanied the poet to the Newmilns Lodge in March 1786.

Hamilton was a subscriber to 40 copies of the 'Kilmarnock Edition'.

=== Correspondence ===
His half-brothers and sisters lived on the Harvieston estate near Dollar where Burns visited them, writing a detailed record of his visit to Gavin mentioning Grace Hamilton and paying particular attention to Charlotte Hamilton who he named the "Maid of Devon" and later addressed in "The Banks of Devon". He told them that "..the wee curlie John", was "..so good a boy and so fine a scholar".

When in 1786 Burns first arrived in Edinburgh he shared a room with his 'Mauchline' friend John Richmond, a solicitors clerk, who had once worked for Gavin Hamilton and would later become a lawyer in Mauchline himself.

Burns wrote revealingly to Hamilton about Jean Armour during his stay in Edinburgh saying "To tell the truth among friends, I feel a miserable blank in my heart, with want of her, and I don't think I shall ever meet with so delicious an armful again .."

Burns in December 1786 wrote again from Edinburgh saying that "For my own affairs, I am in a fair way of becoming as eminent as Thomas à Kempis or John Bunyan; and you may expect henceforth to see my birthday inscribed among the wonderful events in the Poor Robin and Aberdeen Almanacks along with the Black Monday, and the Battle of Bothwell Bridge."

In February 1788 he writes to Agnes Maclehose that he is on his way to visit Gavin Hamilton and that "I hate myself as an unworthy sinner, because these interviews of old, dear friends make me for half a moment almost forget Clarinda".

=== Gavin Hamilton and Burns's published works ===
In 1786 Burns wrote the following "Epitaph for Gavin Hamilton Esq";

"The poor man weeps here Gavin sleeps
Whom canting wretches blam'd:
But with such as he, where'er he be,
May I be sav'd or dam'd!".

He also oddly placed on page 185, a significant way through the 'Kilmarnock Edition', "A Dedication to Gavin Hamilton Esq." as well as making reference to Gavin in "Holy Willie's Prayer" and describing him in "To the Rev. John McMath". He wrote "To Mr Gavin Hamilton Esq., Mauchline. Recommending a boy, Mossgaville, May 3, 1786" and dedicated "Nature's Law" to him, not printed until as late a date as 1830 in the Aldine Edition of his works.

The first stanza of "A Dedication to Gavin Hamilton Esq.":

"Expect na, sir, in this narration,
A fleechan, fleth'ran Dedication,
To roose you up, an' ca' you guid,
An' sprung o' great an' noble bluid;
Because ye're surnam'd like His Grace,
Perhaps related to the race:
Then, when I'm tir'd - and sae are ye,
Wi' mony a fulsome, sinfu' lie,
Set up a face, how I stop short,
For fear your modesty be hurt".

First published in the 1786 'Kilmarnock Edition' of his poems.

The first stanza of "To Mr Gavin Hamilton Esq., Mauchline. Recommending a boy, Mossgaville, May 3, 1786" :

"I hold it, sir, my bounden duty
To warn you how that MASTER TOOTIE,
Alias, Laird M'Gawn,
Was here to hire yon lad away
'Bout whom ye spak the tither day,
An' wad hae don't aff han':
But lest he learn the callan tricks,
As faith I muckle doubt him,
Like scrapin out auld Crummie's nicks,
An' tellin lies about them;
As lieve then I'd have then
Your CLERKSHIP he should sair;
If sae be ye may be
Not fitted otherwhere".

First printed in 1808 by Cromek in "Reliques of Robert Burns". Burns was leasing a fairly new house that Gavin Hamilton had built, hence the word play on Mossgaville for his 'villa' home rather than 'Mossgavill' or the familiar 'Mossgiel'. Burns was hoping that Hamilton would take the boy who had worked for him as an apprentice rather than the fate of going to work for McGaun, a cattle dealer, who had a poor reputation, one being the habit of scraping cow's horns that had the effect of making them look younger!

The stanza from "To the Rev. John McMath" describing Gavin Hamilton:

"There's Gaw'n, misca'd waur than a beast,
Wha has mair honour in his breast
Than mony scores as guid's the priest
Wha sae abus'd him:
And may a bard no crack his jest
What way they've us'd him?"

The first stanza from "Nature's Law. Humbly Inscribed to Gavin Hamilton, Esq."

Let other heroes boast their scars,
The marks o' sturt and strife;
And other poets sing of wars,
The plagues o' human life;
Shame fa' the fun; wi' sword and gun
To slap mankind like lumber!
I sing his name, and nobler fame,
Wha multiplies our number.

Not published until 1830 in the Aldine edition of Burns's works.

=== The language of refusal incident ===
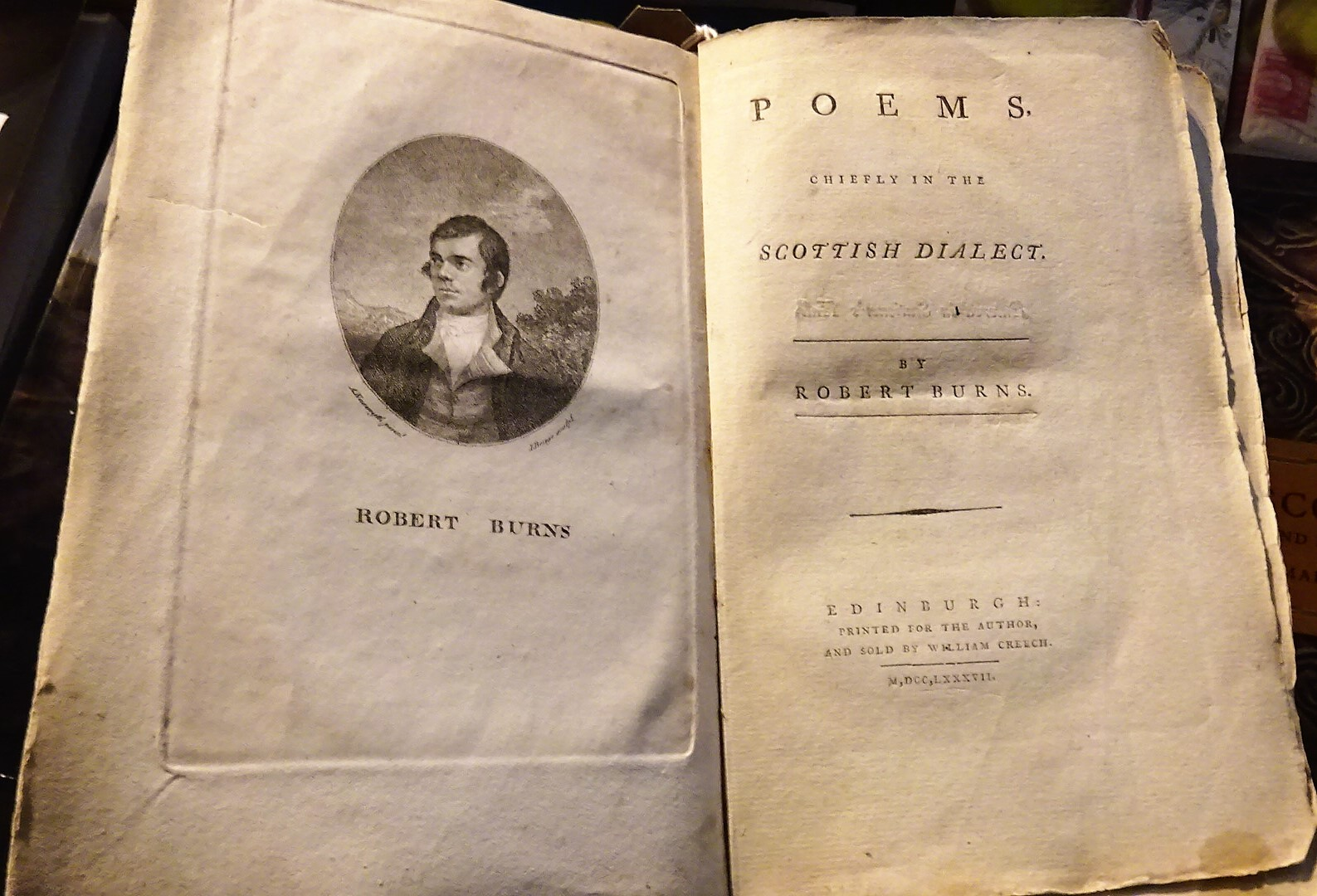
The 1787 Edinburgh Edition of Poems, Chiefly in the Scottish Dialect

In 1788 Hamilton wrote to Burns requesting that he act as guarantor for his brother Gilbert Burns for a considerable sum, presumably unpaid rent for Mossgiel Farm, however Burns felt that he had to refuse, writing that :

"The language of refusal is to me the most difficult language on earth, and you are the man of the world, excepting One of Rt Honble designation, to whom it gives me the greatest pain to hold such language. My brother has already got money, and shall want nothing in my power to enable him to fulfil his engagement with you; but to be security on so large a scale, even for a brother, is what I dare not do, except I were in such circumstances of life as that the worst might happen could not greatly injure me. I never wrote a letter which gave me so much pain in my life, as I know the unhappy consequences: I shall incur the displeasure of a Gentleman for whom I have the highest respect, and to whom I am deeply obliged"

To assist with his debts Burns had given Gilbert £180 earned from his Poems, Chiefly in the Scottish Dialect (Edinburgh Edition). This enabled Gilbert to remain at Mossgiel until 1797.

This 'ruinous bargain' situation led to a considerable cooling of their friendship or even an effective termination of it from around March 1788 onwards.

Hamilton may not have taken this jocular letter in the manner intended, cooling their friendship.

In July 1793 Burns wrote his last letter to Hamilton, laced with some amusing observations on marriage, but primarily seeking his help in settling the estate of William Muir of Tarbolton or 'Willie's Mill' on behalf of Mrs Muir.

=== The Calves challenge ===
Burns called at Hamilton's house on his way to church one Sunday, only to find that his friend had gout and could not attend. Hamilton set Burns a challenge that he would not be able to give a poetic account of the subject of the sermon in no fewer four stanzas with the poem to be delivered soon after the end of the service at supper with Hamilton. A visiting minister, the Rev. James Steven, had chosen the text "And ye shall go forth, as calves of the stall" from Malachi Ch.IV, Verse 2. Burns won the wager and the original stanzas now form verses two to five of "The Calf".

Two of the original stanzas from "The Calf":

"Tho' when some kind connubial dear
Your but-and-ben adorns,
The like has been that you may
A noble head of horns.

And, in your lug, most reverend James,
To hear you roar and rowt,
Few men o' sense will doubt your claims
To rank amang the nowt".

It was first published in the 1787 Poems, Chiefly in the Scottish Dialect (Edinburgh Edition) without the minister's name included however various pamphlets were issued pirating the poem and the name became common knowledge with a result that the Rev. Steven, of London and finally Kilwinning parish, came to bear the nickname "The Calf".

== Gavin Hamilton and Burns's marriages to Jean Armour ==
Burns was on his way to visit Gavin Hamilton when his dog ran over some clothes on the bleach green at Mauchline and Jean Armour scolded and threw something at the animal. This is said to be the first meeting between Robert and Jean.

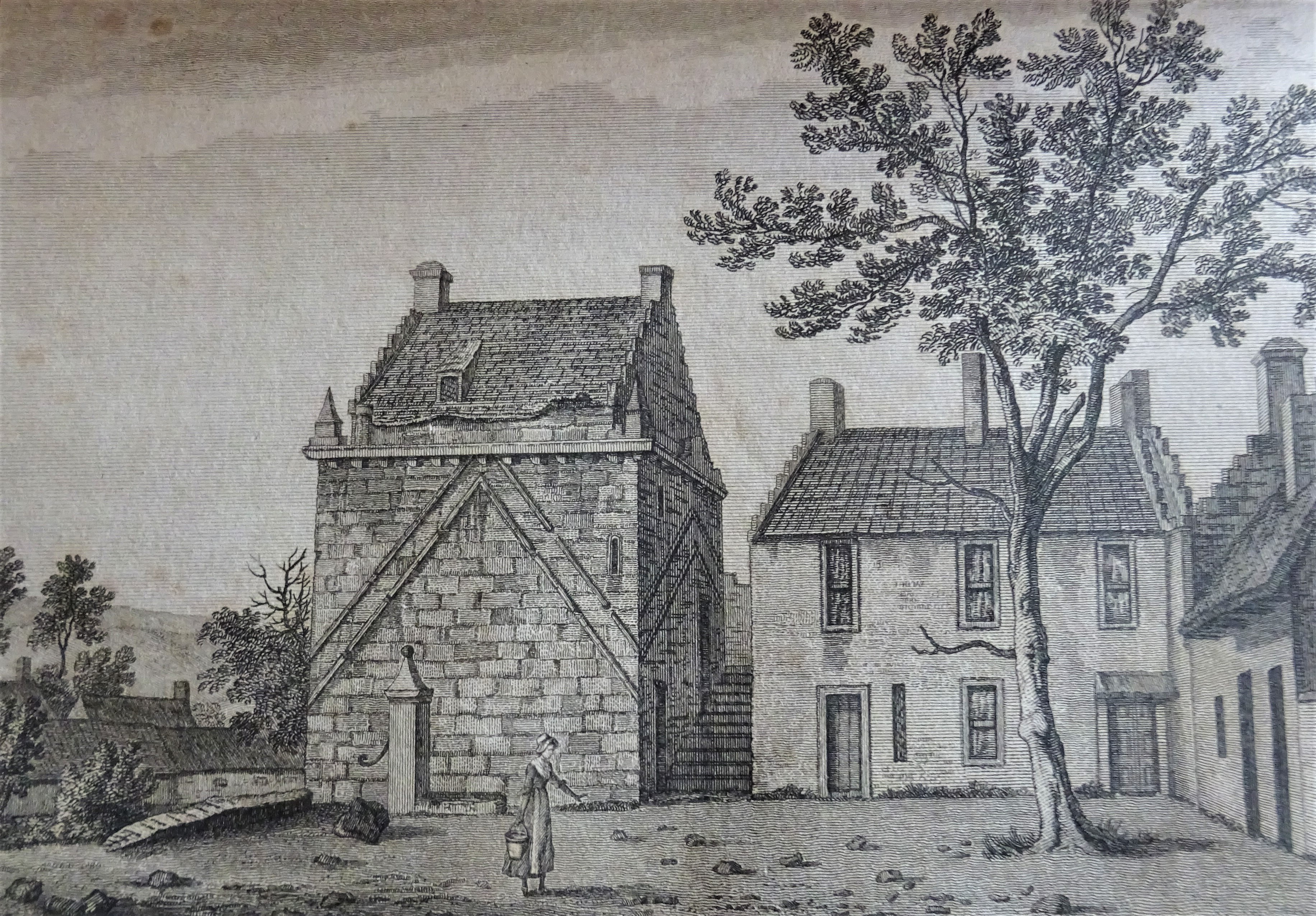
The Abbot's Tower and Gavin Hamilton's house at Mauchline.

James Armour went to Robert Aiken on the 15 April 1786 in order to try and annul the irregular but valid marriage of Jean Armour and Robert Burns. James probably did not approach a lawyer in Mauchline as Gavin Hamilton was a friend of Burns and in addition his partner and brother were New Licht and James was a staunch Auld Licht adherent.

It is said that to appease Jean's father, Robert Aiken, who had his practice in Ayr, cut the names of the couple from the marriage document although this would probably not have altered the situation in the eyes of the law. Burns wrote to Gavin Hamilton regarding the incident saying: "I must consult you, first opportunity, on the propriety of sending my quondam friend, Mr Aiken, a copy. If he is now reconciled to my character as an honest man, I would do it with all my soul; but I would not be beholden to the noblest being ever God created, if he imagined me to be a rascal."

He went on to detail James Armour's actions: "Apropos, old Mr Armour prevailed with him to mutilate that unlucky paper, yesterday. Would you believe it? tho' I had not a hope, nor even a wish, to make her mine after her conduct; yet when he told me, the names were all cut out of the paper, my heart died within me, and he cut my very veins with the news."

In conclusion he goes on to express his feelings regarding Jean Armour's actions; "Perdition seize her falsehood, and perjurious perfidy! but God bless her and forgive my poor, once-dear, misguided girl. She is ill-advised. do not despise me, Sir: I am indeed a fool, but a "knave" is an infinitely worse character than any body, I hope, will dare to give, the unfortunate Robt Burns".

On 2 May 1788 Robert and Jean were finally irregularly, but legally married, probably in the parlour or office of Gavin Hamilton's house by Justice of the Peace, John Farquhar-Gray of Gilmilnscroft.

Burns however was surprisingly reticent about the marriage. Hamilton's eldest daughter Jacobina recollected, how even she only became aware of the marriage at breakfast one day when Burns and Robert Aiken were present and upon apologising to Robert Aiken for the lack of his usual boiled egg Burns said "if she cared to send over the way to Mrs Burns she might have some".

== Conflict & legal action with the Rev. William Auld ==
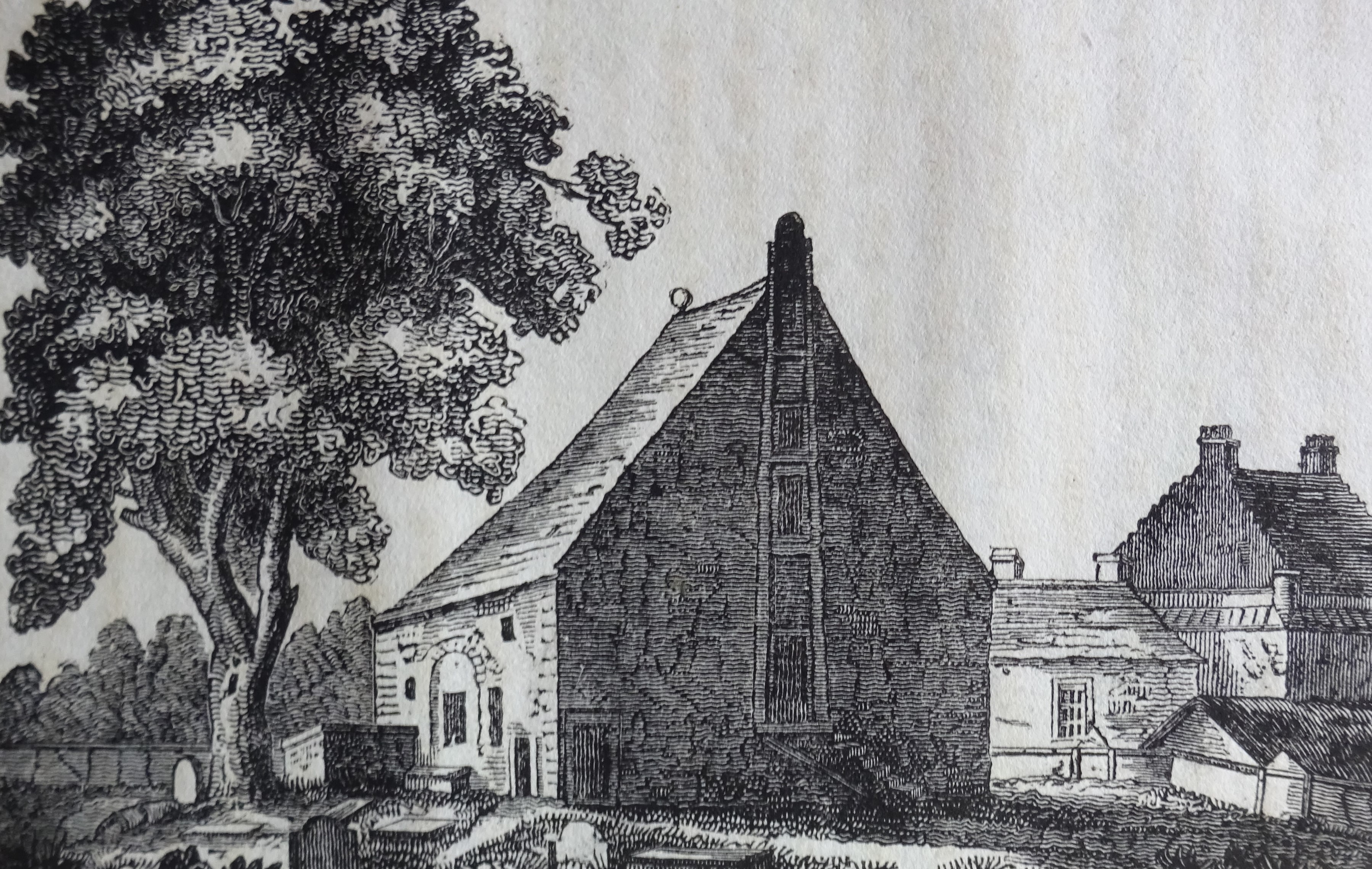
Mauchline Kirk as it appeared at the time of Gavin Hamilton with his house and the tower in the background.

As stated, Gavin was the collector of stent, a form of poor relief, and difficulties over its disbursement led to ill feeling with the Rev. William 'Daddy' Auld and the Kirk Session resulting in a protracted period of religious persecution, such as a formal complaint that he had asked a servant to dig two and a half rows of new potatoes on a Sunday at the divine hour of the church service.

The servant was brought before the session and suffered public rebuke, however he showed his loyalty by giving his son a double 'first' name, Gavin Hamilton Bryan. This was in all likelihood the first time a 'middle' name had been given to a servants child in the parish. William Auld would not have been pleased to baptise a child with these names and duly took his revenge on the servant a few years later.

The fund was £6 short and Gavin explained that not all householders in the parish could afford to contribute to it, however he was suspected of embezzlement by William Auld.

Gavin was found guilty at the kirk session of various religious contraventions and appealed to the Presbytery of Ayr, having engaged Robert Aiken 'Orator Bob' of Ayr. On 25 June 1785 he appeared with the following charges levelled against him:

i. Unnecessary absences from church on two Sabbaths in December and three Sabbaths in January together.

ii. Setting out on a journey to Carrick on the third Sabbath in January.

iii. Habitual, if not total, neglect of family worship.

iv. Writing an abusive letter to the Session dated 13 November 1784.

The Presbytery found in Gavin's favour however the minister and session appealed to the Synod of Glasgow and Ayr only to lose again.

Burns, being another of the 'New Licht' adherents, enthusiastically supported his friend and produced "Holy Willie's Prayer" that lambasted William Fisher, a supporter of 'Daddy Auld'. He wrote a series of poems that criticised the 'Auld Licht', including "The Holy Tulzie" also known as the "Twa Herds".

In the summer of 1787 Burns had visited Mauchline briefly and had found his friend Gavin Hamilton seriously ill however he wrote upon his recovery, hearing that Gavin had surprisingly been in 'Daddy' Auld's company he first advises, in the friendliest of terms, Hamilton to drink moderately and generally to take care of his health and then goes on to say:

"..as I understand you are now in habits of intimacy with that Boanerges of Gospel powers, Father Auld, be earnest with him that he will wrestle in prayer for you, that you may see the vanity of vanities in trusting to, or even practising the carnal moral works of Charity, Humanity, Generosity, & Forgiveness; things that you practised so flagrantly that it was evident you delighted in them; neglecting or perhaps prophanely despising the wholesome doctrine of "Faith without Works", the only anchor of salvation."

== See also ==
- Robert Aiken
- Jean Armour
- Lesley Baillie
- John Ballantine
- Alison Begbie
- Nelly Blair
- Isabella Burns
- May Cameron
- Mary Campbell (Highland Mary)
- Jenny Clow
- Helen Hyslop
- Nelly Kilpatrick
- Jessie Lewars
- John McMurdo
- Anne Rankine
- John Richmond (lawyer)
- James Smith (draper)
- Isabella Steven
- Peggy Thompson
