= John Ballantine (banker) =

Scottish merchant and banker (1743-1812)

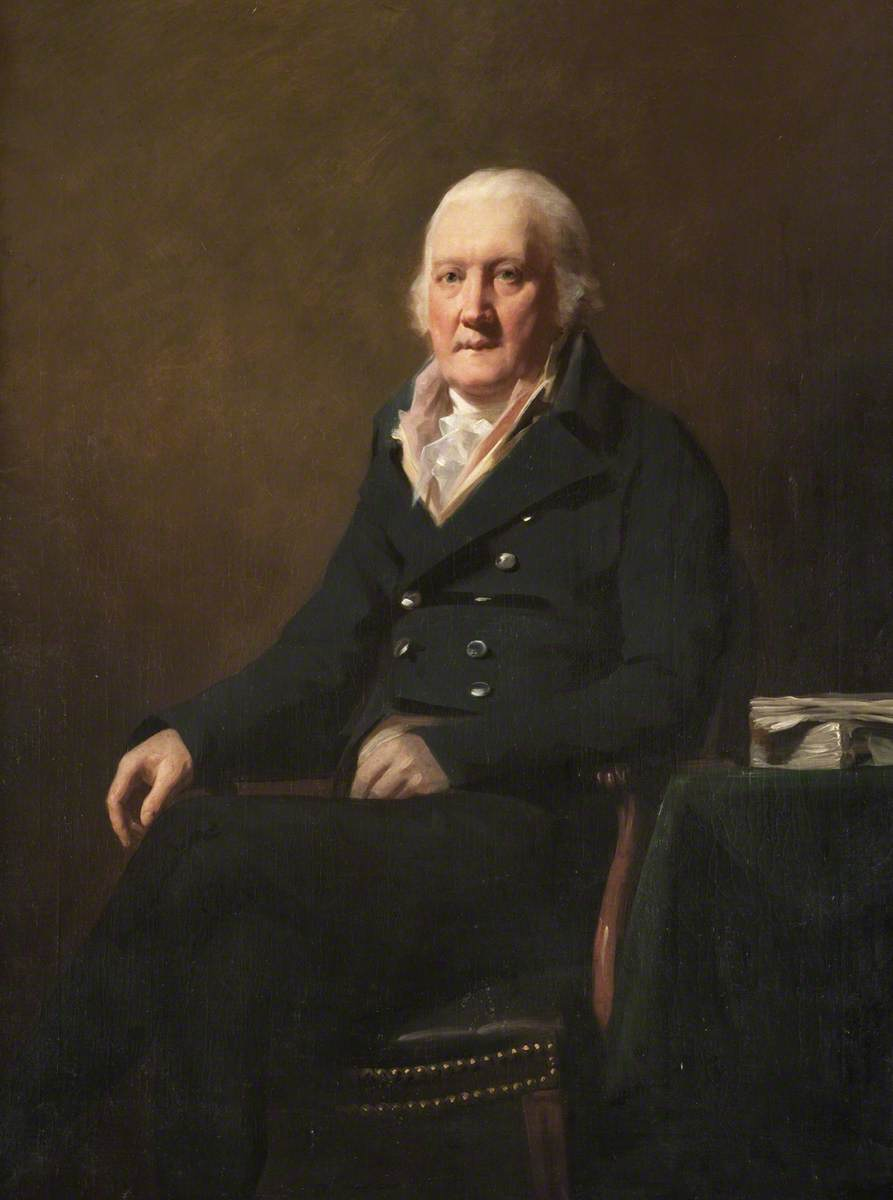
- painting by Henry Raeburn
- Born: 24 July 1743; Ayr
- Died: 15 July 1812; Scotland
- Occupations: Merchant and Banker

John Ballantine (1743–1812), was a Scottish merchant and banker and one of the greatest friends, admirers and closest confidants of Robert Burns. Significantly Ballantine gave the poet advice on the selection of poems for his First Kilmarnock Edition as well as being asked for his opinion on the bard's poems.

== Life and character ==
John was born in Ayr to William Ballantine, a baillie in Ayr and his mother was Elizabeth Bowman. He was a merchant and a Banker and in 1787 he became the Provost of Ayr, during which time he helped establish Ayr Academy. As the Dean of Guild he had served a leading role in the plans to build a new bridge over the River Ayr. He died unmarried aged 68 and is buried at the Auld Kirk in Ayr. He lived at Castlehill House, now demolished, on the Ayr to Dalmellington road. The Castlehill area of Ayr is named for the old house and estate.

== Association with Robert Burns ==
Burns from time to time sent Ballantine drafts of his poetry, however their correspondence tailed off in the poet's final years probably due to his failing health and the heavy pressure on his free time.

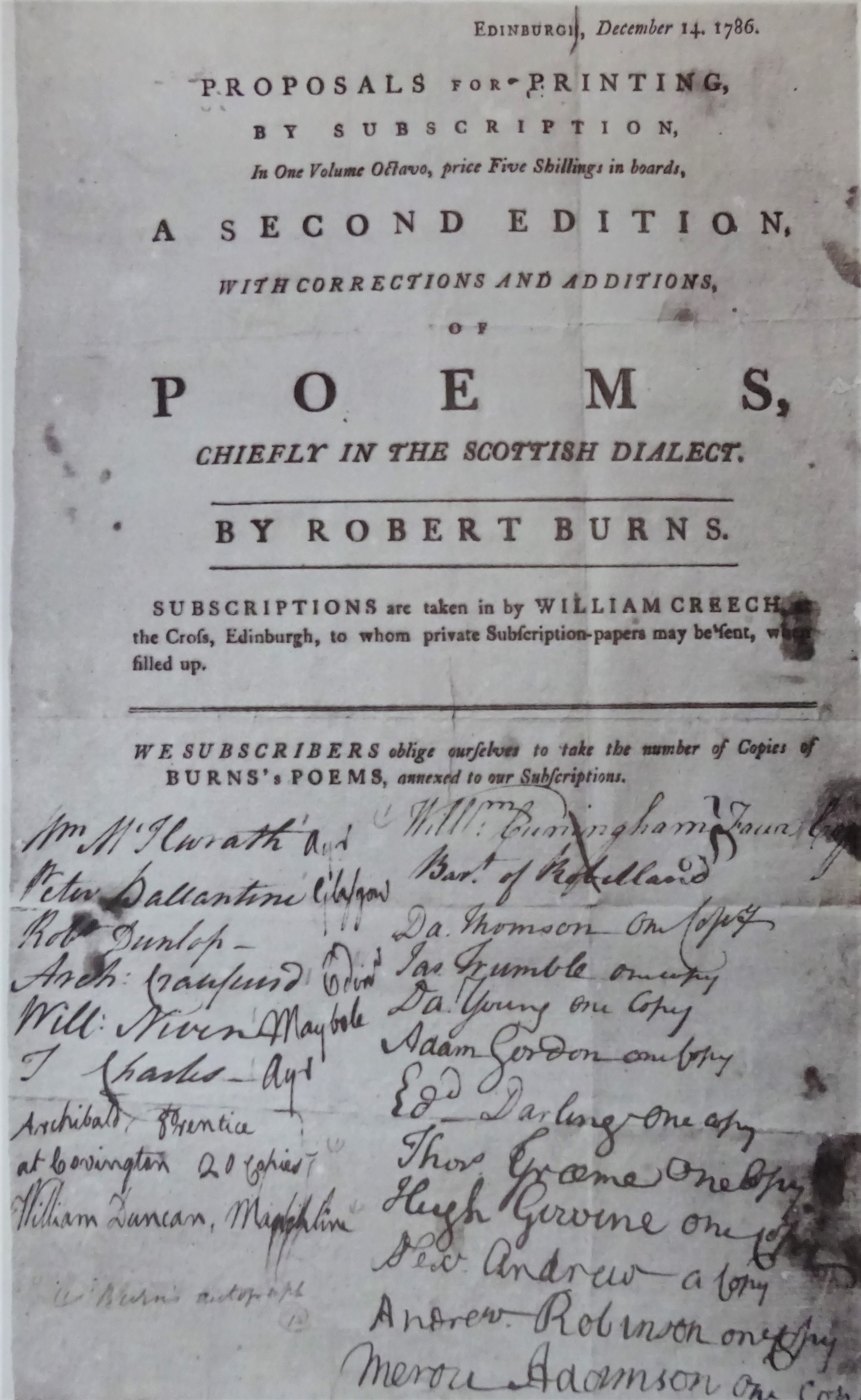
The Advertisement for the First Edinburgh Edition of 1787.

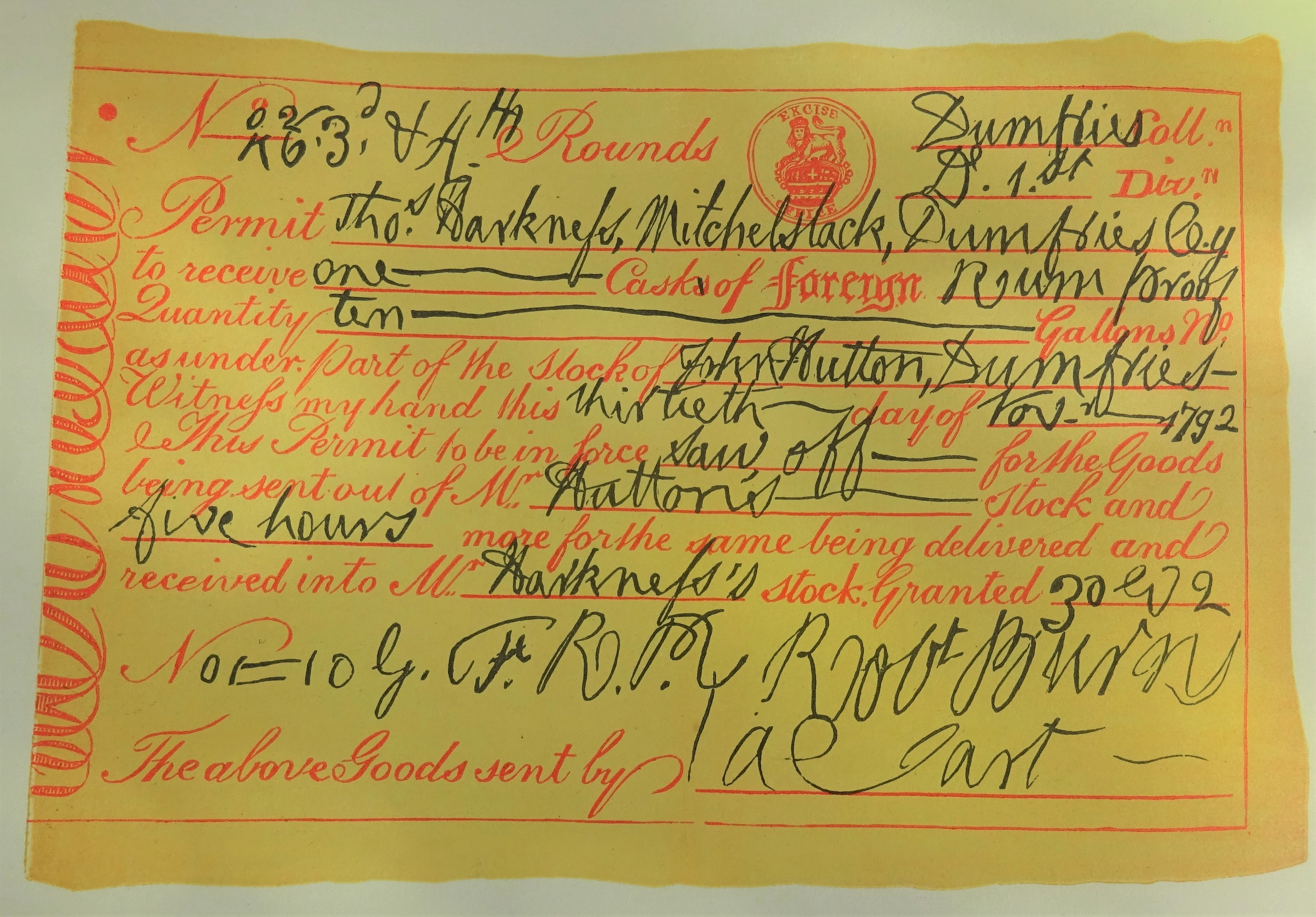
Exercise Permit completed by Robert Burns.

In 1791 Robert Burns expressed his thanks to Ballantine for having assisted in taking him socially "..up to the Court of the Gentiles, in the Temple of Fame", a reference relating to the great Temple in Jerusalem where Gentiles were only admitted entry to the outer court.

Burns dedicated his poem "The Brigs of Ayr" to Ballantine. It had not been composed in time to be included in the 1786 Kilmarnock Edition and with the apparent failure of a second edition Burns wrote to Robert Aiken saying that "There is scarcely any thing hurts me so much in being my disappointment of my second edition, as not having it in my power to show my gratitude to Mr Ballantine .... I would detest myself as a wretch, if I thought I were capable, in a very long life, of forgetting the honest, warm, and tender delicacy with which he enters into my interests."

Either Ballantine or Robert Aiken are likely to have spoken to Dr. Patrick Douglas of Garallan on the poets behalf, as he had property in Jamaica, supervised by his brother Charles, regarding Burns aspirations to take ship and to work on the island.

John Wilson, printer of Burns's First Kilmarnock Edition, demanded money in advance for the printing of a second edition and according to Gilbert Burns, Ballantine offered to lend Burns the necessary funds, however he also advised hm to seek an Edinburgh publisher. Burns did not avail himself of the offer for funding. Ballantine had advised the poet in the selection of works for the 'Kilmarnock Edition'.

Ballantine gave substantial assistance to Burns's publishing efforts and received a package of subscription bills for the First Edinburgh Edition and on 24 February 1787 was told to expect the publication to be in ten days time, however it was not until 18 April 1787 that the volume was finally printed and he was sent one hundred copies of the new book on the very first day of its publication.

Ballantine introduced Robert Burns to James Dalrymple of Orangefield, the key individual to his entry into Edinburgh society, for James was a first cousin of James Cunningham, Earl of Glencairn as well as of Captain James Macrae of Houston, all three being distinguished members of Edinburgh's social life.

Ballantine appears to have been one of the sponsors that lead to Burns joining the Excise service.

In January 1801 Ballantine attended the first Burns Supper along with Robert Aiken and nine other admirers and friends of Burns, dining on sheep head and haggis.

=== Correspondence ===
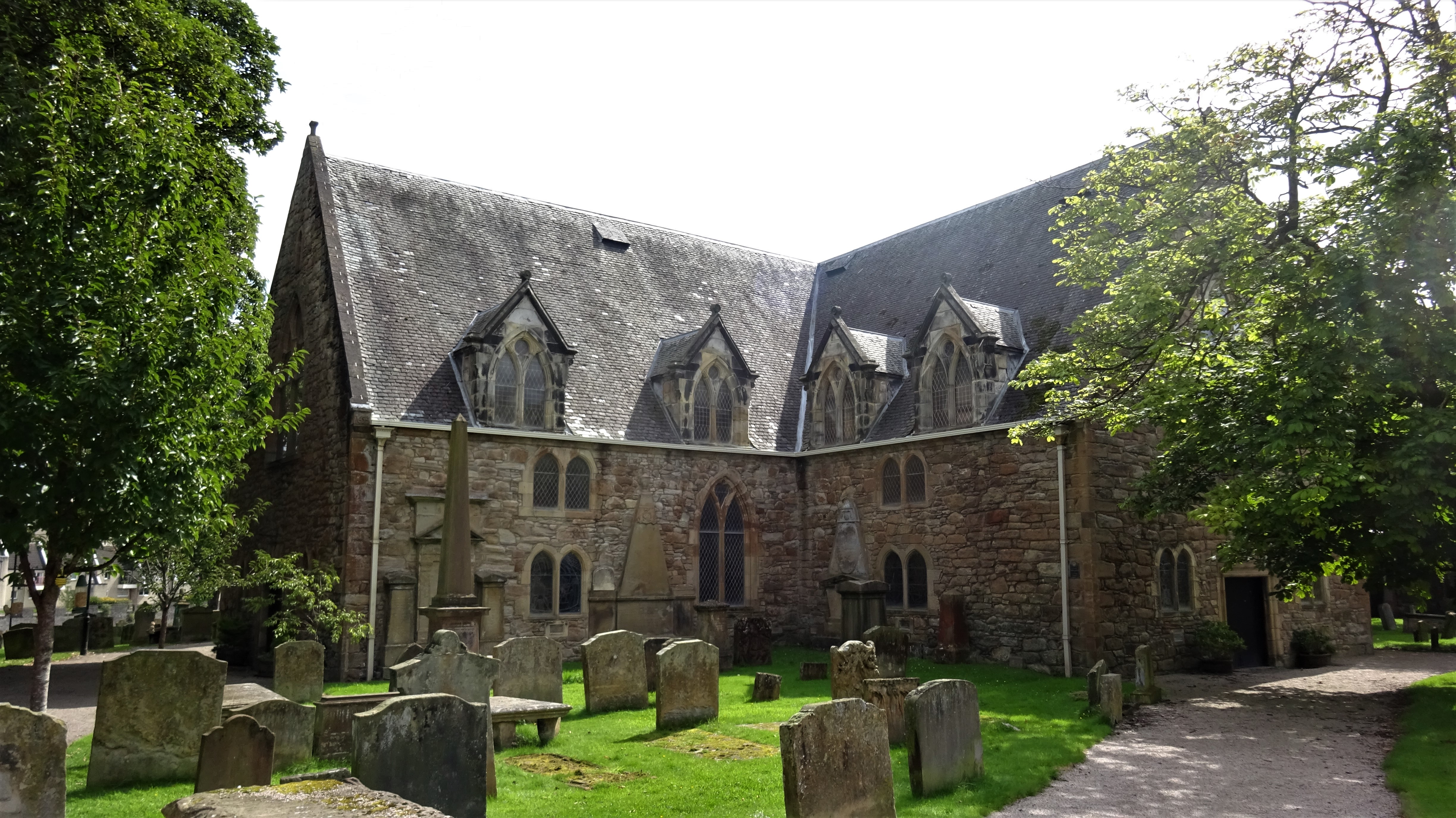
John Ballantine's memorial at St John the Baptist Kirk, Ayr. Large memorial on the church wall next to the largest window.

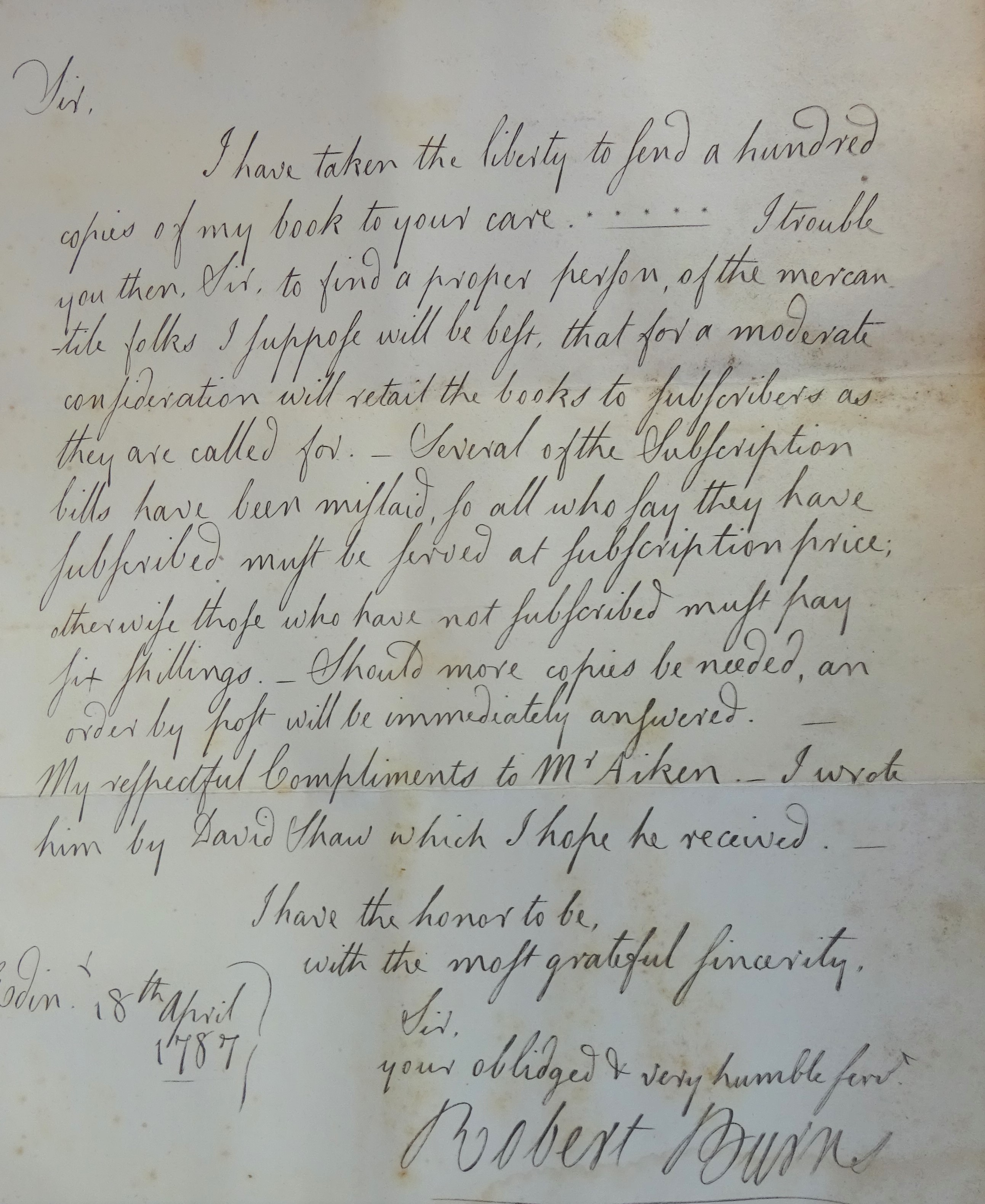
Letter to John Ballantine from Robert Burns regarding 100 copies of the First Edinburgh Edition.

In two letters dated 20 November and 13 December 1783 Burns wrote to Ballantine saying that Robert Aiken was his "first poetic patron" and "first kind of patron."

Circa 8 October 1786 he wrote that he had met with John Wilson, his printer for the Kilmarnock Edition, and had settled all the expenses. On the matter of a second edition he stated that "By his account, the paper of a thousand copies would cost about twenty-seven pounds, and the printing about fifteen or sixteen: he offers to agree to this for the printing, if I will advance for the paper, but this you know is out of my power; so farewell hopes of a second edition till I grow richer! an epocha which, I think, will arrive at the payment of the British national debt."

'A Winter Night' was another poem that Burns sent Ballantine with a request that he hoped for an opinion, saying "Inclosed you have my first attempt in that irregular kind of measure in which many of our finest Odes are wrote. How far I have succeeded, I don't know ..." By 28 November 1786 Burns said that he would be in Ayr and that "I hear of no returns from Edinburgh to Mr Aiken respecting my second edition business, so I am thinking to set out beginning of next week for the city myself. If my first poetic patron, Mr Aiken, is in town, I want to get his advice, both in my procedure and some little criticism affairs, much; if business will permit you to honour me with a few minutes when I come down on Friday."

In 1786 Burns wrote to Ballantine at Ayr saying in regard of 'The Brigs of Ayr' "I have taken the liberty to inscribe the inclosed Poem to you. I am the more at ease about this, as it is not the anxiously served-up address of the Poet wishing to conciliate a liberal Patron, but the honest sincerity of heart-felt Gratitude."

On 13 December 1786 Ballantine received a letter telling him that "I am nearly agreed with Creech to print my book." Burns had sent a copy of Death and Dr Hornbook to Ballantine together with the aforementioned subscription bills. Surprisingly he intended it only for Ballantine's amusement as he thought it "too trifling and prolix to publish."

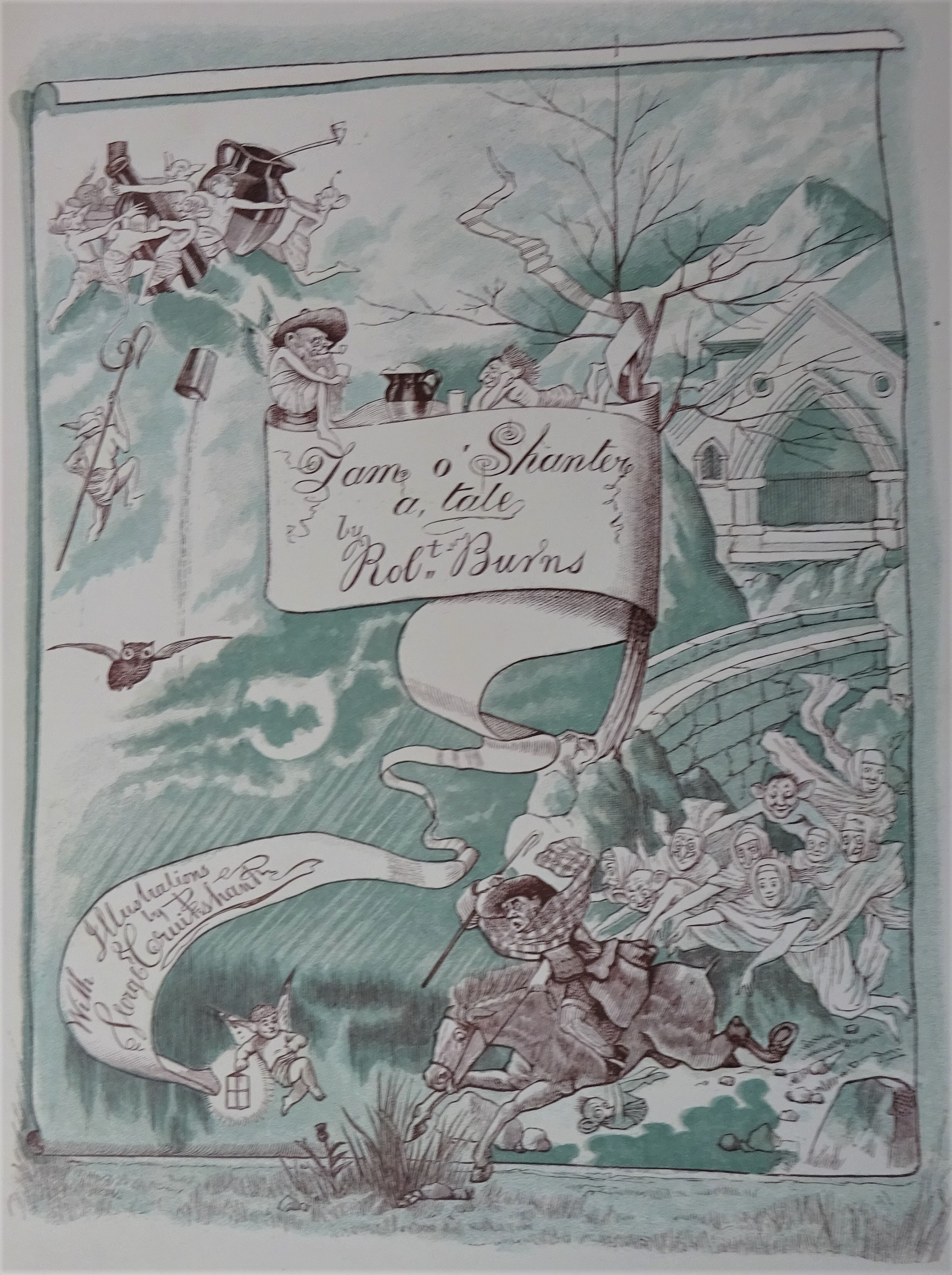
Tam o' Shanter. John Ballantine was sent a copy of this poem by Burns.

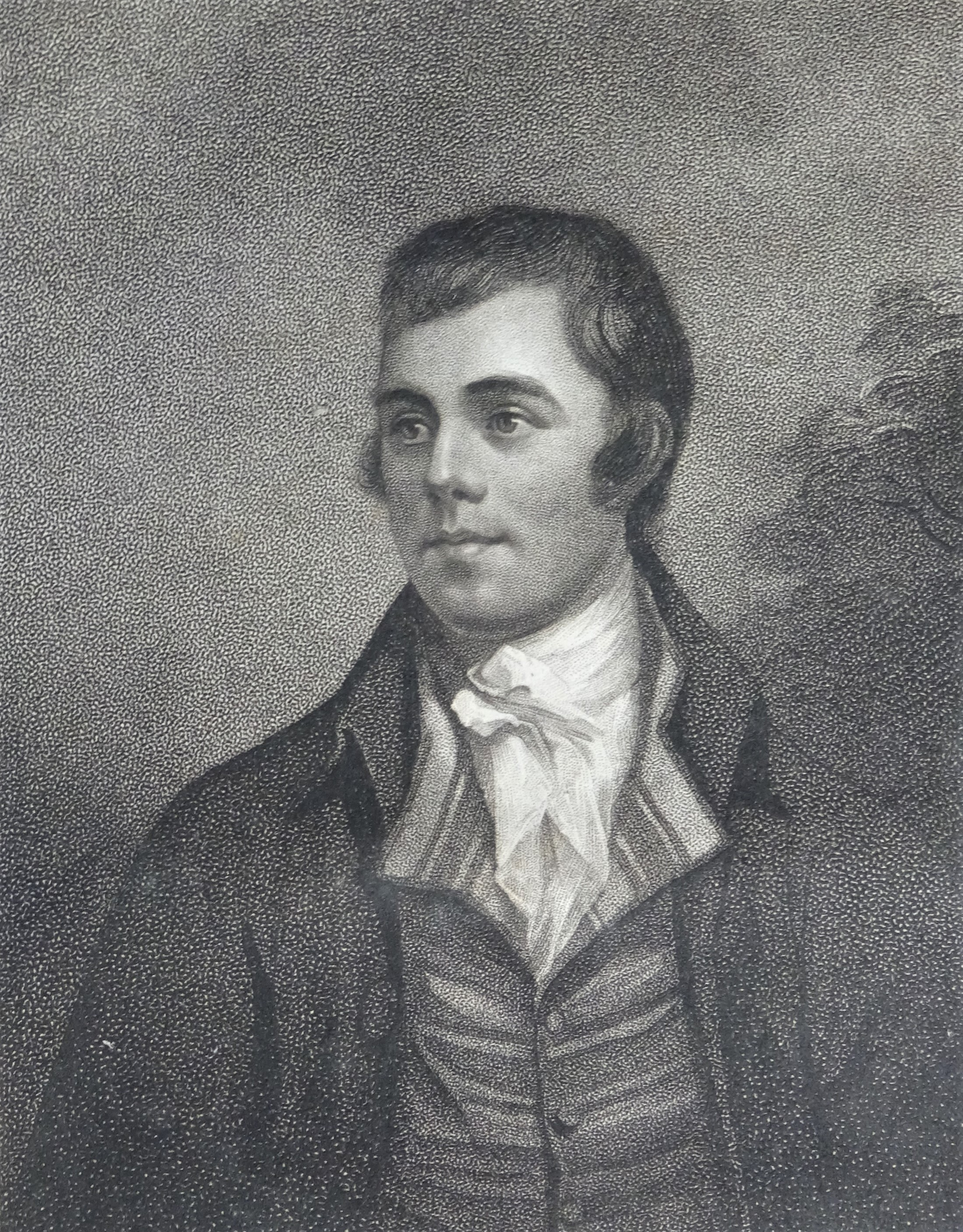
Robert Burns after Alexander Nasmyth engraved by W.T.Fry from James Currie's 8th edition of 'The Life of Robert Burns'.

Writing to Ballantine on 13 December 1786 Burns stated that "I have been introduced to a good many of the noblesse, but my avowed Patrons and Patronesses are the Duchess of Gordon, the Countess of Glencairn, with my lord and lady Betty, the Dean of Faculty, Sir John Whitefoord. I have likewise warm friends among the Literati, Professors Stewart, Blair, Greenfield, and Mr McKenzie the Man of feeling. An unknown hand left ten guineas for the Ayrshire Bard in Mr Sibbald's hand, which I got. I have since discovered my generous unknown friend tobe Patrick Miller Esq. brother to the Justice Clerk ... I was, Sir, when I was first honoured with your notice, too obscure, now I tremble lest I should be ruined by being dragged to [sic] suddenly into the glare of polite & learned observation."

In the same letter Burns wrote that "Dugald Stewart and some of my learned friends put me in the periodical paper called 'The Lounger', a copy of which I here inclose you."

Burns described his Edinburgh landlady to Ballantine, writing that "I have just now had a visit from my Landlady who is a staid, sober, piously disposed, sculdudery-abhoring Widow, coming on her grand climaterick. She is at present in sore tribulation respecting some "Daughters of Belial" who are on the floor immediately above ... as our floors are low and ill-plaistered, we can easily distinguish our laughter-loving, night-rejoicing neighbours - when they are eating, when they are drinking, when they are singing, when they are etc., my worthy Landlady tosses sleepless & unquiet, 'looking for rest but finding none' the whole night." "

On 14 January 1787 he reported to Ballantine that he had corrected the hundred and fifty-second page of the First Edinburgh Edition of his poems, however it was not until 22 March 1787 that the proof correcting was finally complete.

On 14 January 1787 Ballantine received a letter from Burns indicating that he was considering a return to farming with the likelihood of leasing a farm on the lands of Dalswinton in Nithsdale, an estate owned by Patrick Miller, saying "My generous friend, Mr Peter (Patrick) Miller, brother to the Justice Clerk, has been talking to me about a lease of some farm or other in an estate called Dalswinton which he has lately bought near Dumfries." Burns also stated the "Some life-rented, embittering Recollections whisper me that I will be happier elsewhere than in my old neighbourhood, but Mr. Miller is no Judge of land and though I dare say he means to favour me, yet he may give me, in his opinion, an advantageous bargain that may ruin me. I am to take a tour by Dumfries as I return and have promised to meet Mr Miller on his lands some time in May."

Burns wrote on 24 February 1787 that "I am getting my phiz done by an eminent engraver, and if it can be ready in time, I will appear in my book, looking like all other fools, to my title-page." He also commented that "I am oblidged, against my own wish, to print subscribers' names; so if any of my Ayr friends have subscription bills, they must be sent in to Creech directly."

Burns wrote to Ballantine during the time that he was incapacitated by a knee injury "... owing to a fall by the drunken stupidity of a coachman" requesting that his friend send some of the proceeds from the sale of his book to Gilbert Burns "Should he want half a dozen pounds or more " who was struggling to make a success of farming at his Mossgiel Farm located near Mauchline.

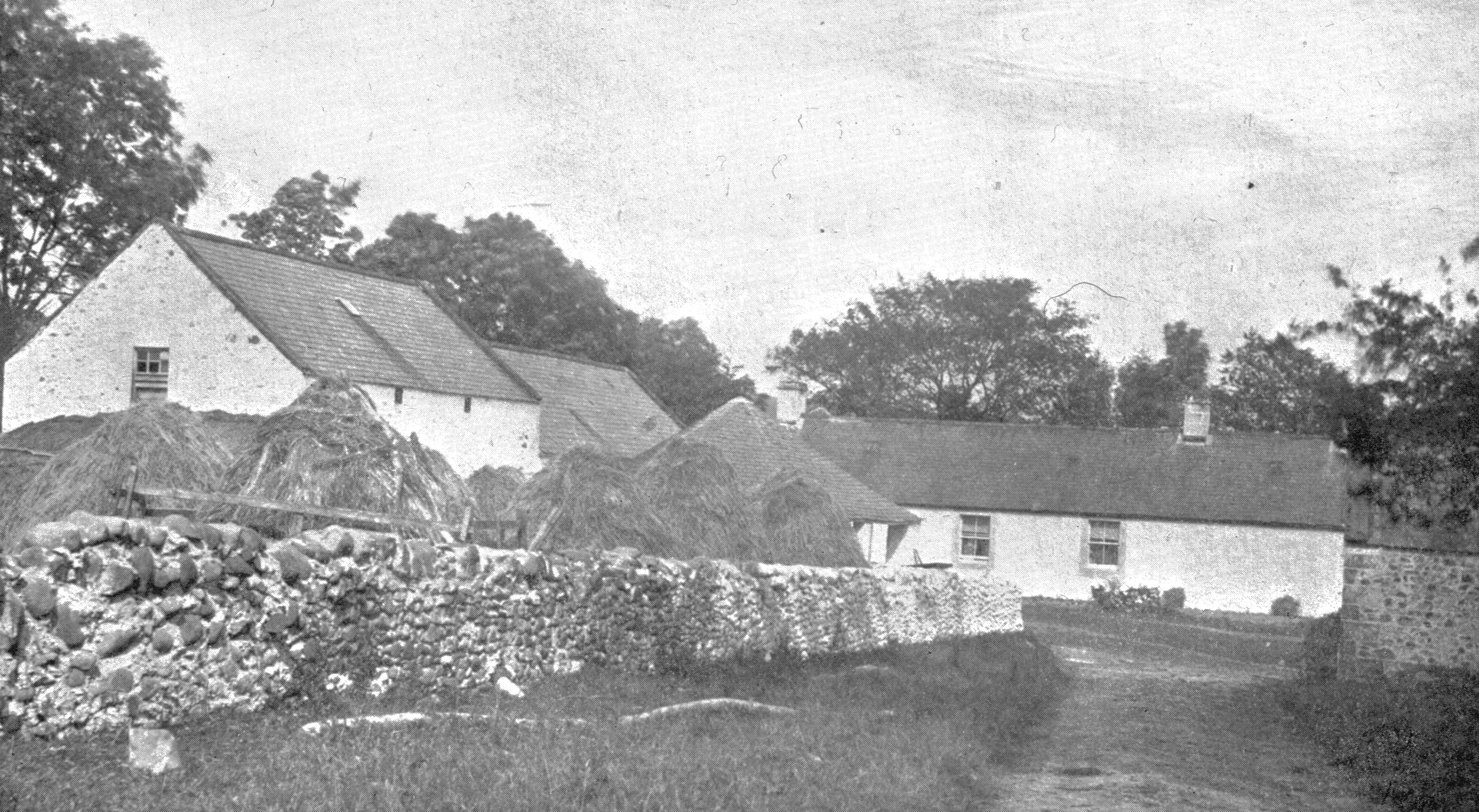
Ellisland Farm c. 1900

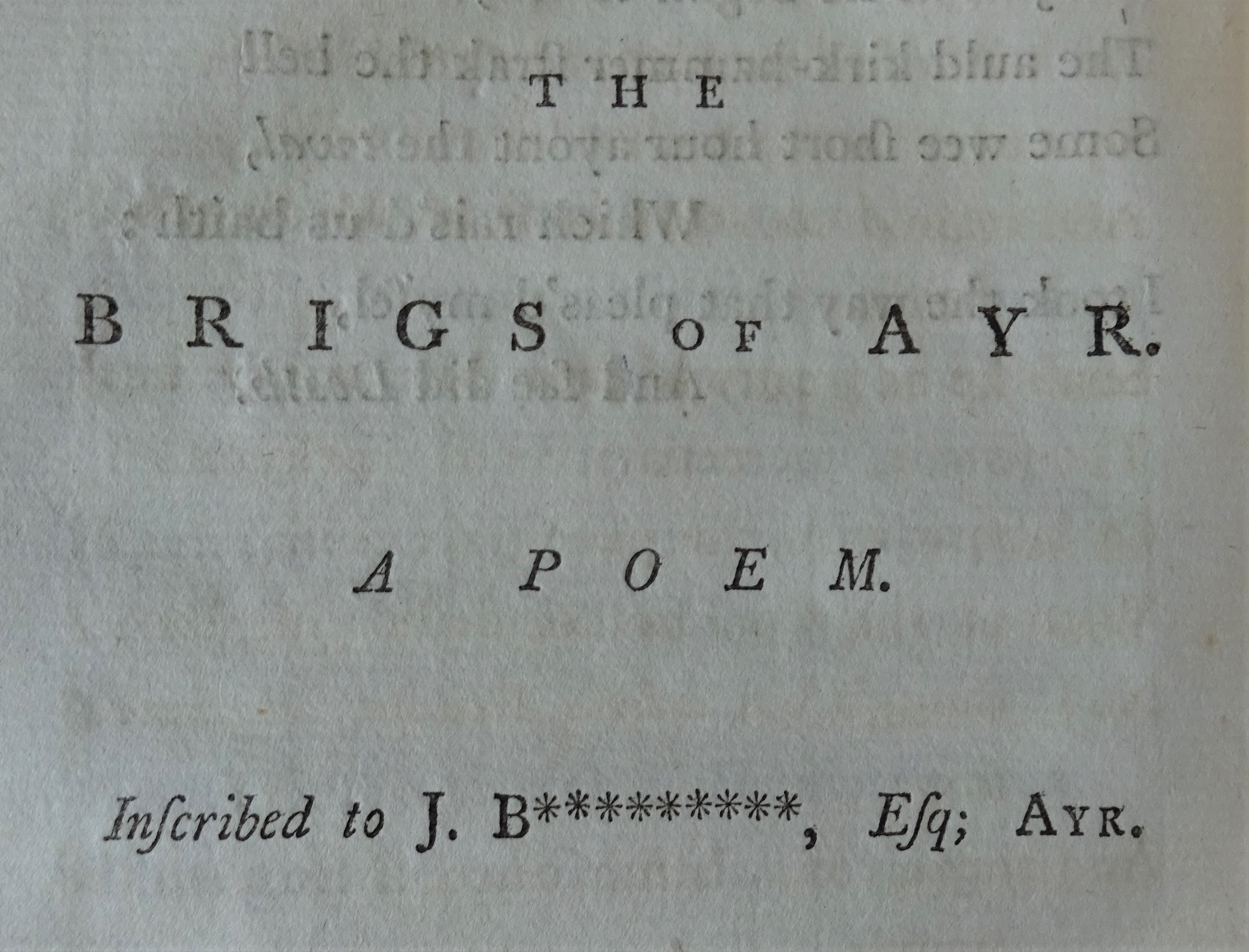
Dedication to John Ballantine of the 'Brigs of Ayr'.

On 27 September 1787 Burns sent Ballantine a copy of his poem "The Brigs of Ayr".

Circa August 1788 a copy by an amanuensis was sent to Ballantine of "The Fete Champetre". Burns complained of a bruised thumb having prevented him from writing.

In March 1791 Burns wrote that "While here I sit, sad & solitary, by the side of a fire in a little country inn, & drying my wet clothes, in pops a poor fellow of a sodger & tells me is going to Ayr --- By Heaven's! say I to myself with a tide of good spirits which the magic of that sound, Auld Ayr toon o' Ayr, conjured up, I will send my last song to Mr Ballantine. --- Here it is --- 'Ye flowery banks o'bonie Doon.' "

"Ye flowery banks o' bonie Doon,
How can ye blume sae fair?
How can ye chant, ye little birds,
And I see fu' o. care?"

Thou'll break my heart, thou bonie bird,
That sings upon the bough;
Thou minds me o' the happy days,
When my fause love was true."

In September 1791 Burns wrote that "Lord Buchan lately sent me an invitation to make one at the Coronation of a bust of Thomson, which is placed on Ednam-hill, the place where the poet was born. I excused myself to his Lordship as they have fixed the middle of harvest for the business, but I sent him the following stanzas, as an address to the Shade of the Bard ..." Burns had been commissioned to write Address, to the Shade of Thomson. On Crowning his Bust at Ednam, Roxburgh-shire with a Wreath of Bays."

On 16 October 1791 Burns wrote his last known letter to Ballantine from the Globe Inn at Dumfries, enclosing his latest work, probably "Tam o' Shanter."

== See also ==
- Robert Aiken
- Jean Armour
- Lesley Baillie
- Alison Begbie
- Nelly Blair
- Isabella Burns
- May Cameron
- Mary Campbell (Highland Mary)
- Jenny Clow
- Gavin Hamilton (lawyer)
- Helen Hyslop
- Nelly Kilpatrick
- Jessie Lewars
- Anne Rankine
- John Richmond (lawyer)
- Isabella Steven
- Peggy Thompson
- James Smith (draper)
- John Murdoch (teacher)
