= John McMurdo =

Chamberlain to the Duke of Queensberry (1743–1803)

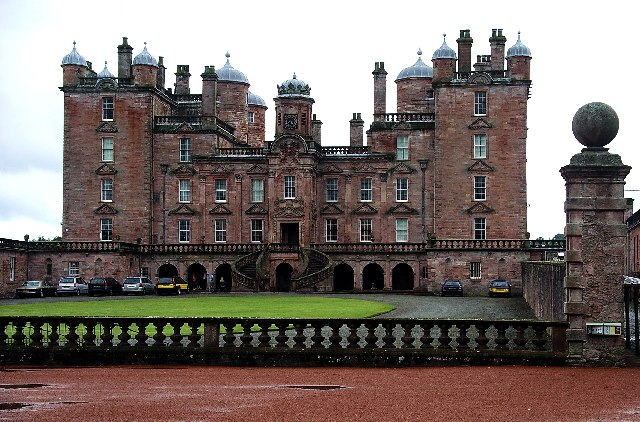
- Drumlanrig Castle
- Born: 3 June 1743; Drumlanrig, Scotland
- Died: 4 December 1803 (aged 60); Bath, England
- Occupation: Chamberlain to the Duke of Queensberry

John McMurdo (1743–1803) was a friend of Robert Burns who became the chamberlain to the Duke of Queensberry at Drumlanrig Castle where the poet was a frequent visitor. His eldest daughter Jean (1777-1839) was also a close friend of Burns, who wrote the song "Bonie Jean" in her honour. As an old Nithsdale family the McMurdos were related to the Sharpes of Hoddam, the Charteris of Amisfield, the Fergussons of Craigdarroch, Dr James Currie and the Duncans of Torthorwald amongst others.

== Life and character ==
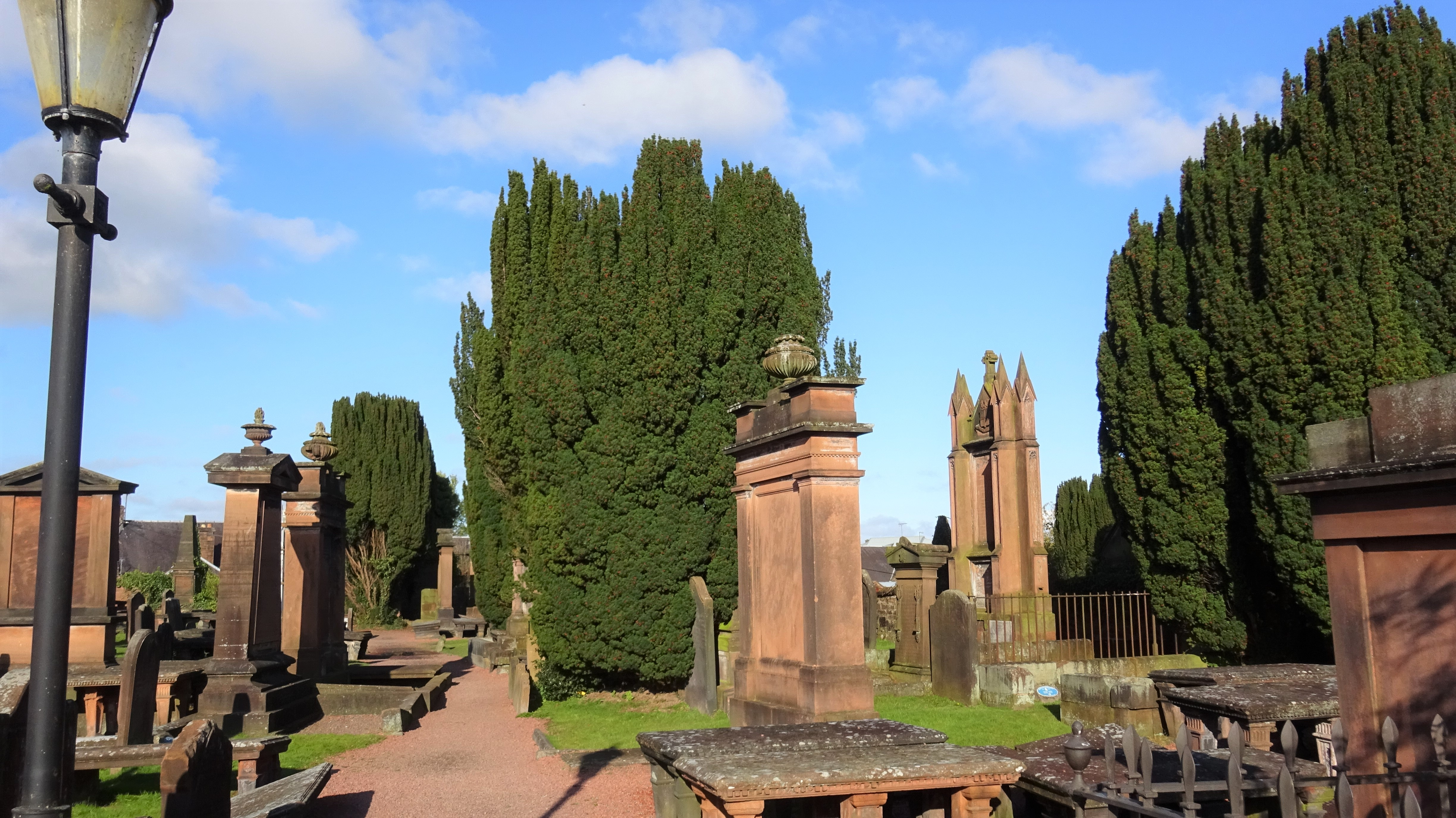
St Michael's Kirkyard, Dumfries

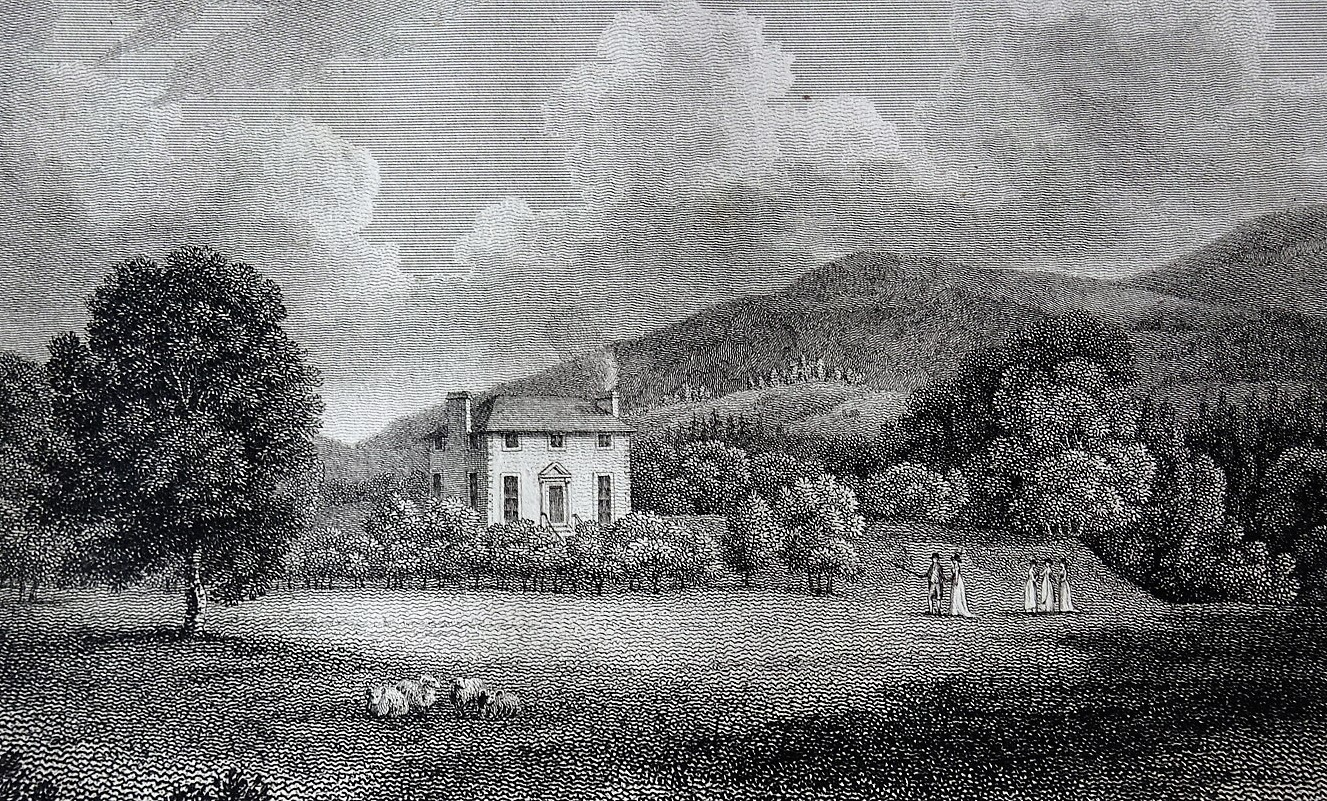
Friars' Carse, the home of Robert Riddell.

His father was Robert McMurdo of Drungans and his mother was Philadelphia Douglas. His father was the chamberlain to 'Old Q', the 4th Duke of Queensberry, William Douglas at Drumlanrig Castle to whom he was related as a distant cousin and John, although qualified as a lawyer, succeeded him in 1780, retiring in 1797. He married Jane Blair (1749-1836), daughter of David Blair, daughter of the Provost of Dumfries and the couple had seven sons and seven daughters. Jane died on the 19 April 1836 and is buried in St Michael's Kirkyard in Dumfries. John McMurdo died at Bath in 1803.

In 1793 he had a town house built in Dumfries and he also purchased an estate near Annan called Hardriggs as an investment.

McMurdo's daughter Arenta was named in honour of the major commandant of the Royal Dumfries Volunteers, Colonel Arent Schuyler De Peyster. Burns and McMurdo were members of the Volunteers.

== Association with Robert Burns ==
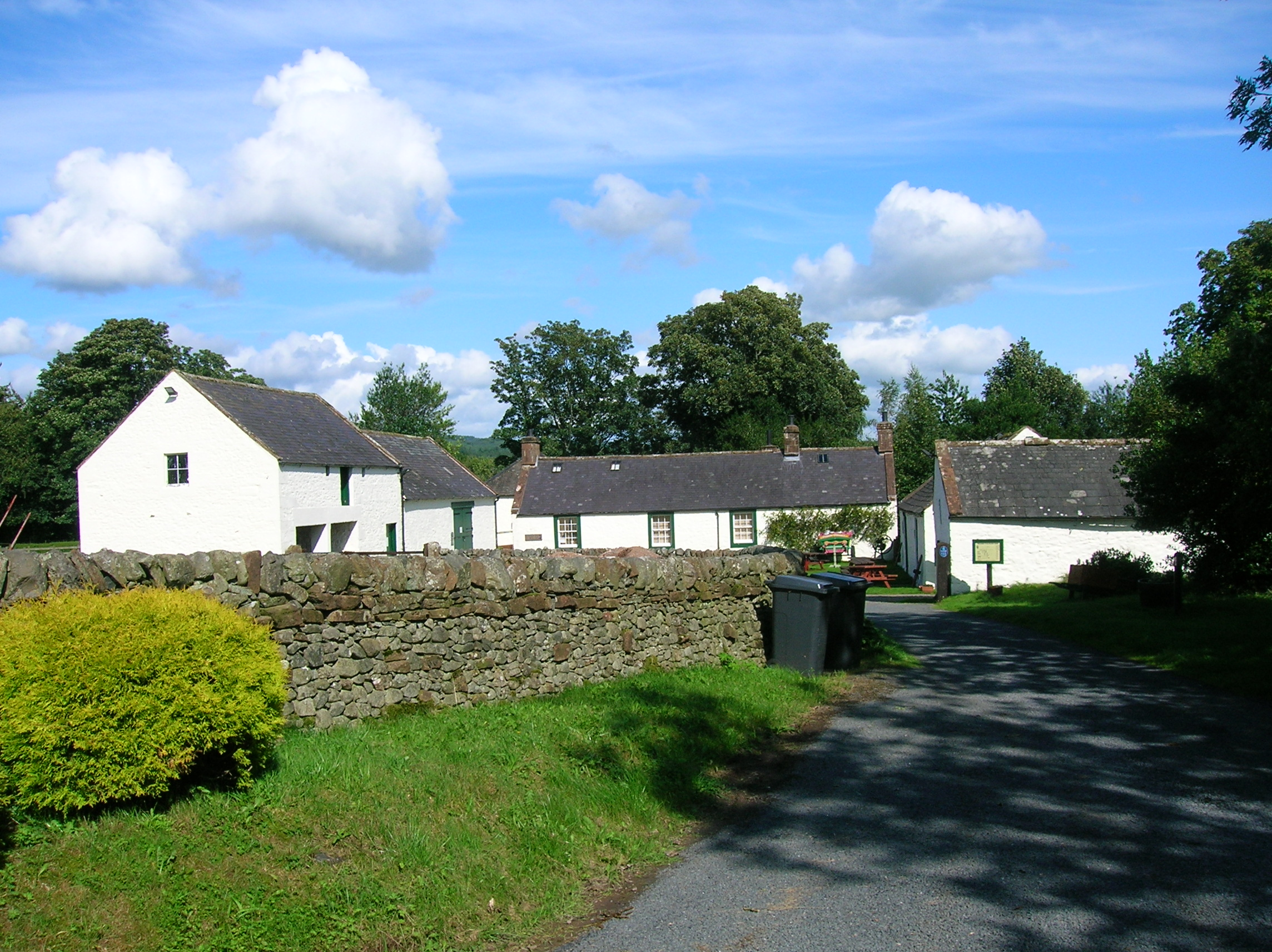
Ellisland Farm

Burns was introduced to McMurdo by Robert Riddell of Glenriddel in the summer of 1788 when he was moving into Ellisland Farm and became a frequent visitor to the McMurdo family who were living in Drumlanrig Castle itself.

Burns wrote a poem in tribute to McMurdo and engraved the verses onto a window pane at McMurdo's accommodation in the castle:

On Mr McMurdo

Blest be McMurdo to his latest day!
No envious cloud o'ercast his evening ray;
No wrinkle furrow'd by the hand of care,
Nor ever sorrow add one silver hair!
O may no son the father's honour stain,
Nor ever daughter give the mother pain.

Steven Clarke, musical editor of "The Scots Musical Museum" was persuaded by Burns to travel down from Edinburgh to teach Jean and Philadelphia Barbara McMurdo to sing and play the piano. Clarke transcribed the tune "There was a lass and she was fair" and taught the sisters the words to an old song that Jean Armour Burns sang and in April 1793 Burns sent it to George Thomson for publication with a letter detailing its history. Thomson declined to publish it, Burns later sent a copy to Jean McMurdo together with a letter.

Philadelphia was a noted beauty, known to her friends as Phillis and an inspiration to Burns who wrote several songs in her honour, such as "Adown Wandering Nith", "Phillis the Fair" and "Philly and Willie."

Adown winding Nith I did wander,
Of Phillis to muse and sing.

Burns bawdy verse was enjoyed by McMurdo and in 1793 he lent him the only manuscript copy of the "Merry Muses".

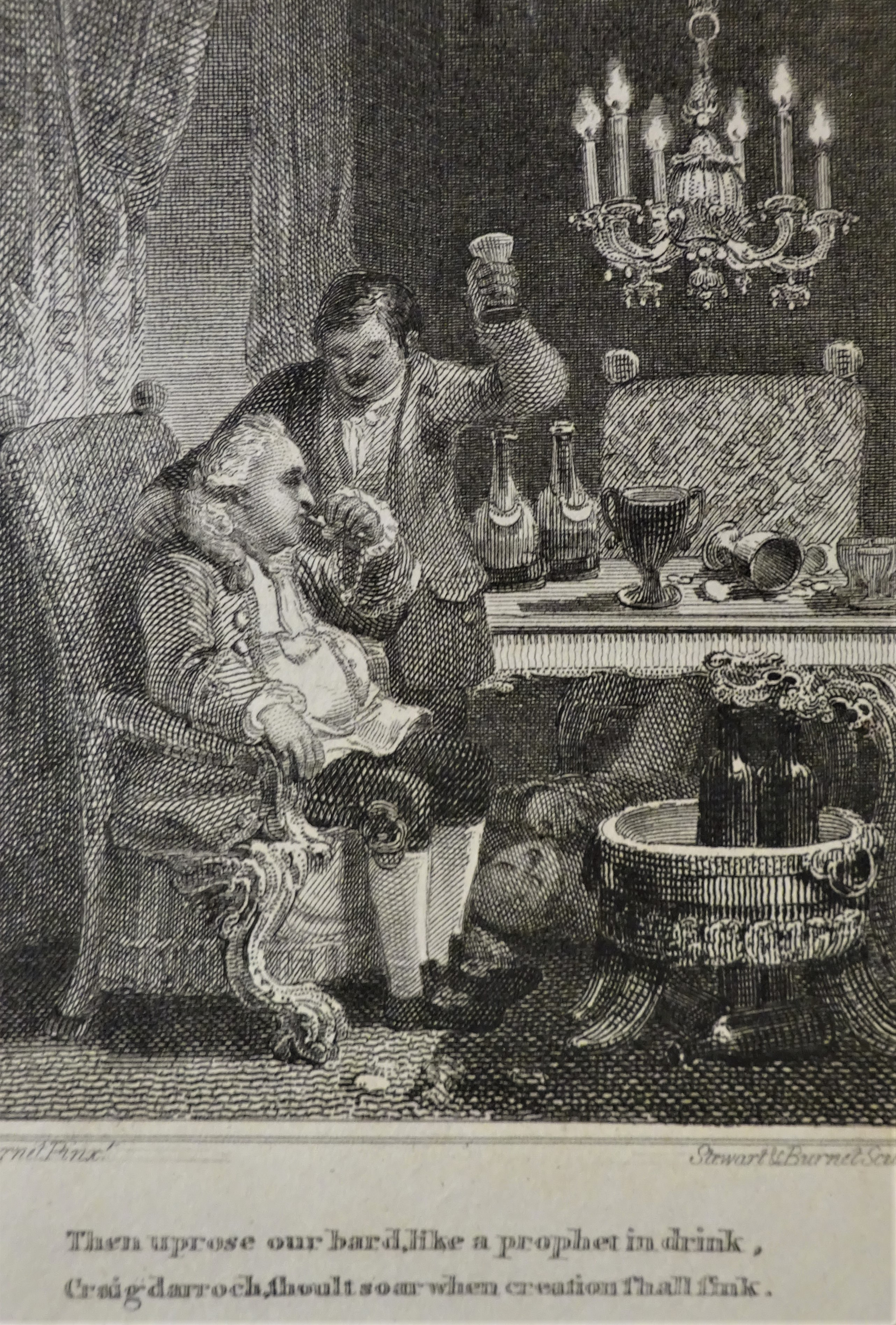
The competition for 'The Whistle'.

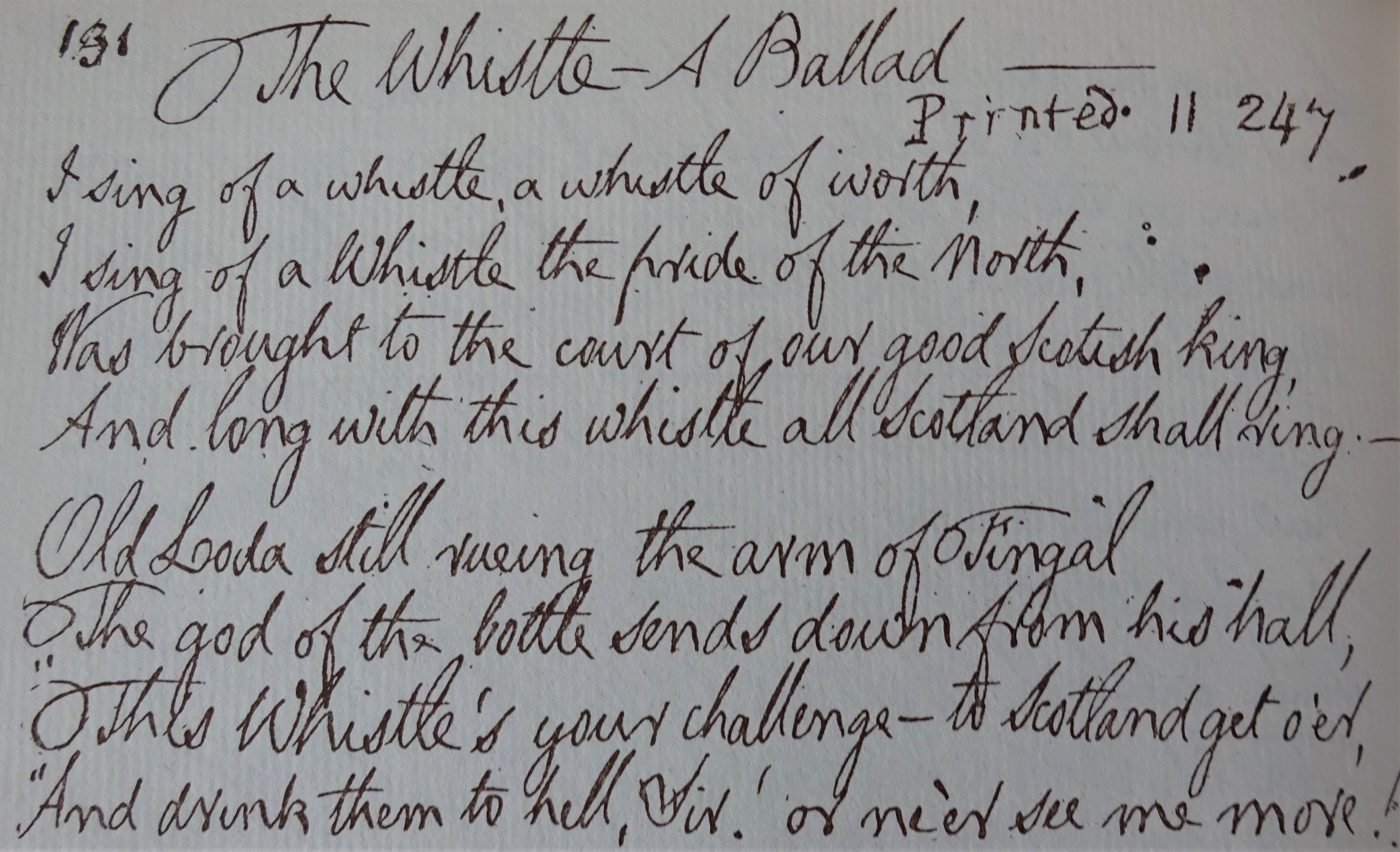
The Whistle - A Ballad.

At the Whistle competition held at Friars Carse McMurdo was appointed as the judge. Burns was persuaded to dine with the Duke of Queensberry, despite his great dislike of him and afterwards sent him a copy of "The Whistle".

In 1793 Burns sent McMurdo a complimentary copy of Thomson's "Select Collection" which contained several new songs by Burns, such as "Wandering Willie" and "The Sodger's Return."

McMurdo introduced Burns to Colonel De Peyster who was the major commandant of the Dumfries Volunteers of which Burns was a member. De Peyster purchased Mavis Grove near Dumfries where the poet was a frequent visitor. McMurdo had married De Peyster's wife's sister and towards the end of his life he purchased Mavis Grove and relatives still lived there in the 1860s.

Burns wrote several songs for the McMurdo family, such as "To the Woodlark" which he wrote at Jane McMurdo's behest. He wrote "Bonie Jean" for one of McMurdo's daughters and wrote requesting permission to present it to his daughter, with the prescient comment "I assure you, I am not a little flattered with the idea, when I anticipate children pointing out in future Publications the tributes of respect I have bestowed upon their mothers". This song is often mistakenly ascribed to Jean Armour, Burns's 'Bonnie Jean'.

During Burns's efforts to clear the name of the teacher James Clarke of accusations of cruelty to his pupils, McMurdo's help was enlisted and eventually Clarke was shown to be innocent of the charges laid against him.

In 1794 McMurdo became the Provost of Dumfries and Burns had mentioned the couple in his "Election Ballad" of 1790:

McMurdo and his lovely spouse
(Th'enamour'd laurels kiss her brows!)
Led on the Loves and Graces:
She won each gaping burgess' heart,
While he, sub rosa, played his part
Among their wives and lasses.

He remained a good friend of Burns until his death and acted as a trustee of the funds raised to assist Jean Armour and her family. Syme, Maxwell and McMurdo had already met the day before Burns's death to discuss raising funds for the Jean and the family.

== Correspondence ==
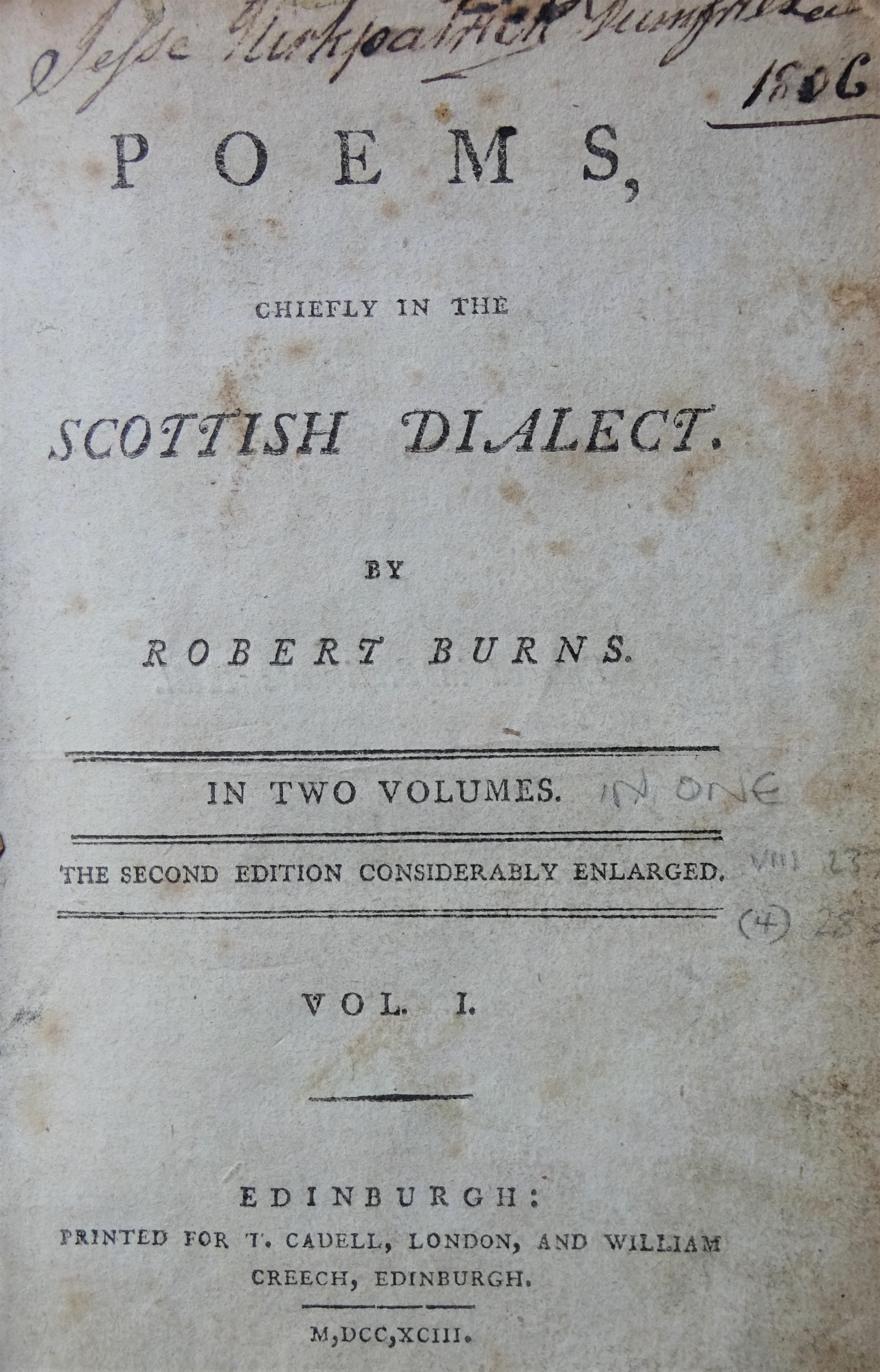
The 1793 edition of 'Poems, Chiefly in the Scottish Dialect

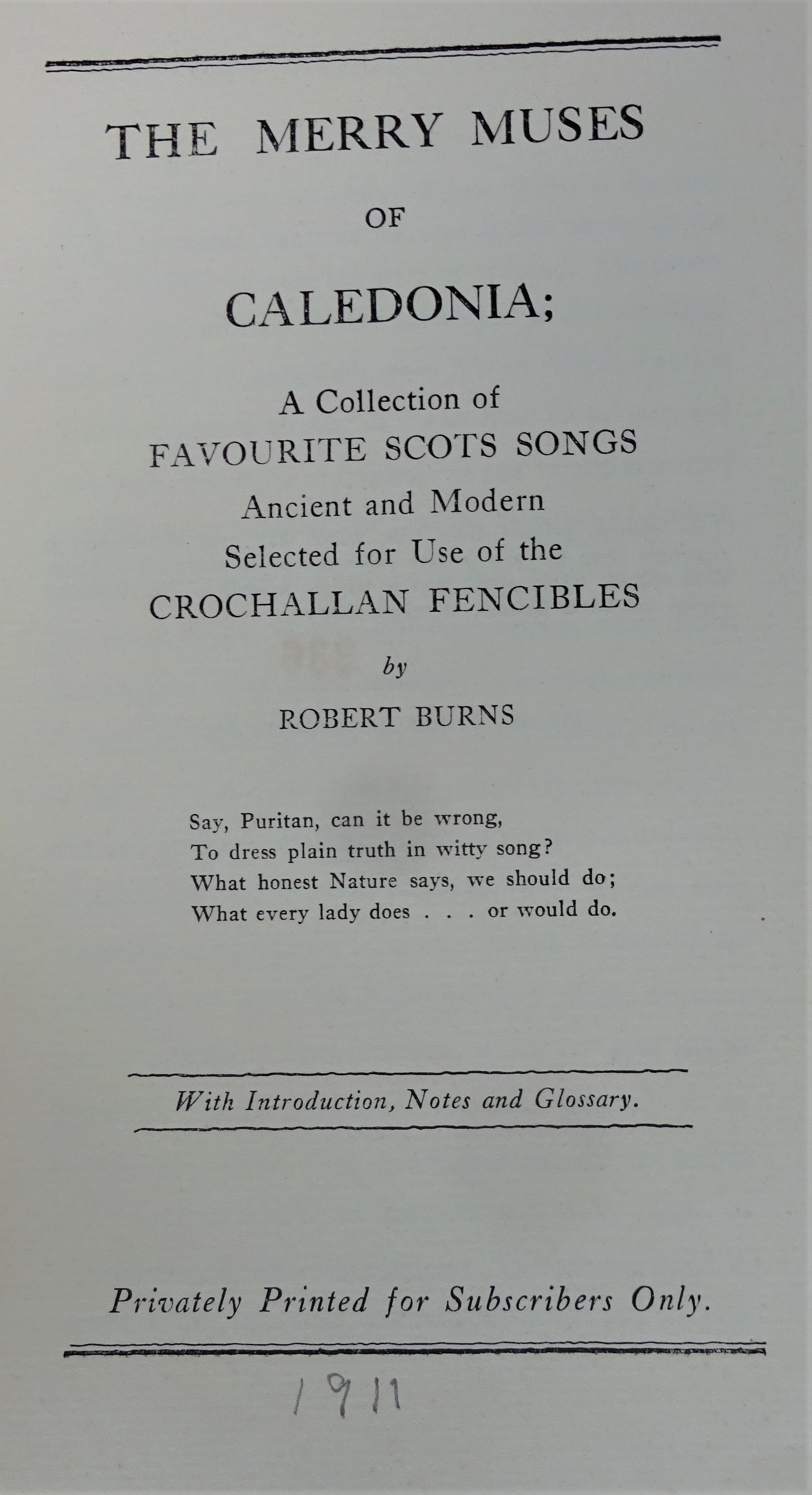
The Merry Muses of Caledonia

On 26 November 1788 Burns wrote that "I have Philosophy or Pride enough, to support with unwounded indifference against the neglect of my mere dull Superiors, the merely rank and file of Noblesse and Gentry, nay even to keep my vanity quite sober under the larding of their Compliments; but from those who are equally distinguished by their Rank and Character, those who bear the true elegant impressions of the Great Creator, on the richest materials, their little notices and attentions are to me among the first of earthly enjoyments."

On 9 January, 1789 Burns wrote saying that "A Poet & a beggar are in so many points of view alike, that one might take them for the same individual character under different designations, were it not though, with a very trifling Poetic licence most Poets may be styled beggars, yet the converse of the propositios does not hold, that evry Beggar is a Poet."

After an embarrassing incident Burns sent letters of apology to those involved, including to McMurdo saying "I believe last night that my old enemy, the Devil, taking the advantage of my being in drink (he well knows he has no chance with me in my sober hours) tempted me to be a little turbulent. You have too much humanity to heed the manic ravings of a poor wretch with the power of Hell, & the potency of port, beset at the same time. In the meantime, allow me to present you with the following Song which I have hammered out this morning." The enclosed song was "Wandering Willie" "Lang Here Awa, There Awa Wandering Willie." Burns was forgiven and their friendship continued.

February 1792 Letter from Burns to McMurdo at Drumlanrig

In around July I793 Burns wrote saying "Kings give Coronets; Alas, I can only bestow a Ballad. Still however I proudly claim one superiority even over Monarchs: My presents, so far as I am a Poet, are the presents of Genius; and as the gifts of R. BURNS, they are the gifts of respectful gratitude to the WORTHY. I assure you, I am not a little flattered with the idea, when I anticipate children pointing out in future Publications the tribute of respect I have bestowed on their Mothers. The merits of the Scots airs, to which many of my Songs are, and more will be, set, give me this pleasing hope."

McMurdo was of those associates that Burns sent a copy of the two volume 1793 Edition of his Poems, Chiefly in the Scottish Dialect (Second Edinburgh Edition), remarking in a note that "However inferior now, or afterwards, I may rank as a Poet; one honest virtue, to which few Poets can pretend, I trust I shall ever claim as mine: to no man, whatever his station in life, or his power to serve me, have 1 ever paid a compliment at the expence of TRUTH."

Upon repaying a loan in December 1793 of six Guineas and lending McMurdo the sole manuscript copy of the "Merry Muses" Burns wrote in a covering letter that "I think I once mentioned something of a collection of Scots songs I have for some years been making: I send you a perusal of what I have got together. I could not conveniently spare them above five or six days, and five or six glances of them will probably more than suffice you. When you are tired of them, please leave them with Mr Clint, of the King's Arms. There is not another copy of the Collection in the world, and I should be very sorry that any unfortunate negligence should deprive me of what has cost me a good deal of pains." Famously in 1800 James Currie added the line "A very few of them [the poems] are my own."
