= Isabella Steven =

Acquaintance of Robert Burns

- Born: Scotland
- Died: Scotland
- Occupation: Housewife

Isabella Steven or Tibbie Stein was the daughter of a tenant farmer from Littlehill or Little Hill Farm (NS467305) that adjoined the Burns's farm at Lochlea. 'Stein' is an alternative form of the surname 'Steven'. Littlehill had three acres of land that are said to have been little better than peat moss. She is also said to have lived in Tarbolton.

== Life and character ==
Isabella or Tibbie was regarded as having been very good looking and at the age of seventeen Robert Burns was greatly attracted to her. The poet "deemed himself doing well in his courtship" until 'Tibbie' came into a legacy and dowry of £75 at which point she decided herself above a mere farmer's son. She married a more prosperous suitor soon after.

Aged nine or ten at the time of these events, Isobel Burns, sister of the poet, is the only source of Isabella Stevens identification as being the 'Tibbie' of the song. A Tarbolton tradition holds that 'Tibbie' lived in the village on the west side of Burns Street on the corner of Garden Street. Her father is said to have been a wealthy farmer.

=== Association with Robert Burns ===
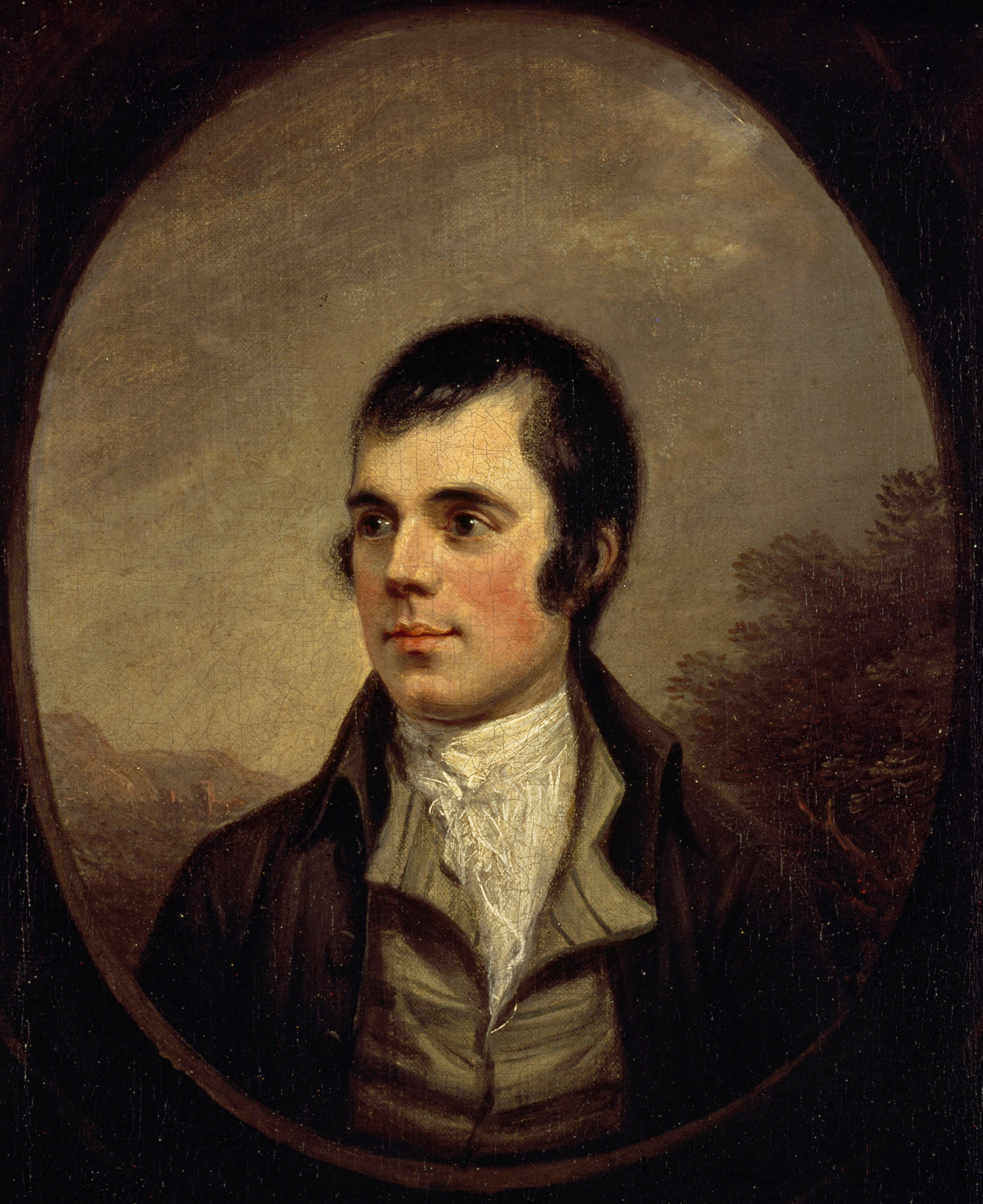
Full view of the Naysmith portrait of 1787, Scottish National Portrait Gallery

The poet is said to have visited her home one evening only to be politely informed that 'Tibbie' was not available as she was engaged with another admirer. Burns turned on his heels and never visited her again. Tibbie married her beau to become Mrs Isabella Allan and Robert turned his attention to Elizabeth Paton.

The poet wrote the caustic song "O Tibbie, I Hae Seen The Day" with the chorus:

O Tibbie, I hae seen the day,
Ye would na been sae shy,
For lack o' gear ye lightly me,
But, trowth, I care na by.

The love song, one of Burn's first in this category, is set to the tune "Invercauld's Reel", appears (no. 196) in Johnson's The Scots Musical Museum in 1788:

Yestreen I met ye on the moor,
Ye spak na, but gaed by like stoure;
Ye geck at me because I'm poor,
But fient a hair care I!

Tibbie however was proud enough to acknowledge that the song was about her and that she once held some affection for the poet. On an occasion when her grandson recited the song she told him that she was the heroine of the piece.

The poet scorns the heiress:

There lives a lass beside yon par',
I'd rather hae her in her sark
Than you wi a' your thousand mark,
That gars you look sae high.

A thousand marks or merks at the time would amount to around £56, close enough with poetic licence to £75. It is thought that the "lass beside yon park" refers to Elizabeth Paton although Burns never confirmed this.

== Micro-history ==
The National Trust for Scotland holds Isabella Steven's wedding spoon and spectacles at the Burns Birthplace Museum in Alloway.

== See also ==
- Jean Armour
- Lesley Baillie
- Alison Begbie
- Nelly Blair
- May Cameron
- Mary Campbell (Highland Mary)
- Jenny Clow
- Kate Kemp
- Nelly Kilpatrick
- Jessie Lewars
- Elizabeth Paton
- Anne Rankine
- Peggy Thompson
