= Haining Place and the Barony of Haining-Ross =

Haining Place
- Hurlford, East Ayrshire, Scotland; UK grid reference NS45253484
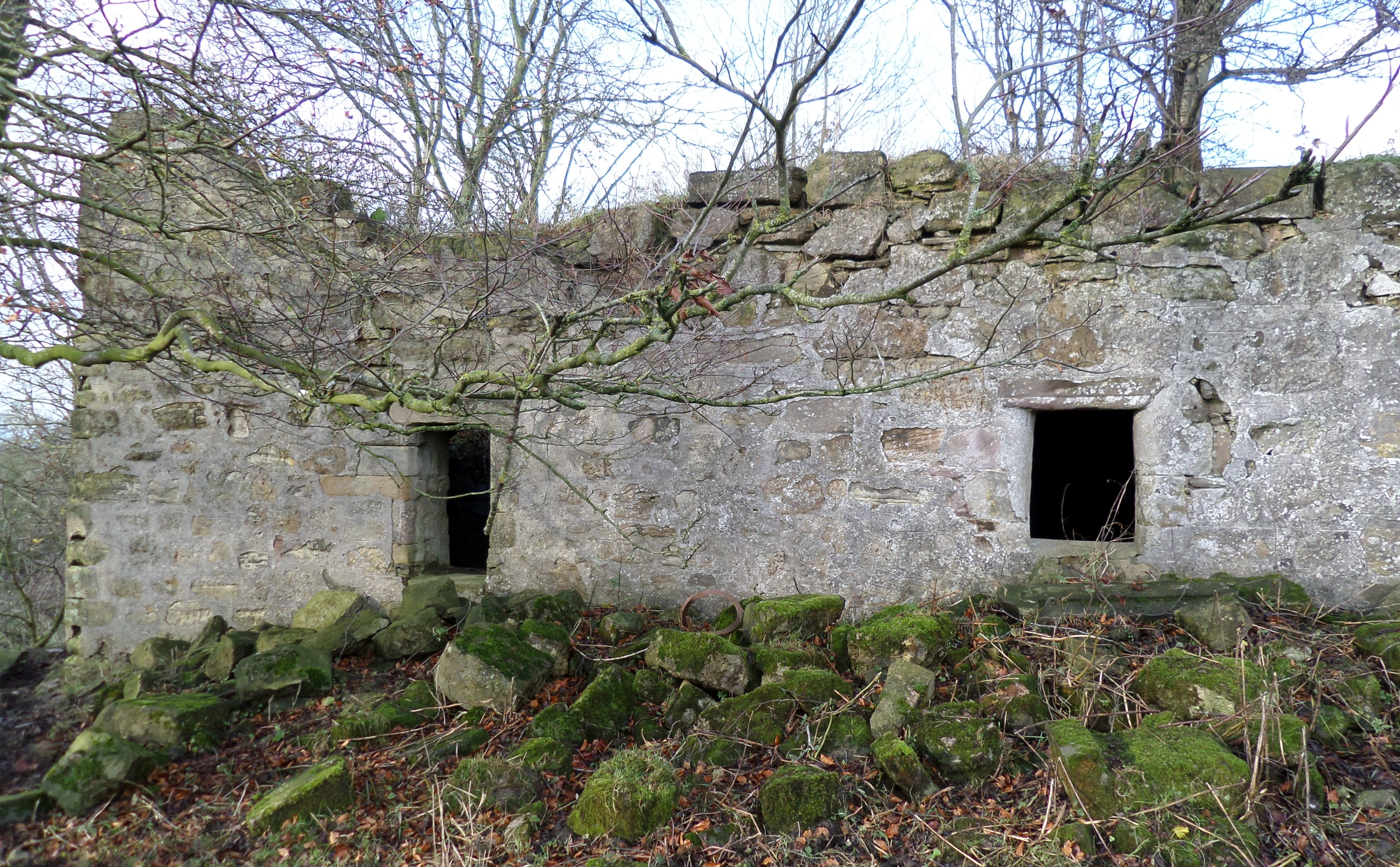
- Haining Place in 2015

Site information
- Type: Tower house
- Owner: Private
- Controlled by: Ross family
- Open to the public: No
- Condition: Ruined

Location
- Shown within Scotland
- Coordinates: 55.582565°N 4.456618°W

Site history
- Built: 16/17th century
- Materials: Stone

Haining Place or The Haining in the Parish of Kilmarnock lies near an old fording place across the Cessnock Water in East Ayrshire, Parish of Riccarton, Scotland. Hanyng (sic) was the caput or laird's dwelling of the Barony of Haining-Ross with a tower house or keep located in a defensive position on a high promontory of land, half encircled by the river. Later Haining Place may have been a dower house, then a tenanted farm, finally being used as farm workers accommodation. Haining Place is now a ruin following a fire. The old farm of Haining Mains is still located nearby.

== History ==
The Register of the Great Seal of Scotland records in 1665 the existence of the 'Lands and Barony of Haining-Ross' in the Parish of Riccarton, Bailliary of Kyle-Stuart and Sheriffdom of Ayr.

It is recorded that the lands of Haining had fortifications, a chapel, a mill at Craigmill on the Cessnock Water and Paroche, Overlane, Netherlane, Bruce-roddingis (sic) and Wraithe were properties within the barony. Woodlands held by the estate were Haining Wood, Dummuysdaill (sic), Urisbankis (sic), Craigenconner, Dowbank, Millbank and Garrochmurebank. The 'Gardens of Haining' are recorded in 1498.

A list dated 1498 of the holdings of the estate names the lands of 'Hanyng within the Ward; lands of Hanyng without the Ward; Gawines-fauld, alias Nemochis-fauld; Brigend, alias Wobsteris-maling; Urisbank; Wodsyde; Dubbis-medow, Paroche-medow and Langboig; lands of Paroche; lands of Ovir-Lone, Mossyde and Clauchraif; Quhithill; Craig-mylne and Toun-end of Nethir-Lone'.

Haining has previously been recorded on older maps, probably in error, as 'Hatting.' If correct this place name could be derived from the Gaelic athan meaning a 'ford or fordable river'. Haining Place stands beside an old ford and stepping stones. In Scots the more recent recorded name of 'Haining' is a 'fence, hedge or wall forming the boundary of an enclosure or a piece or stretch of ground enclosed in this way so as to protect a hay crop' from cattle, deer, etc. It is worth noting that at one time Haining had a lengthy pale or fence around its old deer park.

Smith in Prehistoric Man in Ayrshire records that three iron caltrops used for laming horses as a defence against attack were found at Haining and were in the collection of a Mr Peter Wright. The Tinkers Hill on Riccarton Moss may have been the barony's moot hill where the laird held his barony courts.

=== The Lairds of Haining-Ross ===
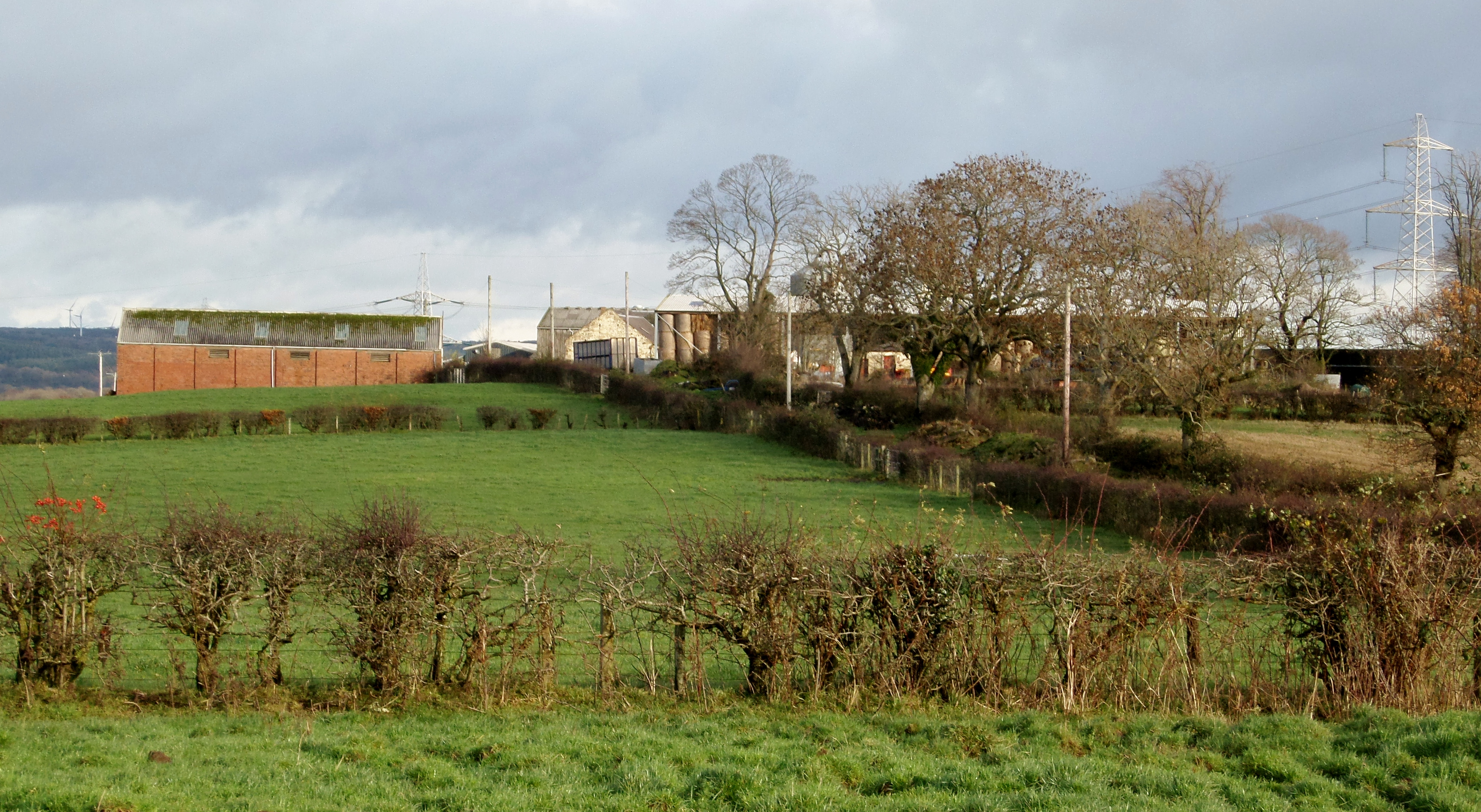
Haining Mains Farm.

One record states that the Barony of Haining-Ross was held by the Dukes of Albany.

In the 14th century Andrew de Ross, son of Sir Godfrey de Ross, Sheriff of Ayr, is considered to have been an ancestor of the Ross families of Haining, Galston and Montgreenan. As followers of the English supporting faction and John Balliol many of the Ross family lands were confiscated although some were later restored to them.

In the 15th century a David Campbell of Skerrington near Cumnock is said to have married a sister of Stewart of Haining.

The Exchequer Rolls of Scotland in 1475 record that John Ross has possession of Hanyng (sic). In 1484 Elizabeth, George Ross of Haining's daughter, married Charles Fullerton of Dreghorn. In 1521 Janet, George Ross's daughter, married Robert Lindsay, grandson of the laird of Corsbascat (sic) (Crossbasket). Janet Ross was a parishioner of Riccarton and they married at the mansion chapel of George Ross at Haining. On 23 January 1522 the banns for marriage had been called in the family chapel with Sir John Ledhouse, curate of Riccarton present for Janet and Sir Gavin Brown, curate of East Kilbride present for Robert. In 1527 George Ross's daughter Mariota had married Edward Cunninghame, who was killed as a result of a feud.

On the third of October 1528 the laird of Haining was at Mauchline Castle in the company of the bailie of the Barony of Kylesmuir, Hugh Campbell and the lairds of Ardgowan, Leiffnoris, Caprington and Ochiltree. It was the eve of the annual Mauchline Fair. John Ross in 1535 had formal possession of lands in Haining with its fortifications, mill at Craigmill, etc. John Ross in 1551 had not taken formal possession of Haining and as a result it was "granted" to others; by 1554 the Queen quitclaimed Haining to John Ross and his wife Mariota Hamilton.

George Ross of Haining took part in the 'Langside rebellion' of 1571 but was forgiven his involvement under legal conditions of future appropriate behaviour. John Ross of Haining in 1588 had to pay twenty pounds for the 20 pound land of Haining as payment towards supporting two commissioners to Parliament. John had two sons, George and Thomas. By 1593 John Ross of Haining had died and his heir George Ross was granted the properties within the Barony of Haining of Paroche, Overlane, Netherlane, Bruce-roddingis and Wraithe.

The under-tenants of John Ross who held land in Haining-Ross had become concerned as to their legal status because their superior had failed for forty years to formally acquire possession of the barony. Among those with an interest at this time were John Ross, James Ross, James Ross, the younger, Andrew/Alexander Ross, Robert Ross of Thornton and Hugh Ross. In 1597 Matthew Ross of Haining and Galston was given formal possession of Haining-Ross; his daughter Janet married Hugh Kennedy of Bennane.

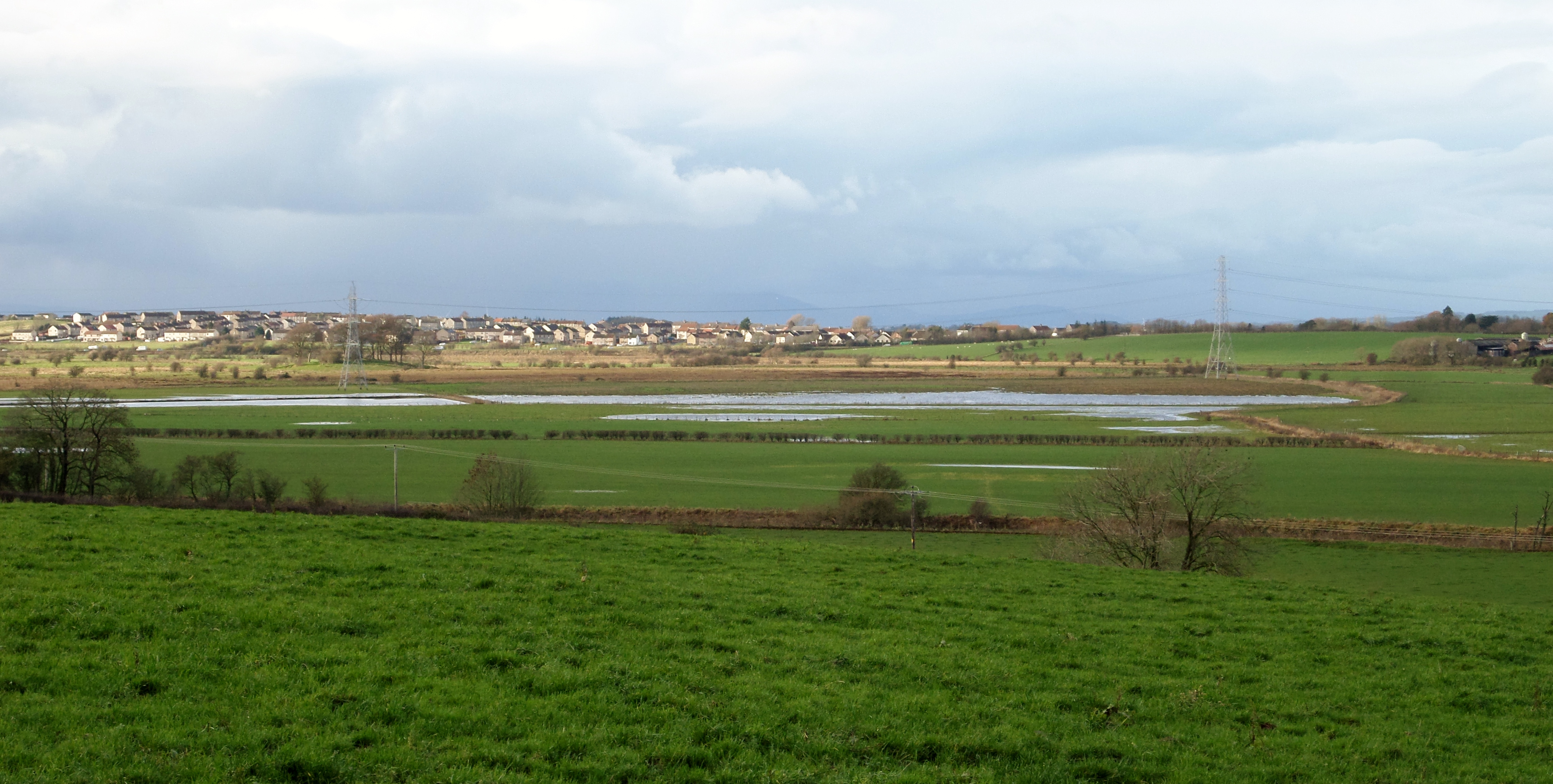
Riccarton Moss from Haining Place with the Tinkers Hill, possibly the barony moot hill.

In 1599 John Ross and Marion Hamilton of Haining are recorded as having three sons James, Thomas, Matthew and Allen. In 1611 Marion Hamilton Ross was recorded as 'lady of Haining'. Margaret Wallace Ross in 1617 was termed 'dame of Hayning'; her daughter married Adam Stewart of Barskimming in 1610. Margaret Boyle in 1629 is recorded as the mother of Matthew Ross of Haining. In the mid 16th century Marian Boyle, daughter of John Boyle of Kelburn married Matthew Ross of Haining and children were born of the union.

In 1685 the Records of the Parliament of Scotland recorded an act of annexation of lands to the crown in which the lands and barony of Haining-Grass (sic) or Haining-Ross were annexed by James VII from Sir Hugh and Sir George Campbell of Cessnock to the crown."baronies, heritages, rooms, possessions, mills, woods, fishings, tacks, steadings, teinds, annual rents, patronages, wadsets, expired apprisings and adjudications, castles, towers, fortalices, houses, biggings, yards, orchards, annexes, connexes, tenants, goods and acres and all other heritages, lands and estates whatsoever pertaining and belonging to the forenamed persons, rebels and traitors."

In 1770 the Barony of Haining was, together with those of Cessnock, Riccarton & Galston, to be sold as one lot or in parcels.

The Ordnance Survey Name Book for 1855-1857 records that Haining Place was a farmhouse owned by the Duke of Portland and occupied by a George Bowie.

=== Cartographic evidence ===
Robert Gordon's map of 1636-52 gives the name as 'Hatting' with Dullers (sic), Carnell and Sefnock (sic) located nearby along the course of the Cessnock Water with the same map symbol used to designate the status of the dwelling in each case.

Joan Blaeu's map of 1654, based on the earlier circa 1604 map by Timothy Pont also names 'Hatting' with 'Dullers' located downstream on the Cessnock Water. The dwelling at 'Hatting' is shown with woodlands in the immediate vicinity. A pale or fence is shown surrounding a probable deer park with woodlands that extends as far as a dwelling named as 'Paragh'.

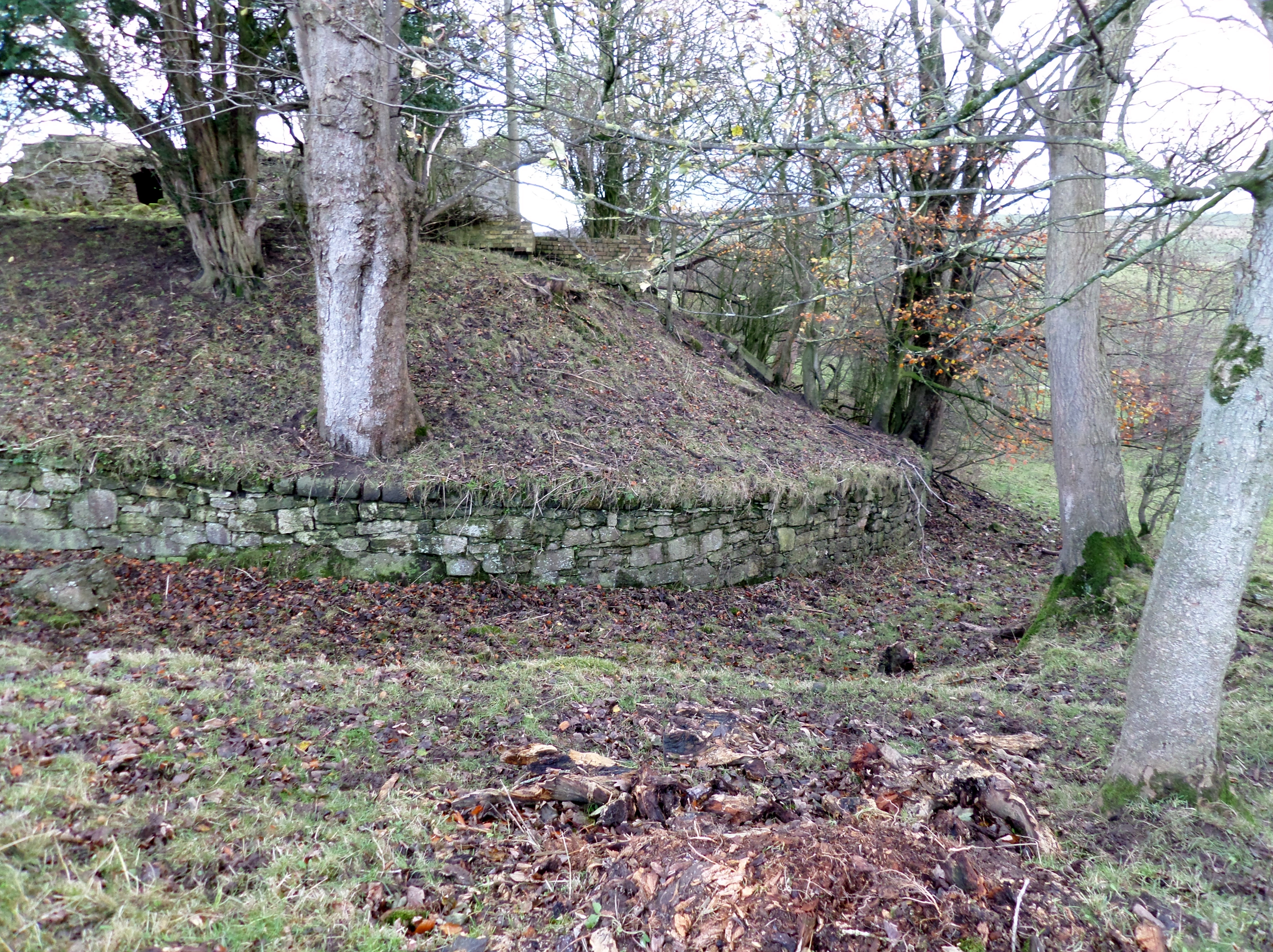
The castle mound and the Gypsy Path.

Herman Moll's map of 1745 records 'Hatting' as well as 'Dullers' dwellings in this area. This map also indicates a pale or deer park at Dullers (sic), but not at Hatting.

William Roy's map of 1747-55 records the name as 'Haining', with 'Dillars' nearby. Braehead is recorded opposite Haining for the first time and the dwelling of 'Purnoch' is shown to the north-west. A significant Woodland is shown nearby at Dykehead as well as around Haining. Several groups of buildings are shown around Haining Place at this time.

Andrew Armstrong's map of 1775 shows 'Haning' with its surrounding woodlands and for the first time the name 'Auchenskeigh' replaces 'Dullers' or its variants. A toll is shown on the nearby road to Mauchline from Kilmarnock. The symbols used for the status of significant dwellings at the two 'lairds houses' are the same. Braehead is not shown.

Taylor and Skinner's map of 1776 shows the estate of 'Auchenskeich' as the property of Captain Cunningham, however Haining, etc are not marked.

John Ainslie's map of 1821 marks Haining and 'Auchenskaith' in bold print as 'important' dwellings together with Knockmarloch, Treesbank, Ingotrick, etc., all with the same map symbol. No mention is made of Braehead, etc. On this map Cessnock Water is given as the 'Haining Water'.

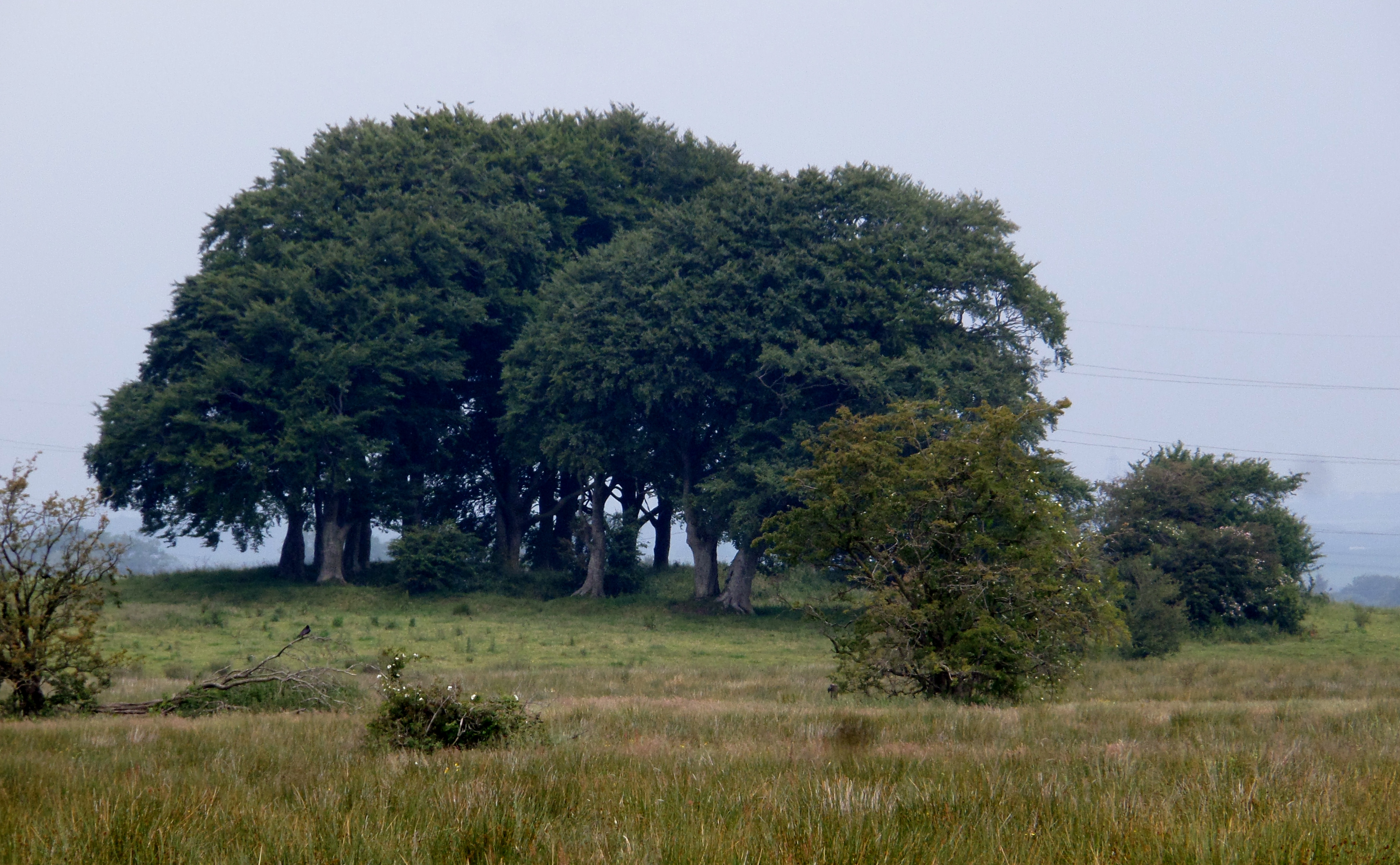
The Tinkers Hill thought to have been the court hill of the barony of Haining-Ross.

John Thomson's map of 1828 shows Haining with wooded areas and a dwelling at East Park in the vicinity of the old deer park area, Parroch is recorded and the name 'Dallars' replaces variants of 'Auchenskeigh'. A lane is shown running towards Haining from a lane running to Riccarton on the western side only of the Cessnock Water that would require a ford crossing.

The 25 inch to the mile, 1st edition OS map of 1857 shows the name 'Dollars', Braehead is marked and a ford is suggested by lanes running down to the Cessnock Water with stepping stones marked. Haining Place is recorded with a dwelling of Greenhead nearby on the lane running northwards towards the Kilmarnock to Mauchline Road. The lane bypasses Haining Place and regular plantings of what may be fruit trees run to the west and east. Haining Place is shown as an L-shaped building with two significant buildings nearby on each side of the lane but no walled garden to the east. A small pond is shown and Haining Mains is located nearby. A gravel pit is present near Braehead Farm and a whinstone quarry lies below the mansion house of Haining. What appears to be a walled garden with ornate plantings lies to the north west of the house within a woodland setting.

In 1890 Greenhead is still present and a wood remains to the east of Haining Mains. In 1895 the Haining Ford is clearly marked however the only building close to Haining Place shown as roofed is the 'place' itself and the pond and walled garden in the wood are absent although the 'orchard' remains. A walled 'garden' area now lies to the east of the mansion house. Greenhead is no longer named. In 1908 Haining Place has two greenhouses present, little else has changed.

In 1955 Haining Place is still marked and its location shown near a still extant through road to Shortlees via Crossbush and Bridgehouse Farms.

== History and description of Haining Place ==
Kersland Castle near Dalry with the date 1604 on an armorial panel shows some features in common with Haining Place in that it has vaulted chambers on the ground floor and today represents a fortified structure partly demolished and replaced with a farmhouse and steading.

=== 1930s descriptions ===
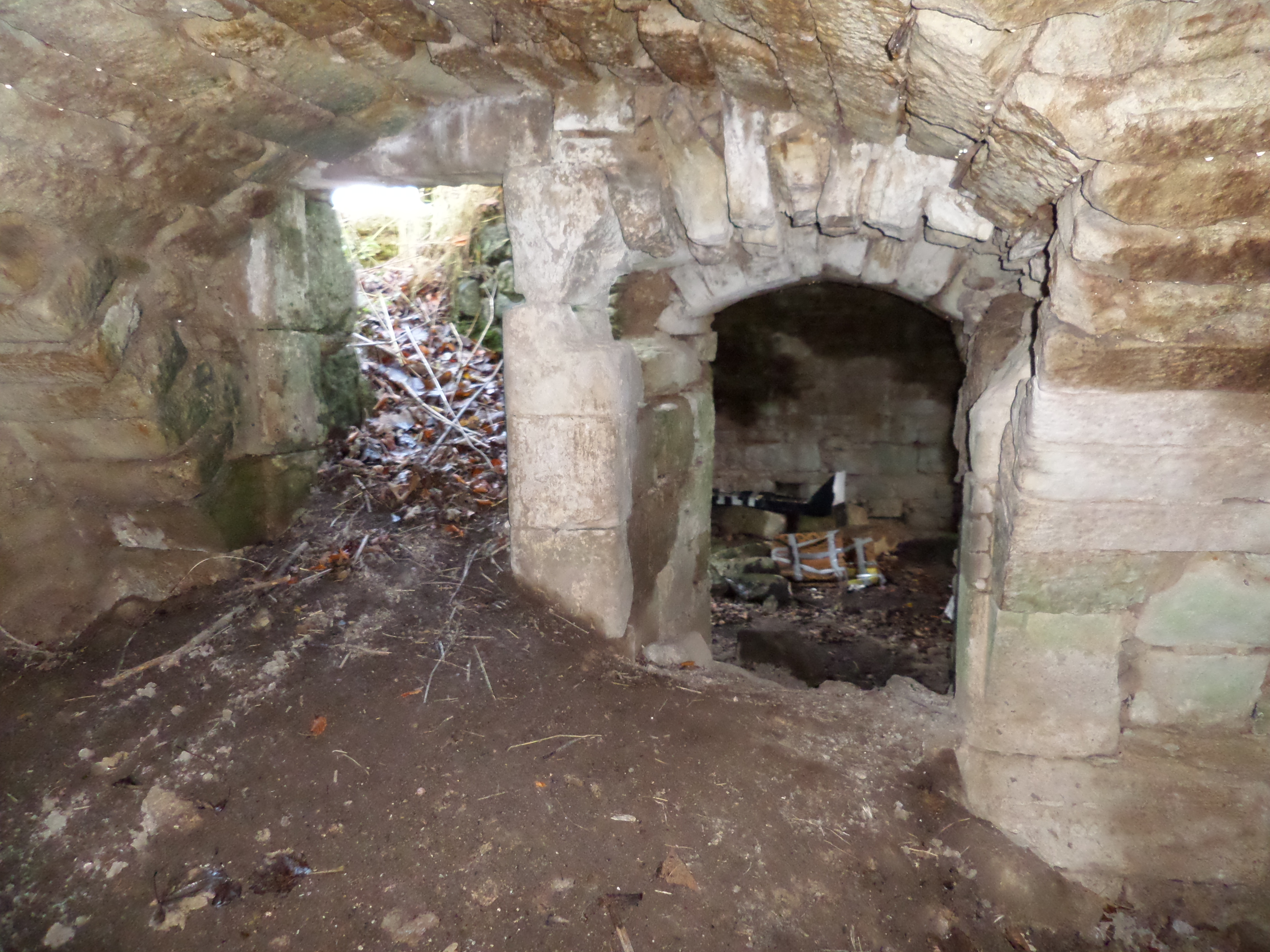
Vaulted ground floor chambers.

In 1930 the building is described as an 'Old World Mansion on the Cessnock' and it was entered via a tall arched entrance that was topped by a weather vane and flanked by two lions'. It is referred to as 'Haining' or the 'Place of Haining' and a local tradition is recorded that Mary, Queen of Scots once stayed there. The building had two storeys in 1930 with an outside set of steps giving access to the upper or first floor storey, whilst the lower three stone vaulted chambers were only in use as a store. The ground floor windows were narrow slits as the walls were as thick as an ancient keep. The writer speculates that the first floor was built upon a ruined keep and records that the outside steps appeared a 'restoration' addition and that a fanlight of many panes of glass existed above the entrance as found in very old houses. It is further speculated that, as the dwelling has little traditional history attached to it, it may have seen use as dower house to a nearby estate.

In 1931 the Kilmarnock Glenfield Ramblers had an outing to Riccarton Moss and Haining Place and commented on the ancient mansion-house of Haining which they considered as having once been much larger with its thick walls and 'springs of arches at different parts of the outside walls'. Several acres of apples and pear trees had existed around the 'Place' until recent times, however most had been cut down recently because of their age and lack of productivity. The 'Gipsy Steps' is the name given to the track that leads down to the ford and stepping stones across the Cessnock Water.

=== 2015 description ===
The photographs illustrate that the entrance arch has been removed and the two terracotta lions are now located at Haining Mains Farm. The steps leading up to the first floor of Haining Place are identifiable together with a contemporary stone and brick built arched support to a first floor structure. The first floor building is almost entirely absent. Two stone bases to internal revetted door jambs are prominent features mid-way along the building, indicating a possible great hall and private chambers division. The old fireplace surround on the ground floor has been removed however the three vaulted ground floor chambers remain intact with windows to the east, some open and blocked windows to the west and the remnants of a wheel stairwell, located on the west facing side of the building. The brick lined ruined byre stands at right angles to the dwelling place and features such as a wash house can still be discerned. Evidence on the stone work points to glass window panes in such areas as the spiral staircase. The base of a large window exists on the northern section at first floor level. Numerous indications of later improvements exists indicating that the castle was adapted as a superior dwelling. The brick access to the first floor level were once covered with large stone steps sporting a metal railings. Evidence through the placing of the three vaults suggests a smaller tower was later extended and a wing was removed from what may have been an L-shaped building at one stage. A carved gun port now lies in two pieces near the old entrance arch.

=== The Cable bridge ===
The tenants of Haining Place for many years were the Cunninghame family who, being friendly with the family at the nearby Braehead Farm, constructed a cable bridge across the Cessnock Water using two steel hawsers that were secured to either bank and a person crossed by holding on to the top whilst standing on the bottom cable and edging across, thereby ensuring dry feet when the water level was high.

== Haining Mains ==
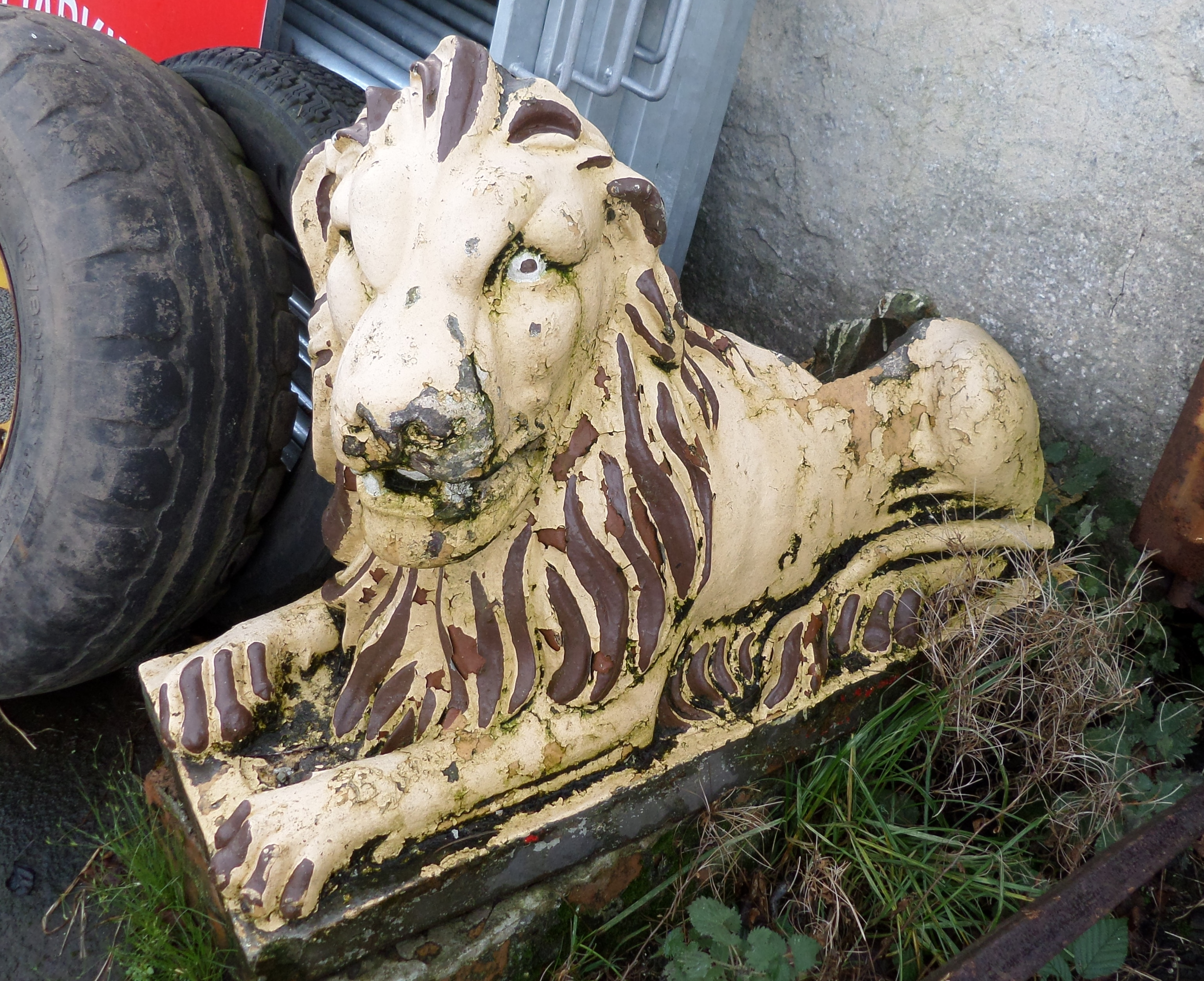
Terracotta lion from Haining Place.

Farms with the name 'mains' were usually associated with mansions as a provider of food, etc for the owners family and servants. The farm is clearly shown on the first OS maps of the 1850s. A lintel over an old door at Haining Mains has the initials 'J W' accompanied by the date '1829' and records show that it was occupied by the Wilson family in the 1870s when David Wilson and his wife Jemima (nee Boyd) lived there with his mother Elizabeth (nee McKerrow). In 1887 the death of James Shaw of Haining Mains is recorded and David Shaw was the farmer here in 1890. The parish cemetery was next to the church in Riccarton. The two recumbent lions that were once located on the entrance wall at Haining Place now reside at the entrance to the yard at Haining Mains. In 1857 a large woodland lay to the east of the farm and well laid out gardens lay behind the house.

=== The Tenants at Haining Place and Mains ===
In the 1850s George Bowie was the tenant at Haining Place. John Dunlop is recorded as the farmer at Haining Place in 1868. In the 1890 Haining Mains Farm was a part of the Duke of Portland's estates, occupied by David Shaw. The final occupants of Haining Place were three farm worker families who were moved to new housing in Kilmarnock.

== John Goudie of Craigmill (1717-1809) ==
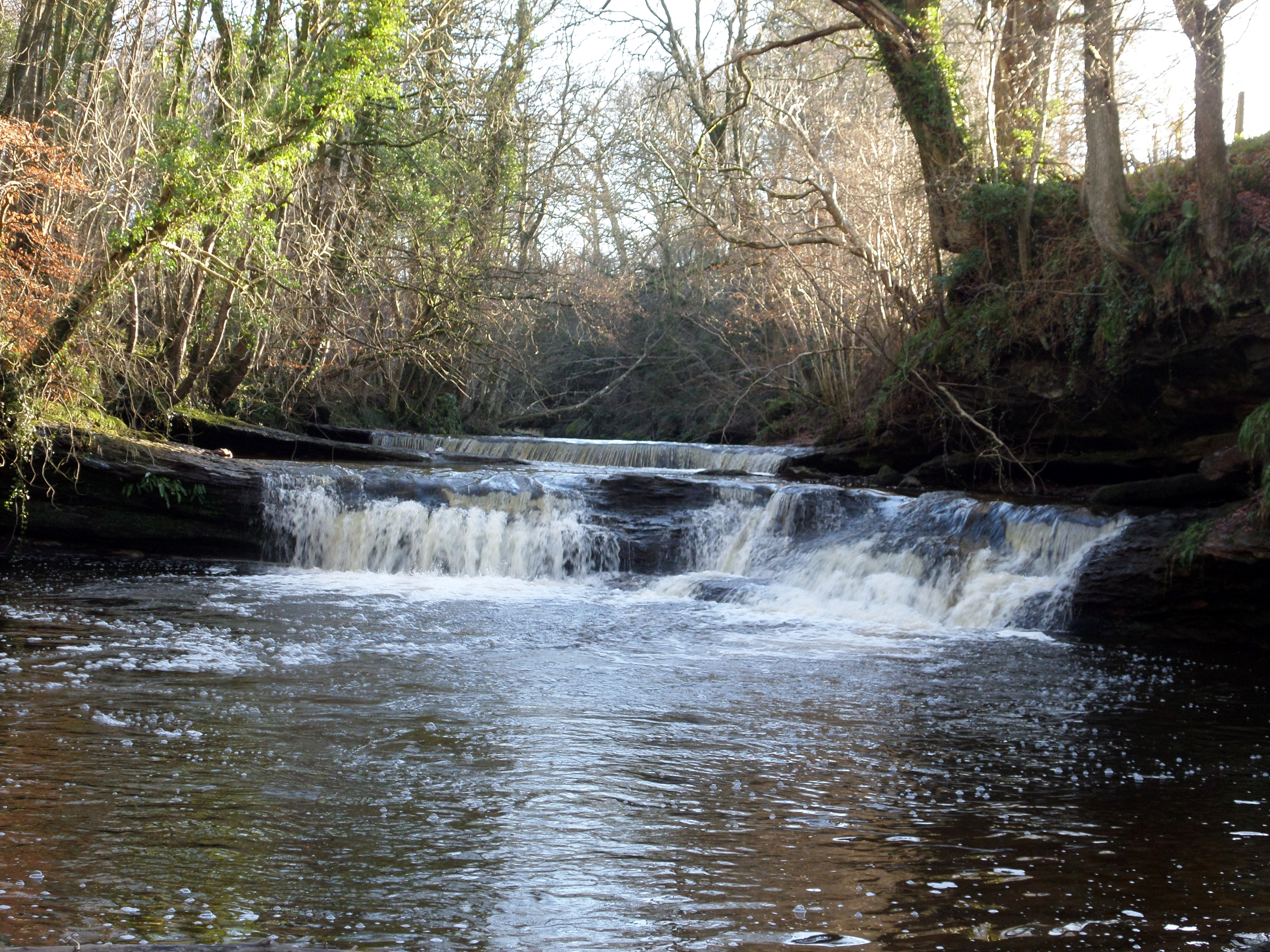
The Craigmill Falls on the Cessnock water.

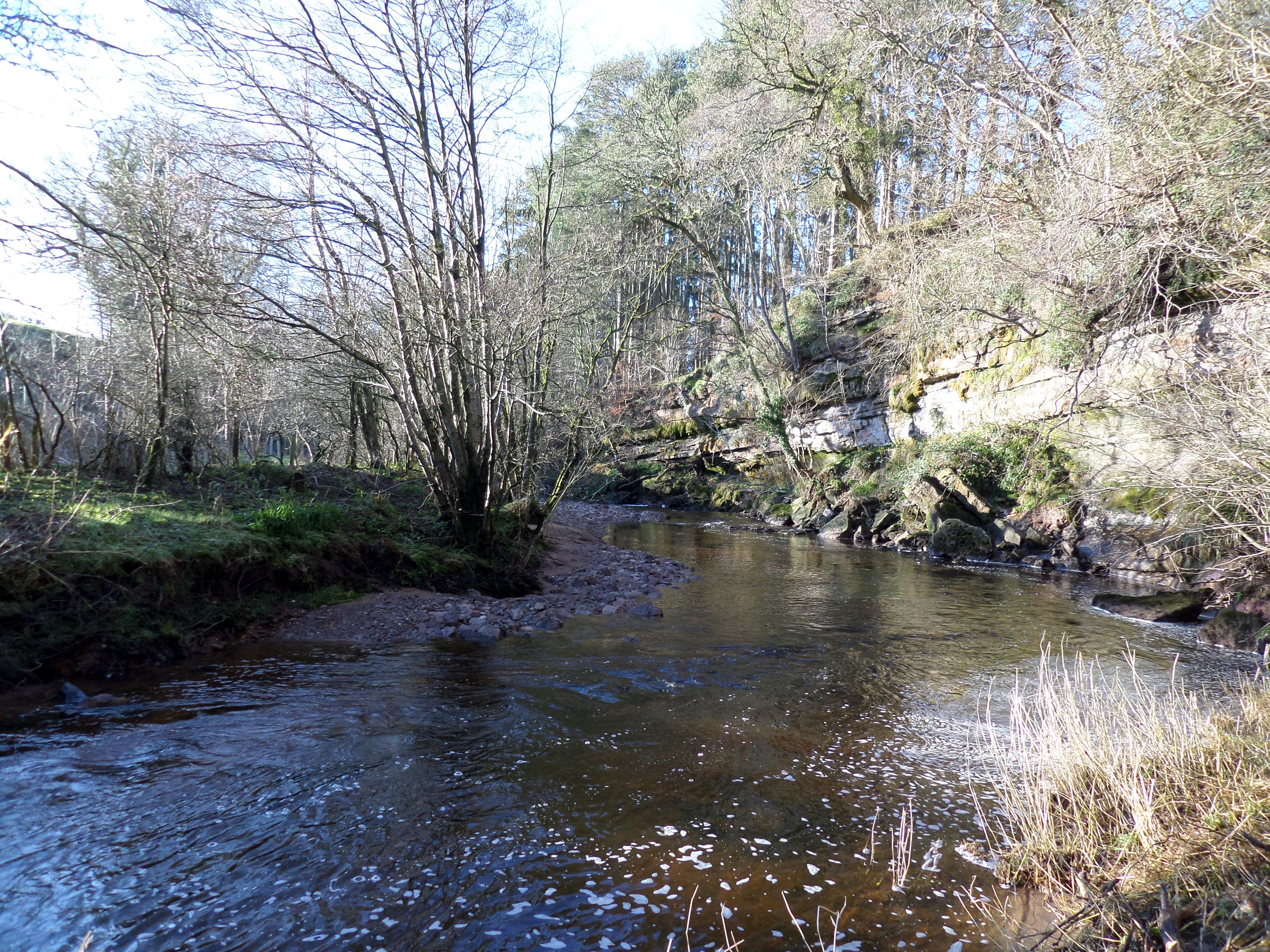
The site of Craig Mill on the Cessnock Water.

John Goudie (or Goldie) of Craigmill, the barony mill on the Cessnock Water, was the son of the miller there. Aged only 14 John made a working model of an advanced type of water mill that attracted much local interest and he was even given money to improve its construction. He moved to Kilmarnock and for a time he was a cabinet maker but later became a wine merchant, all the while continuing with his scientific and theological interests, writing on various topics, moral and divine, his publication of 1780 becoming known as 'Goudie's Bible.' Goudie became friendly with Robert Burns who wrote the 'Epistle to John Goldie', saying :

"O Gowdie, terror o' the Whigs,,
Dread o' blackcoats and reverend wigs!
Sour bigotry on his last legs,
Girns an' looks back,.
Wishing the ten Egyptian plagues,
May seize you quick...

Craigmill on the Cessnock Water near the barony wood of Craigenconnor was demolished by 1908 and nothing substantial remains on site.

== Micro-history ==
The Kilmarnock Glenfield Ramblers visited Haining Place on 02/05/1931 and observed the stocking of the river with trout by the Hurlford and District Angling Club.

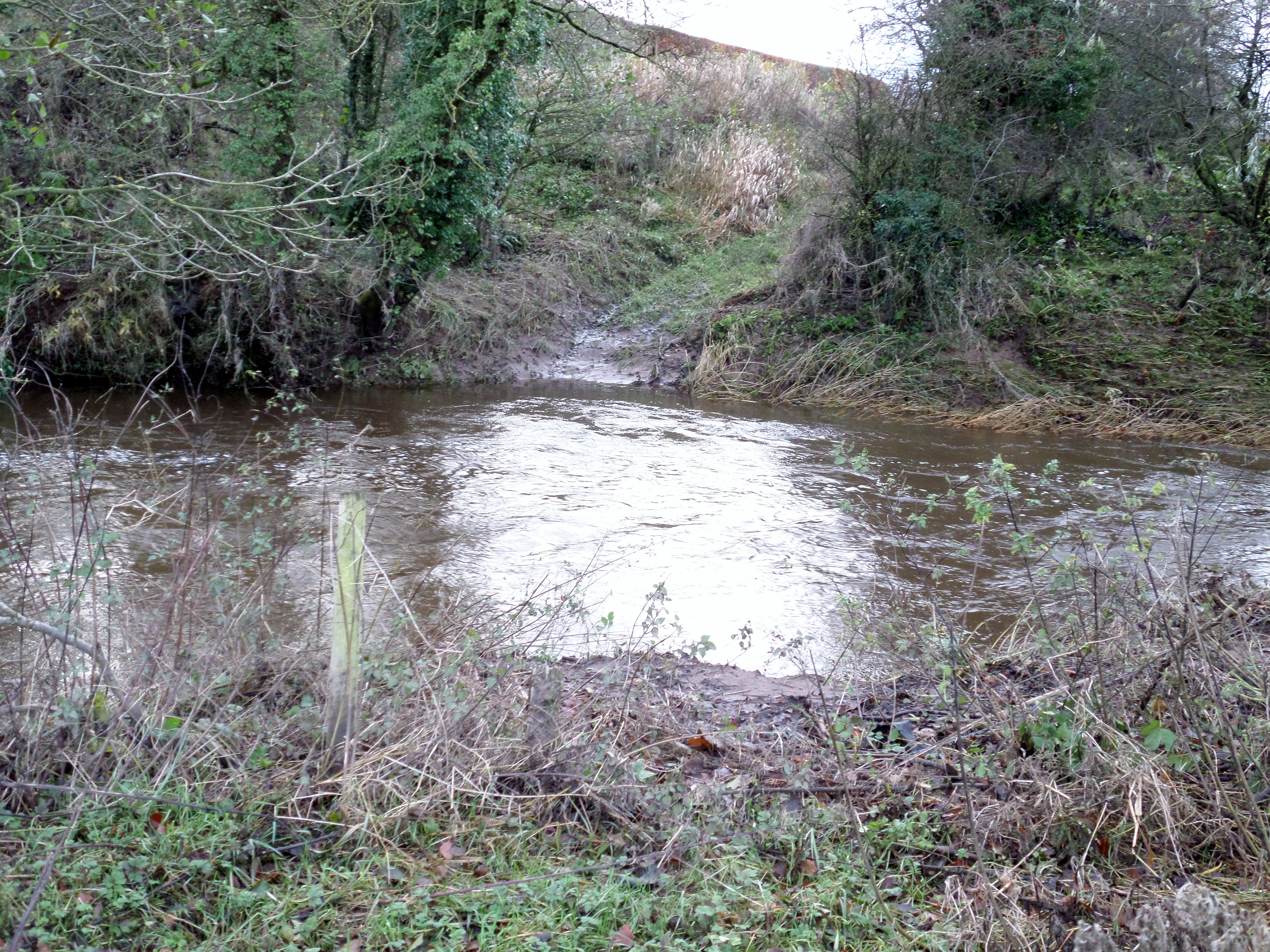
The Haining Ford over the Cessnock Water.

The Glenfield Ramblers also noted that the rare Dusky Cranesbill (Geranium phaeum) grew at the site as well as Toothwort (Lathraea squamaria) and Cotoneaster.

David Shaw of Haining Mains Farm was one of the pioneers of the use of milking machines for cows and together with a Mr Murchland from Kilmarnock produced one of the first successful milking machines as far back as 1890.

The nearby estate of Dallars may derive its name from the Welsh dol for 'meadow' and ar for ploughed land as in 'Dollar' near Alloa. Its name was changed to 'Auchenskeith' following its purchase by the owner of the Auchenskeith estate near Dalry in North Ayrshire. The old name has since returned to favour.

Alison Begbie is said to have been proposed to by Robert Burns. She was the daughter of a farmer and at the time of her courtship by Robert Burns she was a servant employed at Carnell House, then known as Cairnhill, close to the Cessnock Water. Alison Begbie may have lived at 'Old Place', now Shawsmill Farm and just a short distance downstream of Haining Place. Burns was living at Lochlea Farm at this time.

The Haining is a country house and estate in Selkirk in the Scottish Borders.

== See also ==
- Lands of Dallars
