= Alison Begbie =

Courted by Robert Burns (1762–1823)

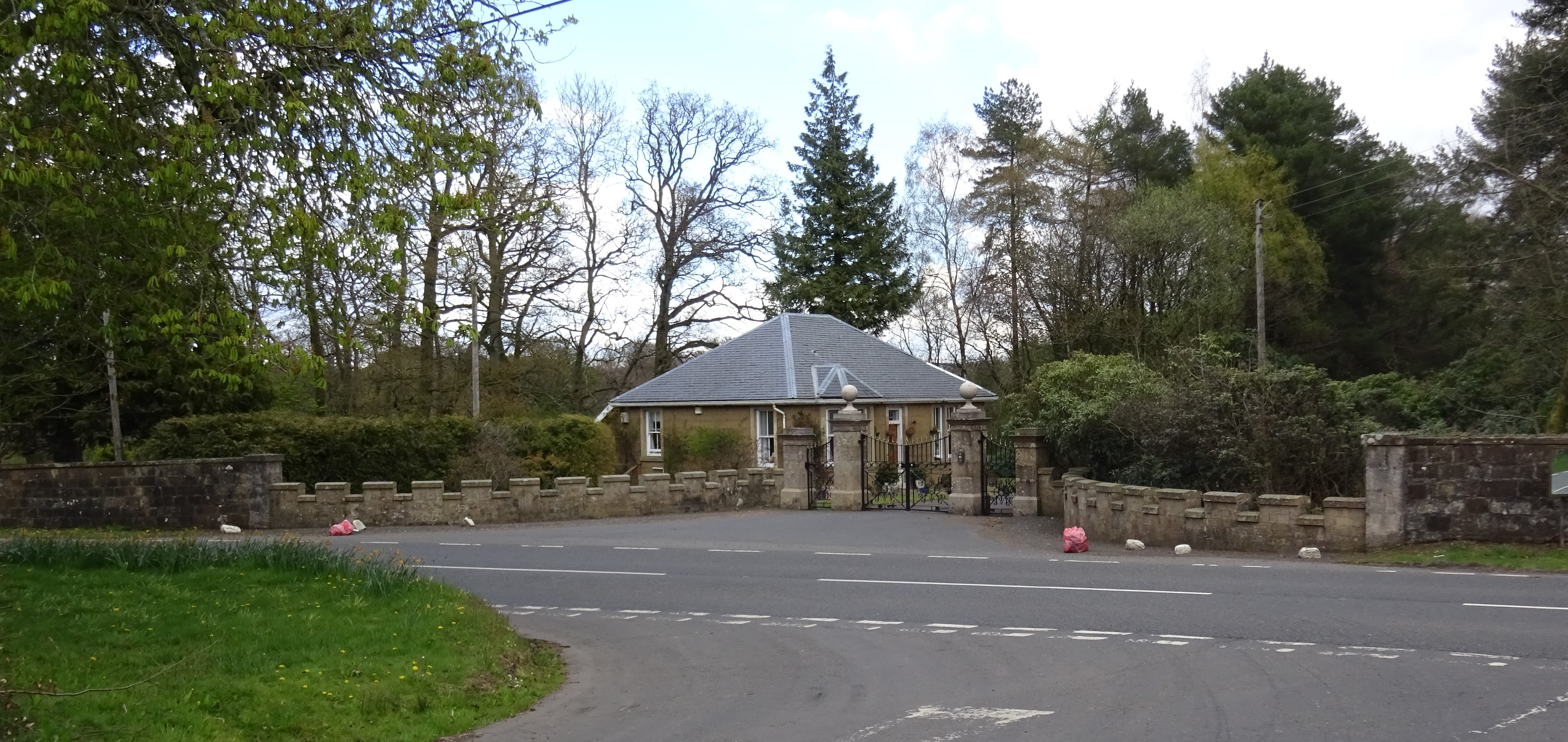
- Carnell House lodge and gate
- Born: 1762; Galston, East Ayrshire, Scotland
- Died: by June 1823; Scotland
- Occupations: Housekeeper and housewife

Alison Begbie, Ellison Begbie or Elizabeth Gebbie (1762–1823), is said to have been the daughter of a farmer, born in the parish of Galston, and at the time of her courtship by Robert Burns she is thought to have been a servant or housekeeper employed at Carnell House, then known as Cairnhill, on the River Cessnock, situated about 2 miles from Loudoun Mill. It is thought that Burns's youngest sister Isobel Burns confused her name, which was really Elizabeth Gebbie.

== Life and character ==
Alison may have lived at Old Place, now Shawsmill Farm, the daughter of a tenant-farmer. Burns was living at Lochlea Farm at this time. Although not a beauty, she had many charming qualities, inspired by an education somewhat beyond anything that Burns had ever encountered before in a female.

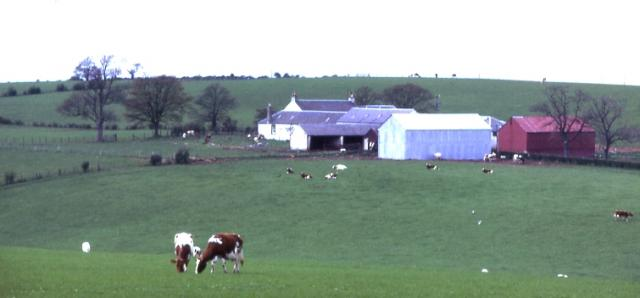
Lochlea Farm

Alison reportedly met Burns in 1781 near Lochlea Farm, either when he was passing Carnell with his cart for coals or collecting lime from the Carnell lime kilns located between Dykehead and Snodston.

Burns had hoped to set up a household of his own with her. Her rejection of him may have significantly contributed to the depressive illness that he suffered whilst living and working in Irvine.

Alison's surname was difficult to pair in rhyme, so Robert is said to have used artistic licence and named her in his work as 'Peggy Alison'.

Burns said of her, "All these charming qualities, heightened by an education much beyond anything I have ever met in any woman I ever dared to approach, have made an impression on my heart that I do not think the world can ever efface."

She was flattered enough, however, to commit Burns's 'Cessnock Banks' verses about her to memory and when an older lady, living in Glasgow, at 74 King Street, this lady was able to repeat, fairly accurately, most of them, 26 years after first hearing them, to Robert Hartley Cromek of Hull, the author of the 1811 publication "Reliques of Robert Burns." He does not give the first name of Mrs Brown, simply stating that the song was from "A lady residing in Glasgow, whom the bard in early life affectionately admired." Elizabeth Brown, née Gebbie, her husband Hugh are known to have moved to Glasgow. They had four children, Helen (b.Nov. 1784), Agnes (b.June 1787), Hugh (b.June 1789) and Elizabeth (b.April 1791).

=== Elizabeth Gebbie ===
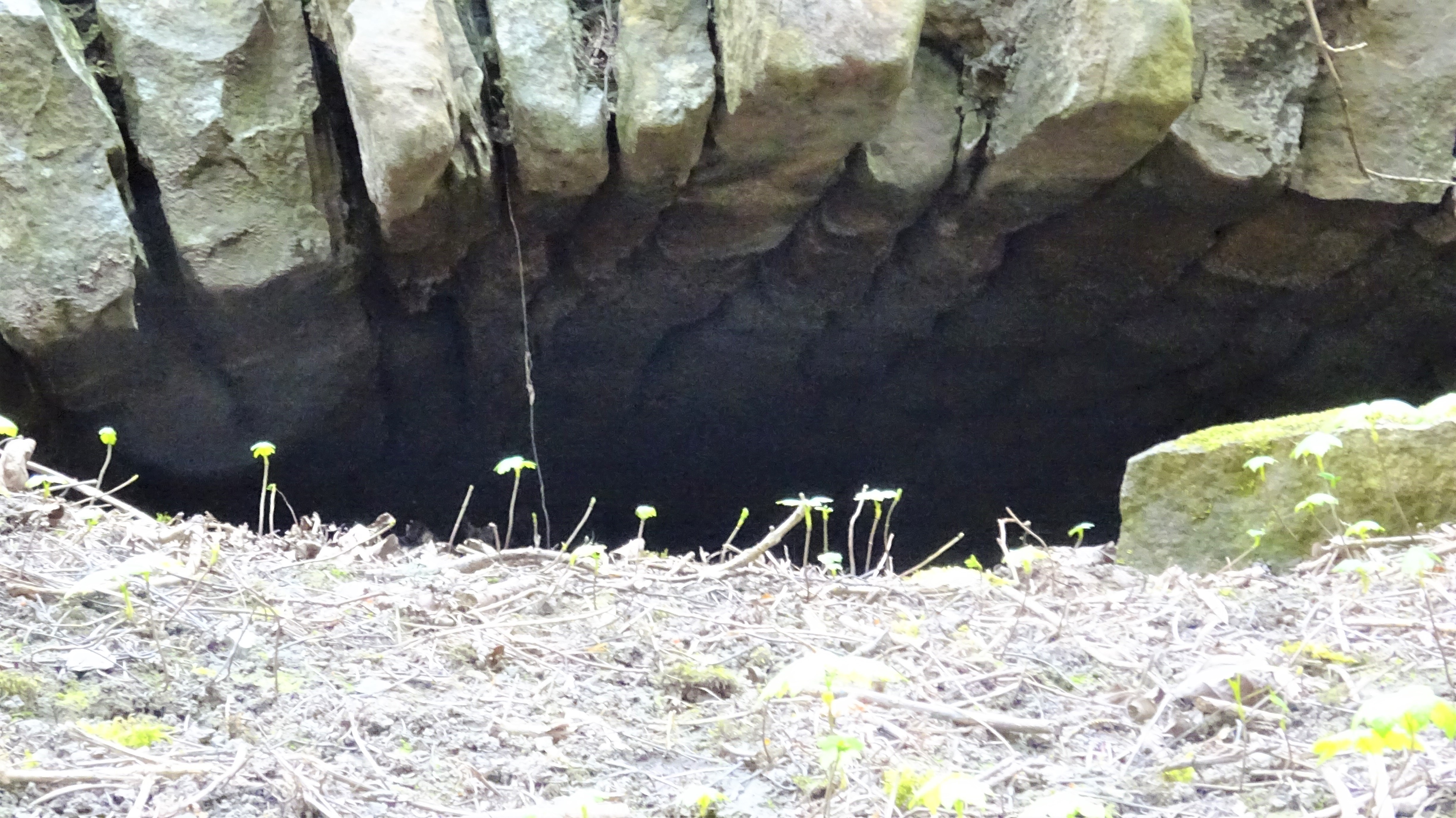
The kiln eye at Carnell's lime kiln ruins

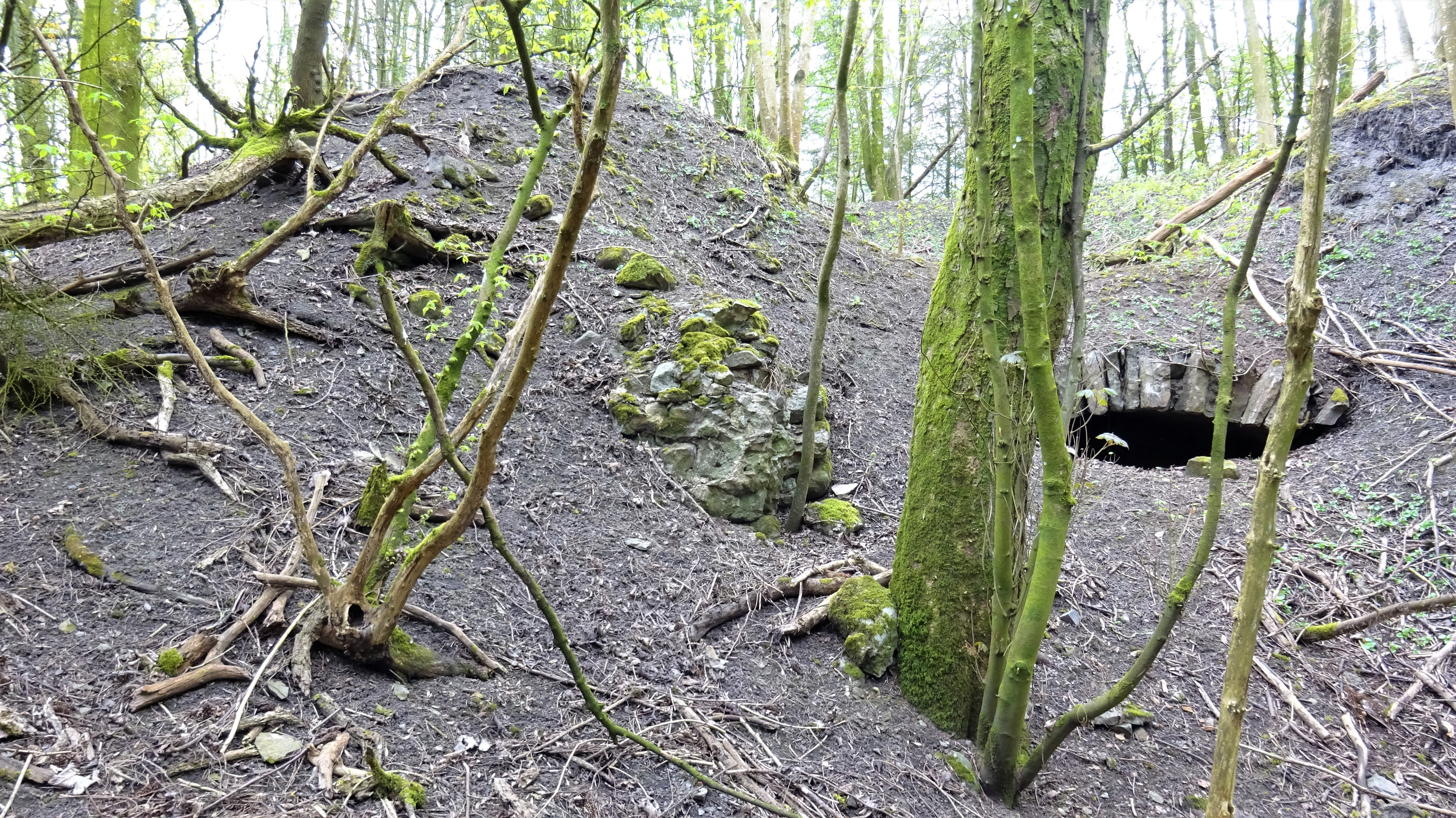
The old Carnell Estate lime kiln.

Isobel Burns, later Mrs. Begg, provided the name Alison Begbie to the Burns biographer Dr Robert Chambers when she was 76 years of age, recollecting events and details from when she was ony 9 or 10 years old. Research by James Mackay suggests that 'Elison Begbie' was in fact a confused recollection of the name Elizabeth Gebbie, a surname which does appear in the Galston parish register. Thomas Gebbie was a tenant-farmer at Pearsland Farm near Galston and his brother was the miller at Loudoun Mill. Thomas had a daughter, Elizabeth on 22 July 1762. Elizabeth married Hugh Brown at Newmilns on 23 November 1781, and the couple had their first two children, Helen and Agnes, whilst in Ayrshire. Elizabeth had died by June 1823. This Elizabeth appears to have been the woman who rejected Robert Burns and left him with a deep emotional scar, reflected possibly in the use of the Christian name Elizabeth for three of his daughters.

She may have been the heroine of one of Burns's earliest songs 'Farewell to Eliza.'

== Association with Robert Burns ==
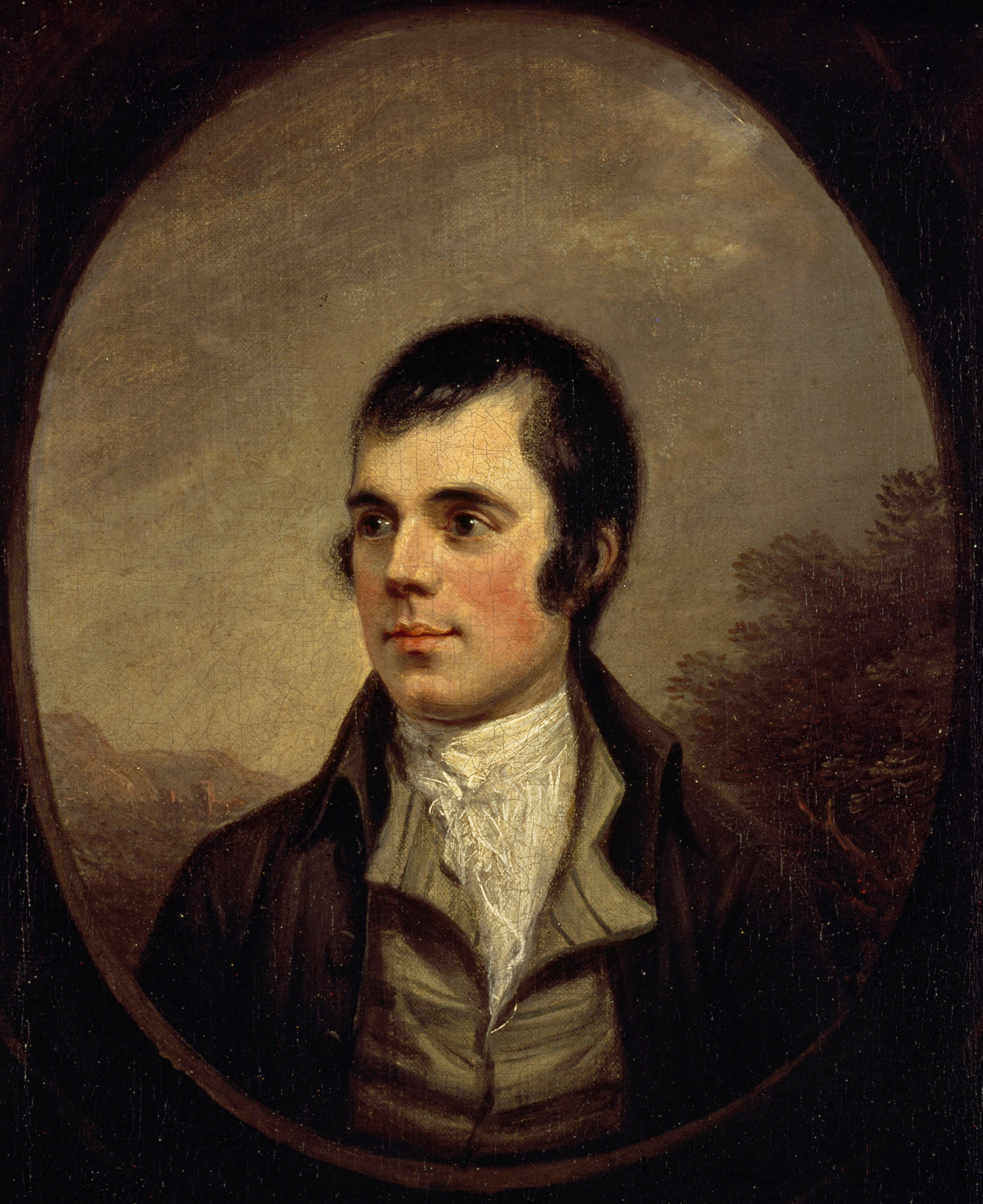
Full view of the Naysmith portrait of 1787, Scottish National Portrait Gallery

She may have met Burns during his visits to collect lime with his father from the Cairnhill (later Carnell) kiln close to her home and place of work.

Although four draft letters from Burns were claimed by Dr James Currie to have been sent to Alison Begbie, only one in manuscript form survives, this being the first, in which Burns hopes, using the introduction "My dear E", the recipient will not despise him because he is "ignorant of the flattering arts of courtship." The others letters were only found in draft form among Burns's papers as lent to him by Jean Armour. A proposal of marriage is made in the fourth letter: "If you will be so good and so generous as to admit me for your partner, your companion, your bosom friend through life, there is nothing on this side of eternity shall give me greater transport." it seems that he may have been too shy to propose to her in person. It is clear from the fourth letter that a reply had been received from "My dear E". A fifth draft letter with the line "I am a stranger in these matters A --" was uncovered by John Adam of Greenock.

In an autobiographical letter, Robert Burns stated that in his 23rd year "a bellefille whom I adored", jilted or refused him "with peculiar circumstances of mortification." It was Isabella Burns who first said that Alison Begbie was the person her brother referred to, for the fifth letter in the series, supposedly to Begbie, gives no indication of the existence of any such proposal and refusal. The letters, it has been suggested, may not have been his personal letters after all, written instead by Burns on behalf of another individual in an unrelated romantic relationship.

Alison is likely to be the "lass of Cessnock Banks" who inspired "On Cessnock banks a lassie dwells", and the Peggy Alison of "Ilk care and fear, when thou art near", both of whom appear in the tunes of "The Butcher Boy" and "Braes o' Balquidder." Alison may also have been the central figure of the love song "O Mary at thy window be" for Mary Morison, the central figure, is thought to have actually met Robert Burns on only one occasion. Burns called this Cessnock Lass work his Song of Similes and it was set to the tune if he be a Butcher neat and trim.

"But it's not her air her form her face,,
Tho' matching Beauty's fabled Queen:
Tis the mind that shines in ev’ry grace –,
An’ chiefly in her roguish een!.

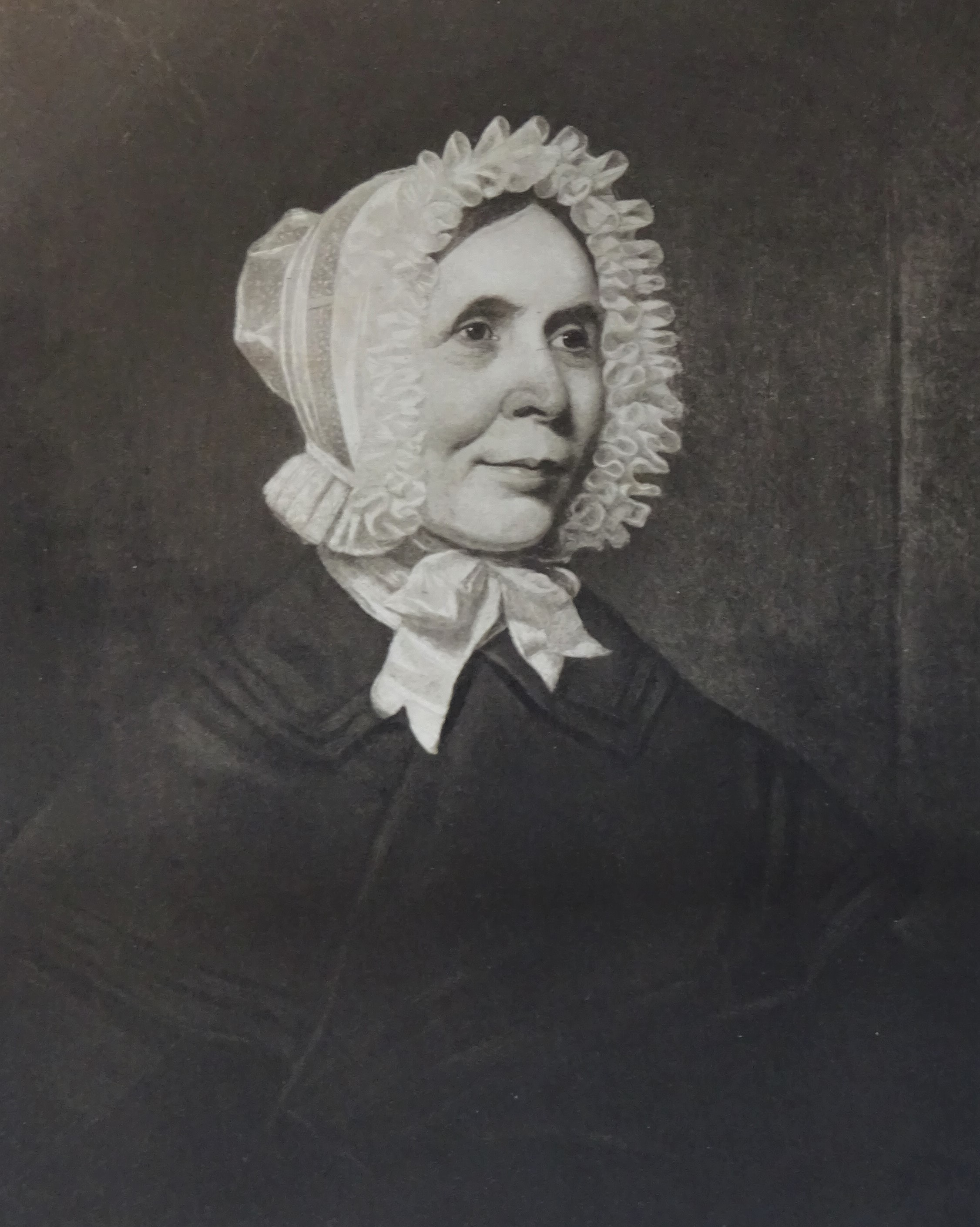
Isabella Burns, Robert's youngest sister

Burns's sister Isabella relates a curious anecdote connected with Alison. Robert was sometimes very late in returning from the Cessnock Banks visiting his belle fille, and one night his father, William Burnes, sat up to let him in and administer a rebuke to his son. William enquired of his son where he had been, and Burns, by way of explanation, told him that he had met the Devil in coming home. This story quite put his father off track and the rebuke was forgotten.

James Hogg, the Ettrick Shepherd, commented that " There is no doubt hanging and marriage go by destiny, else Burns should have had this sensible girl."

It is said that Burns gave Alison a small pocket Bible, a significant gift with a marriage proposal connections, and her father gave it to Mr John Gray in Glasgow from whence it made its way to Miss McWilliam, also of Glasgow, before passing to Mr Campbell Wallace of Galston. The Bible does not contain any writing or marks.

In May 1787 Robert Burns undertook a 'slight pilgrimage to the classic scenes of this country'. His journey took him first to the Borders and then onwards to central Scotland and the Highlands. During this period he attempted to locate the whereabouts of Alison.

1. Carroll, David (2009). Burns Country. Stroud : The History Press. ISBN 978-0-7524-4956-2
2. Cromek, R. H. (1817). Reliques of Robert Burns." 4th Edition. London : Cadell, T & Davies, W.
3. Dougall, Charles S. (1911). The Burns Country. London: A & C Black.
4. Hecht, Hans (1936). Robert Burns. The Man and His Work. London : William Hodge & Co.
5. Hill, John C. Rev. (1961). The Love Songs and Heroines of Robert Burns. London : J. M. Dent.
6. Hogg, Patrick Scott (2008). Robert Burns. The Patriot Bard. Edinburgh: Mainstream Publishing. ISBN 978-1-84596-412-2.
7. Hunter, Douglas & McQueen, Colin Hunter. (2009). Hunter's Illustrated History of the Family, Friends, and Contemporaries of Robert Burns. Published by the authors. ISBN 978-0-9559732-0-8.
8. Mackay, James (2004). Burns. A Biography of Robert Burns. Darvel : Alloway Publishing. ISBN 0-907526-85-3.
9. Muir, John (1896). Burns at Galston and Ecclefechan. Glasgow : John Muir.
10. Paton, Norman R. (1996). The Lass of Cessnock Banks. Burns Chronicle.
