= Carnell Estate =

Building in South Ayrshire, Scotland

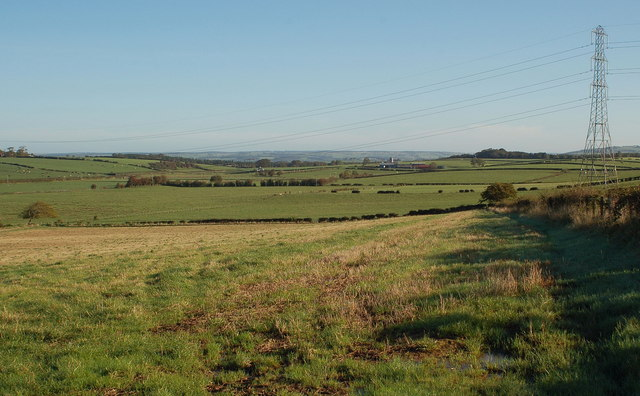
- Carnell Estate in the distance

- Location in South Asyshire Location in Scotland

General information
- Architectural style: Jacobean (tower)

Inventory of Gardens and Designed Landscapes in Scotland
- Official name: Carnell
- Designated: 1 July 1987
- Reference no.: GDL00087
- Location: South Ayrshire, Scotland
- Coordinates: 55°33′32″N 4°25′43″W
- Completed: 1843

Carnell House is a mansion house and estate near the village of Hurlford about 5 miles (8.0 km) south-east of Kilmarnock in South Ayrshire, Scotland, 25 miles (40 km) from Glasgow. Carnell was previously known as Cairn Hill and dates back to 1276.

The house is set within a 2000-acre Estate which is divided into gardens, woodlands and farms. The present form of the house dates back to 1843, although the earlier towers adjoin the newer additions.

The house is home to the Findlay Family whose ancestry includes William Wallace. Ferrier-Hamilton, Hamilton-Findlay.

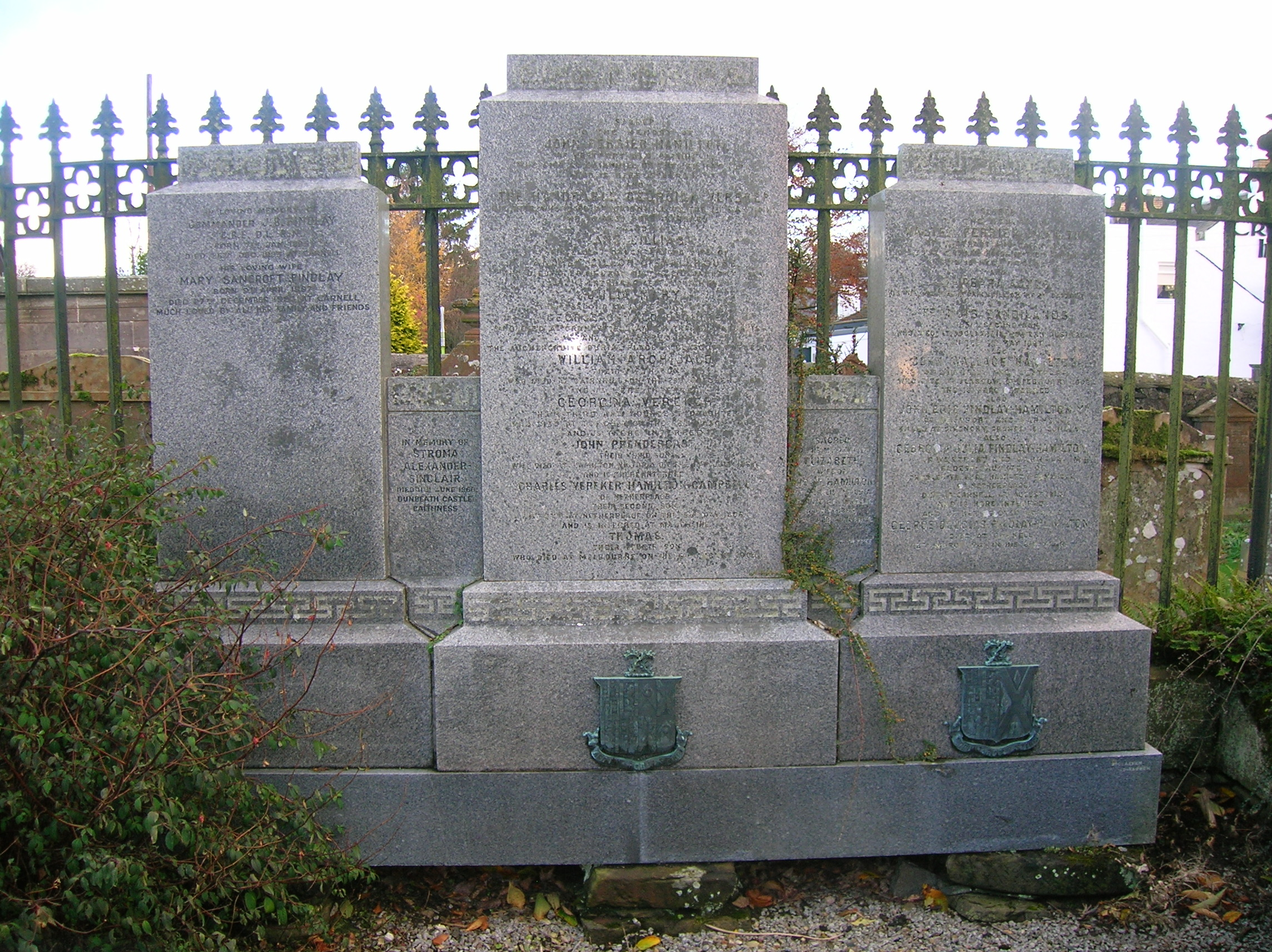
Memorial to the Hamiltons and Findlay-Hamiltons of Carnell

It was built by the Wallace Family and in 1750 was referred to as ‘Cairnhill’ on General Roy's map of 1750. Colonel John Ferrier Hamilton later made considerable improvements to the Estate and in 1843 he commissioned William Burn to build a new house. Georgina Findlay-Hamilton, John's granddaughter, upon inheriting the estate in 1904, made further alterations and was responsible for initially cultivating the 10 acre gardens the estate has today. It then passed to her son-in-law and daughter, Commander and Mrs J B Findlay and then to her son John R Findlay in 1965. Garden House was built in 1973 inside the walled garden. The house is now owned by John's second son Michael who usually resides there with his family.

The keep adjoining the house dates from the 15th century; it rises to three storeys and a garret, which has a parapet corbelled-out. The vaulted basement has a wide kitchen fireplace.

In August 2025, United States Vice President JD Vance stayed at the estate while visiting on a private holiday.
